= Imjin War =

1592–1598 Japanese invasions of Korea

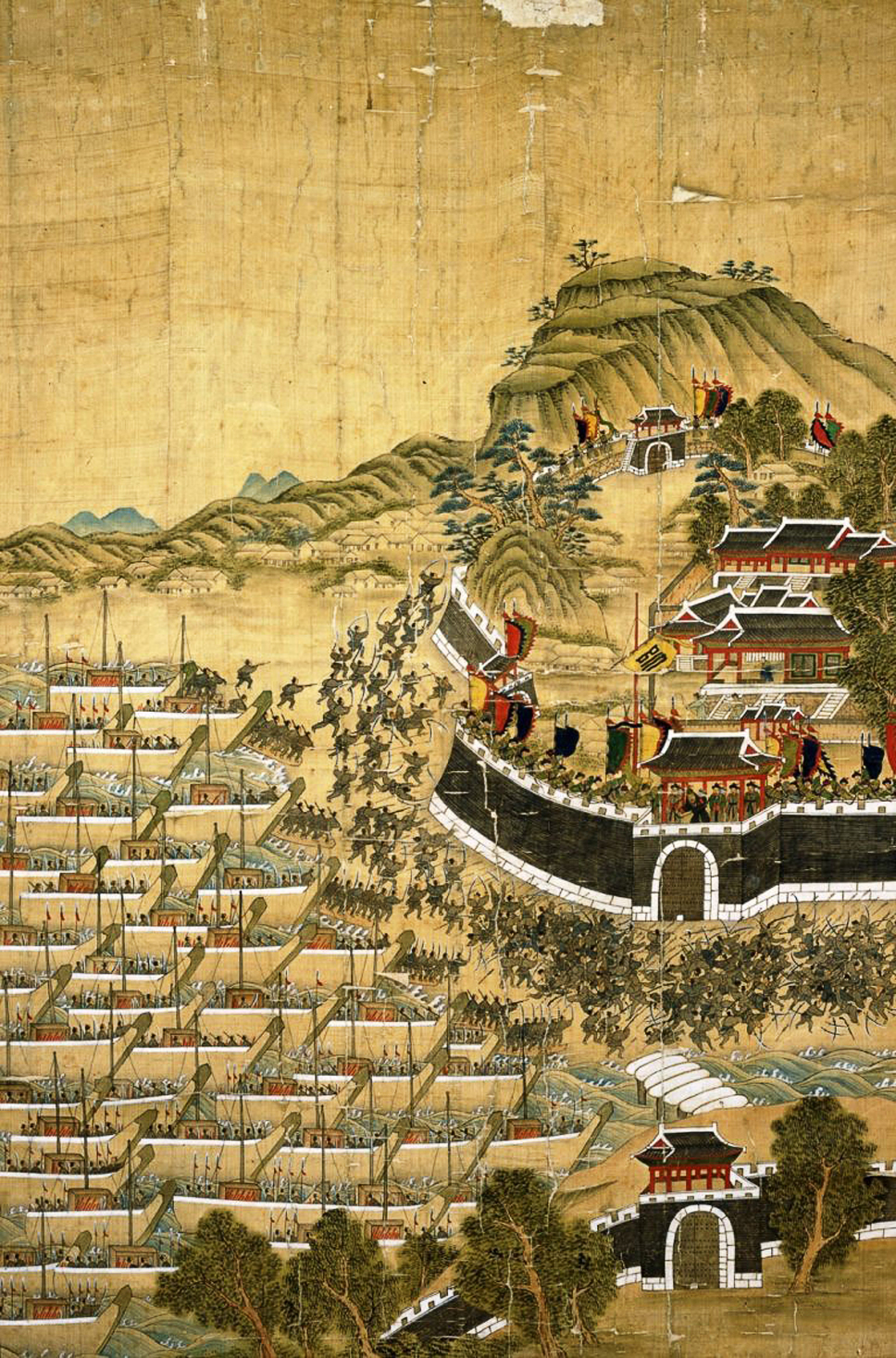
- The Japanese landing at Busan
Date	23 May 1592 – 16 December 1598 (6 years, 6 months, 3 weeks and 2 days) (Gregorian calendar); 1592 (Wanli 20, Bunroku 1), 13th day of the 4th month – 1598 (Wanli 26, Keichō 3), 19th day of the 11th month (lunar calendar)
Location	Korean Peninsula
Result	Joseon and Ming victory
Territorial changes	Status quo ante bellum

Belligerents
Joseon Korea; Ming China	Toyotomi government of Japan

Commanders and leaders
Joseon: King Seonjo; Prince Gwanghae; Yi Sun-sin †; Yi Ŏkki †; Kim Simin †; Kwŏn Yul; Ming: Wanli Emperor; Li Rusong; Song Yingchang; Xing Jie; Chen Lin	Emperor Go-Yōzei; Toyotomi Hideyoshi; Toyotomi Hidetsugu; Ukita Hideie; Nabeshima Naoshige; Katō Kiyomasa; Konishi Yukinaga; Kobayakawa Hideaki

Strength
Joseon: 84,500+–192,000 (including sailors and insurgent fighters); 300 ships; Ming: 1st. (1592–93) 48,000; 2nd. (1597–98) 75,000–80,000 soldiers (including naval reinforcements); Total: 166,700 Ming (Note: Li Guangtao's estimate); 192,000 Joseon	Japan: 1st. (1592); 158,800 (including labourers and sailors); 700 transport ships; 300 warships; 2nd. (1597–98); 141,900; 1,000 ships (some armed with cannons); Total: c. 300,000

Casualties and losses
Joseon: 1,000,000+ civilian and military deaths (including 260,000+ troops killed or wounded); 50,000–60,000 captives; 157 ships; Ming: 30,000+ killed	Japan: 100,000+ soldiers and sailors killed, captured, or missing 450 ships

Imjin War

South Korean name
- Hangul: 임진왜란·정유재란
- Hanja: 壬辰倭亂·丁酉再亂
Transcriptions
- Revised Romanization: Imjin waeran · Jeongyu jaeran

North Korean name
- Chosŏn'gŭl: 임진조국전쟁
- Hancha: 壬辰祖國戰爭
Transcriptions
- McCune–Reischauer: Imjin choguk chŏnjaeng

Japanese name
- Kanji: 文禄の役 (1592–1593) 慶長の役 (1597–1598)
- Hiragana: ぶんろくのえき けいちょうのえき
Transcriptions
- Romanization: Bunroku no Eki; Keichō no Eki

Chinese name
- Traditional Chinese: 萬曆朝鮮之役
- Simplified Chinese: 万历朝鲜之役
Transcriptions
Standard Mandarin
- Hanyu Pinyin: Wànlì Cháoxiǎn zhī yì
Yue: Cantonese
- Yale Romanization: Maahn lihk Jīusīn jī yihk

The Imjin War (Korean: 임진왜란; Hanja: 壬辰倭亂) was a series of two Japanese invasions of Korea: an initial invasion in 1592 also individually called the "Imjin War", a brief truce in 1596 between the conflicts, followed by a second invasion in 1597 called the Chŏngyu War (정유재란; 丁酉再亂). The conflict ended in 1598 with the withdrawal of Japanese forces from the Korean Peninsula after a military stalemate in Korea's southern provinces.

The invasions were launched by Toyotomi Hideyoshi to conquer Korea, and Japan quickly occupied large portions of the country. However, reinforcements from Ming China and disruption of Japanese supply fleets by the Joseon Navy forced the Japanese forces to withdraw from the northern provinces. Thereafter, Joseon civilian militias engaged in guerrilla warfare against the occupying Japanese forces, and supply difficulties hampered both sides. At that point, the conflict ground to a stalemate. The first phase of the conflict ended in 1596.

Japan invaded Korea again in 1597, and gained initial successes on land; similar to the previous campaign, the invading forces were later halted and withdrew to the peninsula's southern coastal regions. Ming and Joseon forces were unable to dislodge the Japanese from these positions. Both sides again became locked in a ten-month-long military stalemate. However, Toyotomi Hideyoshi later died and the Japanese were defeated at the naval Battle of Noryang, effectively ending the war. The invading forces were ordered to withdraw to Japan by the new governing Council of Five Elders soon thereafter. Peace negotiations between the parties followed, and continued for several years, ultimately resulting in the normalization of relations.

== Names ==
In Korean, the first invasion (1592–1593) is called the "Japanese Disturbance of Imjin" (壬辰倭亂), where 1592 is an imjin year in the sexagenary cycle. The second invasion (1597–1598) is called the "Second War of Jeong-yu" (丁酉再亂). Collectively, the invasions are referred to as the "Imjin War".

In Chinese, the wars are referred to as the "Wanli Korean Battle" (萬曆朝鮮之役) or the "Wanli Korean Expedition" (萬曆朝鮮征伐), after the reigning Chinese emperor.

In Japanese, the war is called Bunroku no eki (文禄の役). Bunroku refers to the Japanese era name spanning the period from 1592 to 1596. The second invasion is called Keichō no eki (慶長の役). The war was also called Kara iri (唐入り), "entry into Tang", the dynasty whose name is synonymous with China.

== Background ==
=== Japan and Korea before the war ===
Both Ming China and Joseon Korea emerged during the 14th century after the fall of the Yuan dynasty, embraced Confucian social ideals, and faced similar threats – Jurchen people, who raided along the northern borders, and the wokou, who pillaged coastal villages and trade ships. Both had competing internal political factions, which would influence decisions made before and during the war.

In 1392, General Yi Sŏnggye led a coup to take power in Korea, and he ruled as Taejo of Joseon. The new regime received recognition from, and integration into, the tributary system of China. Within this tributary system, China assumed the role of a "big brother", while Korea maintained the highest position among the tributary states. Through this tributary relationship, Joseon and Ming shared a security alliance.

The system also included countries such as the Ryukyu Kingdom, Lan Xang, Đại Việt, and the Ayutthaya Kingdom, who likewise acted as "younger brother[s]" of China. In 1404, Ashikaga Yoshimitsu, recognized as "King of Japan" by China, had Japan enter the Chinese tributary system. His successor, Ashikaga Yoshimochi, left it in 1408. Membership in the tributary system was a prerequisite for any economic exchange with China; by exiting, Japan relinquished its trade relationship with China. (Note: The economic benefit of the Sinocentric tribute system was profitable trade. The tally trade (kangō bōeki or kanhe maoyi in Chinese) was a system devised and monitored by the Chinese.)

=== Hideyoshi's preparations ===
By the last decade of the 16th century, Toyotomi Hideyoshi had unified Japan. He rallied support in Japan as a man of relatively humble origins who owed his position to his military might. He sought military power to legitimize his rule and decrease his dependence on the imperial family. It is also suggested that Hideyoshi planned an invasion of China to fulfill the dreams of his late lord, Oda Nobunaga, and to keep his newly formed state united against a common enemy, mitigating the possible threat of civil disorder or rebellion posed by the large number of now-idle samurai and soldiers, and by ambitious daimyos who might have sought to usurp him.

As early as 1578, Hideyoshi, then fighting under Oda Nobunaga against Mōri Terumoto for control of the Chūgoku region, informed Terumoto of Nobunaga's plan to invade China. In 1585, Hideyoshi told the Portuguese Jesuit Father Gaspar Coelho of his wish to conquer all of East Asia. Hideyoshi asked Coelho to send a message to King Philip II of Spain, who was also King Philip I of Portugal, asking that he make his navy available to help Japan. However, Philip refused Hideyoshi, preferring not to upset China. Japan's legal tribute missions to China, and hence their right to trade with China, had ceased by the mid-16th century and was replaced by Sino-Japanese smuggler-pirates known as the wokou. Hideyoshi spoke not only of his desire to "slash his way" into Korea to invade China, but also the Philippines, and India.

Japan may have begun the construction of as many as 2,000 ships for an attack as early as 1586. To estimate the strength of the Korean military, Hideyoshi sent an assault force of 26 ships to the southern coast of Korea in 1587. On the diplomatic front, Hideyoshi helped to police trade routes against the wokou. Beginning in March 1591, the Kyushu daimyos and their labor forces constructed Nagoya Castle in modern-day Karatsu, Saga, as the center for the mobilization of the invasion forces.

==== Diplomatic dealings between Japan and Korea ====
In 1587, Hideyoshi sent his first envoy, Yutani Yasuhiro (柚谷康広), to Korea to re-establish diplomatic relations, which had been broken since a wokou raid in 1555. Hideyoshi hoped to use this as a foundation to induce the Korean court to join Japan in a war against China. However, due to Yasuhiro's warrior background and disdain for the Korean officials and their customs, he failed to receive the promise of future ambassadorial missions from Korea. Around May 1589, Hideyoshi's second embassy, consisting of Sō Yoshitoshi, Yanagawa Shigenobu (柳川調信), and Buddhist monk Genso (玄蘇), secured the promise of a Korean embassy to Japan in exchange for a group of Korean rebels which had taken refuge in Japan.

In 1587, Hideyoshi had ordered the adopted father of Yoshitoshi and the daimyo of Tsushima Island, Sō Yoshishige (宗義調), to offer the Joseon Dynasty an ultimatum of submission to Japan and participation in the conquest of China. If they did not accept, they would face the prospect of open war with Japan. However, as Tsushima Island enjoyed a special trading position as the single checkpoint to Korea for all Japanese ships and had permission from Korea to trade with as many as 50 of its own vessels, the Sō family had a vested interest in preventing conflict with Korea, and delayed the talks for nearly two years. Even when Hideyoshi reissued his order, Sō Yoshitoshi instead embarked on a campaign to the Korean court to improve relations between the two countries.

In April 1590, the Korean ambassadors, including Hwang Yun-gil and Kim Sŏngil, left for Kyoto, where they waited for two months while Hideyoshi was finishing his campaign against the Hojo clan. Upon his return, they exchanged ceremonial gifts and delivered the Korean king's letter to Hideyoshi. The Korean ambassadors later asked for Hideyoshi to write a reply to the Korean king, for which they waited 20 days at the port of Sakai. The letter, redrafted at the request of the ambassadors on the ground that it was too discourteous, invited Korea to submit to Japan and join in a war against China.

Upon the ambassadors' return, the Joseon court held serious discussions concerning Japan's invitation. Kim Sŏngil claimed that Hideyoshi's letter was nothing but a bluff. Moreover, the court, aware only that Japan was in turmoil with various clan armies fighting each other, substantially underrated the combined strength of the Japanese. Some, including King Seonjo, argued that Ming should be informed about the dealings with Japan, as failure to do so could make Ming suspect Korea's allegiance, but the court finally concluded to wait further until the appropriate course of action became definite. However, the Korean court mistakenly evaluated Hideyoshi's threats of invasions to be no better than the common wokou Japanese pirate raids. The Korean court handed to Shigenobu and Genso, Hideyoshi's third embassy, the Korean king's letter rebuking Hideyoshi for challenging the Chinese tributary system. Hideyoshi replied with another letter, but since it was not presented by a diplomat in person as expected by custom, the court ignored it.

== Military ==
Korea was a manufacturing hub for cannons and ships during this era. Korean cannons were not adapted for effective use on land, and they used firearms of a less advanced design. On the other hand, Japanese small arms, particularly the tanegashima matchlock arquebuses, proved effective in land combat and sieges. This difference in weaponry contributed to a trend of Japanese dominance on land and Korean dominance at sea during the war.

As Japan had been at war since the mid-15th century, Hideyoshi was able to develop a professional army from a pool of 500,000 battle-hardened soldiers. While Japan's previous turmoil led Koreans to estimate Japan as an unlikely military threat, there was a new sense of unity among the different political factions in Japan, as indicated by the "sword hunt" in 1588 (Note: This refers to a mass confiscation of weaponry from peasants.). Along with the hunt came "The Separation Edict" in 1591, which effectively put an end to all Japanese wokou piracy by prohibiting the daimyos from supporting the pirates within their fiefs. The Koreans believed that Hideyoshi's invasion would be just an extension of the previous pirate raids that had been repelled.

=== Land forces ===
==== Japan ====
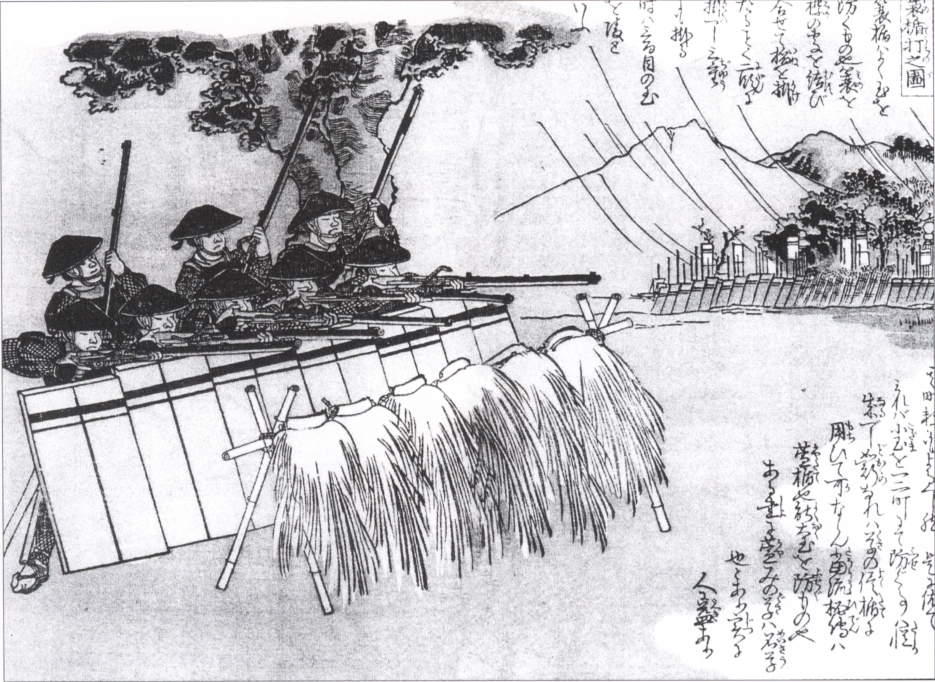
Japanese infantry employing fusillade tactics using tanegashima matchlocks

The samurai were at the core of the Japanese military. The standard samurai weapon by 1592 was the yari, a spear meant to stab, often with a cross-blade that allowed a samurai to pull his opponent from his horse. If a samurai wished to cut his opponent rather than stab, the weapons were the ōdachi, an extremely long sword with a huge handle, or the naginata, a polearm with very sharp curved blade. The most famous of all the samurai weapons was the katana, a sword described by British military historian Stephen Turnbull as "...the finest edged weapon in the history of warfare". Samurai never carried shields, and in lieu of them, the katana was used to deflect blows. By 1592, the armor of the samurai was lamellae made from iron or leather scales tied together which had been modified to include solid plate to help protect the samurai from bullets. Samurai on horseback would often dismount when engaged in action, acting as mounted infantry. While specialized firearms were used on horseback, most cavalrymen preferred the yari, but its use was limited by the increasing use of firearms by the Koreans and Chinese. Samurai engaged in psychological warfare by wearing iron masks into battle with a mustache made of horsehair and a "sinister grin" illustrated.

Most of the Japanese troops in Korea were ashigaru light infantry, usually conscripted peasants armed with either yari, tanegashima or bows called yumi. Unlike the samurai, ashigaru wore cheap suits of iron armour around their chests. Japanese arquebusiers fought in the European style. Men trained to fire their guns in formation to create a volley of fire, then to go down on their knees to reload, while the men behind them fired, and the cycle repeated.

Hideyoshi mobilized his army at Nagoya Castle, newly built for the sole purpose of housing the invasion forces and the reserves. None of the original structures remain, but the castle's ruined foundations survive in the formerly separate town of Chinzei, now part of the city of Karatsu in Saga Prefecture. 158,800 soldiers, laborers, and transport troops spread across nine divisions were prepared to take part in the invasion. Roughly a third of the force consisted of armed fighting units, while the remaining two thirds filled supporting roles. Another two divisions, with 21,500 between them, were held in reserve on Tsushima Island and Iki Island. The Japanese used a total of 320,000 troops throughout the war.

One daimyo whose military service quota has been preserved in a written record is Shimazu Yoshihiro, whose contribution consisted of:

- 600 samurai
- 300 flag bearers
- 1,500 arquebusier ashigaru
- 1,500 archer ashigaru
- 300 spearmen ashigaru
- 6,400 laborers and boatmen

==== Joseon ====
Joseon maintained a standing military structure known as the Five Military Commands (Owi, 오위; 五衛), as well as a regular army (Jeongbyeong, 정병; 正兵) composed of commoners subject to mandatory military service. However, due to a prolonged period of peace, an oversized bureaucracy, and the increasing prevalence of draft evasion through monetary means, it was discovered on the eve of war that the actual number of active soldiers was far lower than the figures recorded in official registers. During the first invasion, Joseon deployed a total of 84,500 regular troops throughout, assisted by 22,000 irregular volunteers. As the war dragged on into the following year, it was confirmed that approximately 170,000 troops had been mobilized for the conflict.

Light infantry protected their chests by wearing ŏmsimgap (엄심갑; 掩心甲), which was made of leather over a cloth robe that served a similar function to the gambeson. Scale armour was also used. However, P'aengbaesu (팽배수; 彭排手), heavy infantry specializing in melee combat, were the mainstay of early Joseon infantry, wearing chain mail or mail and plate armour and armed with a round shield and sword. They would respond to nomadic raids with shields and knives in mountain warfare, and in the plains, they formed shield walls to deter cavalry.

Kapsa (갑사; 甲士) were elite formations of noble origin. Their armor, tujŏng-gap (두정갑; 頭釘甲), was brigandine, popular in Manchuria and Mongolia at the time. Kapsa were required to have a certain amount of wealth to join, as they were expected to self-fund their operations, including by bringing their own horses. To cut costs, Joseon increased its reliance on kapsa, growing the lower ranks, and the number of kapsa increased to 14,000 by 1475. Alongside this, however, the standing army, which had a quota, was neglected, resulting in falsely stated troop figures just before the war.

The Koreans actively deployed their cavalry divisions in action, but terrain was often unsuitable for cavalry. Farmland tended to have many ditches, and were often barren and lacked grass essential for feeding horses. In addition, Japanese use of the arquebus at long range and in concentrated volleys reduced the effectiveness of cavalry. The Korean cavalrymen primarily used bows, and only secondarily swords and lances. Most cavalry action for the Koreans took place in the Battle of Chungju at the beginning of the war, where they were outnumbered and wiped out by Japanese infantry.

The standard Korean sword was the hwando, a curved sword shorter and lighter than its Japanese counterparts. A uniquely Korean weapon was the flail, consisting of a 1.5-metre-long (4.9 ft) red-painted hardwood stick acting as the handle for a chain attached to a shaft with iron nails. Joseon infantrymen often fought as archers, and a Japanese source from 1592 commented that Koreans were superior as soldiers to the Japanese only in archery, because their bows had a range of 450 metres (1,480 ft) against the 300 metres (980 ft) of Japanese archers.

==== Ming ====
The Ming Chinese army was the largest in Asia, with a total of around 845,000 troops; however, in 1592, the Imperial Army was engaged in wars with the Mongols and in crushing a rebellion in the northwest. Over the course of the war, the Ming sent a total of 166,700 troops, though Ming troops in Korea likely never numbered more than 80,000 at any given point. They also sent 17 million liang worth of silver and supplies to Korea.

The core of the Ming army was the infantry, divided into five sections; gunmen, swordsmen, archers with fire arrows, archers with ordinary arrows, and spearmen, backed up by the cavalry and artillery. The basic weapons for the Chinese infantry were the crossbow and the arquebus, while the cavalry were usually mounted archers. Early types of land mines and hand grenades were also used. Chinese infantry wore conical iron helmets and suits of armor made from leather or iron. During siege actions, Chinese deployed rattan shields and iron pavises (large shields).

==== Firearms ====
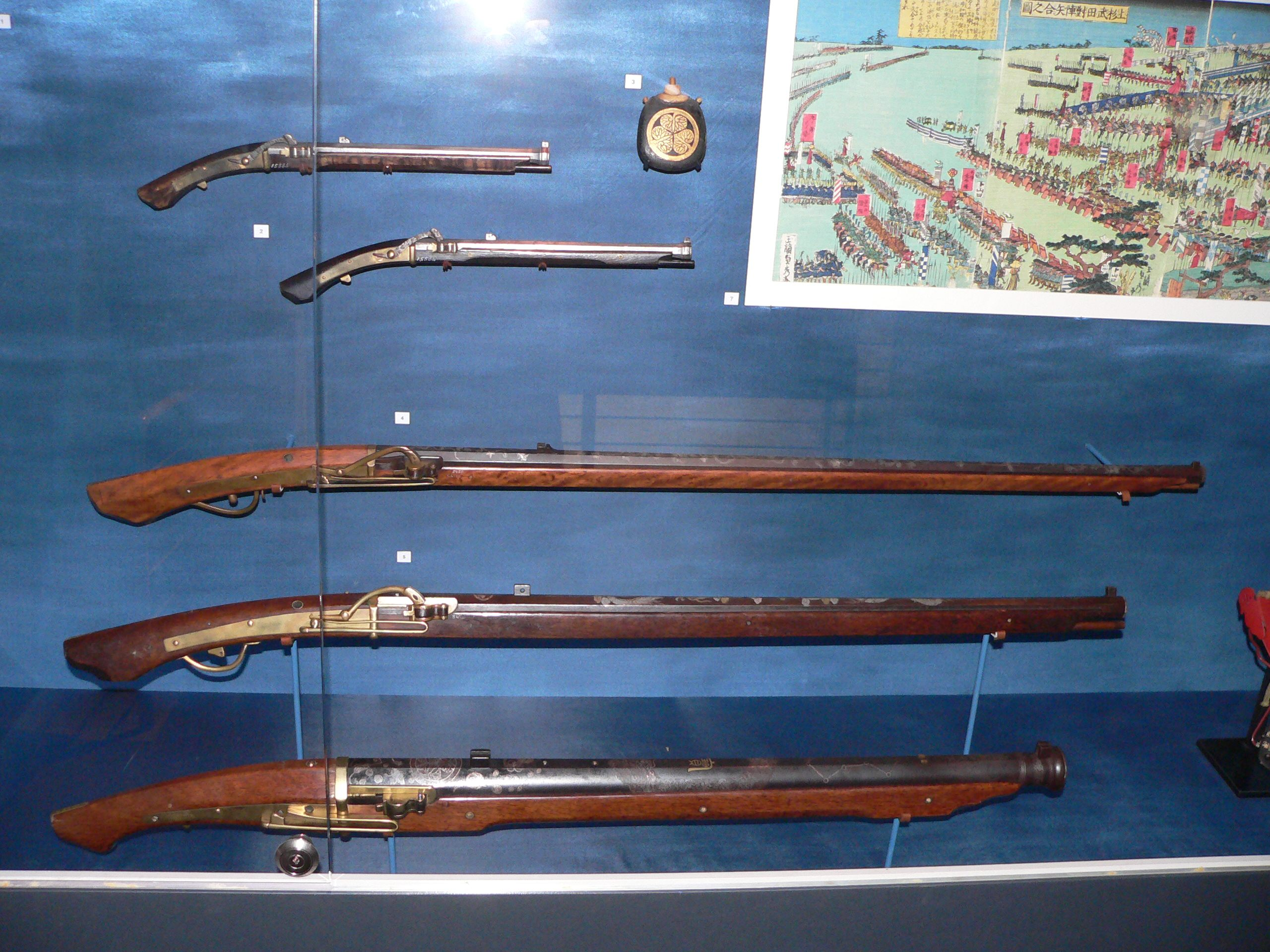
Japanese arquebuses of the Edo period

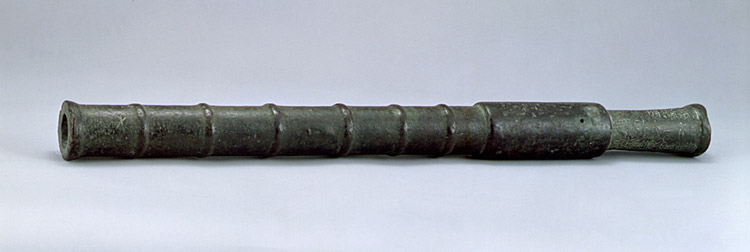
Joseon seungja chongtong hand cannon

Since its introduction by Portuguese traders on the island of Tanegashima in 1543, the arquebus had become widely used in Japan. From the 1560s, tanegashima guns were produced on a scale of at least several thousand a year. By the late sixteenth century, Japan may have had more muskets than any other nation in the world, though bows were still used alongside them. In contrast, though both Korea and China had also been introduced to firearms similar to the Portuguese arquebus, most were older models. Korean soldiers would sometimes use hand cannons with a simple mechanism and either a gunstock or wooden shaft attached.

While tanegashima were superior to Korean bows in terms of penetration and range, they had a lower rate of fire. Accounts from the Annals of Joseon, essays, and diaries of Korean officials express that muskets alone could not ensure victory. Charges of Japanese troops with spears and swords were often more decisive than musketry. The Koreans were poorly trained in close combat, and lacked battlefield experience and discipline. The following words from a Korean military official named Yi Siŏn to the Korean king discusses this weakness:

The King asked him [Yi Siŏn], "You have already told me about the low accuracy of Japanese muskets. Why, then, are Korean armies having great problem with defeating them?"

[Yi Siŏn] then answered, "The Korean soldiers cower before the enemy and flee for their lives even before they have engaged the enemy. As for the commanders, they seldom leave their positions because they fear that they might be executed for deserting. However, there is a limit to executing deserting soldiers since there are so many of them. Truly, the Japanese aren't good musketeers, but they advance so rapidly that they appear right in front of the Koreans in the time Koreans can shoot only two arrows. It is said that Koreans are good archers, but they seldom hit the targets when the enemy is too far away, and are too scared to shoot when the enemy is near because they fear Japanese swords. Archery often becomes useless because Koreans, fearing the Japanese arme blanche, can barely shoot. The Japanese are reputed to be good swordsmen, but it is possible for Koreans to draw swords and hold their ground. However, the Koreans seldom do this and merely run for their lives."

However, another Korean official, Yu Sŏngnyong, claims that the Japanese arquebusiers had undeniable superiority over long distances, which (along with low discipline and combat experience of the Korean army) was the main cause of defeats:

In the 1592 invasion, everything was swept away. Within a fortnight or a month the cities and fortresses were lost, and everything in the eight directions had crumbled. Although it was [partly] due to there having been a century of peace and the people not being familiar with warfare that this happened, it was really because the Japanese had the use of muskets that could reach beyond several hundred paces, that always pierced what they struck, that came like the wind and the hail, and with which bows and arrows could not compare.

Today, the Japanese exclusively use muskets to attack fortifications. They can reach [the target] from several hundred paces away. Our country's bows and arrows cannot reach them. At any flat spot outside the walls, the Japanese will build earthen mounds and "flying towers." They look down into the fortifications and fire their bullets so that the people inside the fortifications cannot conceal themselves. In the end the fortifications are taken. One cannot blame [the defenders] for their situation.

The Japanese also saw arquebuses as crucial. A Japanese commander wrote home in 1592:

Please arrange to send us guns and ammunition. There is absolutely no use for spears. It is vital that you arrange somehow to obtain a number of guns. Furthermore, you should certainly see to it that those person departing [for Korea] understand this situation. The arrangements for guns should receive your closest attention.

The Japanese commander Asano Yoshinaga wrote home to his father:

When the troops come [to Korea] from the province of Kai, have them bring as many guns as possible, for no other equipment is needed. Give strict orders that all men, even the samurai, carry guns.

==== Artillery ====
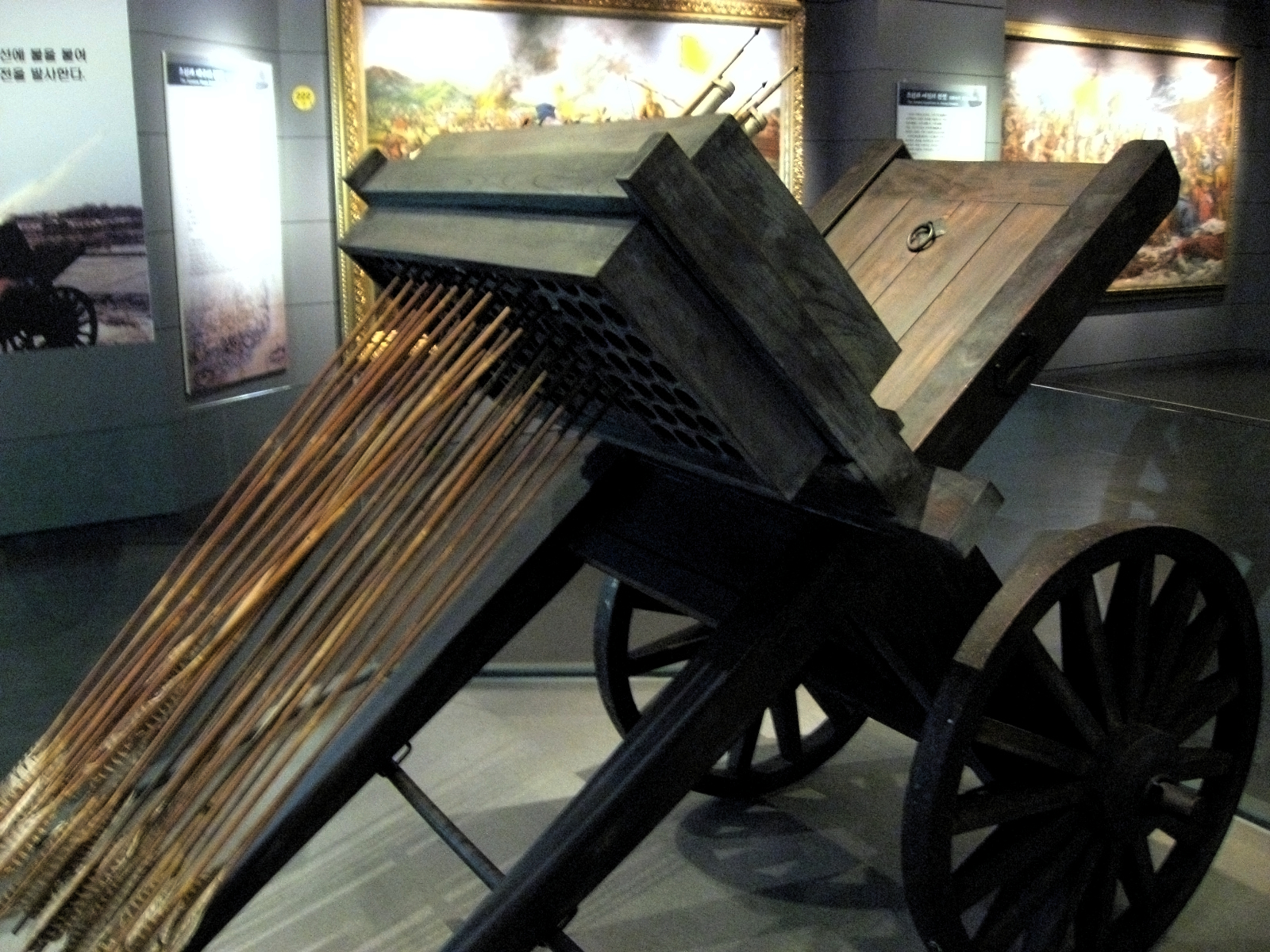
A hwacha on display

Korean mainly used artillery in siege action and for defending castles. In a few instances, some irregular Korean units with government-supplied weapons fired explosive shells from mortars. The Koreans also made use of hwacha, two-wheeled carts carrying hole-filled boards fitted to carry either 100 steel-tipped rockets or 200 singijeon (rocket arrows) to be fired all at once. They were especially effective against dense formations of troops.

According to Turnbull, Chinese field artillery and siege cannon were the finest in the region. Chinese artillery was made from cast iron, and were divided into several types, the most important being the "great general cannon", large breech-loading cannon atop two-wheeled carts, shooting iron balls weighing about 10 kilograms, and the folang zhi (佛朗支), which was also breech-loading. The Chinese also employed the hu dun pao bombard, which was noted for being decisive in retaking Pyongyang.

The Japanese employed field artillery only where strategically advantageous in both siege and field warfare situations, often using captured pieces where available.

=== Naval forces ===
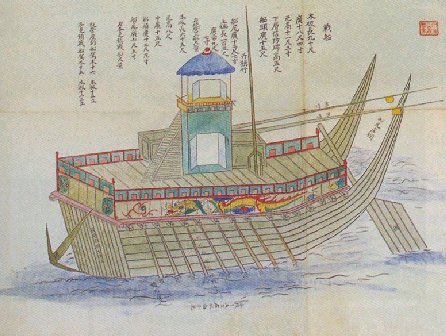
An old painting of a Korean panokseon

Compared to Japanese ships, Korean ones were faster, more maneuverable, more heavily built, with thick wooden hulls impervious to musket fire, and were equipped with large cannons. The standard Korean ship was the panokseon, similar in appearance to standard Japanese warships, but larger and with heavy cannons; most Japanese ships had no cannons at all at the start of the war. The famous heavily armored and armed "turtle ships" were a minority of the Korean navy's ships. Korean and Japanese accounts both talk much of the "turtle ships", but no such ship has survived, and historians still debate about what turtle ships looked like, though most now agree that they were, in fact, turtle-shaped.

The centralized structure of the Korean navy was also a factor in its successes. With Hideyoshi unable to directly command the Japanese naval effort, each daimyo was left to himself to work out how best to face the Korean threat, according to his own interests. Personal motivations greatly hindered the Japanese in facing the unified fleet of Yi Sun-sin, eventually made supreme commander of the whole Korean navy, a role the Japanese had no counterpart to.

The Japanese, who almost totally lacked naval artillery as they relied on anti-personnel naval techniques such as naval boarding and small arms fire, could be outranged and bombarded with impunity by Korean ships outside the range of Japanese muskets, arrows, and catapults. When the Japanese attempted to rerofit cannons to their ships, their lightweight ship design precluded the use of more than a few per vessel, and they usually lacked the range or firepower of their Korean counterparts. In order to bolster their fleet, the Japanese considered employing two Portuguese galleons in the invasion.

=== Command ===
==== Japan ====
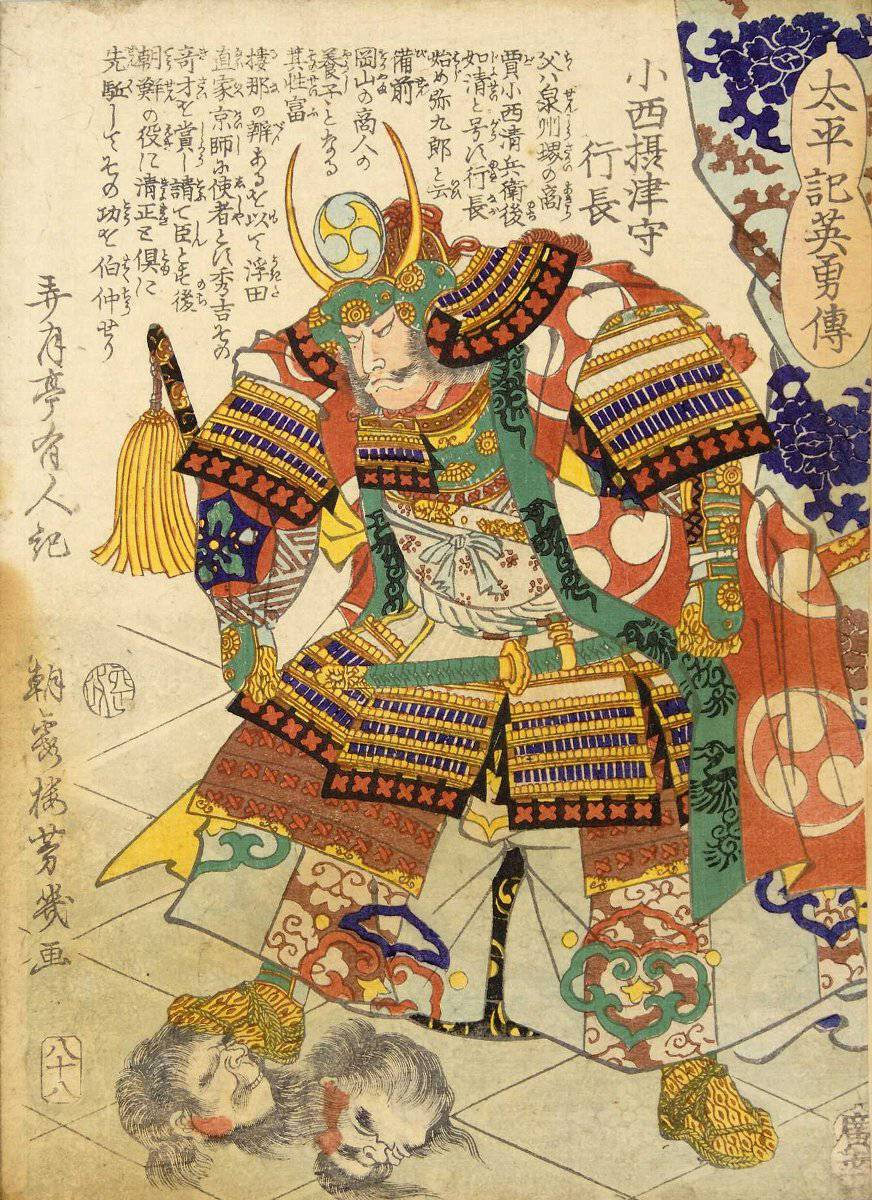
Ukiyo-e art of Konishi Yukinaga

The Japanese army had no central command system with a hierarchy of government-appointed officers; rather, it consisted of armies raised, maintained, and led by daimyos, feudal lords subordinate to the shogun who owned most of the land in Japan. This decentralized structure allowed armies to operate fully independently of one another. Hideyoshi himself never left Japan, remaining near Kyoto; however, the idea of conquering China was his obsession, and throughout the war, he refused to accept defeat, treating the war as simply a matter of willpower. Turnbull writes: "In a tactical sense, therefore, Hideyoshi cannot be considered as one of the commanders, but, as his will drove the whole project along until he died, his political influence cannot be underestimated".

The commander of the Japanese First Division and overall commander of the invasion force was Konishi Yukinaga, daimyo of Uto in Higo Province of Kyushu. He was chosen as commander of the invasion force more because of his diplomatic skills than military skills, as Toyotomi Hideyoshi did not expect the Koreans to resist. Konishi had converted to Catholicism in 1583, and was known to the Spanish and Portuguese as Dom Agostinho. Katō Kiyomasa, who led the Second Division into Korea, was known in Japan as Toranosuke ("the young tiger") and to the Koreans as the "devil general", on account of his ferocity. Katō was a devoted follower of Nichiren Buddhism, a type of Buddhism closely associated with militarism and ultra-nationalism in Japan, and his relations with the Catholic Konishi were extremely unfriendly, to the extent that the two men almost never met during the campaign in Korea. Katō's battle standard was a white pennant which carried a message alleged to have been written by Nichiren himself reading Namu Myōhō Renge Kyō ("Hail to the Lotus of the Divine Law"). Wakisaka Yasuharu was one of Hideyoshi's leading naval commanders who had been named daimyo of the island of Awaji in the Seto Inland Sea in 1585, where he learned much about seafaring as the island is located close to whirlpools which are notoriously dangerous for sailors.

==== Joseon ====
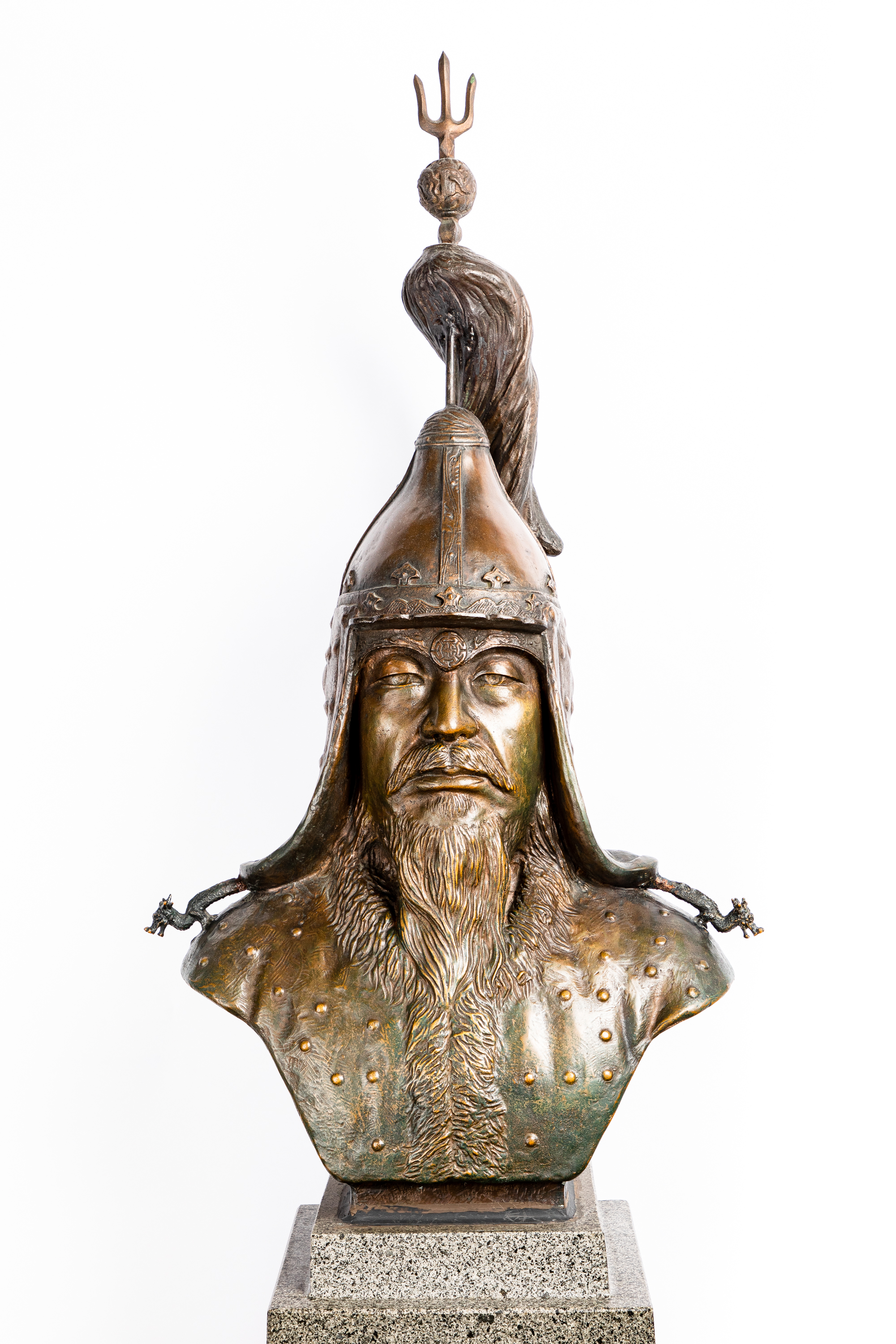
Modern bust depicting Yi Sun-sin

Officers in the Joseon Army and Navy also came exclusively from the aristocracy, but unlike the militarist Japanese aristocrats trained from their youth, for the Joseon aristocracy, scholarship was valued and war was disparaged as something unworthy of a Confucian gentleman-scholar. The quality of Korean generalship was quite variable; some Korean officers were able and others were men who had not devoted much time to the study of war. One standout was admiral Yi Sun-sin. He began the war as a provincial naval commander associated with Jeolla Province, (Note: Korean provinces as this time had two principal naval commanders assigned to each province, known as the "left" and "right" naval commanders. Yi Sun-sin was the "left" naval commander of Jeolla Province at this time.) and later became the commander of the Korean navy. He was described by Turnbull as "Korea's greatest hero" and "one of the outstanding naval commanders in the entire history of the world".

==== Ming ====
One of the Chinese commanders was Li Rusong, a man who has traditionally been disparaged in Japanese accounts; by Turnbull's estimate, he was "one of Ming China's most accomplished generals". Chen Lin, a native of Guangdong, was a major Chinese naval commander who proved pivotal in defeating Japan and defending Korea. After helping win the war, Chen was celebrated as a hero in Korea and China. Chen subsequently became the founder of the Gwangdong Jin clan of Korea, and today, his descendants are spread across China and Korea. Chen was given the nickname Guangdong Master for his naval and military accomplishments.

== Imjin War: Japanese first invasion (1592–1593) ==
First wave of the Japanese invasion
1st div.	Konishi Yukinaga	7,000	18,700
1st div.	Sō Yoshitoshi	5,000	18,700
1st div.	Matsura Shigenobu	3,000	18,700
1st div.	Arima Harunobu	2,000	18,700
1st div.	Ōmura Yoshiaki	1,000	18,700
1st div.	Gotō Sumiharu	700	18,700
2nd div.	Katō Kiyomasa	10,000	22,800
2nd div.	Nabeshima Naoshige	12,000	22,800
2nd div.	Sagara Yorifusa	800	22,800
3rd div.	Kuroda Nagamasa	5,000	11,000
3rd div.	Ōtomo Yoshimune	6,000	11,000
4th div.	Shimazu Yoshihiro	10,000	14,000
4th div.	Mōri Yoshimasa	2,000	14,000
4th div.	Takahashi Mototane, Akizuki Tanenaga, Itō Suketaka, Shimazu Tadatoyo	2,000	14,000
5th div.	Fukushima Masanori	4,800	25,100
5th div.	Toda Katsushige Ikoma Kazumasa	3,900	25,100
5th div.	Chōsokabe Motochika	3,000	25,100
5th div.	Ikoma Chikamasa	5,500	25,100
5th div.	Kurushima Michifusa	700	25,100
5th div.	Hachisuka Iemasa	7,200	25,100
6th div.	Kobayakawa Takakage	10,000	15,700
6th div.	Kobayakawa Hidekane, Tachibana Muneshige, Tachibana Naotsugu, Tsukushi Hirokado, Ankokuji Ekei	5,700	15,700
7th div.	Mōri Terumoto	30,000	30,000
Subtotal		162,300	
Reservers (8th div.)	Ukita Hideie (Tsushima Island)	10,000	21,500
(9th div.)	Toyotomi Hidekatsu and Hosokawa Tadaoki (Iki Island)	11,500	21,500
Subtotal		183,800	
Stationed force at Nagoya	Tokugawa Ieyasu, Uesugi Kagekatsu, Gamō Ujisato, Satake Yoshinobu and others	75,000	75,000
Subtotal		258,800	
Naval force exclusion	Kuki Yoshitaka, Wakizaka Yasuharu, Katō Yoshiaki, Ōtani Yoshitsugu	−9,000	
Total (rounded)		250,000	

=== Initial attacks ===
==== Landing of the First Division ====
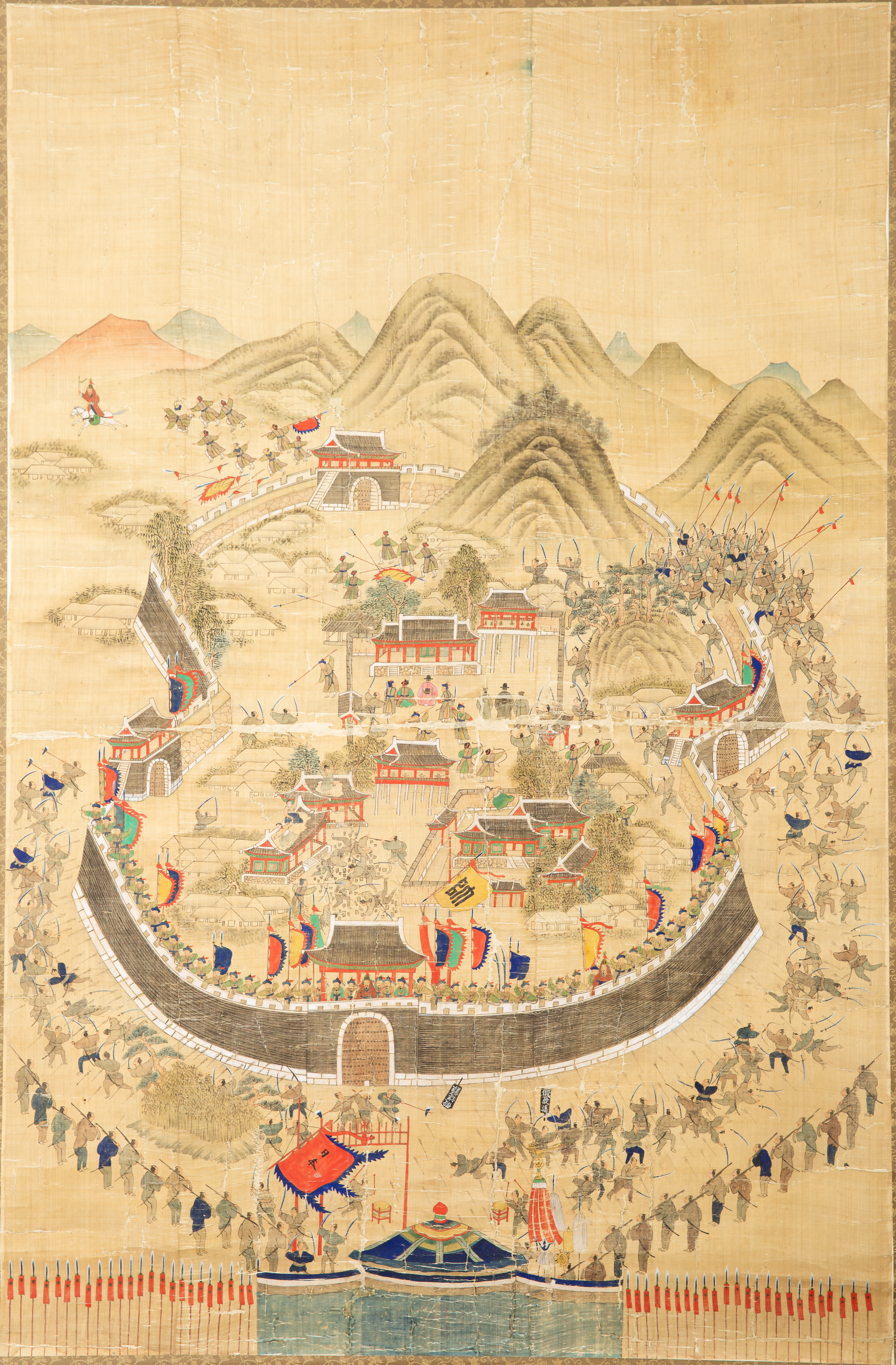
"Dongnaebu Sunjeoldo", a Korean painting from 1760 depicting the Battle of Dongnae

On 23 May 1592, 7,000 Japanese soldiers of the First Division, led by Konishi Yukinaga, departed from Tsushima Island in the morning, arriving outside the Korean port city of Busan in the evening. Korean naval intelligence had detected the Japanese fleet, but Wŏn Kyun, the Right Naval Commander of Gyeongsang Province, misidentified the fleet as trading vessels on a mission. A later report of the arrival of an additional 100 Japanese vessels raised his suspicions, but he did nothing about it. Sō Yoshitoshi landed alone on the Busan shore to ask the Koreans for safe passage to China. The Koreans refused, and Sō Yoshitoshi laid siege to the city. Konishi Yukinaga attacked the nearby fort of Dadaejin the next morning. Japanese accounts claim that the battles resulted in the annihilation of Korean forces, while a Korean account claims that the Japanese themselves took significant losses before sacking the city of Busan. Chŏng Pal, the Korean commander at Busan, was killed, and with his death, Korean morale collapsed. In the meantime, Konishi took the fort of Dadaejin. Konishi ordered that no prisoners be taken, and the entire garrison was massacred. Konishi and the First Division then turned north, marching to take Hanseong.

=== First Division attack ===
On the morning of 25 May 1592, the Japanese First Division arrived at the Dongnae Fortress. Konishi sent a message to Song Sang-hyeon, the commander of the fortress, explaining to him that his objective was the conquest of China and if the Koreans would just submit, their lives would be spared. Song replied, "It is easy for me to die, but difficult to let you pass", which led Konishi to order that no prisoners be taken to punish Song for his defiance. The resulting siege of Dongnae lasted twelve hours, killed 3,000, and resulted in a Japanese victory. The Japanese took no prisoners and killed everyone at Dongnae, including civilians and even cats and dogs. Konishi's sought to terrify the Koreans, but he instead stimulated Korean resistance, as ordinary Koreans were enraged.

After taking Dongnae, Konishi took the castle of Miryang, which he followed up by taking Daegu, which surrendered without opposition. After crossing the Nakdong River, Konishi learned that the Koreans were concentrating their troops at Sangju. In the meantime, Korean envoys had been sent to the China to ask the Wanli Emperor to protect his tributaries in Korea by sending an army to drive out the Japanese. The Chinese assured the Koreans that an army would be sent, but they were engaged in a major war in Ningxia, and the Koreans would have to wait for the arrival of their assistance.

==== Occupation of Gyeongsang Province ====
Katō Kiyomasa's Second Division landed in Busan on 27 May, and Kuroda Nagamasa's Third Division, west of Nakdong River, on 28 May. The Second Division took the abandoned city of Tongdo on 28 May, and captured Gyeongju on 30 May. The Third Division captured nearby Kim hae soon after landing. By 3 June, the Third Division also captured Unsan, Changnyeong, Hyeonpung, and Seongju. Meanwhile, Konishi Yukinaga's First Division passed the previously captured Yangsan mountain fortress, and captured Miryang castle on the afternoon of 26 May. The First Division secured the Cheongdo fortress in the next few days, and destroyed the city of Daegu. By 3 June, the First Division crossed the Nakdong River, and stopped at Seonsan mountain.

==== Battle of Sangju ====
Upon receiving news of the Japanese attacks, Joseon appointed Yi Il as the mobile border commander. Yi went to Mungyeong, near the strategically important Choryong Pass, to gather troops, but he had to travel further south to meet the troops assembled at the city of Daegu. There, General Yi moved all troops back to Sangju, except for the survivors of the Siege of Dongnae, who were to be stationed as a rearguard at the Choryong Pass. On 4 June, General Yi deployed a force of fewer than 1,000 men on two small hills to face the approaching First Division. Assuming that the sight of rising smoke was from a nearby Japanese force, General Yi sent an officer to scout it. However, the officer was ambushed by Japanese soldiers from below the bridge, and beheaded. The Korean troops, watching him fall, were greatly demoralized. Soon the Japanese began the Battle of Sangju. The Japanese forces, were divided into three and attacked the Korean lines from the front and the two flanks. The battle ended with General Yi Il's retreat and 700 Korean casualties.

==== Battle of Chungju ====
General Yi Il planned to use Joryeong pass, the only path through the western end of the Sobaek mountain range, to check the Japanese advance. However, another commander, Sin Rip, had arrived with a cavalry division and moved 100,000 combined troops to the Chungju fortress above Joryeong pass. Rather than face a siege, Sin Rip decided to fight in the open fields of Tangeumdae, which he felt ideal for the deployment of his cavalry unit. Since the cavalry consisted mostly of new recruits, however, Sin Rip was concerned that his troops may easily be tempted to flee the battle. As a result, he felt the need to trap his forces in the triangular area formed by the convergence of the Tancheon and Han rivers in the shape of a "Y". This field, however, was dotted with flooded rice paddies and was generally not suitable for cavalry action.

On 5 June 1592, approximately 18,000 men under the First Division and led by Konishi Yukinaga left Sangju and reached an abandoned fortress at Mungyeong by nightfall. The next day, this force arrived at Tangeumdae in the early afternoon, where they faced the Korean cavalry at the Battle of Chungju. Konishi divided his forces into three and attacked with arquebuses from both flanks and the front. The Korean arrows fell short of the Japanese troops, and General Sin's two charges failed to break the Japanese lines. General Sin then killed himself in the river, and the Koreans that tried to escape by the river either drowned or were decapitated by the pursuing Japanese.

=== Capture of Hanseong ===
The Second Division, led by Katō Kiyomasa, arrived at Chungju, with the Third Division camped not far behind. There, Katō expressed his anger against Konishi Yukinaga for not waiting at Busan as planned, and attempting to take all of the glory; Nabeshima Naoshige proposed a compromise of dividing the Japanese troops into two groups to follow different routes to Hanseong, and allowing Katō Kiyomasa to choose the route that the Second Division would take to reach Hanseong. The division of the Japanese forces was mainly due to the rivalry between Katō and Konishi, but there was a certain "strategic merit" in dividing their forces in that Katō's advance would protect the Japanese from any attempt by the Jurchen leader Nurhaci to attack their flank. However, the division of the Japanese forces also meant that Konishi would have to take on the Chinese alone when their army arrived.

The two divisions raced to capture Hanseong from 8 June; Katō took the shorter route across the Han River while Konishi went further upstream for calmer waters. Konishi arrived at Hanseong first, on 10 June, while the Second Division was halted at the river with no boats with which to cross. The First Division found the castle undefended with its gates locked, as King Seonjo had fled the day before. The Japanese broke into a floodgate, located in the castle wall, and opened the city's gate from within. Katō's Second Division arrived at the capital the next day after taking the same route as the First Division, and the Third and Fourth Divisions arrived the day after. Meanwhile, the Fifth, Sixth, Seventh, and Eighth Divisions had landed on Busan, with the Ninth Division kept in reserve on the island of Iki.

Parts of Hanseong had already been looted and torched, including bureaus holding slave records and weapons, and they were already abandoned. Korean general Kim Myŏngwŏn, in charge of the defenses along the Han River, had retreated. The king's subjects stole the animals in the royal stables and fled before him, leaving their king to rely on farm animals. In every village, the king's party was met by inhabitants, lined up by the road, grieving that their king was abandoning them, and neglecting their duty of paying homage. Parts of the southern shore of the Imjin River were burnt to deprive the Japanese troops of materials with which to make their crossing, and General Kim Myŏngwŏn deployed 12,000 troops along the river.

=== Japanese campaigns in the north ===
Map of invasions

==== Crossing of the Imjin River ====
While the First Division rested in Hanseong, the Second Division headed north and were delayed for two weeks by the Imjin River. The Japanese sent a message to the Koreans on the other bank requesting they open the way to China, but the Koreans rejected this. Afterwards, the Japanese commanders withdrew their main forces to the safety of the Paju fortress. The Koreans saw this as a retreat, and 13,000 Korean troops launched an attack at dawn against the remaining Japanese troops on the shore of the Imjin River. The Japanese counterattacked against the isolated Korean troops, and acquired their boats. The Korean troops retreated to the Kaesong fortress.

==== Distribution of Japanese forces in 1592 ====
The Kaesong castle was sacked shortly after General Kim Myŏngwŏn retreated to Pyongyang. Thereafter, the Japanese divided their objectives: the First Division would pursue the Korean king in Pyongan Province; the Second Division would attack Hamgyong Province; the Sixth Division would attack Jeolla Province; the Fourth Division would secure Gangwon Province; and, the Third, Fifth, Seventh, and Eighth Divisions would stabilize the following provinces respectively: Hwanghae Province, Chungcheong Province, Gyeongsang Province, and Gyeonggi Province.

==== Capture of Pyongyang ====
The First Division under Konishi Yukinaga proceeded northward, and sacked Pyongsan, Sŏhŭng, Pungsan, Hwangju, and Chunghwa along the way. At Chunghwa, the Third Division under Kuroda Nagamasa joined the First, and continued to the city of Pyongyang located behind the Taedong River. A total of 10,000 Korean troops guarded the city against the 30,000 advancing Japanese. They were led by various commanders, including the Generals Yi Il and Kim Myŏngwŏn, and their defense preparations had assured that no boats were available for Japanese use.

At night, the Koreans silently crossed the river and launched a successful surprise attack against the Japanese camp. However, this alerted the rest of the Japanese army, which attacked the rear of the Korean positions and destroyed the remaining reinforcements crossing the river. The remainder of the Korean troops then retreated to Pyongyang, and the Japanese troops gave up their pursuit of the Koreans to observe the manner in which the Koreans had crossed the river.

The next day, the Japanese began sending troops to the other shore over the shallow points in the river, in a systematic manner, and at this sight the Koreans abandoned the city overnight. On 20 July 1592, the First and Third Divisions entered the deserted city of Pyongyang. In the city, they managed to capture 100,000 tons of military supplies and grain.

==== Campaigns in Gangwon Province ====
The Fourth Division, under Mōri Yoshinari, set out from Hanseong in July, and captured a series of fortresses along the eastern coast from Anbyon to Samcheok. The division then turned inward to capture Jeongseon, Yeongwol, and Pyeongchang, and settled down at Wonju. There, Mōri Yoshinari established a civil administration, systematized social ranks according to the Japanese model, and conducted land surveys. Shimazu Yoshihiro, one of the generals in the Fourth Division, arrived in Gangwon Province late, due to the Umekita uprising, and finished the campaign by securing Chuncheon.

==== Campaigns in Hamgyong Province and Manchuria ====
Katō Kiyomasa, leading the Second Division of more than 20,000 men, crossed the peninsula to Anbyon County with a ten-day march, and swept north along the eastern coast. Among the castles captured was Hamhung, the provincial capital of Hamgyong Province. There, a part of the Second Division was assigned to defense and civil administration.

The rest of the division continued north, and fought a battle on 23 August against the Hamgyong armies under the command of Yi Yŏng at Songjin. A Korean cavalry division took advantage of the open field at Songjin, and pushed the Japanese forces into a grain storehouse. There, the Japanese barricaded themselves with bales of rice and repelled a Korean charge. Katō Kiyomasa arrived and ambushed the Koreans that night. The Second Division surrounded the Korean forces, with the exception of an opening leading to a swamp. Those that fled were trapped and slaughtered in the swamp.

The Koreans who fled alerted the other garrisons, allowing the Japanese troops to capture Kilju County, Myongchon County, and Kyongsong County. The Second Division then turned inland through Puryong County toward Hoeryong, where two Korean princes had taken refuge. On 30 August 1592, the Second Division entered Hoeryong, where Katō Kiyomasa received the Korean princes and the provincial governor, Yu Yŏngnip (유영립; 柳永立), these having already been captured by the local inhabitants. Shortly afterward, a Korean warrior band handed over the head of an anonymous Korean general, plus General Han Kŭkham, tied up in ropes.

Katō Kiyomasa then attacked a nearby Jurchen castle across the Tumen River in Manchuria to test his troops against the "barbarians". Kato's army of 8,000 was joined by 3,000 Koreans at Hamgyong Province, because the Jurchens periodically raided across the border. Soon the combined force sacked the castle, and camped near the border; after the Koreans left for home, the Japanese troops suffered a retaliatory assault from the Jurchens. Katō Kiyomasa retreated to avoid heavy losses. Because of this invasion, Jurchen leader Nurhaci offered military assistance to Joseon and Ming in the war. However, the offer was refused by both countries, with Ming seeing Nurhaci as a serious and rising threat and Yu Sŏngnyong urging King Seonjo not to accept.

The Second Division continued east, capturing the fortresses of Chongsŏng County, Onsong, Kyongwon, and Kyonghung Counties, and finally arrived at Sosupo on the estuary of the Tumen River. There the Japanese continued their previous efforts to bureaucratize and administer the province, and allowed several garrisons to be handled by the Koreans themselves.

Subsequently, however, with the support of the people of Hamgyong Province, 3500 Korean soldiers recaptured Kyongsong, Hoeryong and Puryong, and executed those who collaborated with the Japanese, greatly spreading the resistance movement throughout Hamgyong Province. On 30 October 1592, a Japanese army of 1000 men returning from looting Joseon villages was attacked by 500 Joseon cavalry at Seokseongryeong and forced to retreat, becoming isolated in the extreme cold on Mount Jangdeok. In response, the Korean soldiers set fire to the mountain the next day at sunrise, annihilating the Japanese army.

Even in this situation, Katō was hesitant to send troops or retreat. Eventually, as the situation worsened and the Japanese suffered heavy losses at Jinju Castle and were forced to concentrate their forces to the south, he ordered his troops to guard Kilju Castle and wait for relief. Eventually, the remaining Japanese forces in Hamgyong Province retreated to Kilju Castle, and the Koreans laid siege to the castle for three months to prevent them from gathering firewood.

In January, Kiyomasa Kato lead an army to retake Hamgyeongdo. On 21 January, the Korean armies attacked the Japanese at Dancheon and inflicted heavy losses on the Japanese vanguard there. However, they were defeated three time by the main Japanese army and were forced to break the siege of Kilju Castle and withdraw. This allowed the trapped Japanese to escape. Regardless though, Katō Kiyomasa was forced to abandon Hamgyong Province due to cold and supply problems, and withdrew to Hanyang on 29 February.

=== Naval campaigns of 1592 ===
Map of Admiral Yi Sun-sin's naval campaigns – 1592

After securing Pyongyang, the Japanese planned to cross the Yalu River into Jurchen territory and use the waters west of the Korean peninsula to supply the invasion. However, Yi Sun-sin, who, a provincial-level naval commander, destroyed the Japanese ships transporting troops and supplies. Japan, lacking enough arms and troops to carry on the invasion of China, changed the objective of the war to the occupation of Korea.

When the Japanese landed at Busan, Pak Hong, another provincial-level naval commander, destroyed his entire fleet, his base of operations, and all armaments and provisions, then fled. Provincial-level naval commander Wŏn Kyun, acted similarly, and fled to Konyang with only four ships. As a result, there was no Korean naval activity around Gyeongsang Province. The surviving two fleets were active only on the western side of Korea. Wŏn Kyun later sent a message to Yi Sun-sin that he had fled to Konyang after being overwhelmed by the Japanese in a fight. However, Yi Sun-sin's battles steadily affected the war and put significant strain on the sea lanes along the western Korean Peninsula that supported the Japanese advance.

The Korean navy relied on a network of local fishermen and scouting boats to receive intelligence of the enemy movements. On the dawn of 21 July 1592, Yi Sun-sin and Yi Ŏkki set sail with 24 panokseon, 15 small warships, and 46 fishing boats, and arrived at Gyeongsang Province. The Japanese had been sailing up and down the Korean coast, looting and burning seaside villages, and did not expect opposition from the Korean navy.

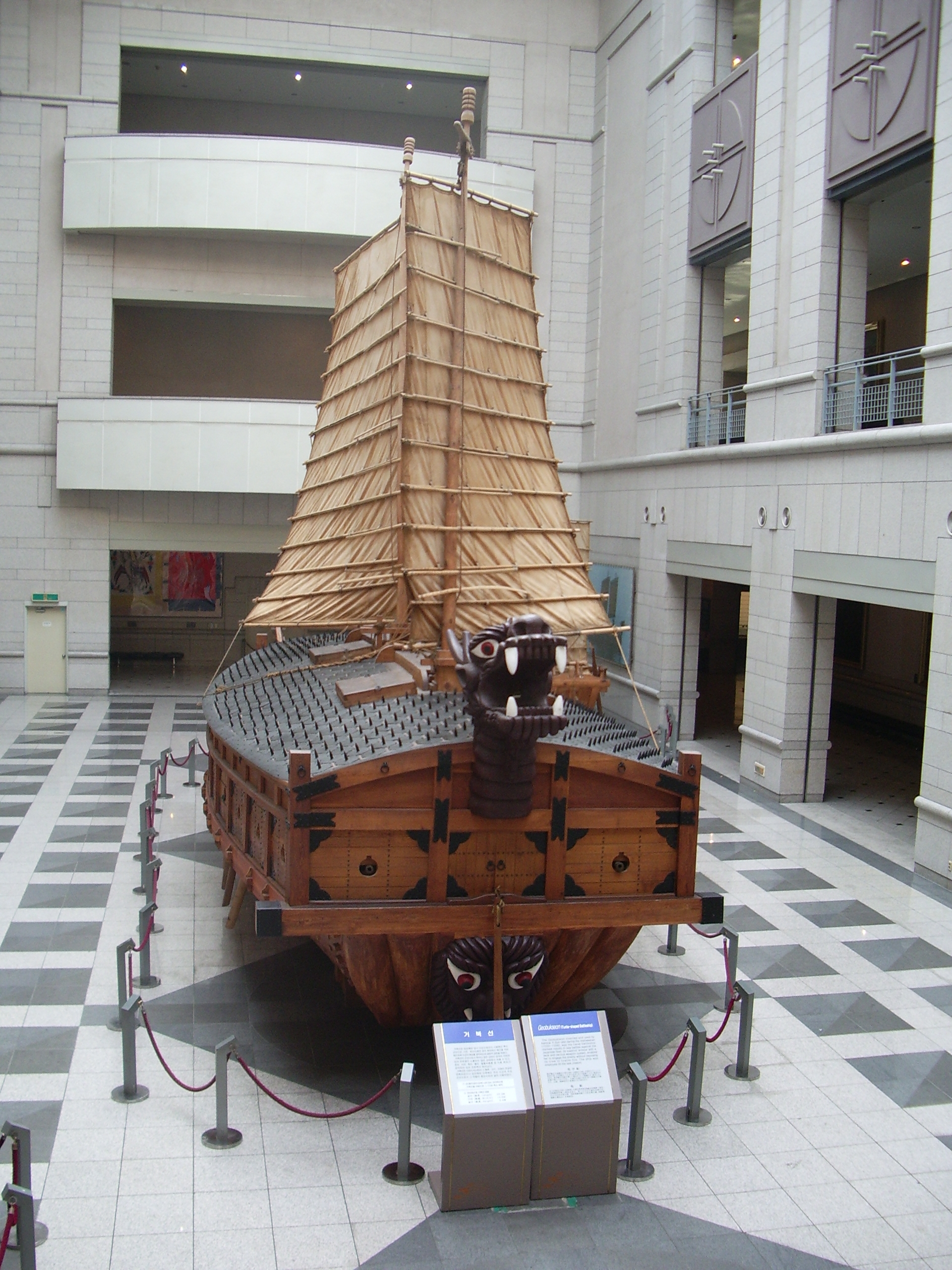
A turtle ship replica at the War Memorial in Seoul. The historical existence of the ironclad roof is disputed.

A combined Korean flotilla of 91 ships including elements associated with Wŏn Kyun and Yi Sun-sin began circumnavigating Geojedo, bound for Gadeokdo from 23 July, but scouting vessels detected 50 Japanese vessels at Okpo. Upon sighting the approaching Korean fleet, some of the Japanese who had been busying themselves with plundering got back to their ships, and began to flee. The Korean fleet encircled the Japanese ships and finished them with artillery bombardments. The Japanese fired with their arrows and arquebuses, but the Koreans kept a good distance from them, rendering the Japanese fire ineffective.

The Koreans spotted five more Japanese vessels that night, and destroyed four. After one day's fighting, Yi Sun-sin's fleet had destroyed 26 Japanese ships. The next day, the Koreans approached 13 Japanese ships at Jeokjinpo. In the same manner as the previous success at Okpo, the Korean fleet destroyed 11 Japanese ships—completing the Battle of Okpo without the loss of a single ship. The Japanese generals were shocked to hear of the Battle of Okpo, as it threatened to cut them off from Japan. After his victory, Yi Sun-sin found the burnt remains of countless coastal villages, where the Japanese had enslaved the women and killed the men.

About three weeks after the Battle of Okpo, Yi Sun-sin and Wŏn Kyun sailed with 26 ships toward the Bay of Sacheon after receiving an intelligence report of Japanese presence there. Yi Sun-sin had left behind his fishing vessels that made up most of his fleet in favor of his newly completed turtle ship. At Sacheon, the Japanese ships were anchored in the bay below a promontory where the Japanese had set up a command base.

On 8 July 1592, the fleet arrived at the bay of Sacheon, where the outgoing tide prevented the Korean fleet from entering. Therefore, Yi Sun-sin ordered the fleet to feign withdrawal, which the Japanese commander, Wakisaka Yasuharu, observed. The Japanese gave chase, embarked their 12 ships, and pursued the Koreans. The Korean navy counterattacked, with the turtle ship in the front, and successfully destroyed all 12 ships in the Battle of Sacheon. The superior firepower and armor of the turtle ships proved effective. Admiral Yi was badly wounded when he was shot in the shoulder by a Japanese sniper.

At the Battle of Dangpo, 21 Japanese ships commanded by Kurushima Michiyuki were in the process of sacking a Korean seaside village, when the Korean fleet appeared to offer a challenge. Yi Sun-sin once again feigned retreat to elicit Japanese pursuit, and then ambushed the Japanese on the open sea and killed Kurushima.

Yi Sun-sin spent the next days searching for Japanese ships, which he found at Danghangpo. Yi formed his ships in a circle while a turtle ship rammed the Japanese flagship, resulting in a melee battle. Yi wanted to annihilate the Japanese, and fearing that the Japanese might land their ships in order to escape, feigned retreat to bring the battle out to the open sea. The feigned retreat worked, and the Japanese followed the Koreans to the open sea. Yi then surrounded the Japanese ships from both flanks, resulting in all but one of the Japanese ships being taken or sunk. Yi Sun-sin sent King Seonjo the salted heads of 43 samurai officers. The next day, the one Japanese ship that had escaped was confronted by a Korean ship sent to capture it, leading to a fight when the Koreans boarded the Japanese ship. All 88 sailors of the Japanese ship were killed, and Yi had their ears cut off to be "salted and packed in a box for shipment to the court".

==== Battle of Hansan Island ====
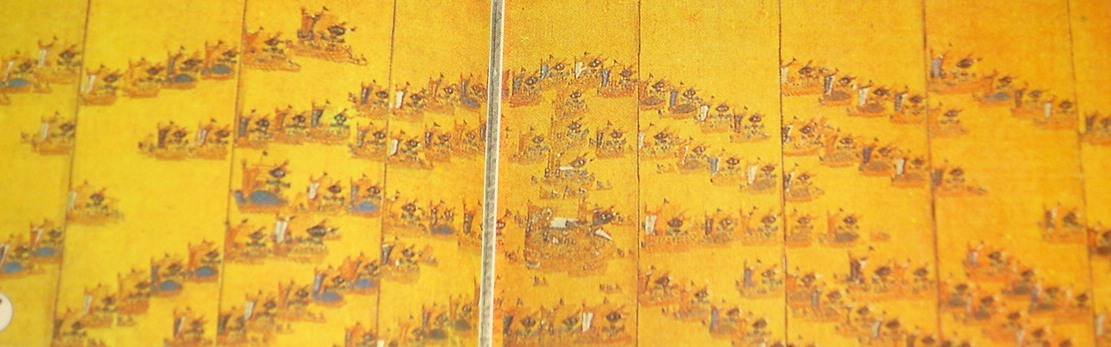
Yi Sun-sin's crane wing formation, famously used at the Battle of Hansando

In response to the Korean navy's success, Toyotomi Hideyoshi recalled three commanders from land-based activities: Wakisaka Yasuharu, Katō Yoshiaki, and Kuki Yoshitaka. Hideyoshi understood that if the Koreans won command of the sea, it would mean the end of the invasion, and ordered the destruction of the Korean fleet and for Yi Sun-sin's head to be brought to him. However, the commanders arrived in Busan nine days before Hideyoshi's order was actually issued, and assembled a squadron to counter the Korean navy. Eventually, Wakisaka completed his preparations, and his eagerness to win military honor pushed him to launch an attack against the Koreans without waiting for the other commanders.

Following this, the combined Korean navy of 53 ships, under the commands of Yi Sun-sin and Yi Ŏkki, carried out a search-and-destroy operation because the Japanese troops on land were advancing into Jeolla Province. Jeolla Province was the only Korean territory to be untouched by major military action, and served as home for the three commanders and the only active Korean naval force. The Korean navy considered it best to destroy naval support for the Japanese to reduce the effectiveness of the enemy ground troops.

On 13 August 1592, the Korean fleet, sailing from Miruk Island, received intelligence that a large Japanese fleet was nearby. The Korean fleet anchored off Dangpo, where they learned that the Japanese fleet had just entered the narrow strait of Gyeonnaeryang that divided Koje Island. The following morning, the Korean fleet spotted the Japanese fleet of 82 vessels anchored in the straits of Gyeonnaeryang. Due to the narrowness of the strait and the hazard posed by the underwater rocks, Yi Sun-sin sent six ships as bait to lure out 63 Japanese vessels. The Japanese fleet pursued and, once in open water, was surrounded by the Koreans. At least three turtle ships spearheaded the fight against the Japanese, and the Korean vessels fired cannon volleys into the Japanese. The Korean ships then engaged in a free-for-all battle with the Japanese, maintaining enough distance to prevent the Japanese from boarding; Yi Sun-sin permitted melee combats only against severely damaged Japanese ships. During the battle, the Korean navy made use of a metal-cased fire bomb that caused substantial damage to Japanese deck crews, and caused fierce fires on board their ships.

The battle ended in a Korean victory, with Japanese losses of 59 ships—47 destroyed and 12 captured. Not a single Korean ship was lost during the battle. Several Korean prisoners of war were rescued by the Korean soldiers throughout the fight. Wakisaka Yasuharu escaped due to the speed of his flagship. When the news of the defeat at the Battle of Hansan Island reached Toyotomi Hideyoshi, he ordered the Japanese invasion forces to cease all further naval operations.

==== Battle of Angolpo and Danghangpo ====
For two days after the battle at Dangpo, Yi Ŏkki and his fleet joined Yi Sun-sin and Wŏn Kyun, and participated in a search for enemy vessels around Geojedo island and the mainland coast. The admirals then received intelligence that a group of Japanese ships, including those that escaped from the Battle of Dangpo, was anchored in the Bay of Danghangpo. After sending in a scout, the fleet advanced to find 26 enemy ships anchored along the shore. Unable to form a line in the small bay, the Korean fleet formed a circle with the turtle ship in front and bombarded the Japanese. Realizing that they would likely abandon their ships and flee inland, Yi Sun-sin ordered a feigned retreat to draw the Japanese forces into open water. The Japanese took the bait, followed them, and were cut off. All the Japanese ships were sunk or burned, and only a few survivors managed to swim to shore and escape.

On 16 August 1592, Yi Sun-sin led the Korean fleet to the harbor of Angolpo, where 42 Japanese vessels were docked. In the ensuing Battle of Angolpo, Yi initially attempted a false retreat, but this was ineffective, so he arranged a relay of ships to keep up a rolling bombardment. When only a few Japanese ships were left undamaged, Yi pulled his fleet back and allowed them to escape by sea, thereby protecting the inhabitants of local villages from possible reprisals by Japanese forces stranded on land.

==== Battle of Busan ====
On the 1st day, 9th month of 1592 the Koreans carried out a surprise attack on the Hideyoshi's fleet stationed at Busan. Japanese forces lost 100 ships while no Korean ships were lost. Officer Chŏng Un and six Korean soldiers, as well as countless Japanese soldiers, were killed. However, ultimately, the Korean fleet retreated, failing to take Busan. After the battle, the Korean government promoted Yi to Samdo Sugun Tongjesa, (Note: Korean: 삼도 수군 통제사; Hanja: 三道水軍統制使; lit. 'Naval Commander of the Three Provinces') which was the title for the commander of the Korean Navy until 1896.

=== Korean militias ===
From the beginning of the war, Koreans organized militias that they called "righteous armies" to resist the Japanese invasion. These militias were raised throughout the country and participated in battles, guerilla raids, sieges, and the transportation and construction of wartime necessities.

There were three main types of Korean "righteous army" militias during the war: the surviving and leaderless Korean regular soldiers, yangbans and commoners, and Buddhist monks. By the summer of 1592, there were about 22,200 Korean guerrillas serving the Righteous Army, who tied up much of the Japanese force.

During the first invasion, Jeolla Province remained the only untouched area on the Korean peninsula. In addition to the successful patrols of the sea by Yi Sun-sin, the activities of volunteer forces pressured the Japanese troops to avoid the province in favour of other priorities.

==== Kwak Chaeu's campaigns along the Nakdong River ====
Kwak Chaeu was a famous leader in the Korean militia movement, the first to form a resistance group against the Japanese invaders. He was a land-owner in the town of Uiryeong, situated by the Nam River in Gyeongsang Province. In Korea, Kwak is remembered as an enigmatic, romantic hero. As the Korean regulars abandoned the town and an attack seemed imminent, Kwak organized 50 townsmen. However, the Third Division went from Changwon toward Seongju. When Kwak used abandoned government stores to supply his army, the Gyeongsang provincial governor, Kim Su, branded Kwak's group as rebels, and ordered that it be disbanded. When Kwak asked for help from other landowners, and sent a direct appeal to the king, the governor sent troops against Kwak. However, an official from the capital city then arrived to raise troops in the province, and he saved Kwak from troubles with the governor.

Kwak Chaeu deployed his troops in guerilla warfare under the cover of the tall reeds on the union of the Nakdong and the Nam rivers. This strategy prevented Japanese forces from gaining easy access to Jeolla Province where Yi Sun-sin and his fleet were stationed.

==== Battle of Uiryeong/Chongjin ====
The Sixth Division, under the command of Kobayakawa Takakage, was in charge of conquering Jeolla Province. The Sixth Division marched to Seongju through the route established by the Third Division, and cut left to Geumsan in Chungcheong Province, which Kobayakawa secured as his starting base for his invasion of the province.

Ankokuji Ekei, led the units of the Sixth Division charged with the invasion of Jeolla Province. The units began their march to Uiryeong at Changwon, and arrived at the Nam River. Ankokuji's scouts planted meters measuring the river's depths so that the entire squadron could cross the river. Overnight, the Korean militiamen moved the meters into the deeper parts of the river. As the Japanese troops began to cross, the militia of Kwak Chaeu ambushed them, and caused them heavy losses. In the end, to advance into Jeolla Province, Ankokuji's men had to try going north around the insecure grounds and within the security of the Japanese-garrisoned fortresses. At Kaenyong, Ankokuji's target was changed to Geochang, to be taken with the aid of Kobayakawa Takakage. However, the entire Jeolla campaign was abandoned after Kim Myŏn and his guerillas ambushed Ankokuji's troops by firing arrows from hidden positions in the mountains.

==== Jeolla coalition and Battle of Yongin ====
When the Japanese troops were advancing to Hanseong, Yi Gwang, the governor of Jeolla Province, attempted to check the Japanese progress by launching his army toward the capital city. Upon hearing that the capital had already been sacked, the governor withdrew his army. However, as the army grew in size to 50,000 men with the accumulation of volunteer forces, Yi Gwang and the irregular commanders reconsidered their aim to reclaim Hanseong, and led the combined forces north to Suwon, 42 km (26 mi) south of Hanseong. On 4 June, an advance guard of 1,900 men attempted to take the nearby fortress at Yongin, but the 600 Japanese defenders under Wakizaka Yasuharu avoided engagement with the Koreans until 5 June, when the main Japanese troops came to relieve the fortress. The Japanese troops counterattacked against the Jeolla coalition, forcing the Koreans to abandon arms and retreat.

==== First Geumsan campaign ====
Around the time of the mobilization of the volunteer army of Kwak Chaeu in Gyeongsang Province, Ko Kyŏngmyŏng in Jeolla Province formed a volunteer force of 6,000 men. Ko then tried to combine his forces with another militia in Chungcheong Province, but upon crossing the provincial border he heard that Kobayakawa Takakage of the Sixth Division had launched an attack on Jeonju (the capital of Jeolla Province) from the mountain fortress at Geumsan. Ko returned to his own territory. Having joined forces with General Kwak Yŏng, Ko then led his soldiers to Geumsan. There, on 10 July, the volunteer forces fought with a Japanese army retreating to Geumsan after a defeat at the Battle of Ichi two days earlier on 8 July.

==== Warrior monks ====
Prompted by King Seonjo, the Buddhist monk Hyujeong issued a manifesto calling upon all monks to take up arms, writing, "Alas, the way of heaven is no more. The destiny of the land is on the decline. In defiance of heaven and reason, the cruel foe had the temerity to cross the sea aboard a thousand ships". Hyujeong called the samurai "poisonous devils" who were "as virulent as snakes or fierce animals" whose brutality justified abandoning the pacifism of Buddhism to protect the weak and innocent. Hyujeong ended his appeal with a call for monks who were able-bodied to "put on the armor of mercy of Bodhisattvas, hold in hand the treasured sword to fell the devil, wield the lightning bolt of the Eight Deities, and come forward!". At least 8,000 monks responded to Hyujeong's call, some out of a sense of Korean patriotism and others motivated by a desire to improve the status of Buddhism, which suffered discrimination from a Sinophile court intent upon promoting Confucianism.

In Chungcheong Province, the abbot Yeonggyu proved to be an active guerrilla leader and together with the Righteous Army of 1,100 commanded by Cho Hŏn attacked and defeated the Japanese at the Battle of Cheongju on 6 September 1592. After the victory, the Korean leaders quarreled among themselves over who was most responsible. On 22 September 1592, Cho Hŏn, with 700 Righteous Army guerrillas, attacked a Japanese force of 10,000 under Kobayakawa Takakage. Turnbull described the second battle of Geumsan as an act of folly on Cho's part as his outnumbered force took on "10,000 of the toughest samurai", who encircled the Righteous Army and "exterminated" them, wiping out the entire Korean force as Kobayakawa ordered that no prisoners be taken. Feeling obligated to come to Cho's aid, the abbot Yeonggyu led his warrior monks against Kobayakawa at the third battle of Geumsan, who likewise suffered the same fate—"total annihilation". However, as the Geumsan salient had taken three successive Korean attacks in a row in a single month, the 6th Division under Kobayakawa was pulled back as Toyotomi Hideyoshi decided the salient was not worth the trouble to hold it, and to the suffering people of the region that was all that mattered. The Japanese withdrawal inspired further guerrilla attacks and one Righteous Army leader, Pak Chin, had an object hurled over the walls of the Japanese-held town of Gyeongju, which caused "the robbers", as Korean accounts always called the Japanese, to go examine it. The object turned out to be a bomb that killed 30 Japanese. Fearing his garrison was now under-strength, the Japanese commander ordered a retreat to the coastal wajo (castle) at Sosaengpo.

=== Siege of Jinju ===
Jinju was a strategic stronghold that defended Gyeongsang Province. The Japanese knew that control of Jinju would mean access to the ricebelts of Jeolla Province. Accordingly, an army under Hosokawa Tadaoki approached Jinju. Jinju was defended by Kim Simin, commanding a Korean garrison of 3,000 men. Kim had recently acquired about 170 new arquebuses. Kim 's men dropped heavy stones and bombs while firing their arquebuses, and they stopped the Japanase assault.

Hosokawa ordered a new assault with the samurai advancing this time under bamboo shields with covering fire from their arquebuses, which allowed them to place ladders across the walls of Jinju. A scene of carnage occurred, with the Koreans dumping rocks and delayed action bombs down on the Japanese.

For three days, the Japanese attacked Jinju with the moats becoming full of their dead. On 11 November 1592, a force of Korean guerrillas led by Kwak Chaeu arrived as the relief force, and to fool the Japanese into thinking his force was much larger than it was, Kwak ordered his men to light fires at night on the hills while blowing their conch shells. On 12 November, Hosokawa Tadaoki ordered a final attempt to storm Jinju, with heavy fighting on the northern gates, with General Kim being killed when a Japanese bullet went through his head, but the Korean arquebus fire drove off the Japanese. At that time, another Korean relief force bringing badly needed ammunition arrived up the Nam River, causing Hosokawa to break off the siege, who argued that with the Japanese deep in enemy territory and no reserves to cover his rear that it was too dangerous to continue the siege. Toyotomi Hideyoshi was enraged when he heard of the defeat, saying the Japanese should never be defeated by Koreans, and vowed vengeance. With the help of arquebuses, cannon, and mortars, the Koreans were able to drive the Japanese from Jeolla Province. The result of the battle at Jinju prevented the Japanese from entering Jeolla Province.

=== Intervention of Ming China ===
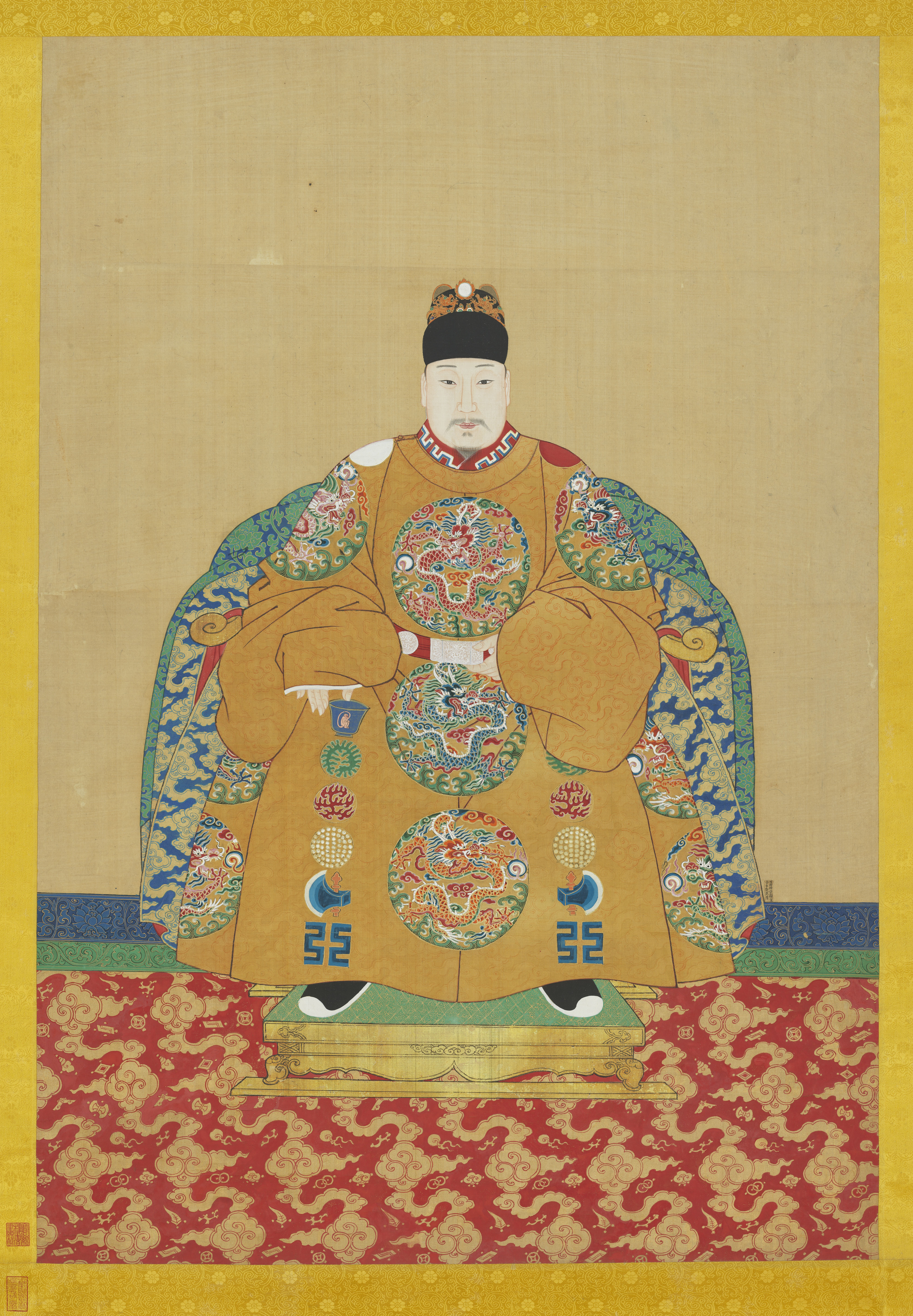
The Wanli Emperor of the Ming dynasty

Unable to repel the invasion, Korea ultimately had to rely on the intervention of Ming China to halt the Japanese advance, despite the various logistical and organizational difficulties suffered by the Japanese. Korean Court historian and politician Yu Sŏngnyong stated that the Korean naval victory stalled the entire strategy of the invaders, isolating Konishi Yukinaga's army at Pyongyang and securing Chinese waters from the feared Japanese attack, such that "the Celestial Army could come by land to the assistance" of Korea. Viewing the crisis in Joseon, the Wanli Emperor and the Ming court were initially confused as to how their tributary could have been overrun so quickly.

The Korean court was initially hesitant to call for help from the Ming, and began a withdrawal to Pyongyang. After repeated requests by King Seonjo, and after the Japanese army had already reached Korea's border with China, China finally came to the aid of Korea. China was also obligated to assist Korea because Korea was a tributary state of China, and the Ming dynasty did not tolerate the possibility of a Japanese invasion of China. The governor of Liaodong eventually acted upon King Seonjo's request for aid following the capture of Pyongyang by sending a small force of 5,000 soldiers led by Zu Chengxun. Zu, a general who had fought against the Mongols and the Jurchens, held the Japanese in contempt. This cavalry force advanced almost unhindered and entered Pyongyang, but was decisively defeated by the Japanese troops in the city. On 23 August 1592, the Chinese attacked under the cover of a heavy rainstorm, taking the Japanese by surprise. Once the Japanese realized that they outnumbered the Chinese by six to one, they allowed the Chinese cavalry to spread out over the streets of Pyongyang and counter-attacked, using their superior numbers to annihilate the Chinese. As the Chinese retreated into the muddy fields outside of Pyongyang, the samurai cut them down in the hundreds. One of their leading generals, Shi Ru, was killed in this engagement. The Japanese were elated at defeating a Chinese army, the foremost power in East Asia, but Konishi Yukinaga grew despondent during the fall of 1592 as it became clear that no reinforcements would arrive from Japan.

The fleet of Admiral Yi Sun-sin prevented Japanese ships from landing, while the Righteous Army guerrillas left the Japanese forces in northern Korea largely cut off from the forces in southern Korea. At conference in Hanseong, Konishi told Ukita Hideie that he was not certain if Pyongyang could be held if the Chinese were to attack again with greater numbers. During the later half of 1592, the Ming sent investigation teams into Pyongyang to clarify the situation. Following Chinese victory in Ningxia, the Chinese had the forces available to send to Korea. In January 1593, Ming Emperor dispatched a larger force under Song Yingchang and Li Rusong, the general who crushed the Ningxia revolt to Korea.

According to the collection of letters left by Song Yingchang, the strength of the Ming army was around 40,000, (Note: A letter by Song Yingchang in an official report back to the court on 16 February 1593 states 已到兵丁三萬八千五百三十七人員; "a total of 38,537 men have arrived".) composed mostly of garrisons from the north, including around 3,000 men with experience against Japanese pirates under Qi Jiguang. Li wanted a winter campaign as the frozen ground would allow his artillery train to move more easily than it would under the roads turned into mud by the fall rains. On 5 January 1593, Wu Weizhong led an advance force of 3,000 men across the Yalu River into Korea, followed by two battalions of 2,000 men each later the same day. At Uiju, King Seonjo and the Korean court formally welcomed Li and the other Chinese generals to Korea, where strategy was discussed.

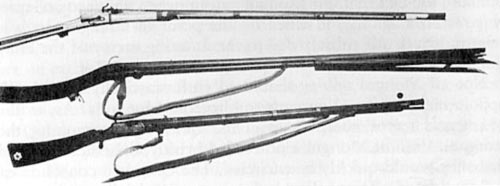
Ming-era matchlock firearms used in the 15th to 17th centuries

Thailand, a longtime faithful tributary state of the Chinese, offered to directly attack Japan to intervene in Toyotomi Hideyoshi's plans, but Ming did not accept, instead ordering it to attack Burma.

=== Siege of Pyongyang ===
On 5 February 1593, the Ming army arrived outside Pyongyang accompanied by a group of Korean soldiers. Ming general Li Rusong was appointed the commander of all armies in Korea. After initial attempts to negotiate with the Japanese defenders broke down, the two sides began skirmishing on the outskirts of the city. Li Rusong attempted to dislodge a Japanese garrison on the hills north of the city while Konishi Yukinaga attempted a night raid on the Ming camp. The Japanese night attack was beaten back by the Chinese archers, and Li ordered a feigned retreat, leading the over-confident samurai to fall into a trap, resulting in their annihilation. The Sino-Korean force consisted of 43,000 Chinese, 10,000 Koreans, Righteous Army guerrillas, and about 5,000 warrior monks. Li admitted that the Japanese infantry were better equipped with guns, but assured his officers: "Japanese weapons have a range of a few hundred paces, while my great cannon have a range of five to six li [2.4 km]. How can we not be victorious?" The city of Pyongyang was one of the most powerful fortresses in Korea, and to take it, Li's plans called for surrounding the city on all four sides, starting a bombardment under which his infantry would advance.

The Korean warrior monks, led by Abbot Hyujeong, attacked the headquarters of Konishi Yuninaga on Moranbong, coming under heavy Japanese arquebus fire, taking hundreds of dead, but they persevered. Later that same day, the Chinese under Wu Weizhong joined the attack, and with a real danger that Konishi would be cut off from the rest of his army, So Yoshitoshi led a counterattack that rescued the Japanese forces from Moranbong. After the fall of Moranbong after two days fighting, Li Rusong ordered his cannons to open fire while fire arrows and incendiary bombs set much of the city on fire. On the morning of 6 February, Li ordered an all-out assault on three sides of the city. The Chinese took heavy losses, but Li, whose horse was killed, was able to bring up the siege ladders. Li had offered 5,000 ounces of silver for the first man to get over the wall, an honor that was claimed by an infantryman from Zhejiang Province named Luo Shangzhi, who got up unto the wall while using his halberd to great effect.

Japanese defenders were forced off the walls fairly quickly, and retreated to the citadel they built on the eastern portions of the city. Chinese officers initially scoffed at the earth walls of the Japanese citadel, but after coming under fire from the Japanese arquebuses, soon learned to respect the defense. The Koreans and Chinese were unwilling to commit to a direct assault on the heavily defended fortification during the day. Instead, they left an opening for the Japanese to rally while making preparations for a fire assault on their position at night. Japanese forces sallied out of the undefended eastern walls and made a run for Hanseong, and they were hit with additional ambushes on the way back south and took heavy casualties.

The fortress of Pungsan, held by Otomo Yoshimune of the Third Division, had been abandoned and burned down by him, before Konishi's force reached it, adding to the misery of the retreat. Otomo ruined his reputation by retreating without being attacked, and as a result, the Otomo clan, one of the oldest and most respected daimyo families on Kyushu, were disgraced for his apparent cowardice. Song Yingchang's letters on 1 March 1593, described the battle in full to the Ming court. After their defeat, the Japanese shifted their strategy to hit-and-run tactics and ambushes. The use of gunpowder technology and street fighting contributed to the victory, which would permanently deter the invasion.

=== Battle of Byeokjegwan ===
Soon after retaking Pyongyang, Li Rusong also succeeded in retaking the major city of Kaesong on 19 January 1593, and met only minor resistance from the Japanese defenders. Overconfident with his recent success and possibly misled by false reports, Li Rusong advanced towards the capital city of Hanseong with his allied army of 20,000 on 21 January 1593. On 26 January, the force ran into an unexpected confrontation at Byeokjegwan with a large Japanese formation of about 30,000.

Initially, the scouting party of the group under Zha Dashou and a Korean general confronted a small band of Japanese numbering no more than 600 men. The party overran them successfully but soon ran into a much larger host under Tachibana Muneshige, and retreated to a nearby hill to defend themselves. Upon hearing of his scouting party's plight, Li decided to rush forward with the rest of his small host. He met up with his scouting party around noon, but by that time even more Japanese forces were converging on the area.

The Ming forces gradually retreated north while fighting off several waves of attacks. Li Rusong and many other generals personally fought in the brawl, and they sustained heavy casualties before they met up with the rest of their army toward the later portion of the day. At that point, the Japanese gave up further attacks and both sides pulled back. Because the Ming suffered heavy casualties among their elite retinues, Li became reluctant to move aggressively for the remainder of the war.

=== Battle of Haengju ===
The Japanese invasion of Jeolla Province was pushed back by General Kwŏn Yul at the hills of Ichiryeong, where outnumbered Koreans fought Japanese troops in the Battle of Byeokjegwan and gained a victory. Kwŏn Yul quickly advanced northwards, retaking Suwon and then swung north toward the fortress of Haengjusanseong, a wooden stockade on a cliff over the Han River, where he would wait for Chinese reinforcements. After he was informed that the Ming army under Li Rusong was pushed back at Byeokje, Kwŏn Yul fortified Haengju. Kwon's force of 2,300 men was a mixture of regulars, warrior monks, and Righteous Army guerrillas.

Bolstered by the victory at Byeokjegwan, Katō Kiyomasa and his army of 30,000 advanced to the south of Hanseong to attack Haengjusanseong, an impressive mountain fortress that overlooked the surrounding area. An army of a few thousand led by Kwŏn Yul was garrisoned at the fortress, waiting for the Japanese. Katō believed his army would destroy the Koreans and therefore ordered the Japanese soldiers to simply advance upon the steep slopes of Haengju with little planning at about 6 am. Kwŏn Yul responded to the Japanese advance with fierce fire from the fortification using hwachas, rocks, handguns, and bows. Kwŏn had trained his men to fire their hwach'as all at once, and as the Japanese were packed closely together, the volley from the "fire wagons" inflicted heavy losses. The women of Hanseong joined their menfolk, bringing up rocks in their skirts. In the course of nine assaults, the Japanese pushed the Koreans back to their second line, but could advance no further. Korean sources estimate up to 10,000 Japanese may have been killed or wounded in the process. (Note: Just over a hundred bodies were obtained by the Koreans, but the Japanese took their dead and wounded when they could, so the true count is unclear.) Facing unexpected resistance and mounting casualties, Katō Kiyomasa burned his dead and pulled his troops back.

The Battle of Haengju was an important victory for the Koreans, as it greatly improved the morale of the Korean army. By this time, the Japanese invasion force of about 150,000 men were down to about 53,000 men, with Chinese reinforcements arriving every day. Most of the Japanese were suffering from hunger, frostbite, and snow-blindness and some Japanese soldiers were so weakened by hunger that they were unable to defend themselves from tigers in the mountains. With the situation untenable, the Japanese retreated to the coast.

=== Stalemate ===
After the Battle of Byeokjegwan, the Ming army took a cautious approach and moved on Hanseong again later in February after the successful Korean defense in the Battle of Haengju. The two sides remained at a stalemate between the Kaesong to Hanseong line for the next couple of months.

Ming officials noted the supply issues in Korea. The records by Qian Shizhen noted that even after the Siege of Pyongyang, the Ming forces were already stalled for nearly a week due to the lack of supplies, before moving on to Kaesong. As time went on, the situation only become more serious. When the weather warmed, the road conditions in Korea worsened, as numerous letters from Song Yingchang and other Ming officers attest, which made resupplying from China itself also a tedious process.

By mid April 1593, faced with ever-greater logistical pressure from a Korean naval blockade of Yi Sun-sin, in addition to a Ming operation that managed to burn down a very significant portion of the Japanese grain storage, the Japanese broke off talks and pulled out of Hanseong.

=== Second siege of Jinju ===
Toyotomi Hideyoshi was especially determined to take Jinju and ordered that the previous Japanese failure to take the city be avenged. Ukita Hideie led 90,000 Japanese troops to take Jinju, making it the largest mobilization of Japanese forces for a single operation in the entire war. The Koreans, not knowing where the Japanese were going, divided their forces, with Kim Ch'ŏnil commanding the garrison of 4,000 soldiers at Jinju, who were joined by volunteers, guerrillas, a small Chinese force, and a large number of civilians including women and children, making for a total of about 60,000. On 20 July 1593, the Japanese began to construct wooden shields to allow them to advance against the walls. To the west were Konishi Yukinaga with 26,000 men, and to the north were Kato Kiyomasa with 25,000, while Ukita Hideie commanded the reserve of 17,000. On 21 July 1593, the Japanese attacked, breaking the dyke that filled the moat around Jinju, while the samurai advanced under their wooden shields, to be stopped by Korean fire arrows, cannonballs, and arquebuses. On 23 July, the Japanese attacked with wooden siege towers, which were knocked down by Korean cannon fire. On 25 July, under a flag of truce, Ukita sent a messenger to Kim, telling him that the Japanese would slaughter 10,000 Korean peasants whom they had taken prisoner if Jinju did not surrender at once, but Kim refused, and so 10,000 Korean peasants were beheaded.

The Japanese attacked with armored carts called "tortoise shell wagons", which allowed the Japanese to advance up to the walls, where the sappers would pull out the stones. But as a Japanese account complained: "They tried to attack, but from inside the castle, pine torches were thrown that set the grass alight. The soldiers inside the tortoise wagons were also burned and retreated". On 27 July, the Japanese again attacked with the "tortoise shell wagons", but this time, there was a heavy thunderstorm that prevented Korean attempts to incinerate the Japanese by dropping torches soaked in fat. The Japanese sappers broke down a section of the wall and a great rush broke out with the samurai pushed each other down as it was a great honor to be the first samurai to enter a fortress. The Korean garrison was out of ammunition and were short of swords, so many Koreans fought with wooden sticks against the onrush of samurai armed with katanas.

As usual, the Japanese took no prisoners, killing almost everyone, both military and civilian, and the Nam River ran red with blood as thousands attempted to swim across it, only to be cut down by the samurai waiting on the other side. Korean accounts mention that almost all of the 60,000 soldiers in Jinju were killed while Japanese accounts mention the samurai sent 20,000 heads back to Japan after their victory. Jinju was taken only for symbolic purposes, and instead of advancing, the Japanese force at Jinju retreated back to Busan as there was a larger Chinese force to the north.

=== Negotiations and truce between China and Japan (1594–1596) ===
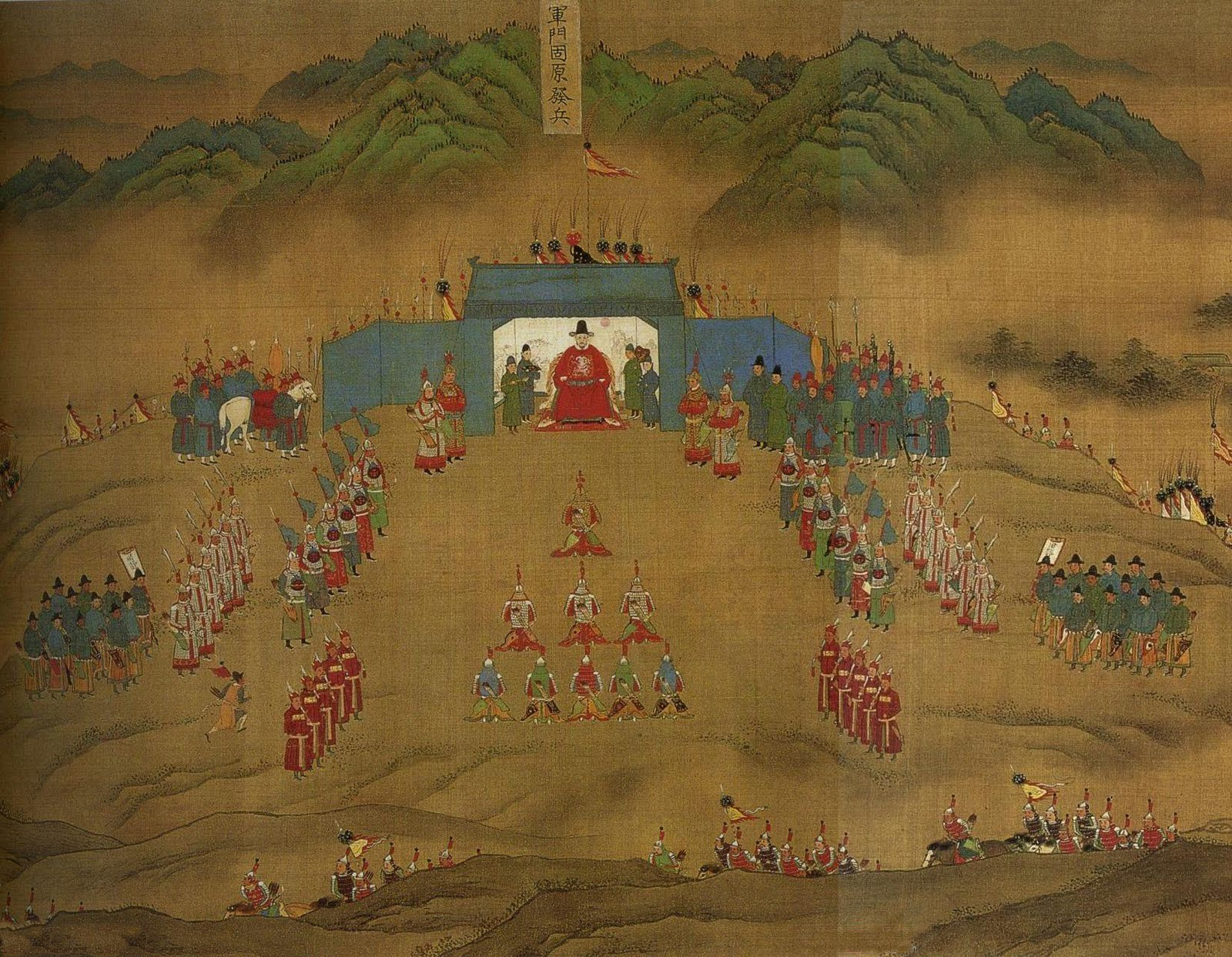
Painting of the Ming army camped in Ningxia

There were two factors that triggered the Japanese to withdraw: first, a Chinese commando penetrated Hanseong and burned storehouses at Yongsan, destroying most of what was left of the Japanese troops' depleted stock of food. Secondly, Shen Weijing made another appearance to conduct negotiations, and threatened the Japanese with an attack by 400,000 Chinese. The Japanese under Konishi Yukinaga and Katō Kiyomasa, aware of their weak situation, agreed to withdraw to the Busan area while the Chinese would withdraw back to China. A ceasefire was imposed, and a Ming emissary was sent to Japan to discuss peace terms. For the next three years, there was little fighting as the Japanese retained control of a few coastal fortresses, with the rest of Korea being controlled by the Koreans.

By 18 May 1594, all the Japanese soldiers had retreated to the area around Busan and many began to make their way back to Japan. The Ming government withdrew most of its expeditionary force, but kept 16,000 men on the Korean peninsula to guard the truce.

Once peace negotiations between China and Japan finally got underway, Chinese negotiators gave the Ming emperor the mistaken impression that he was about to deal with a minor state that had been subdued by war. Furthermore, they conveyed the idea that the Japanese regent, Toyotomi Hideyoshi, was prepared to become his vassal. Under such conditions, the Chinese sought to resolve the issue in their favor by including Japan in their tributary system of foreign relations. They would establish Hideyoshi as king of Japan and grant him the privilege of formal tribute trade relations with the Ming dynasty.

In Japan, Hideyoshi's negotiators apparently led him to believe that China was suing for peace and was ready to accept him as their emperor. Thus, Hideyoshi issued the demands of a victor; first, a daughter of the Ming emperor must be sent to become the wife of the Japanese emperor; second, the southern provinces of Joseon must be ceded to Japan; third, normal trade relations between China and Japan must be restored; and fourth, a Joseon prince and several high-ranking government officials must be sent to Japan as hostages.

Bargaining from such fundamentally different perspectives, there was no prospect whatsoever for success in the talks. Early in 1597, both sides resumed hostilities.

== Korean military reorganization ==
=== Problems with Joseon defense policies ===
Korean scholar-official Yu Sŏngnyong observed, "not one in a hundred [Korean generals] knew the methods of drilling soldiers"; rising in rank depended far more on social connections than military knowledge. Korean soldiers were disorganized, ill-trained, and ill-equipped, and they had been used mostly in construction projects such as building castle walls.

Local officers were forbidden from responding to enemy activity outside of their jurisdiction. They were required to wait for the arrival of a higher-ranking and centrally-appointed general with a newly mobilized army to take command, hindering flexibility. The appointed general often came from an outside region, and was likely unfamiliar with the natural environment, the available technology, and manpower of the region in question.

The Korean court managed to carry out some reforms, but they remained problematic. For example, the military training center established in 1589 in Gyeongsang Province recruited mostly men either too young or too old to be good soldiers, augmented by some adventure-seeking aristocrats and slaves buying their freedom, because able-bodied men of the right age, targeted by the policy, had higher priorities such as farming and other economic activities.

The dominant form of Korean fortress was the sanseong ("mountain fortress"), which consisted of a stone wall that continued around a mountain in a serpentine fashion. These walls were poorly designed with little use of towers and cross-fire positions and were typically of a diminutive height. It was wartime policy for these fortresses to serve as refuge castles and for civilians to evacuate to one. Those who failed to do so were assumed to be collaborators. The policy was largely ineffective because the fortresses were out of reach for most refugees.

=== Military Training Agency ===
Originally, the military system in Joseon was the Yangin Gaebyeongje (양인개병제). Able-bodied men worked in agriculture during the summer and trained for defense in the winter. Joseon divided these Yangin soldiers into five guards called Owi (오위, 五衛). However, as time went by, instead of receiving military training, the Yangin soldiers started paying money to avoid military service, and by the end of the 16th century, the actual number of soldiers that could be fielded was greatly reduced. During the early Joseon period, the Naegeumwi (금군인 내금위), Gyeomsabok (겸사복), and Urimwi (우림위) were responsible for the protection of the king.

As the number of Royal Guards decreased throughout the 16th century, the Training Command was established during the Imjin War. Its members were professional soldiers who received salaries and were entrusted with the task of protecting the king. Eventually, to overcome the war, a new military camp was established, and that was the Military Training Agency (훈련도감). The Training Command was also known as "Yeonhachinbyeong" (연하친병), which means a unit that directly guards the king under his supervision. They initially guarded the temporary residence of King Seonjo in Jeongneung-dong, but later protected the king in the palace itself.

In July 1593, Luo Shangzhi (駱尚志) was entrusted with the training of Huap'o cannons (화포, cannons). Luo was a skilled general of the Ming Dynasty, and focused on developing artillery forces (Pogun, 포군). The Training Headquarters was established in August, and a conscription system (Mobyeongje, 모병제) was implemented to operate it as a reserve army. They also acquired the book Jixiao Xinshu written by the Ming general Qi Jiguang to establish a training method based on the Samsubyeong (삼수병) system. The Samsubyeong system divided soldiers into three categories: Salsu (살수), who primarily used swords, Sashu (사수), who primarily used bows, and Posu (포수), who primarily used firearms. Among them, the Posu soldiers were the largest in number and played a major role.

When the existing military system (군제, 軍制) collapsed during the war, the Training Headquarters was established as a policy to address the situation. At that time, based on the suggestions of military commanders such as Ryu Seong-ryong, who held military command as the Three Provinces Military Inspector, the Training Manual was established with a focus on relieving the hungry and cultivating elite soldiers, providing a monthly salary of 9 dou and organizing them as specialized troops in artillery, combat, and marksmanship according to the Zhejiang Military Strategy in the military treatise "Gihyo Sinseo." Therefore, the Training Manual Army was organized as a specialized unit of the Three Provinces troops, with a focus on the principles of "treating many as treating few" and emphasizing "clear responsibilities and disciplined squads" based on the fundamental spirit of "Gihyo Sinseo." However, although it was organized as a specialized unit of the three types of soldiers, it was primarily organized around artillery for overcoming the Imjin War. Therefore, the Military Training Agency was initially established as artillery and later incorporated the Volunteer Corps as assassins and included gatekeepers and archers, and the organization as a three-type soldier was achieved after June of the 27th year of King Seonjo's reign.

The Military Training Agency was a temporary military camp that divided the national army into three types and trained them professionally to overcome the Imjin War. However, it gradually became a permanent military camp for the defense of the capital after the restoration.

== Chŏngyu War: second invasion (1597–1598) ==
Chŏngyu War
Army of the Right
	Mōri Hidemoto	30,000
	Emperor Go-Yozei	1,000
	Katō Kiyomasa	10,000
	Kuroda Nagamasa	5,000
	Nabeshima Naoshige	12,000
	Ikeda Hideuji	2,800
	Chōsokabe Motochika	3,000
	Ikoma Kazumasa	1,000
	Nakagawa Hidenari	2,500
Subtotal		67,300
Army of the Left
	Ukita Hideie	10,000
	Konishi Yukinaga	7,000
	Sō Yoshitoshi	1,000
	Matsura Shigenobu	3,000
	Arima Harunobu	2,000
	Ōmura Yoshiaki	1,000
	Gotō Sumiharu	700
	Hachisuka Iemasa	7,200
	Mōri Yoshinari	2,000
	Ikoma Kazumasa	2,700
	Shimazu Yoshihiro	10,000
	Shimazu Tadatsune	800
	Akizuki Tanenaga	300
	Takahashi Mototane	600
	Itō Suketaka	500
	Sagara Yorifusa	800
Subtotal		49,600
Army total		116,900
Naval Command
	Tōdō Takatora	2,800
	Katō Yoshiaki	2,400
	Wakisaka Yasuharu	1,200
	Kurushima Michifusa	600
	Mitaira Saemon	200
Subtotal		7,200
Total		124,100

After the failed peace negotiations of the inter-war years, Toyotomi Hideyoshi launched the second invasion of Korea. One of the main strategic differences between the first and second invasions was that conquering China was no longer an explicit goal for the Japanese. Failing to gain a foothold during Katō Kiyomasa's Chinese campaign, and the near complete withdrawal of the Japanese forces during the first invasion, had established that the Korean peninsula was the more prudent and realistic objective.

Japan's second force arrived unopposed on the southern coast of Gyeongsang Province in 1596. Soon after the Chinese ambassadors had safely returned to China in 1597, Hideyoshi sent approximately 200 ships with an estimated 141,100 men under the overall command of Kobayakawa Hideaki.

However, the Japanese found that the Korean army was both better equipped and better prepared to deal with an invasion than several years prior. In addition, the imperial court in Beijing quickly appointed Yang Hao as the supreme commander of an initial mobilization of 55,000 troops from various provinces across China, such as Sichuan, Zhejiang, Huguang, Fujian, and Guangdong. A naval force of 21,000 was included in the effort. Ray Huang, a Chinese-American philosopher and historian, estimated that the combined strength of the Chinese army and navy at the height of the second campaign was around 75,000. Korean forces totaled approximately 30,000 men, with General Kwŏn Yul's army in Gong Mountain in Daegu, General Kwŏn Ŭngsu's troops in Gyeongju, General Kwak Chaeu's soldiers in Changnyeong, Yi Bok-nam's army in Naju, and Yi Si-yun's troops in Chungpungnyeong.

=== Initial offensive ===
Initially, the Japanese found limited success, being largely confined to Gyeongsang Province and only launching numerous raids to harass and weaken the Korean defenders. In the early autumn of 1597, the Japanese began a more focused and sustained advance. The Japanese planned to attack Jeolla Province in the southwestern part of the peninsula and eventually occupy Jeonju, the provincial capital. Korean success in the first siege of Jinju in 1592 had mostly saved this area from devastation during the first invasion. Two Japanese armies, under Mōri Hidemoto and Ukita Hideie, began the assault in Busan and marched towards Jeonju, taking Sacheon and Changpyeong along the way.

==== Plot to dismiss Yi Sun-sin ====
The Korean navy was again to play a crucial part in the second invasion, as in the first, by hampering Japanese advances on land by harassing supply fleets at sea. However, despite his previous successes, Yi Sun-sin was both demoted and jailed by King Seonjo, largely due to a Japanese plot to deceive the Korean court and take advantage of the court's political infighting. Government officials gave direct orders to launch a surprise naval operation against the Japanese, based on a tip from a presumed reliable Japanese spy. Yi refused to obey these orders, knowing that this was a trap meant to have his own fleet sail into an ambush. This development allowed others within the court to further advance their personal agendas while Yi was severely punished. Ultimately, Wŏn Kyun was appointed in Yi Sun-sin's place at the head of the Korean navy.

==== Battle of Chilcheollyang ====
After Wŏn Kyun replaced Yi Sun-sin as head of the Korean navy, he was quick to take action and justify his newly acquired position. He gathered the entire Korean fleet, which now had more than 100 ships, outside of Yeosu, to search for the Japanese. Without any previous preparations or planning, Wŏn Kyun then had his entire fleet sail towards Busan. After one day at sea, Wŏn Kyun was informed of a large Japanese fleet near Busan. He decided to attack immediately, despite reports of exhaustion among the crews of his ships.

At the subsequent Battle of Chilcheollyang, Wŏn Kyun was outmaneuvered by the Japanese in a surprise attack. His ships were overwhelmed by arquebus fire and Japanese boarding attacks, which resulted in the destruction of his entire fleet. Prior to this engagement, Pae Sŏl (1551–1599), a naval officer who did not submit to Wŏn Kyun's leadership, kept thirteen panokseons under his command and out of the battle, instead escaping to the southwestern Korean coast. These would form the entire fighting force of the Korean navy during the following months.

The Battle of Chilcheollyang was Japan's only decisive naval victory of the war. Wŏn Kyun was himself killed by a Japanese garrison after he struggled ashore on an island following the destruction of his flagship. The victory allowed the Japanese navy to safely escort its troop ships and to support planned landing operations.

==== Siege of Namwon ====
After the disaster at Chilcheollyang, the Korean and Chinese defenses in the south broke down and the Japanese forces stormed into Jeolla Province. The garrison of Namwon became their next target. Namwon was located 50 kilometres southeast of Jeonju. Predicting a Japanese attack, a force of 6,000 soldiers, including 3,000 Chinese troops under Yang Yuan and civilian volunteers, were prepared to fight the approaching Japanese forces. The Japanese laid siege to the walls of the fortress with ladders and siege towers. The two sides exchanged volleys with arquebuses and bows. Eventually, the Japanese forces scaled the walls and sacked the fortress. According to Japanese commander Okochi Hidemoto, author of the Chosen Ki (Korean Record), the Siege of Namwon resulted in 3,726 casualties (Note: This refers to a record of the number of noses collected, as samurai during the Korean campaign were paid according to how many noses they collected in contrast to the more traditional practice of collecting heads, which were impractical to transport back to the Japanese mainland.) among the Korean and Chinese forces. The Korean forces and its leaders were largely eliminated.

Yang Yuan managed to sally out after the walls were breached, with a handful of men, to return to Hanseong. He was later executed by the Ming court because of his defeat in battle. Traditionally, samurai collected the heads of those they killed, and Toyotomi Hideyoshi had insisted that the samurai send him the noses of those they had killed as proof that they were fighting. Okochi counted the heads of 3,725 Koreans killed that day, and removed their noses, which were pickled in salt and sent back to Japan.

==== Battle of Hwangseoksan ====
Hwangseoksan Fortress consisted of extensive walls that circumscribed Hwangseoksan and garrisoned thousands of soldiers led by generals Cho Chongdo and Kwak Chun. When Katō Kiyomasa laid siege to the mountain with the Army of the Right, and attacked at night under the full moon, the Koreans lost morale and retreated with 350 casualties. The successful siege did not, however, lead to a subsequent advance from beyond Gyeongsang Province.

==== First Korean and Ming counter offensive ====
Upon the start of the second invasion, the Ming Emperor was furious about the entire debacle of the peace talks and turned his wrath on many of its chief supporters; particularly Shi Xing, the Minister of War, who was removed from his position and jailed (he died several years later, in prison). The chief negotiator, Shen Weijing, was executed. Xing Jie, the Chief Commissioner of the Liaodong Commandery, was named the new Minister of War and Yang Hao as the new Chief Superintendent of Korea; Xing Jie himself was also stationed in Korea for the remainder of the war. The Ming leadership quickly pulled in many units stationed near its border with Korea.

==== Battle of Jiksan ====
After the steady advances on land, the Japanese planned to assault Hanseong by late August or early September 1597. However, the plans were foiled by a Ming defense around Jiksan (modern-day Cheonan).

Forces under Kuroda Nagamasa formed the vanguard of the Right Army and marched toward Hanseong, which deeply disturbed the court there. Several of the Ming generals stationed in Korea suggested to the court that they pull back their forces until they could gather more reinforcements, but the Ming administrators overruled their generals and ordered them to make a stand. Thus the Chief Commander of the Ming forces at the time, Ma Gui, sent out General Jie Sheng and three other generals with an elite cavalry force to confront the Japanese forces. The Battle of Jiksan halted the Japanese northward advance.

According to Korean records, the Ming forces ran into the vanguard forces under Kuroda Nagamasa around the area of Jiksan. On the first day, they beat back a small scouting party. On the second day, the two forces clashed in earnest, and the Japanese were beaten back.

On 16 October 1597, Kuroda Nagamasa's force of 5,000 arrived at Jiksan, where 6,000 Ming soldiers were stationed. Kuroda's forces charged the enemies and was soon joined by the rest of the army, bringing Japanese forces to 30,000. Although heavily outnumbering the Ming, the Japanese were unable to do much damage due to the Ming's superior armor. According to Kuroda and Mōri Hidemoto, their firearms could not penetrate the iron shields used by Chinese soldiers, and their armor was at least partially bulletproof. The battle continued until dusk when the two sides withdrew. Kuroda launched another attack at night, this time in a pronged sweeping crane formation that sought to crush the enemies between them. The attack failed and turned into a rout that was joined by 2,000 Ming cavalry. Jiksan was the furthest the Japanese ever got towards reaching Hanseong during the second invasion.

==== Battle of Myeongnyang ====
After the debacle in Chilcheollyang, King Seonjo reinstated Yi Sun-sin. Yi Sun-sin quickly returned to Yeosu, where he found the majority of his navy destroyed. Yi re-organized the navy, now reduced to the thirteen ships that Bae Seol had held back from Chilcheollyang and approximately 200 men. On 26 October 1597, in the Myeongnyang Strait, Yi Sun-sin encountered a large Japanese fleet of approximately 133 warships, with a further 200 logistical ships in support. By making use of a narrow passage, Yi positioned his ships in a battle line that prevented the Japanese navy from making use of their numerical superiority. The Battle of Myeongnyang resulted in a Korean victory, with Yi Sun-sin retaking the naval initiative. The Koreans did not lose a single ship and destroyed approximately 30 Japanese combat ships, severely damaging another 30 (the oft-cited number of 333 ships in the Japanese fleet includes support ships, which would not be considered combat ships). Even after the victory, however, the Joseon navy was still outnumbered by the remaining Japanese navy, so Admiral Yi withdrew to the Yellow Sea to resupply his fleet and have more space for a mobile defense. After the Korean navy withdrew, the Japanese navy made an incursion into the western coast of Korea, near some islands in Yeonggwang County.

==== Siege of Ulsan ====
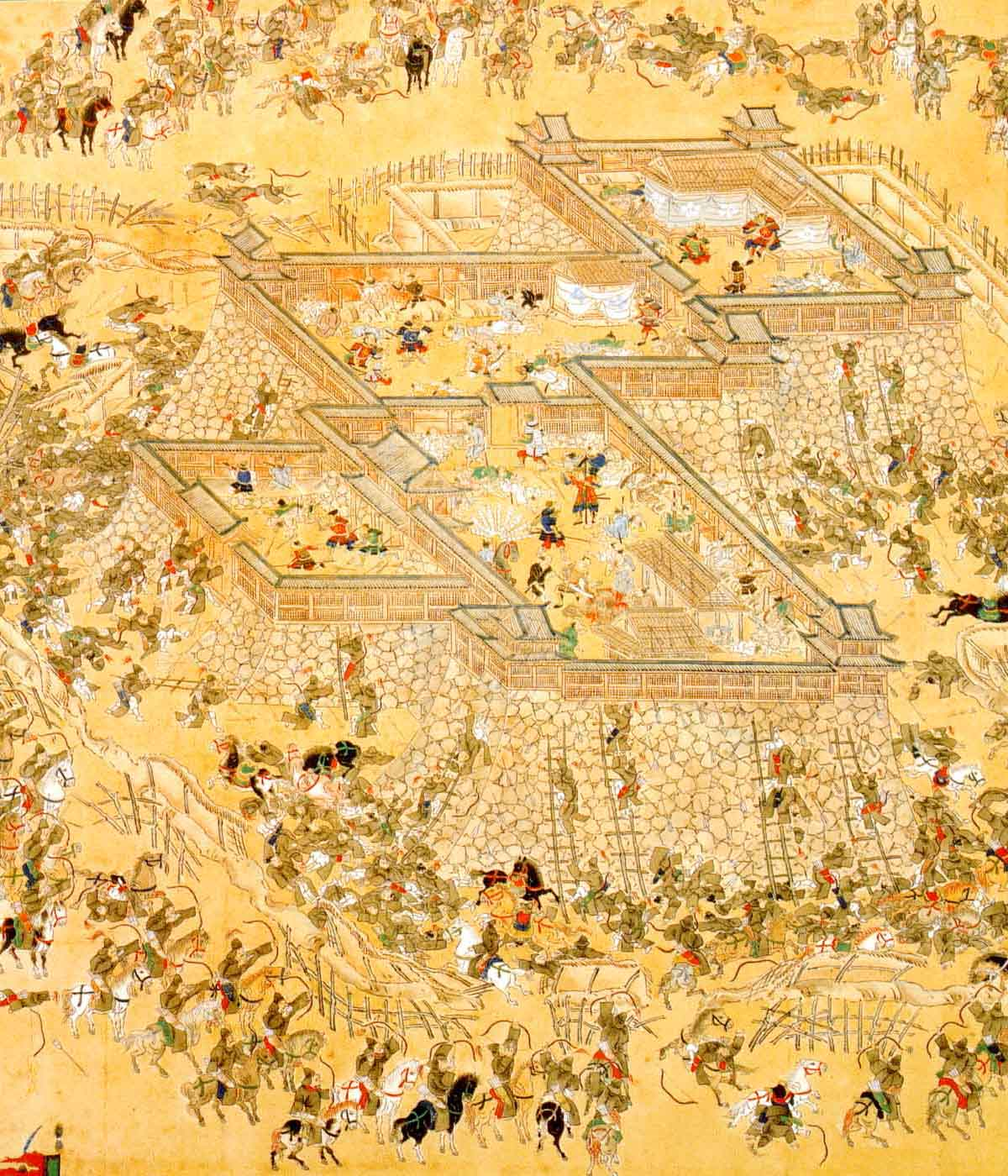
Korean and Chinese soldiers assault the Japanese-built fortress at Ulsan.

By 29 January 1598, the Joseon and Ming allied forces achieved victory in Jiksan and pushed the Japanese further south. After the news of the loss at Myeongnyang, Katō Kiyomasa and his retreating army looted Gyeongju, the former capital of Unified Silla. The Japanese forces sacked the city and many artifacts and temples were destroyed, most prominently, the Bulguksa, a Buddhist temple. Ming and Joseon forces continued to harass the Japanese, who then withdrew further south to Ulsan.

Yi Sun-sin's control of the areas around the coast of Jeolla permitted no supply ships to reach the western side of the Korean Peninsula, into which many extensive river tributaries merge. Without provisions and reinforcements, the Japanese forces were constrained to the coastal fortresses, known as wajō, that they still controlled. The advancing Ming forces attempted to take advantage of this situation by attacking Ulsan. This siege was the first major offensive from the Ming forces in the second phase of the war.

The effort of the roughly 7,000-man Japanese garrison of Ulsan was largely dedicated to fortification in preparation for the expected attack. Katō Kiyomasa assigned command and defense of the base to Katō Yasumasa, Kuki Hirotaka, Asano Nagayoshi, and others before proceeding to Sosaengpo near Ulsan. The Ming army's first assault on 29 January 1598, caught the Japanese army unaware, still encamped, and largely outside Ulsan's unfinished walls.

A total of around 36,000 troops with the help of singijeons and hwachas nearly succeeded in sacking the fortress, but reinforcements under the overall command of Mōri Hidemoto came across the river to aid the besieged fortress. Although the Japanese garrison was short of supplies, the Ming commander, Ma Gui, judged the situation to be going against them, because more and more Japanese forces began to arrive from the surrounding area and the allied forces were quickly becoming outnumbered. Ma Gui ordered a retreat, but confusion set in, and matters were further complicated by heavy rainfall and harassing attacks by the Japanese. The Chief Superintendent Yang Hao panicked and left hastily for Hanseong ahead of the army. The general retreat turned into a chaotic rout, of which the Japanese took quick advantage by attacking the retreating Ming and Joseon forces. The retreating Ming and Joseon forces suffered 20,000 losses.

=== Final allied offensive of 1598 ===
After the siege at Ulsan, the two sides remained in a stalemate for the next several months. Xing Jie decided that they would require further reinforcements to launch a final large offensive to permanently remove the Japanese presence on the Korean Peninsula.

Reinforcements from China began to pour in through most of mid-1598, with Chen Lin and Deng Zilong and their navy arriving in May. By September 1598, the Ming presence in Korea had swelled to 75,000 overall, the largest at any point in the war.

Xing Jie divided his forces into four groups, with Ma Gui leading the offensive against Ulsan yet again, Li Rumei leading the offensive against Sacheon, Chen Lin commanding the navy, and Liu Ting and Yi Sun-sin coordinating a land-sea effort against Suncheon. Just before they set out, however, news came that Li Rusong was killed by Mongolian tribesmen in Liaodong. Xing Jie decided then to remove his emotionally weakened brother, Li Rumei, in favor of Dong Yiyuan.

In June 1598, after Commander Konishi Yukinaga raised concerns about the supply situation and limited prospects for further territorial gains in the peninsula, 70,000 troops were withdrawn back to Japan, with only 60,000 left behind to guard the territory still under Japanese control. These forces were mostly Satsuma soldiers of the Shimazu clan under commanders Shimazu Yoshihiro and his son, Tadatsune. Kato Kiyomasa remained in command of the defenses of Ulsan while Konishi Yukinaga himself commanded the defenses at Suncheon. The forces at Sacheon and Ulsan continued to be engaged in a military deadlock in the months that followed.

At Ulsan, Kato Kiyomasa defended the castle with 10,000 Japanese soldiers. In September 1598, 29,500 Ming and Joseon troops tried again to capture Ulsan Castle, but all their attempts were repulsed by the Japanese. The Ming and Joseon forces withdrew with heavy losses.

==== Battle of Sacheon ====
The Chinese believed that Sacheon was crucial to their goal of retaking the lost castles in Korea and ordered a general attack. Although the Chinese made initial progress, the tide of battle turned when Japanese reinforcements attacked the rear of the Chinese army and the Japanese soldiers inside the fortress sallied from the gates and counter-attacked. The Ming forces retreated with 30,000 losses, with the Japanese in pursuit. According to Chinese and Korean sources, the forces led by Dong Yiyuan had breached the castle wall and were making progress in capturing the castle until a gunpowder accident caused an explosion in their camp, and the Japanese took advantage of the situation to rout the confused and weakened troops.

==== Siege of Suncheon ====
At Suncheon, Konishi Yukinaga defended his position at the Suncheon Castle along with 13,700 Japanese soldiers. A total of 43,000 Ming and Joseon troops tried to capture it, but their attempts were repulsed after three failed assaults, suffering 800 losses.

=== Death of Hideyoshi ===
In the fall of 1598, following the successful Japanese defense at the battles of Sacheon, Ulsan, and Suncheon, the Ming, Joseon, and Japanese forces were locked in a military stalemate in the south of the peninsula. After the death of Toyotomi Hideyoshi, the Council of Five Elders, in late October, issued orders for the withdrawal of all forces from Korea. Hideyoshi's death was kept a secret by the council to preserve the morale of the army.

=== Battle of Noryang ===
The Battle of Noryang was the final, largest, and bloodiest battle in the war. A Japanese fleet of approximately 500 ships, under Shimazu Yoshihiro, was assembled. It prepared to link up with the blockaded fleet under Konishi Yukinaga, and together withdraw via Busan back to Japan.

The Korean navy under Yi Sun-sin discovered the Shimazu fleet anchored in the narrow strait of Noryang. Noting the narrow geography of the area, Ming general Chen Lin, who led Deng Zilong and Yi Sun-sin, made a surprise attack against the Japanese fleet, under the cover of darkness on 16 December 1598, using cannon and fire arrows.

By dawn, more than half of the Japanese fleet was scattered and destroyed. During the pursuit of the remaining Japanese ships, both Yi Sun-sin and Deng Zilong were killed. Despite suffering high casualties, the battle was a great victory for the Ming and Joseon forces and a crushing defeat for the Japanese, who lost about half of their navy, and suffered the deaths of thousands of their men.

Strategically, the Japanese attained their objective by allowing Konishi Yukinaga, who was earlier blockaded by the Ming and Korean forces, to leave his fortress on 16 December with his men and withdraw unopposed by sailing through the southern end of the island Namhaedo, bypassing both the Noryang Strait and the battle, at the cost of betraying fellow Japanese generals. Konishi Yukinaga, Shimazu Yoshihiro, Katō Kiyomasa, and other Japanese generals of the Left Army, congregated in Busan and withdrew to Japan on 21 December. The last ships damaged sailed to Japan on 24 December, bringing an end to six years of war.

== Post-war negotiations ==
As Tsushima Island had suffered greatly from its loss of trade with Korea as a result of the invasions, Sō Yoshitoshi of the Sō clan, then dominant in Tsushima, undertook the lead in the peace negotiations by Japan. He sent four peace missions to Joseon in 1599 to normalize relations. The first three were captured and sent directly to Beijing by Chinese troops, but the fourth one, in 1601, successfully obtained from the Joseon court the promise of a normalizing of relations upon the return of remaining Joseon captives. As Ming troops continued to be present in Korea following the withdrawal of Japanese forces, the major incentive for Joseon for the normalization of relations with Japan was the withdrawal of the Chinese soldiers from their territory. The Ming Chinese themselves were causing havoc, and their presence continued to strain Joseon's national economy and infrastructure. In response to the Joseon request, Yoshitoshi promptly released several Joseon prisoners and between 1603 and 1604 helped the Joseon envoys to repatriate a further 3,000 by organizing negotiations at Kyoto with Tokugawa Ieyasu, by then the shogun of Japan.

In 1606, Joseon made additionally demanded that the shogun write a formal letter requesting peace, and to extradite the Japanese soldiers who had defiled the Joseon Royal Tombs near Hanseong. Realizing that the Shogunate would never agree to such a request, Sō Yoshitoshi sent a forged letter and a group of criminals instead; the great need to expel the Ming soldiers pushed Joseon into accepting and to send an emissary in 1608. The result was a return of Joseon prisoners and the restoration of diplomatic and trade relations between the two countries.

== Aftermath and conclusion ==
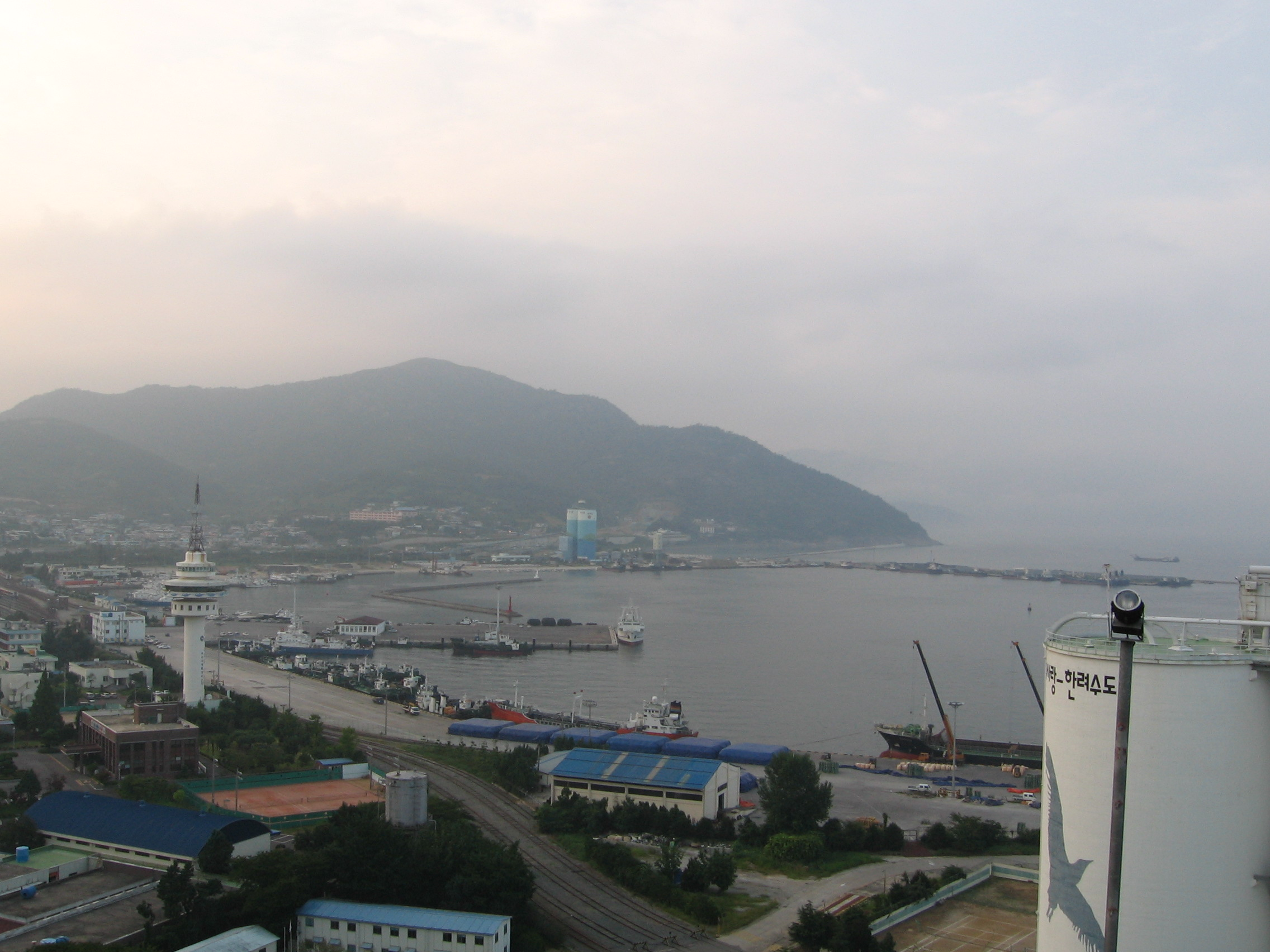
Yeosu in 2005. Admiral Yi Sun-sin's headquarters were located here.

The Japanese invasions were East Asia's first regional wars involving massed armies equipped with modern weapons. The conflict saw the regular employment of Japanese armies of up to 200,000 men, Ming Chinese armies of 80,000, and the ongoing deployment of local Korean forces numbering in the hundreds of thousands.

The invasions also stood as a challenge to the existing Chinese world order on two levels: the military, in which the war challenged Ming China's status as the supreme military power in East Asia, and the political, in which the war affirmed Chinese willingness to aid in the protection of its tributary states. This was the only military conflict between China, Japan, and Korea in the period between the 1281 second Mongol invasion of Japan and the 1894–1895 First Sino-Japanese War.

=== Losses and gains ===
Contrary to Hideyoshi's goals, the Japanese invasions of Korea significantly weakened the Toyotomi clan's power in Japan. After Hideyoshi's death, his young son Toyotomi Hideyori became head of the Toyotomi clan. Additionally, as the western-based daimyos of Kyushu and western Honshu contributed the majority of the forces used during the Korean conflict, the conflict bolstered the relative strength of the mostly eastern-backed forces of Tokugawa Ieyasu. Tokugawa would go on to unify Japan and establish himself as shogun in 1603, following the decisive Battle of Sekigahara.

Ming China was also left with a heavy financial burden. Falling tax revenues, troop desertions, a flow of foreign silver which brought unexpected problems to the Chinese economy, poor granary supervision and harsh weather eventually culminated in the collapse of the Ming dynasty. The Manchus established their rule over China as the Qing dynasty in 1644. However, the sinocentric tributary system that the Ming had defended continued to be maintained by the Qing, and ultimately, the war resulted in a maintenance of the status quo—with the re-establishment of trade and the normalization of relations between all three parties.

Given that the conflict was fought in Korea, Korea suffered the most damage of the three participants. It lost much of its military strength and civilian population, had numerous cultural heritage sites damaged or destroyed, and many of its technological advancements pillaged. In many ways the invasions proved to be more devastating than any other event in the nation's history. The peninsula suffered a reduction of arable land to 66% of the prewar total, greatly hurting Korea's mainly agricultural economy; in the years that followed, famine, disease, and rebellions were widespread throughout Korea. In Gyeongsang Province alone 90% of the land under cultivation was destroyed. Significant losses of historical archives, cultural and scientific artifacts (such as the Ja-gyuk-roo water clock), and skilled artisans resulted in a waning of Korean science. The Korean royal palaces of Gyeongbokgung, Changdeokgung, and Changgyeonggung were burned down, and Deoksugung was used as a temporary palace. The Baekjeong took advantage of the lack of internal security brought on by the invasions, and set fire to changnye – Korean government offices – in which census ledgers had been kept. The destruction of land and census registers made fiscal recovery difficult since taxation and corvée labour were based on them. The government was forced to trade rank and titles in order to obtain grain, using a practice called napsok pogwan – appointment through grain contributions – and the yangban elite, which was exempt from household taxes, exploited the occasion to increase its landholdings, thereby further depriving the central government of taxes raised on property.

George H. Jones, estimated that total casualties – both military and civilian – were one million, and combat casualties were estimated at between 250,000 and 300,000. A total of over 100,000 Japanese, 185,000 Korean and over 29,000 Chinese troops were killed, and an estimated 50,000 to 60,000 captives were taken by the Japanese throughout the war. Among those captured, a total of 7,500 were later returned to Korea through diplomatic means at the conclusion of the conflict. A large portion of the remaining captives were sold to European traders—mainly Portuguese in Macau, who then resold them throughout Southeast Asia.

Although Korea suffered the most of the three combatants, there were some significant technological and cultural transfers that resulted from the war. Japanese swords, which were sometimes collected in the battlefield from dead Japanese soldiers, would inspire some of the basic designs of later Korean swords such as the hwando. Arquebuses, which the Joseon court had initially dismissed as ineffective and useless due to their low rate of fire, were rapidly adopted during and after the war by the Joseon military and domestic production began as early as 1593. Some scholars believe that the reason the Joseon-Ming Army was not easily defeated in 1597 was in part due to the widespread adoption of arquebuses in the Joseon military.

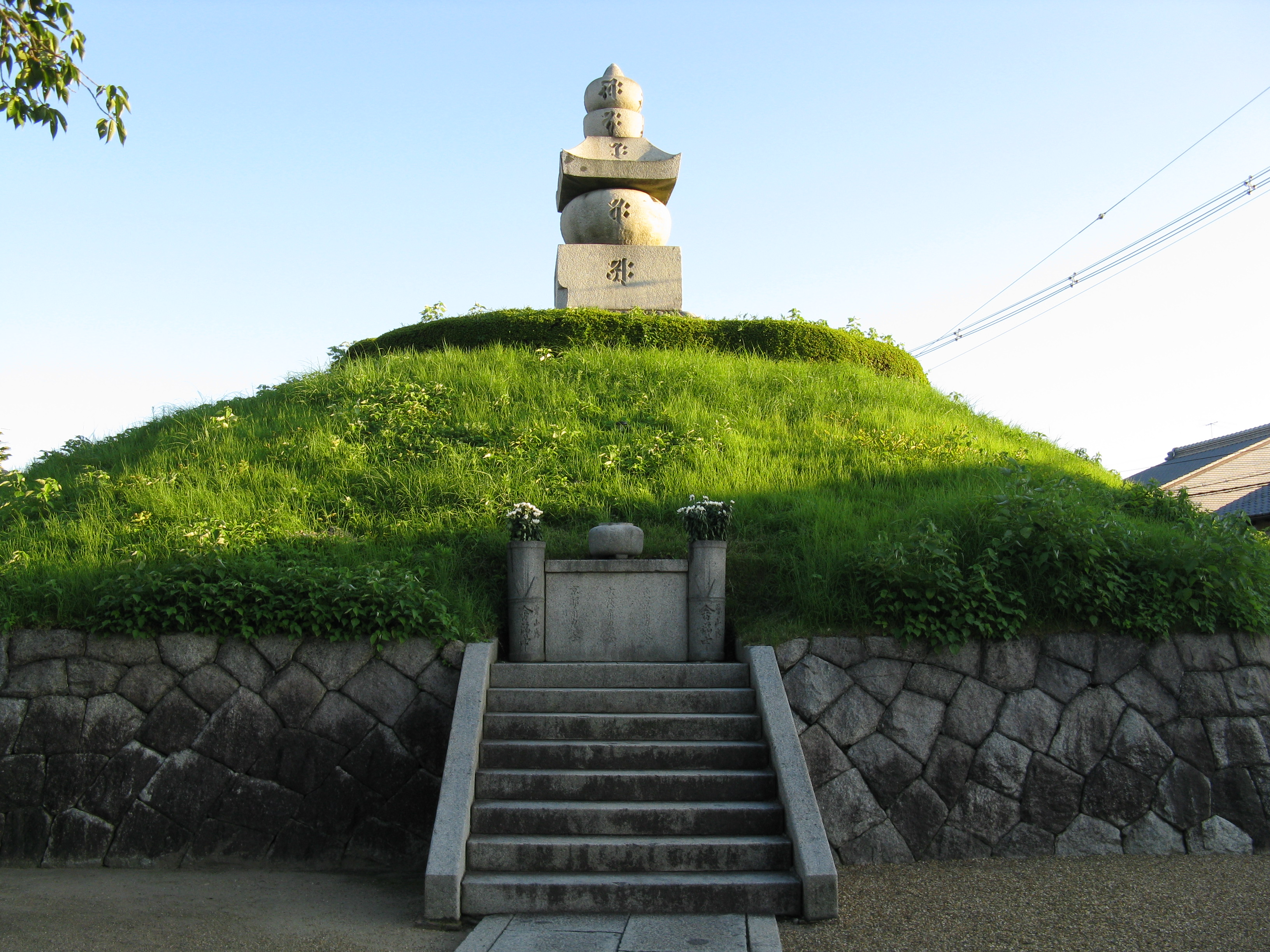
The Mimizuka mound in Kyoto contains the severed noses of approximately 38,000 Koreans and 30,000 Chinese killed during the Japanese invasions.

In Korea, many of the first converts to Catholicism were Korean captives in Japan, and records indicate more than 7,000 Korean captives converted from 1594 to 1598. Spanish missionary Gregorio de Céspedes was a prominent driver of this missionary work, and was also the first recorded Westerner to arrive in Korea and the only European eyewitness to the war.

Chili peppers, one of the most important ingredients in modern Korean cuisine, were also introduced to Korea during the war. At the time, they were known as "Japanese mustard", "southern barbarian herb" and "Japanese herb."

The captives brought to Japan, provided Japan with many cultural and technological innovations. In the years that followed, Japanese pottery and art advanced and developed a significant similarity to their Korean counterparts. Japanese typography advanced with the adoption of Chinese fonts. Because Korean pottery was highly prized in Japan, many Japanese lords established pottery-producing kilns with captured Korean potters in Kyushu and other parts of Japan. The production of Arita porcelain in Japan began in 1616 at the town of Imari with the aid of Korean potters who had been enticed to relocate there after the war.

Furthermore, Neo-Confucianism, which had originated in China and spread to Korea, was introduced to Japan because of the invasions. Many Korean scholars who were captured during the war by the Japanese would later become tutors of prominent Japanese daimyo. Furthermore, many classical Confucian texts were captured during the early stages of the war and taken back to Japan.

=== War atrocities ===
In the second invasion, Hideyoshi's orders were:

Mow down everyone universally, without discriminating between young and old, men and women, clergy and the laity—high ranking soldiers on the battlefield, that goes without saying, but also the hill folk, down to the poorest and meanest—and send the heads to Japan.

Scorched earth policies were often employed: over 60% of farmland was destroyed and burned, and farm animals were slaughtered to prevent their use by Joseon or Ming forces. Outside of the main battles, raids to acquire food and supplies from civilians were common. Captured prisoners were often mistreated or worked to near-death by starvation and neglect. The Japanese collected the ears and noses of dead soldiers as proof of their exploits on the battlefield and as a record of casualty counts. The high casualty rate of the Joseon and Ming forces, and the large number of ears collected during the campaign was enough to build a large mound near Toyotomi Hideyoshi's Great Buddha, called the Mimizuka ("Mound of Ears").

Korean armies were also known to forcefully acquire food and supplies from civilians, both on an individual and organized level. Korean bandits and highwaymen also took advantage of the chaos during the war to form raiding parties and rob other Koreans.

According to Stephen Turnbull, the Ming forces were often no better than the Japanese in the amount of destruction they caused and the degree of the crimes they committed. After the immediate Japanese military threat was neutralized, Turnbull states that the Joseon desire for the Ming armies to quickly withdraw from Korean territory was a contributing factor to the pace of the eventual peace resolution.

Rape was common during the war, and Korean women were indiscriminately assaulted and brutalized by Japanese, Chinese and Korean soldiers throughout the conflict. Records from the war indicate that Japanese soldiers "frequently decapitated all the young men of a locale and carried off all the attractive women—along with the goods they had stolen—on the backs of horses and oxen" and descriptions claim that the priorities of Japanese soldiers during the conflict were "granaries, understanding local geography, and beautiful women." Meanwhile, Joseon soldiers, such as those led by Kim Myŏn, captured not only Japanese soldiers but also many Korean women who had "been taken prisoner by the enemy." Records also indicate that Ming Chinese and Joseon Korean forces committed rape against the civilian populace during the conflict.

=== Legacy ===
The invasions are seen as the first Japanese attempt to become a global power. The partial occupation of Korea developed the Japanese concept that Korea belonged within Japan's sphere of influence, and the Japanese leaders of the late 19th and the early 20th centuries used the 1592–1597 invasions to reinforce the justification for their 20th-century annexation of Korea. Yi Sun-sin also served as an inspiration for Imperial Japanese admirals during the 19th and 20th centuries, as they often stressed the importance of studying and utilizing his battle tactics to further strengthen their own navy.

In China, the war was used politically to inspire nationalistic resistance against Japanese imperialism during the 20th century. In Chinese academia, historians list the war as one of the Wanli Emperor's "Three Great Punitive Campaigns". Contemporary Chinese historians often use the campaigns as an example of the friendship that China and Korea shared.

Korea gained several national heroes during the conflict, including Yi Sun-sin and Chen Lin. The widespread guerilla warfare fought by various righteous armies, which spearheaded the Korean civilian resistance against the Japanese invasion, had a significant impact on the common Korean populace's conceptions of nationhood and identity. The invasions and subsequent efforts by the local gentry to rally the commoners had a critical impact on perceptions of national identity in Korea, as the gentry were recorded to have sent many letters and declarations against the Japanese invaders and called upon shared Korean history, culture and beliefs to unite the Korean people.

On 12 October 2025, descendants of Joseon and Japanese commanders who participated in the Imjin War gathered for the first time in Korea, where the descendants of Japanese commanders apologized for their ancestors' brutality against Joseon citizens.

==== International awareness ====
Despite great interest in the war in East Asia, the Japanese invasions of Korea are not widely studied in the West. Many history textbooks contain only a few lines regarding the war. Examples of English-language works dedicated to the conflict include Samurai Invasion: Japan's Korean War 1592–98 by Stephen Turnbull and The Imjin War: Japan's Sixteenth-Century Invasion of Korea and Attempt to Conquer China by Samuel Hawley. In addition, both James Murdoch and George Sansom covered the topic in some detail in their general historical surveys of Japan, A History of Japan (1903) and A History of Japan 1334–1615 (1961), respectively.

== See also ==
- Timeline of the Japanese invasions of Korea (1592–98)
- List of battles during the Japanese invasions of Korea (1592–98)
- List of naval battles during the Japanese invasions of Korea (1592–98)
- Naval history of Korea
- Japanese castles in Korea
- Empresa de China

== Bibliography ==
- Alagappa, Muthiah (2003). Asian Security Order: Instrumental and Normative Features. Stanford University Press. ISBN 978-0804746298. OCLC 50447731. OL 7929693M.
- Andrade, Tonio (2016). The Gunpowder Age: China, Military Innovation, and the Rise of the West in World History. Princeton University Press. doi:10.2307/j.ctvc77j74. ISBN 978-1-4008-7444-6. JSTOR j.ctvc77j74.
- The annals of King Seonjo 宣祖實錄.
- Arano, Yasunori (2005). "The Formation of a Japanocentric World Order". International Journal of Asian Studies. 2 (2): 185–216. doi:10.1017/S1479591405000094. ISSN 1479-5922.
- "Battle of Bukgwan". Encyclopedia of Korean Culture (in Korean).
- Brown, Delmer M. (May 1948). "The Impact of Firearms on Japanese Warfare, 1543–1598". The Far Eastern Quarterly. 7 (3): 236–253. doi:10.2307/2048846. JSTOR 2048846. S2CID 162924328.
- Bulliet, Richard; Crossley, Pamela; Headrick, Daniel; Hirsch, Steven; Johnson, Lyman (2014). The Earth and Its Peoples, Brief: A Global History (6th ed.). Cengage Learning. ISBN 9781285436791. OCLC 910925445.
- Caraway, Bill. "Ch 12 – Japanese invasions: Under a Single Sword". Korea in the Eye of the Tiger. Korea History Project. Archived from the original on 2008-02-29.
- Cha, Moon-seop. 팽배(彭排) [Paengbae]. Encyclopedia of Korean Culture (in Korean). Academy of Korean Studies.
- Chase, Kenneth (2003). Firearms: A Global History to 1700. Cambridge University Press. doi:10.1017/CBO9780511806681. ISBN 9780511806681.
- Chinvanno, Anuson (18 June 1992). Thailand's Policies towards China, 1949–54. Springer. ISBN 978-1349124305.
- Choi, Gwan (November 2008). 일본에서는 임진왜란을 어떻게 인식하여 왔는가 [What Have Japanese Thought of Imjin Waeran?]. Asia Culture Research (in Korean). 15. Institute of Asian Culture, Gachon University: 233–252.
- Coyner, Tom (11 July 2006). "Why Are Koreans So Against Japanese?: A Brief History Lesson Helps Foreign Investors Do Business". The Korea Times.
- The Diary of a Militia 향병일기 [Diary of a Militia] (in Korean). National Institute of Korean History.
- "Shin Se-jun" 신세준. Doosan Encyclopedia (in Korean).
- Eisemann, Joshua; Heginbotham, Eric; Mitchell, Derek (20 August 2015). China and the Developing World: Beijing's Strategy for the Twenty-first Century. Routledge. ISBN 978-1317282945.
- Elisonas, Jurgis (1991). "Chapter 6: The inseparable trinity: Japan's relations with China and Korea". In Hall, John Whitney (ed.). The Cambridge History Of Japan. Vol. 4. Cambridge University Press. pp. 235–300. doi:10.1017/CHOL9780521223553.007. ISBN 9781139055086. OCLC 457145748. OL 34559118M.
- Embree, Ainslie Thomas, ed. (1988). Encyclopedia of Asian History. Vol. 4. Charles Scribner's Sons. ISBN 978-0-684-18901-7.
- "Battle of Bukgwan". Encyclopedia of Korean Culture (in Korean).
- Fogel, Joshua A (2009). Articulating the Sinosphere: Sino-Japanese Relations in Space and Time. Harvard University Press. doi:10.4159/9780674053823. ISBN 9780674032590. OCLC 651657288.
- Ford, Shawn (1997). "The Failure of the 16th Century Japanese Invasions of Korea".
- Gambe, Annabelle R. (2000). Overseas Chinese Entrepreneurship and Capitalist Development in Southeast Asia. LIT Verlag Münster. ISBN 978-3825843861.
- Gilbert, Marc Jason (Spring 2007). "Admiral Yi Sun-Shin, the Turtle Ships, and Modern Asian History". Education About Asia. 12 (1). Association for Asian Studies.
- Goodrich, L. Carrington, ed. (1976). "Tsu-Shan". Dictionary of Ming biography, 1368–1644. Vol. 2. Columbia University Press. pp. 1314–1318. ISBN 0-231-03833-X.
- Ha, Woo Bong (2014). "Chapter 15: War and cultural exchange". In Lewis, James B. (ed.). The East Asian War, 1592–1598. Routledge. doi:10.4324/9781315767208. ISBN 9781315767208.
- Haboush, JaHyun Kim (2016). Kim, Jisoo (ed.). The Great East Asian War and the Birth of the Korean Nation. Columbia University Press. doi:10.7312/habo17228. ISBN 978-0231540988. OCLC 944243650.
- Hawley, Samuel (2005). The Imjin War. The Royal Asiatic Society, Korea Branch/UC Berkeley Press. ISBN 978-8995442425. LCCN 2006295599. OCLC 64027936.
- Hawley, Samuel (2014). The Imjin War: Japan's Sixteenth Century Invasion of Korea and Attempt to Conquer China (2nd ed.). Conquistador Press. ISBN 978-0-9920786-2-1.
- Hooker, Richard (1996). "Toyotomi Hideyoshi (1536–1598)". Washington State University. Archived from the original on 2008-10-20.
- Howe, Christopher (1996). The Origins of Japanese Trade Supremacy: Development and Technology in Asia. University of Chicago Press. ISBN 0-226-35485-7. LCCN 95003400. OCLC 1231685345. OL 1272121M.
- Huang, Ray (1988). "Chapter 9 – The Lung-ch'ing and Wan-li reigns, 1567–1620". In Mote, Frederick W.; Twitchett, Denis (eds.). The Cambridge History of China Volume 7: The Ming Dynasty, 1368–1644, Part 1. Cambridge University Press. pp. 511–584. doi:10.1017/CHOL9780521243322.011. ISBN 9781139054751.
- Hulbert, Homer B. (1999). History of Korea. Curzon Press. ISBN 978-0700707003.
- Song, Jeong-hyeon. 이치전투 (梨峙戰鬪) [Battle of Ichi]. Encyclopedia of Korean Culture (in Korean). Academy of Korean Studies.
- Jo, Jong-Yeob (8 May 2018). "Yi Sun-shin viewed as world's best admiral by Imperial Japanese Navy". The Dong-A Ilbo.
- "Toyotomi Hideyoshi – Japanese general who united Japan". Japan101.com. 2003–2005. Archived from the original on 2012-01-19.
- Ota, Toshiro; Hanawa, Yasukiichi, eds. (1933b). Hidemoto, Okochi, 朝鮮記.
- 中興誌 [Chūkō-shi] (in Japanese).
- Ota, Toshiro; Hanawa, Yasukiichi, eds. (1933a). 脇坂紀.
- Jang, Pyun-soon (1998). Noon-eu-ro Bo-nen Han-gook-yauk-sa 5: Gor-yeo Si-dae (눈으로 보는 한국역사 5: 고려시대), Park Doo-ui, Bae Keum-ram, Yi Sang-mi, Kim Ho-hyun, Kim Pyung-sook, et al., Joog-ang Gyo-yook-yaun-goo-won. Seoul.
- "Toyotomi Hideyoshi – Japanese general who united Japan". Japan101.com. 2003–2005. Archived from the original on 2012-01-19.
- Jaques, Tony (2007). Dictionary of Battles and Sieges: P–Z. Greenwood Publishing Group. ISBN 978-0313335396.
- 陈璘后裔翁源祭祖宗 [Weng Yuan, a descendant of Chen Lin, pays homage to his ancestors] (in Simplified Chinese). Jinyang.com. 8 December 2002. Archived from the original on 2007-09-30.
- Jones, George Heber (1899). "The Japanese Invasion of Korea – 1592". The China Review, or Notes & Queries on the Far East. 23 (4–5). China Mail Office: 215–219, 239–254.
- Kang, Etsuko Hae-jin (1997). Diplomacy and ideology in Japanese–Korean relations: from the fifteenth to the eighteenth century. Palgrave Macmillan. ISBN 978-0312173708.
- Ahn, Sang-yoon. 갑사(甲士) [Kapsa]. Encyclopedia of Korean Culture (in Korean). Academy of Korean Studies.
- Kim, Kang-sik. 의병 (義兵) [Righteous Army]. Encyclopedia of Korean Culture (in Korean). Academy of Korean Studies.
- Kim, Yung-sik (1998). "Problems and Possibilities in the Study of the History of Korean Science". Osiris. 2nd Series. 13: 48–79. doi:10.1086/649280. ISSN 0369-7827. JSTOR 301878. S2CID 143724260.
- Kim, Kyong-tae (2012). "A Study on the Movements of Kato Kiyomasa in the Early Days of Imjin War –. A crisis in military merits and the possibility of peace negotiations" 임진전쟁 전반기, 가토 기요마사(加藤淸正)의 동향 - 戰功의 위기와 講和交涉으로의 가능성. Daedong Munhwa Yeon'gu 대동문화연구 [Daedong Culture Research] (in Korean and English) (77). Sungkyunkwan University Daedong Culture Research Institute: 223–268. doi:10.18219/ddmh..77.201203.223.
- Kim, Jinwung (2012). A History of Korea: From "Land of the Morning Calm" to States in Conflict. Indiana University Press. ISBN 978-0-253-00078-1.
- Kristof, Nicholas D. (14 September 1997). "Japan, Korea and 1597: A Year That Lives in Infamy". The New York Times.
- Kuwata, Tadachika; Yamaoka, Sohachi, eds. (1965). 日本の戦史 [Japanese Military History]. Vol. 5. Tokuma Shoten. doi:10.11501/2942182.
- Kwak, Nak-hyeon (1 September 2014). 2014.09 조선시대의 무예 조선의 무예훈련 - 진법(陣法) [2014.09 Martial Arts of the Joseon Dynasty: Joseon Martial Arts Training – Jinbeop]. Korea Cultural Heritage Foundation (in Korean (South Korea)).
- Lee, Janghee. 용인전투 (龍仁戰鬪) [Battle of Yongin]. Encyclopedia of Korean Culture (in Korean). Academy of Korean Studies.
- Lee, Sook-In (2009). "The Imjin War and the Official Discourse of Chastity". Seoul Journal of Korean Studies. 22 (2): 137–156. ISSN 1225-0201.
- Lee, Kenneth B (1997). Korea and East Asia: The Story of a Phoenix. Greenwood Publishing Group. p. 108. ISBN 978-0275958237.
- Lee, Ki-baik (1984). A New History of Korea. Translated by Wagner, Edward W.; Schultz, Edward J. Harvard University Press. ISBN 9780674615762. OCLC 1203951892.
- Leonard, Jane Kate (1984). Wei Yuan and China's Rediscovery of the Maritime World. Harvard Univ Asia Center. ISBN 978-0674948556.
- Lewis, James B. (2004). "The Book of Corrections: Reflections on the National Crisis during the Japanese Invasion of Korea, 1592–1598. By Sôngnyong Yu. Translated by Choi Byonghyon. Berkeley: Institute of East Asian Studies". The Journal of Asian Studies. 63 (2): 524–526. doi:10.1017/S0021911804001378. S2CID 162820194.
- Lewis, James (5 December 2014). The East Asian War, 1592–1598: International Relations, Violence and Memory. Routledge. ISBN 978-1317662747. OCLC 1100699443. OL 39528589M.
- Lorge, Peter (25 October 2005). War, Politics and Society in Early Modern China, 900–1795. Routledge. ISBN 978-0203969298.
- Martel, Gordon, ed. (2012). The Encyclopedia of War, 5 Volume Set. Wiley. ISBN 978-1-4051-9037-4.
- 中世日向国関係年表 [Medieval Hyūga Province Chronology, 1335–1600]. netlaputa.ne.jp (in Japanese). Archived from the original on 2006-11-09.
- The McGraw-Hill Encyclopedia of World Biography: An International Reference Work. Vol. 11. McGraw-Hill. 1973. ISBN 978-0-07-079633-1.
- 훈련도감 [Military Training Agency] (in Korean). National Institute of Korean History.
- Min, Hyeon-gu. 갑옷 [Armor]. Encyclopedia of Korean Culture (in Korean). Academy of Korean Studies.
- Min, Hyeon-gu. 오위 (五衛) [Five Military Commands]. 한국민족문화대백과사전 [Encyclopedia of Korean Culture] (in Korean). Academy of Korean Studies.
- Min, Hyeon-gu. 정병 (正兵) [Regular Army]. 한국민족문화대백과사전 [Encyclopedia of Korean Culture] (in Korean). Academy of Korean Studies.
- Nakano, Hitoshi (29 March 2013). "Kara-iri (Bunroku no eki) ni okeru Katō Kiyomasa no dōkō" 唐入り（文禄の役）における加藤清正の動向 [Katō Kiyomasa's Activities during Kara-iri (the Bunroku Campaign)] (PDF). Bulletin of the Research Institute of Kyushu Cultural History (in Japanese). 56. Kyushu University Manuscript Library: 35–110. doi:10.15017/1546842.
- 조선 후기 최고의 정예부대 [The most elite unit of the late Joseon Dynasty]. National Institute of Korean History.
- 훈련도감. National Institute of Korean History.
- 中世日向国関係年表 [Medieval Hyuga Country Relations Chronology 1335–1600]. netlaputa.ne.jp (in Japanese). Archived from the original on 2006-11-09.
- Nussbaum, Louis Frédéric (2005). Japan Encyclopedia. Belknap. ISBN 9780674017535. OCLC 58053128.
- "Early Joseon Period". History. Office of the Prime Minister.
- Oh, Yun-ju (12 October 2025). "임진왜란은 참혹한 침략전쟁…선조 잘못 사죄합니다" ["The Imjin War was a brutal war of aggression… I apologize for Seonjo's wrongdoing"]. The Hankyoreh (in Korean).
- Park, Yune-hee (1978). Admiral Yi Sun-shin and His Turtleboat Armada. Hanjin Publishing Company.
- Perez, Louis (2013). Japan at War: An Encyclopedia. Santa Barbara, California: ABC-CLIO. ISBN 978-1598847413.
- Perrin, Noel (1979). Giving up the gun: Japan's reversion to the sword, 1543–1879. Boston: David R Godine. ISBN 978-0879237738.
- Qian, Shizhen (1989). Wang, Deyi (ed.). 征東實紀: 一卷 [Records of the Eastern Expedition: One juan] (in Chinese). Taipei: Xinwenfeng.
- Rockstein, Edward D. (1993). Strategic And Operational Aspects of Japan's Invasions of Korea 1592–1598. Naval War College.
- Roh, Young-koo (2004). "Yi Sun-shin, an Admiral Who Became a Myth" (PDF). The Review of Korean Studies. 7 (3). Academy of Korean Studies: 15–36. ISSN 2733-9351.
- Sajima, Naoko; Tachikawa, Kyochi (2009). "Japanese Sea Power: A Maritime Nation's Struggle for Identity" (PDF). Foundations of International Thinking on Sea Power (2). Sea Power Centre, Australia. ISBN 978-0642297051. ISSN 1835-7679. Archived from the original (PDF) on 2017-07-03.
- Sansom, George (1961). A History of Japan 1334–1615. Stanford: Stanford University Press. ISBN 978-0804705257. OCLC 1356385668. OL 7928482M.
- Seth, Michael J. (2010). A History of Korea: From Antiquity to the Present. Rowman & Littlefield Publishers. ISBN 978-0742567177.
- Ford, Shawn; Pang, Loretta (1997). "History 241W: Asian History from the 15th Century to Present". Horizons. Kapi'olani Community College – via University of Hawaii.
- Shin, Michael D. (2014). Korean History in Maps. Cambridge University Press. ISBN 978-1107490239. OCLC 906930730.
- "Shin Se-jun" 신세준. Doosan Encyclopedia (in Korean).
- Shunpo, Naito (1976). Bunroku keichō no eki ni okeru hironin no kenkyū 文禄・慶長役における被擄人の研究 [Research on the subjects of the Bunroku and Keicho eras]. University of Tokyo Press. doi:10.11501/12279602. OCLC 1021014147.
- Sohn, Pow-key (April–June 1959). "Early Korean Painting". Journal of the American Oriental Society. 79 (2): 96–103. doi:10.2307/595851. ISSN 0003-0279. JSTOR 595851.
- Song, Yingchang (1986). 經略復國要編 [Important Documents from the Military Commissioner's Restoration of the State] (in Chinese). Vol. 2 vols. Taipei: Taiwan Xuesheng Shuju.
- Spence, Jonathan D. (1999). The search for modern China. W.W. Norton. ISBN 9780393973518.
- Strauss, Barry (Summer 2005). "Korea's Legendary Admiral". MHQ: The Quarterly Journal of Military History. 17 (4): 52–61. ISSN 1040-5992. OCLC 1144643140.
- Swope, Kenneth M. (2006). "Beyond Turtleboats: Siege Accounts from Hideyoshi's Second Invasion of Korea, 1597–1598". Sungkyun Journal of East Asian Studies. 6 (2). Academy of East Asian Studies: 177–206. ISSN 1598-2661.
- Swope, Kenneth M. (2005). "Crouching Tigers, Secret Weapons: Military Technology Employed During the Sino-Japanese-Korean War, 1592–1598". The Journal of Military History. 69 (1): 11–42. doi:10.1353/jmh.2005.0059. ISSN 1543-7795. S2CID 159829515.
- Swope, Kenneth M. (December 2002). "Deceit, Disguise, and Dependence: China, Japan, and the Future of the Tributary System, 1592–1596". The International History Review. 24 (4): 757–782. doi:10.1080/07075332.2002.9640980. ISSN 0707-5332. S2CID 154827808.
- Swope, Kenneth M. (2009). A Dragon's Head and a Serpent's Tail: Ming China and the First Great East Asian War, 1592–1598. University of Oklahoma Press. ISBN 978-0806155814. OCLC 949865853.
- Swope, Kenneth M. (2020). "Ming Grand Strategy during the Great East Asian War, 1592–1598". In Haggard, Stephan; Kang, David C. (eds.). East Asia in the World: Twelve Events That Shaped the Modern International Order. Cambridge University Press. pp. 108–128. doi:10.1017/9781108807401.007.
- Szczepanski, Kallie (6 March 2017). "The Imjin War, 1592–98". ThoughtCo. Archived from the original on 2020-07-14.
- Tang, Kaijian (2015). Setting Off from Macau: Essays on Jesuit History during the Ming and Qing Dynasties. Brill. ISBN 978-9004305526.
- 조선 후기 최고의 정예부대 [The most elite unit of the late Joseon Dynasty] (in Korean). National Institute of Korean History.
- Tsai, Shih-shan Henry (1996). The Eunuchs in the Ming Dynasty. SUNY Press. pp. 119–120. ISBN 978-0791426876.
- Turnbull, Stephen (2002). Samurai Invasion: Japan's Korean War 1592–98. Cassell & Co. ISBN 978-0304359486. OCLC 50289152.
- Turnbull, Stephen (2008). The Samurai Invasion of Korea 1592–98. Osprey Publishing Ltd. ISBN 9781846032547. OCLC 244583893.
- Turnbull, Stephen (2012). The Samurai Invasion of Korea 1592–98. Osprey Publishing. ISBN 978-1782007128.
- "Veritable Records of Seonjo". Veritable Records of the Joseon Dynasty (in Korean and Literary Chinese). 1567–1608 – via National Institute of Korean History.
- Villiers, John (10 June 1980). "Silk and Silver: Macau, Manila and Trade in the China Seas in the Sixteenth Century" (PDF). Journal of the Royal Asiatic Society Hong Kong Branch. 20: 66–80. ISSN 1991-7295. JSTOR 23889547.
- Ma, Xinru; Kang, David C. (2024). Beyond Power Transitions: The Lessons of East Asian History and the Future of U.S.-China Relations. Columbia Studies in International Order and Politics. New York: Columbia University Press. ISBN 978-0-231-55597-5.
- Wang, Q. Edward; Sun, Weiguo (2019). "The East Asian War of 1592–98: International Perspectives—Introduction". Chinese Studies in History. 52 (1): 1–4. doi:10.1080/00094633.2019.1606646.
- Wang, Yuan-kang (2010). Harmony and War: Confucian Culture and Chinese Power Politics. Columbia University Press. ISBN 978-0231522403.
- White, Matthew (January 2012). "Selected Death Tolls for Wars, Massacres and Atrocities Before the 20th Century". Historical Atlas of the Twentieth Century.
- Yi, Gwang-pyo; Yoon, Wang-joon (20 February 2007). 500년 전의 첨단과학 다시 숨쉰다…자격루 복원-작동 성공 [Cutting-edge science from 500 years ago breathes again… restoration and operation of Jagyeongnu succeeds]. The Dong-A Ilbo (in Korean).
- Yi, Sun-sin (2000). Nanjung Ilgi 乱中日記 : 壬辰倭乱の記錄. Translated by Kitajima, Manji. Tokyo: Heibonsha Press.
- Yi, Sun-sin (17 September 1592). 충무공 이순신. 제 4차 부산포 승첩을 아뢰는 계본, 만력 20년(1592) 9월 17일 [Report announcing the 4th Busanpo victory] (in Korean).
- Yi, Sun-sin (1977). Sohn, Pow-key (ed.). Nanjung ilgi. War Diary of Admiral Yi Sun-sin. Translated by Ha, Tae Hung. Seoul, Korea: Yonsei University Press. ISBN 8971410183.
- Yi, Sun-sin (1935). Korean History Editorial Society (ed.). Ranchū nikkisō : jinshin jōsō 亂中日記草 : 壬辰狀草 (in Japanese and Literary Chinese). Korea Governor-General's Office. OCLC 56041880.
- Zhang, Tingyu; et al. (1739). History of Ming (in Chinese) – via Wikisource.
