= Timeline of the Imjin War =

Notable events in the 1592–1598 Japanese invasions of Korea in chronological order

Japanese invasions of Korea (1592–1598)

The following is a timeline of the Imjin War.

== Pre-war ==
Year	Date	Event
1544		Wokou raid Saryang-jin
1555		Wokou raid Joseon
1583		Yi Sun-sin defeats a Jurchen force near the Tumen River
1587		Yi Sun-sin is demoted to a common soldier after annoying Yi Il
1587		Toyotomi Hideyoshi sends an insulting letter to the Joseon court
1588		Toyotomi Hideyoshi sends envoys asking the Joseon court to aid them in invading the Ming dynasty
1589		Toyotomi Hideyoshi orders Shō Nei of the Ryukyu Kingdom to suspend trade with the Ming dynasty, but he refuses and reports the matter to Ming envoys instead
1590	4 August	Siege of Odawara (1590): The Later Hōjō clan is defeated and most of the northern daimyō submit without a fight
1590	August	Joseon envoys arrived in Japan
1591	March	Envoys return to Joseon and refuse to aid Japan in invading the Ming dynasty
1591	8 March	Yi Sun-sin is appointed to the post Left Naval Commander of Jeolla following Yu Sŏngnyong's recommendation
1591		A Chinese trader captured by the Japanese sends a message to Zhejiang stating that 100,000 Japanese troops are being amassed to invade the following year
1591		The Wanli Emperor orders coastal defenses to be strengthened
1591		Joseon sends a request for help to the Ming dynasty
1592	April	The Japanese army assembles at Nagoya

== 1592 ==
Year	Date	Event
1592	23 May	The Japanese First Division under Konishi Yukinaga and Sō Yoshitoshi arrive at Busan
1592	24 May	Siege of Busanjin: Japanese First Division takes Busan
1592	24 May	Battle of Dadaejin: Japanese First Division takes a neighboring coastal fort
1592	25 May	Siege of Dongnae: Japanese First Division takes Dongnae
1592	26 May	Japanese First Division takes Yangsan and Miryang
1592	28 May	Japanese First Division takes Daegu
1592	28 May	Japanese Second Division under Katō Kiyomasa arrives in Busan and takes Ulsan, Gyeongju, Yeongcheon, Sinnyeong, and Gumi
1592	29 May	Japanese Third Division under Kuroda Nagamasa arrives west of Busan and takes Gimhae before heading north
1592	3 June	Battle of Sangju: Japanese First Division takes Sangju
1592	4 June	Japanese Third Division takes Cheongju
1592	5 June	Japanese First and Second divisions meet up at Mungyeong
1592	6 June	Battle of Chungju: Japanese First Division takes Chungju
1592	8 June	Gwanghae is installed as prince
1592	9 June	The Joseon royal family departs from Hanseong and the city descends into chaos
1592	11 June	Katō Kiyomasa's Second Division crosses the Han River
1592	12 June	Japanese First Division takes Hanseong and the Second Division arrives a few hours later
1592	13 June	Yi Sun-sin's fleet of 39 warships depart from Yeosu
1592	14 June	Yi Sun-sin arrives at Dangpo to rendezevouz with Wŏn Kyun, who doesn't show up
1592	15 June	Wŏn Kyun arrives at Dangpo with 4 warships and together they depart for Geoje
1592	16 June	Kuroda Nagamasa's Third Division and Ukita Hideie's Eighth Division arrive at Hanseong while the other five divisions have landed at Busan
1592	16 June	Yi Sun-sin's fleet reaches Okpo where they find Japanese ships at anchor
1592	16 June	The Joseon royal family arrives at Pyeongyang
1592	17 June	Battle of Okpo: Yi Sun-sin and Wŏn Kyun defeat a fleet of 50 Japanese transport ships, but split up and return home after receiving news of the fall of Hanseong
1592	18 June	Yi Sun-sin arrives back at Yeosu
1592	7 July	Battle of Imjin River (1592): The Korean defense is defeated and the three vanguard Japanese divisions cross the river and take Gaeseong
1592	8 July	Battle of Sacheon (1592): Yi Sun-sin destroys more than 12 large Japanese ships at Sacheon
1592	9 July	Battle of Dangpo: Yi Sun-sin defeats a fleet of 21 Japanese warships
1592	12 July	Battle of Danghangpo: Yi Sun-sin's fleet destroys 26 Japanese ships
1592	16 July	Konishi Yukinaga arrives at the Daedong River and Kuroda Nagamasa joins him a few days later
1592	18 July	The Korean fleet dissolves and each commander heads back to their respective ports to recuperate
1592	19 July	Seonjo of Joseon departs from Pyeongyang and heads for Yeongbyeon
1592	24 July	Siege of Pyongyang (1592): Japanese First and Third divisions take Pyeongyang
1592	26 July	Seonjo of Joseon meets a token force of 1,000 from the Ming dynasty at Gwaksan
1592	30 July	Seonjo of Joseon arrives at Uiju with Tai Zhaobian and Shi Ru
1592	July	Kwak Chaeu leads a force of 1,000 in resistance against Japanese occupation in the south but later enters government service when he's accused of robbery
1592	7 August	Ko Kyŏngmyŏng dies in a failed attack on Japanese held Geumsan
1592	8 August	The Ming dynasty decides to dispatch troops to Joseon
1592	10 August	Yi Ŏkki joins with Yi Sun-sin at Yeosu to practice naval formations
1592	12 August	Yi Sun-sin and Yi Ŏkki rendezvous with Wŏn Kyun at Noryang
1592	14 August	Battle of Hansan Island: Yi Sun-sin, Yi Ŏkki, and Wŏn Kyun defeat a Japanese fleet
1592	15 August	Battle of Hansan Island: Yi Sun-sin, Yi Ŏkki, and Wŏn Kyun defeat another Japanese fleet at Angolpo
1592	15 August	Zhao Chengxun arrives at Uiju with a force of 5,000
1592	23 August	Battle of Pyongyang (1592): Zhao Chengxun and Shi Ru attack Pyeongyang and are defeated
1592	August	Kim Ch'ŏnil entrenches himself on Ganghwa Island
1592	6 September	Battle of Cheongju: Cho Hŏn takes Cheongju
1592	12 September	Konishi Yukinaga heads to Hanseong to discuss future defense plans with Ukita Hideie
1592	22 September	Cho Hŏn attacks Geumsan and dies and the monk Yeonggyu follows up soon after and dies as well
1592	29 September	Yi Sun-sin and Yi Ŏkki set sail from Yeosu with a reconstructed fleet of 166 ships and Wŏn Kyun joins them the day after
1592	3 October	Kuroda Nagamasa fails to take Yeonan
1592	4 October	Yi Sun-sin's fleet reaches Nakdong River
1592	4 October	A 50-day armistice is signed by Shen Weijing at Pyeongyang
1592	5 October	Battle of Busan (1592): Yi Sun-sin's fleet bombards the Japanese fleet and destroys 130 ships before retreating
1592	6 October	The Wanli Emperor sends an edict to Seonjo of Joseon stating his support for driving out the Japanese
1592	6 October	Yi Sun-sin's fleet is disbanded and he returns home for resupplies
1592	6 October	Kuroda Nagamasa fails to take Yeonan again
1592	12 October	Pak Chin retakes Gyeongju
1592	October	Hamgyong campaign: Katō Kiyomasa's Second Division occupies Hamgyeong
1592	October	Nurhaci offers to join the war against the Japanese but is rejected by both the Ming dynasty and Joseon
1592	13 November	Siege of Jinju (1592): Japanese Seventh Division fails to take Jinju
1592	23 December	Shen Weijing returns to Pyeongyang and tells the Japanese that there would be no further negotiations until they retreat all the way back to Busan
1592	29 December	Konishi Yukinaga tells Shen Weijing that they would withdraw from Pyeongyang if the Ming dynasty gave them rights to ports along China's coast

== 1593 ==
Year	Date	Event
1593	5 January	Wu Weizhong leads 5,000 men across the Yalu River
1593	26 January	Li Rusong's army of 35,000 reaches the Yalu River
1593	6 February	Siege of Pyongyang (1593): The allied Ming-Joseon army lays siege to Pyeongyang
1593	6 February	The Ayutthaya Kingdom's offer to send ships is rejected by the Ming dynasty
1593	8 February	Siege of Pyongyang (1593): Konishi Yukinaga's First Division retreats from Pyeongyang, ending the siege
1593	17 February	Konishi Yukinaga's remaining men reach Hanseong
1593	19 February	Li Rusong takes Gaeseong
1593	22 February	Katō Kiyomasa and Nabeshima Naoshige's Second Division depart from Anbyeon and make their way back to Hanseong
1593	27 February	Battle of Byeokjegwan: The Ming army's advance towards Hanseong is repelled
1593	8 March	Yi Sun-sin leaves for Geoje where he and Wŏn Kyun rendezvous
1593	9 March	Yi Ŏkki joins Yi Sun-sin and Wŏn Kyun
1593	14 March	Battle of Haengju: The Japanese fail to take Haengju on the Han River
1593	20 March	Yi Sun-sin destroys 10 Japanese vessels near Ungchon
1593	24 March	Yi Sun-sin attacks Ungchon and releases five Korean prisoners
1593	3 May	Yi Sun-sin returns to Yeosu
1593	7 May	Li Rusong returns to Gaeseong
1593	18 May	The Japanese abandon Hanseong
1593	19 May	The Ming army retakes Hanseong
1593	May	"Big Sword" Liu Ting crosses the Yalu River with 5,000 Southern Chinese reinforcements
1593	22 June	Xie Yongzu and Yu Yihuan negotiate with Konishi Yukinaga at Nagoya
1593	June	The Japanese retreat to 17 fortresses on Korea's southern coast and the allied army makes camp at Uiryeong and Changnyeong
1593	27 July	Siege of Jinju (1593): The Japanese conduct a massacre at Jinju
1593	1 September	Hideyoshi Toyotomi gives the order to withdraw 40,000 troops from Korea.
1593	16 September	Most of the Ming army departs from Korea, leaving a garrison force of 16,000
1593	24 October	Seonjo of Joseon returns to Hanseong

== 1594 ==
Year	Date	Event
1594	April	Yi Sun-sin destroys 39 Japanese ships
1594	December	All Ming soldiers are withdrawn from Korea

== 1596 ==
Year	Date	Event
1596	22 October	Negotiations break down as Hideyoshi Toyotomi realizes the Ming and Joseon envoys aren't in Japan to show obeisance to the greatness of Nippon civilization

== 1597 ==
Year	Date	Event
1597	1 March	Katō Kiyomasa lands at Jukdo with 10,000 men
1597	2 March	Konishi Yukinaga arrives at Busan with 7,000 men
1597	12 April	Yi Sun-sin is arrested and replaced by Wŏn Kyun
1597	16 May	Yi Sun-sin is released from prison
1597	June	Yang Yuan crosses the Yalu River with 3,000 soldiers
1597	31 July	Wŏn Kyun leads a fleet east from Hansando but returns after meeting a small squadron of Japanese ships at Geoje
1597	July	Yang Yuan reaches Namweon
1597	15 August	Ma Gui arrives at Hanseong with 1,000 troops
1597	17 August	Wŏn Kyun takes the entire fleet and sails east to Busan
1597	20 August	Battle of Chilcheollyang: The Korean fleet is repelled near Busan
1597	28 August	Battle of Chilcheollyang: Nearly the entire Korean fleet is destroyed, Wŏn Kyun and Yi Ŏkki are both killed
1597	August	Total Japanese forces in Korea reach 141,900
1597	11 September	Ukita Hideie marches west from Busan with a force of 49,600
1597	13 September	Yi Sun-sin is reinstated
1597	23 September	Siege of Namwon: A Japanese army of 50,000 lays siege to Namweon
1597	26 September	Siege of Namwon: The Japanese take Namweon
1597	26 September	The Japanese take Hwangseoksan
1597	28 September	Yi Sun-sin arrives at Hoeryeong
1597	30 September	The Japanese take Jeonju
1597	4 October	Yang Yuan retreats to Hanseong
1597	8 October	Yi Sun-sin scares off an advance Japanese scout party at Oranpo
1597	16 October	Battle of Jiksan: The Japanese advance north is checked by Ming forces and forced to retreat
1597	17 October	The Japanese take Oranpo but are repelled at Jindo
1597	24 October	200 Japanese ships approach Oranpo
1597	26 October	Battle of Myeongnyang: The Japanese fleet is repelled by Yi Sun-sin
1597	23 November	Ma Gui arrives at Jeonju

== 1598 ==
Year	Date	Event
1598	26 January	Yang Hao, Ma Gui, and Kwŏn Yul meet at Gyeongju, forming an army of 50,000
1598	29 January	Siege of Ulsan: The allied army lays siege to Ulsan
1598	19 February	Siege of Ulsan: The allies fail to take Ulsan and retreat, suffering heavy casualties
1598	23 May	Yi Sun-sin leads his ships to establish base at Gogeum
1598	May	Chen Lin arrives at Tongjak with the Ming fleet
1598	26 June	Toyotomi Hideyoshi orders the withdrawal of half his troops from Korea
1598	July	Liu Ting arrives at Hanseong with 20,000 troops
1598	12 August	Yang Hao leaves Hanseong to face charges against him in Beijing
1598	17 August	Chen Lin arrives at Gogeum and joins with Yi Sun-sin
1598	18 September	Hideyoshi Toyotomi dies
1598	19 October	Siege of Suncheon: Allied forces lay siege to Suncheon
1598	October	Second Siege of Ulsan: Allied forces lay siege to Ulsan
1598	2 November	Second Siege of Ulsan: Allied forces retreat from Ulsan
1598	2 November	Siege of Suncheon: Allied forces retreat from Suncheon
1598	6 November	Battle of Sacheon (1598): Allied forces lay siege to Sacheon
1598	11 November	Battle of Sacheon (1598): Allied forces are forced to retreat from Sacheon
1598	16 December	Battle of Noryang: The Japanese fleet is defeated by Yi Sun-sin
1598	24 December	The last Japanese ships leave Korea

== See also ==
- List of battles during the Japanese invasions of Korea (1592–1598)
- List of naval battles during the Japanese invasions of Korea (1592–1598)
- Military history of Korea
- Naval history of Korea
- Military history of Japan
- Military history of China (pre-1911)

== Bibliography ==
- Alagappa, Muthiah (2003), Asian Security Order: Instrumental and Normative Features, Stanford University Press, ISBN 0-8047-4629-X
- Arano, Yasunori (2005), The Formation of a Japanocentric World Order, International Journal of Asian Studies
- Brown, Delmer M. (May 1948), "The Impact of Firearms on Japanese Warfare, 1543–1598", The Far Eastern Quarterly, 7 (3), Association for Asian Studies: 236–53, doi:10.2307/2048846, JSTOR 2048846, S2CID 162924328
- Eikenberry, Karl W. (1988), "The Imjin War", Military Review, 68 (2): 74–82
- Ha, Tae-hung; Sohn, Pow-key (1977), 'Nanjung Ilgi: War Diary of Admiral Yi Sun-sin, Yonsei University Press, ISBN 89-7141-018-3
- Haboush, JaHyun Kim (2016), The Great East Asian War and the Birth of the Korean Nation
- Hawley, Samuel (2005), The Imjin War, The Royal Asiatic Society, Korea Branch/UC Berkeley Press, ISBN 89-954424-2-5
- Jang, Pyun-soon (1998), Noon-eu-ro Bo-nen Han-gook-yauk-sa 5: Gor-yeo Si-dae (눈으로 보는 한국역사 5: 고려시대), Park Doo-ui, Bae Keum-ram, Yi Sang-mi, Kim Ho-hyun, Kim Pyung-sook, et al., Joog-ang Gyo-yook-yaun-goo-won. 1998-10-30. Seoul, Korea.
- Kim, Ki-chung (Fall 1999), "Resistance, Abduction, and Survival: The Documentary Literature of the Imjin War (1592–8)", Korean Culture, 20 (3): 20–29
- Kim, Yung-sik (1998), "Problems and Possibilities in the Study of the History of Korean Science", Osiris, 2nd Series, 13: 48–79, doi:10.1086/649280, JSTOR 301878, S2CID 143724260
- 桑田忠親 [Kuwata, Tadachika], ed., 舊參謀本部編纂, [Kyu Sanbo Honbu], 朝鮮の役 [Chousen no Eki] (日本の戰史 [Nihon no Senshi] Vol. 5), 1965.
- Neves, Jaime Ramalhete (1994), "The Portuguese in the Im-Jim War?", Review of Culture, 18: 20–24
- Niderost, Eric (June 2001), "Turtleboat Destiny: The Imjin War and Yi Sun Shin", Military Heritage, 2 (6): 50–59, 89
- Niderost, Eric (January 2002), "The Miracle at Myongnyang, 1597", Osprey Military Journal, 4 (1): 44–50
- Park, Yune-hee (1973), Admiral Yi Sun-shin and His Turtleboat Armada: A Comprehensive Account of the Resistance of Korea to the 16th Century Japanese Invasion, Shinsaeng Press
- Rockstein, Edward D. (1993), Strategic And Operational Aspects of Japan's Invasions of Korea 1592–1598 1993-6-18, Naval War College
- Sadler, A. L. (June 1937), "The Naval Campaign in the Korean War of Hideyoshi (1592–1598)", Transactions of the Asiatic Society of Japan, Second Series, 14: 179–208
- Sansom, George (1961), A History of Japan 1334–1615, Stanford University Press, ISBN 0-8047-0525-9
- Sohn, Pow-key (April–June 1959), "Early Korean Painting", Journal of the American Oriental Society, 79 (2): 96–103, doi:10.2307/595851, JSTOR 595851
- Stramigioli, Giuliana (December 1954), "Hideyoshi's Expansionist Policy on the Asiatic Mainland", Transactions of the Asiatic Society of Japan, Third Series, 3: 74–116
- Strauss, Barry (Summer 2005), "Korea's Legendary Admiral", MHQ: The Quarterly Journal of Military History, 17 (4): 52–61
- Swope, Kenneth M. (2006), "Beyond Turtleboats: Siege Accounts from Hideyoshi's Second Invasion of Korea, 1597–1598", Sungkyun Journal of East Asian Studies, 6 (2), Academy of East Asian Studies: 177–206
- Swope, Kenneth M. (2005), "Crouching Tigers, Secret Weapons: Military Technology Employed During the Sino-Japanese-Korean War, 1592–1598", The Journal of Military History, 69: 11–42, doi:10.1353/jmh.2005.0059, S2CID 159829515
- Swope, Kenneth M. (December 2002), "Deceit, Disguise, and Dependence: China, Japan, and the Future of the Tributary System, 1592–1596", The International History Review, 24 (4): 757–1008, doi:10.1080/07075332.2002.9640980, S2CID 154827808
- Swope, Kenneth M. (2009), A Dragon's Head and a Serpent's Tail: Ming China and the First Great East Asian War, 1592–1598, University of Oklahoma Press
- Turnbull, Stephen (2002), Samurai Invasion: Japan's Korean War 1592–98, Cassell & Co, ISBN 0-304-35948-3
- Turnbull, Stephen (2008), The Samurai Invasion of Korea 1592-98, Osprey Publishing Ltd
- Turnbull, Stephen (1998), The Samurai Sourcebook, Cassell & Co, ISBN 1-85409-523-4
- Villiers, John (1980), SILK and Silver: Macau, Manila and Trade in the China Seas in the Sixteenth Century (PDF) (A lecture delivered to the Hong Kong Branch of the Royal Asiatic Society at the Hong Kong Club. 10 June 1980), The HKUL Digital Initiatives
- Yi, Min-woong (2004), Imjin Wae-ran Haejeonsa: The Naval Battles of the Imjin War [임진왜란 해전사], Chongoram Media [청어람미디어], ISBN 89-89722-49-7
