= List of battles during the Imjin War =

There were many recorded and unrecorded battles during the Imjin War. The major battles include:

- 1592
  - Siege of Busan
  - Battle of Tadaejin
  - Siege of Tongnae
  - Battle of Sangju
  - Battle of Chungju
  - Hamgyong campaign – Also known as Kato's Northern Campaign
  - Battle of Okpo – First major naval battle between the invading Japanese fleet and Korea
  - Battle of Sacheon – First naval battle to utilize Turtle ships
  - Battle of Imjin River
  - Battle of Dangpo – Naval battle
  - Danghangpo Battle (1592) – Naval battle
  - Battle of Hansando – Naval battle
  - Siege of Pyeongyang – The city was sieged twice in one year
  - Battle of Jeonju
  - Battle of Chongju
  - Battle of Busan – Naval battle
  - Siege of Jinju – First siege of Jinju
  - Battle of Yongin - Major Japanese Victory over Joseon Efforts to retake Hanseong
- 1593
  - Siege of Pyeongyang
  - Battle of Byeokjegwan
  - Siege of Haengju
  - Siege of Jinju – The second siege on Jinju castle (Japanese victory)
  - Battle of Haejeongchang – Part of the Hamgyong campaign
  - Danghangpo Battle (1593) – Naval battle
- 1597
  - Battle of Chilchonryang – Naval battle
  - Siege of Namwon
  - Battle of Jiksan
  - Battle of Myeongnyang – Naval battle
  - Siege of Ulsan – First siege of Ulsan
  - Battle of Hwawangsan
- 1598
  - Siege of Suncheon
  - Siege of Ulsan – Second siege of Ulsan
  - Battle of Sacheon – Land battle
  - Battle of Noryang Point – Final naval battle

== See also ==
- Timeline of the Japanese invasions of Korea (1592–1598)
- List of naval battles during the Japanese invasions of Korea (1592–1598)
- History of Korea
- Military history of Korea
- Military history of Japan
