= Qian Shizhen =

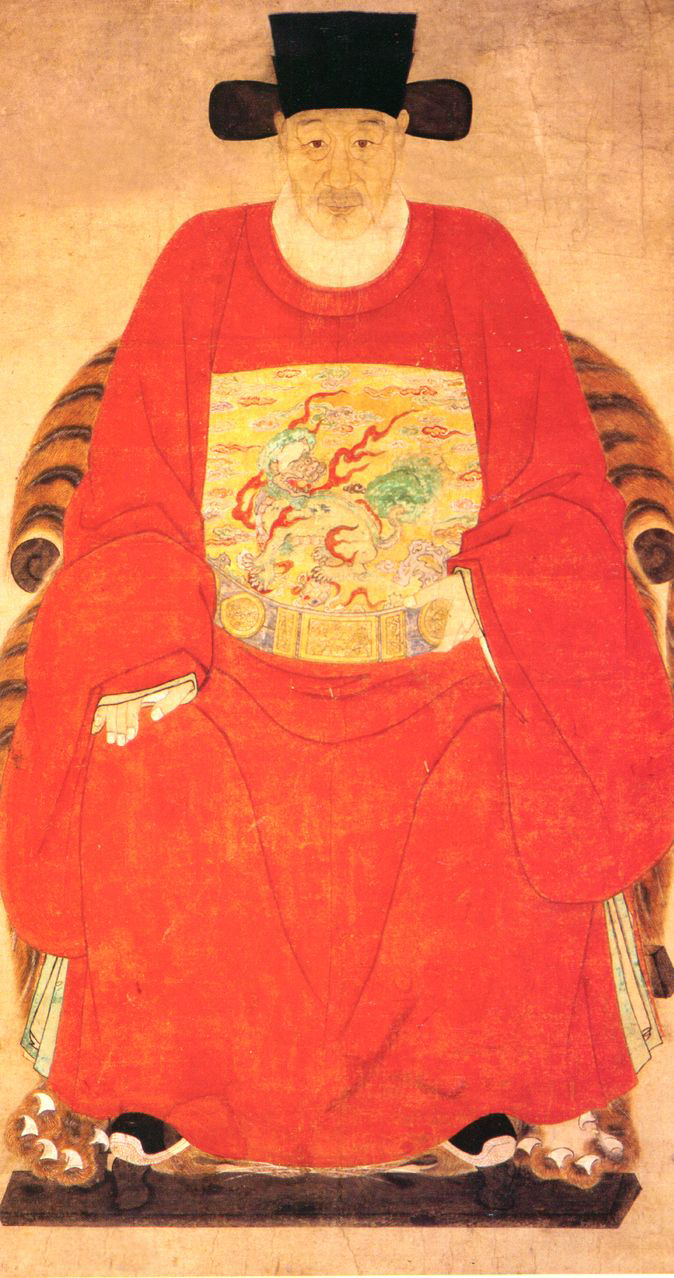
Qian Shizhen

Qian Shizhen (Chinese: 錢世楨; 1561–1642) was a Ming dynasty general who participated in the Imjin War. His chosen name is Zhisun, and his nickname was Sanqi. He was the author of "The records of the Eastern Expedition (征東實紀)" and "Comments on archery" (射評).

== Early life ==
Qian was born in what is today Shanghai city, the son of a scholar. His father was able to pass several levels in the Ming dynasty Imperial exam, but only served briefly as an administrator before continuing life as a free scholar back home.

Qian was said to have been a brilliant child, with a strong grasp of literature at an early age, yet he also showed strong interest and an uncanny ability for martial skills.

Qian officially decided to pursue the path of a military career instead of an academic one at age 21, (a rather uncommon choice by the standards of the day) and succeeded in passing the military version of the imperial exam in 1589.

By 1592, just prior to the Imjin War, he was a minor officer in charge of 500 men as part of the logistical corp along the Grand Canal.

== Imjin War ==
Qian was promoted to a low ranking general as a result of the Imjin War, and after he arrived at Beijing on his latest logistical run along the Grand Canal he quickly took 1,000 men to Liaodong. Upon arriving at Liaodong, he learned of his mother's death back home, but choose to hide the information from others so he could continue to participate in the war.

Qian along with Wu Weizhong was part of the vanguard of the major Ming expedition in 1593 directed by Song Yingchang and led by Li Rusong.

According to Qian's records, on 1/1 1593 he encountered a small scouting party of Japanese and killed its leader in the ensuing skirmish. In the following days, he was part of the forces that retook Pyongyang from the Japanese forces under Konishi Yukinaga. Qian's records complained that although Li Rusong commanded the Ming army to not take any heads during the battle, he realized after the battle that Li's own men and the Northern troops closer to him had basically ignored the order.

Qian noted that by then the Korean logistics were already lagging behind the Ming forces, and only until nearly a week later did the grain shipments finally arrive in sufficient number for the Ming forces to continue forward.

Qian was part of the forces that retook Kaesong on the 19th. During this time he met a small group of Japanese forces, whose opposing commander challenged him to a duel. Qian accepted the challenge and killed the samurai, but afterwards he was denied of the claim because he did not know the name of his foe.

His records also stated that the general Zha Dashou (查大受) was responsible for misleading Li Rusong and the Ming forces to the debacle in the battle of Byeokjegwan in late January that year. After the battle of Byeokjegwan, the Ming army stalled; disease and grudges between the generals of different origins also contributed to the problem.

After peace talks began, Qian was sent to escort the Japanese delegation group. He recorded that they went hunting around Busan (where Qian captured a large feral horse) along with other daily conversations and interactions.

Qian returned to China along with the main Ming host in September 1593.

== Later life ==
Qian began to rise quickly after returning from Korea, eventually topping out as the Zhongbin (highest level of generals in the Ming) in 1620, but he retired before officially taking office.

He was a close friend with the famous Ming politician Xu Guangqi.

Qian died in 1642, just two years before the collapse of the Ming dynasty. His son was also a military officer in the Ming.

== Sources ==
- Famous Qian figure biographies
- The records of JianDing county (嘉定縣誌人物傳)
- Qian Shizhen; "The records of the eastern expedition" (征東實紀 錢世楨 著)
