= Siege of Pyongyang =

The Battle or Siege of Pyongyang may refer to:

- Siege of Wanggeom-seong (108 BC), fought during the Han conquest of Gojoseon
- Siege of Pyongyang (371), fought during the Goguryeo–Baekje War of 371
- Siege of Pyongyang (668), fought during the Goguryeo–Tang War
- Siege of Pyongyang (1592), fought during the Japanese invasions of Korea
- Battle of Pyongyang (1592), fought during the Japanese invasions of Korea
- Siege of Pyongyang (1593), fought during the Japanese invasions of Korea
- Battle of Pyongyang (1894), fought during the First Sino-Japanese War
- Battle of Pyongyang (1950), fought during the Korean War
