= Ordos campaign (1592) =

Rebellion against Ming China

Date	March – October 1592
Location	Ningxia
Result	Ming victory

Belligerents
Rebels in Ningxia	Ming dynasty

Commanders and leaders
Liu Dongyang; Pubei; Bo Cheng'en; Xu Chao; Tu Wenxiu	Wei Xueceng; Ye Mengxiong; Li Rusong; Mei Guozhen; Ma Gui; Xiao Ruxun; Dong Yiyuan

Strength
20,000 or 30,000	40,000; 400 cannons

The Ordos campaign of 1592 (Note: Also called the Ningxia campaign (寧夏之役), Ningxia mutiny (寧夏兵變), or Pubei rebellion (哱拜之亂)) was a rebellion of the garrison in Ningxia against their regional commanders. It took place in March 1592 in Ningxia, which was one of the nine military regions on the border of Ming China with Mongolia. The Chinese officer Liu Dongyang and Mongol general Pubei successfully overthrew the Ming generals in Ningxia and took control of the city and its surrounding fortifications. The Ming army, led by Wei Xueceng, quickly regained control of the region and laid siege to Ningxia in mid-May. The rebels had a sizable force of 20,000–30,000 soldiers, while Ningxia's population was 300,000. The Ming government gathered 40,000 soldiers, armed with hundreds of cannons, to suppress the rebellion. The siege lasted for several months, with neither side gaining the upper hand. The rebels attempted to gain support from the Mongol khans, but were unsuccessful. The stalemate was broken when the Ming army built a dam around the city, which, when filled with water, flooded the city and destroyed its castles. The defenders' morale was further weakened by a lack of food. On 20 October 1592, the city was finally captured and the rebel leaders were either killed or captured and executed.

== Background ==
After the settlement of relations between Ming China and the Mongol Altan Khan in 1571, and the resumption of Sino-Mongol trade, the Ming state's interactions with its northern neighbors were generally peaceful. The Ming did not see the Mongols as a serious threat, although there were occasional armed clashes, sometimes involving tens of thousands of men. With authorization from the Wanli Emperor (r. 1572–1620) and chief minister Zhang Juzheng, Ming troops also conducted raids into Mongolia and Manchuria, burning settlements, killing rebellious leaders, and seizing livestock. In 1591, Li Chengliang destroyed a Mongol camp during a raid, resulting in the deaths of 280 Mongols and the scattering of over a thousand. Despite the active defense of the empire's borders and military support from the Emperor and Zhang Juzheng, the Ming armies guarding the northwest border were in mediocre condition. Several minor rebellions occurred in the 1580s, mostly due to delays in the payment of wages and food.

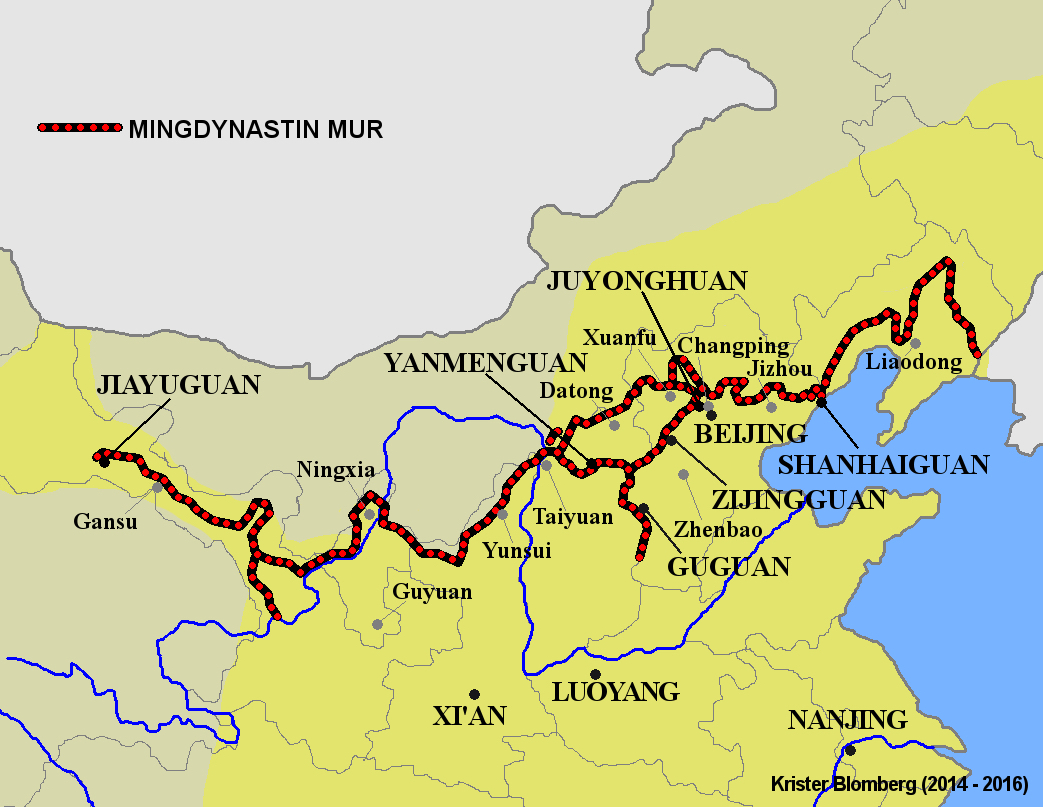
Map of the Ming Great Wall. The gray dots on the map indicate the locations of the military garrisons, including Ningxia Garrison.

At the end of the Jiajing Emperor's reign (1521–1567), Pubei (哱拜), a Mongol chieftain from Chahar, defected to the Chinese side with several hundred men from his household. His clan in Chahar had caused unrest by constantly raiding their neighbors, leading to the execution of Pubei's father and older brother by the chieftain of their tribe. Pubei then fled to Ming territory. Known for their exceptional skills in warfare, he and his horsemen were able to cover 150–200 km (90–125 mi) on horseback in a day, ambush and disperse enemy camps, and plunder cattle. The Mongols feared Pubei and did not dare to attack Ming villages within a 150 km (93 mi) radius of Ningxia. Within ten years, the Ming court appointed him as regional military commissioner of Huamachi, a strategically important fortress in the northwestern borderlands southeast of Ningxia. Pubei played a significant role in Ming raids against Mongol chieftains in and around Ordos. Despite some complaints from officials, he was highly respected and honored by both Zhang Juzheng and the Wanli Emperor. In 1589, he was appointed regional vice commander of Ningxia, with his son Bo Cheng'en taking over his previous position. Pubei had a personal guard of 3,000 men at his disposal, a common practice among senior late Ming commanders. However, being over 60 years old, Pubei wanted to cede his new position to his son. The grand coordinator in Ningxia, Dang Xin (党馨), protested, citing Pubei's power and potential danger.

Pubei and Bo Cheng'en entered into a years-long dispute with Dang Xin, who consistently denied providing equipment and supplies to Pubei's soldiers and even had Bo Cheng'en punished for kidnapping another officer's wife. Dang also arrested those who supported Pubei and Bo Cheng'en. Despite their complaints to Beijing, no resolution was reached. The soldiers and officers, left without resources, repeatedly protested and demanded payment for their services, as well as basic necessities such as food, clothing, and equipment. However, Dang refused to comply for a long time. In 1592, he finally paid them a year's salary, but he still owed them three years' worth of payment, so the situation did not improve significantly. In February of that year, the government received yet another complaint against Dang and decided to launch an investigation. Dang managed to manipulate the situation by having his relative, Shi Jifang (石繼芳), appointed as the investigator.

== Rebellion ==
In late March 1592, the soldiers and officers who were owed money by Dang Xin became increasingly frustrated with his refusal to pay their salaries. Led by Chinese officer Liu Dongyang (劉東暘), they rose up and killed Dang and Shi Jifang, and the military commander of the area was forced to commit suicide. Liu became their commander. Pubei served as chief strategist, and his son Bo Cheng'en and the experienced officer Xu Chao (許朝) were deputy commanders. Tu Wenxiu (土文秀), the son of one of Pubei's original Mongol loyalists, and Pubei's adopted son Bo Yun (継雲) served as the commander's assistants. The government believed that Pubei, due to his Mongol origins, was the mastermind behind the rebellion. The rebels successfully captured Ningxia and 47 surrounding forts, while the pro-government officers and their troops retreated in confusion. In an attempt to expand their control, Tu Wenxiu led 500 men to attack Pinglu, a city 200 km (120 mi) south of Ningxia, but the local Ming commander Xiao Ruxun (蕭如薰) defended Pinglu. In late April, several thousand Mongols, led by Jorightu, joined the rebels and were welcomed in Ningxia. On 9 May, they launched another unsuccessful attack on Pinglu. The Mongols then withdrew, plundering the countryside.

The rebels demanded recognition from the government, threatening to form an alliance with the Ordos Mongols. Ningxia was a heavily fortified city with a population of 300,000 and an armed rebel force of 30,000 (or possibly 20,000). (Note: In total, the regional commander of Ningxia had seven regiments and four battalions under his command, theoretically comprising 61,900 soldiers and 40,200 horses. The actual number was lower, for example, when the garrison of the city was checked in 1571, it was found that only 21,669 out of the 27,728 soldiers listed were present. (This was considered a relatively good result compared to the standards.)) The city walls were six meters thick and nine meters high, and the rebels were skilled and experienced soldiers.

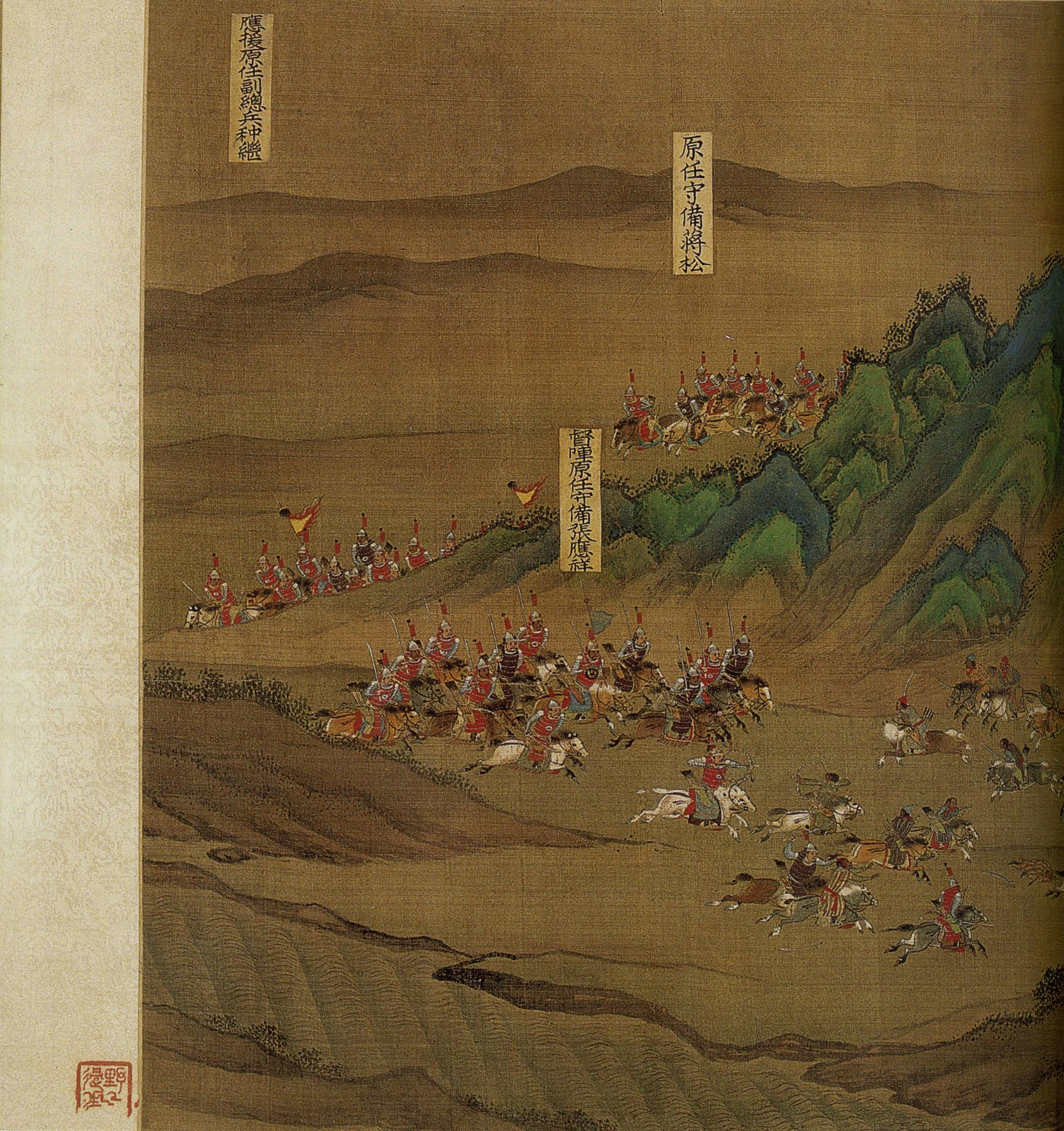
Ming cavalry, illustration from Pingfan desheng tu (平番得勝圖), depicting the campaign to pacify nomadic tribes in Northwest China during the early Wanli era

On 19 April, the Wanli Emperor was informed of the rebellion. He immediately summoned Minister of War Shi Xing (石星), upon whose suggestion he issued a decree to mobilize 7,000 soldiers from the garrisons in Xuanfu, Datong, and Shanxi. The Emperor also appointed several officers and officials to suppress the rebellion, including Ma Gui, a powerful general with his own guard. (Note: Ma Gui came from a military family serving in Datong, and his father Ma Lu (麻祿) and brother Ma Jin (麻錦) were also successful generals.) Additionally, Wei Xueceng (魏學曾), a scholar-official with military experience and commander-in-chief of the three border regions, was assigned to crush the rebellion. Wei acted swiftly and effectively, securing the south bank of the Yellow River, capturing key points, and recapturing the surrounding border fortresses within a few weeks. The only remaining stronghold for the rebels was the city of Ningxia. The rebels slowed the Ming army's progress by ambushing roads and destroying government supplies. However, after reclaiming the region, Wei declared that he did not have enough resources to take Ningxia and took a passive approach. Despite the Emperor and his advisors providing additional forces, Wei still insisted on a peaceful resolution, citing concerns for the safety of civilians in Ningxia. This decision was criticized by some officials in Beijing, particularly Mei Guozhen (梅國楨), a censor with a military background. After discussing the situation with the supervising secretaries of the ministries and then with the ministers and censors, the Emperor took a decisive stance, stating that the rebellion must be suppressed as quickly as possible.

Over the course of six weeks, the Ming forces laid siege to Ningxia while also facing occasional harassment from the Mongols. On 22 May, a group of one thousand rebels, led by Pubei's son Bo Chengchong (哱承寵), attempted to join forces with the Mongols. However, they were unable to reach their destination due to blocked roads and were forced to return to the city. The Ming's initial attack on 23 May was unsuccessful, and they tried again on 27 May, resulting in the deaths of approximately three thousand defenders, but the Ming's further attempt to break through the northern gate caused heavy casualties among their own troops. After receiving news of the Mongols' arrival, the Ming forces withdrew, but resumed their attacks after three days and began constructing ramparts around the city in preparation for a prolonged siege. On 1 June, the rebels joined forces with two thousand Mongol cavalry and launched an attack on the besiegers, but were repelled by artillery fire. In mid-June, Wei sent reinforcements to the passes north and east of the city, just in time for a group of 10,000 Mongols to appear 70 km (43 mi) north of Ningxia and another group of 2,000 to 3,000 to appear at Huamachi, southeast of the city. Wei's troops drove back the Mongols, but Wei felt that he did not have enough forces to both defend the border and launch a decisive attack on Ningxia. When bad weather set in, he withdrew his troops from the city to nearby forts, which boosted the rebels' morale. The rebels attempted to persuade the Mongols to join forces against the Ming, but Jorightu remained skeptical of their plans to conquer the province together.

After the outbreak of the war in Korea in May, the Emperor and government urged Wei to speed up the siege, but he continued to use delaying tactics. This caused criticism in Beijing, leading Mei Guozhen to suggest that Li Chengliang, the Count of Ningyuan, an experienced and respected veteran, be placed in charge of the counter-insurgency forces. Li Chengliang's sons Li Rusong, Li Rubai, and Li Ruzhen (李如楨) were also capable generals, while his other sons, Li Ruzhang (李如樟) and Li Rumei (李如梅), and his cousin Li Ruwu (李如梧) served in the army. The family held significant influence in the northeast of the empire, specifically in Liaodong. However, officials disliked the Lis due to their disregard for Confucian values and their association with Zhang Juzheng. Additionally, the position of military superintendent (tidu) was typically reserved for officials, and Li Chengliang was already retired and living in distant Liaodong. The officials viewed them as "wolves" who should not be trusted with such an important position. Despite this, the war party in the government supported Mei Guozhen. The Emperor ultimately appointed Li Chengliang as military superintendent and Mei Guozhen as his assistant with the title of army inspecting censor for Ningxia. However, Li Chengliang declined the assignment, citing his advanced age and the Japanese invasion of Korea, which was adjacent to Liaodong. His son Li Rusong was then given the positions of military superintendent of Ningxia and commander in Shaanxi.

In mid-July, Ming reinforcements led by censor Ye Mengxiong (葉夢熊) (Note: Ye Mengxiong had already predicted a possible war in the northwest due to unusual weather before the uprising. After its outbreak, he offered himself as a commander.) arrived at Ningxia. They brought with them four hundred cannons, "fire carts", and a thousand Miao warriors. The Ming army divided the besieging troops into five divisions, with each division assigned to one of the major gates, while Ma Gui commanded a mobile corps. Towards the end of July, a 40,000-strong Ming army in Ningxia launched an attack from all sides. However, the rebels were able to repel the attack, causing heavy losses for the Ming army. The following night, the rebels made a surprise attack through the north gate and clashed with Ma's cavalry. Both sides suffered significant casualties, but the Ming artillery was able to drive the rebels back. After witnessing the rebels' failure, the Mongols refused to support them with an attack from the rear. On 30 July, Li Rusong and Mei Guozhen arrived with reinforcements from Liaodong, Xuanfu, Datong, and Shanxi. They also brought a large amount of equipment and supplies, including 30,000 uniforms. Li took command and began attacking the city day and night in early August. The rebels struggled to defend themselves and resorted to executing hostages. As the situation worsened, civilians in Ningxia began to die from lack of food and disease. Some of the rebels started to lose their resolve. Even the Ming army was facing challenges due to a shortage of iron, wood, and skilled craftsmen needed to make and repair weapons.

The Japanese were attacking Korea, and the Emperor was disgusted by Wei Xueceng's pacifist stance. Wei tried to appease the Mongols with titles and bribes and sought to negotiate with the rebels. In late August, he was arrested and taken to Beijing. The Emperor then approved Shi Xing's plan to build ramparts around the city and flood the interior, including the city itself, with water from lakes and rivers located 15 km (9.3 mi) away. Wei was replaced by Ye Mengxiong, who had previously written the treatise on warfare Yunchou gangmu (運籌綱目) in 1562. In this treatise, he emphasized the importance of water in warfare. The Korean king fled to the northern border of his country at Uiju on the Yalu River and sought asylum in Ming Liaodong. The Wanli Emperor sent a relief expeditionary force of 3,000 soldiers to Korea. In late August 1592, the Japanese defeated the Ming force near Pyongyang.

In Ningxia, as of 23 August, a 5.3 km (3.3 mi) long dam encircled the city. The rebels' attempt to establish contact with the Mongols failed when the Ming captured and executed Pubei's adopted son, who served as his father's envoy, along with 29 soldiers. However, the rebels were able to secure an alliance with the Mongol chieftain Bushugtu. Li Rusong then sent Ma Gui and Dong Yiyuan (董一元) to attack Bushugtu, and they successfully occupied the passes east of the city. The Ming forces repelled the Mongols. On 6 September, the water level in the city reached almost three meters, and the rebels' boat attack on the rampart failed. Inside the city, rebel officers resorted to eating horses, and civilians were forced to eat tree bark. On 7 September, a section of the dam collapsed, resulting in the execution of the responsible officer. The rebels attempted another assault but were once again repelled. The city's residents demanded the rebels' surrender, and on 17 September, Ma also appealed to them to save lives. Despite this, the rebels made another attempt to break out on 22 September. On 25 September, 18,000 Mongols led by Jorightu were blocked north of the city. Li and Ma launched a counterattack and successfully drove the Mongols back. The morale of the rebels began to decline. On 12 October, the water breached the northern gate, and the Ming soldiers were able to overcome the southern walls. The Ming promised the rebel leaders clemency if they killed their accomplices. Before the fall of the city, Liu Dongyang killed Tu Wenxiu, while Bo Cheng'en killed Xu Chao and Liu Dongyang. The city was finally captured on 20 October 1592, and Pubei committed suicide. Bo Cheng'en surrendered and was executed, along with several other captured leaders.

== Aftermath ==
The Ming government promoted its commanders—Li Rusong was promoted to supreme commander, while Ye Mengxiong became censor in chief of the right. A large part of the troops from Ningxia was sent to Korea, including Li, who was appointed supreme commander of the Eastern Expedition to chastise the Japanese. After Li and Mei's intervention, Wei Xueceng was released from prison and died in obscurity. On the northwestern frontier, more border markets were opened during the 1590s, and the Mongol raids subsequently lost strength and intensity.
