= Battle of Yongin =

1592 battle of the Imjin War

- Part of Imjin War
Date	July 13–14, 1592 (Gregorian Calendar); June 5–6, 1592 (Lunar calendar)
Location	Yongin, Joseon
Result	Japanese victory

Belligerents
Toyotomi Japan	Joseon

Commanders and leaders
Wakisaka Yasuharu; Wakizaka Sabei; Watanabe Shichi'emon; Manabe Samanosuke	Yi Gwang; Kwak Young; Yun Sun-gak; Kim Su; Gwon Yul; Baek Gwang-eon †; Lee Ji-Si †; Lee Ji-rye †; Hwang Jin

Strength
1,600~1,900	60,000

Casualties and losses
Unknown	1,200

- Korean name
- Hangul: 용인 전투
- Hanja: 龍仁戰鬪
- RR: Yongin jeontu
- MR: Yongin chŏnt'u

The Battle of Yongin (Korean: 용인 전투) happened during the Japanese invasions of Korea. The battle was fought from June 5–6, 1592 (Gregorian July 13–14, 1592). Yi Gwang's force of 60,000 lost to the numerically inferior Japanese garrison of 1,600-1,900.

== Background ==
In 1592, Toyotomi Hideyoshi invaded Korea, intending to use it as a route to send his armies to conquer Ming China. His forces achieved early success against the Korean army, capturing Seoul. Attempting to reach Seoul as fast as possible, the Japanese forces bypassed Jeolla Province. The governor of Jeolla, Yi Gwang, decided to lead his forces against the Japanese in a counterattack.

Yongin was a Japanese communication fortress, near Suwon. It was held by the daimyo Wakisaka Yasuharu. Yi Gwang led a force of 60,000 against it.

== Course of battle ==
Against Kwon Yul's warnings and advice, Yi Kwang launched an attack without making a reconnaissance. One group of the Korean army took up positions on a hill, while the other attacked the fortress itself. Wakisaka's forces counterattacked, and destroyed the Korean army through an ambush.

== Result ==
Many of the Korean officers were captured by the Japanese in the battle. Nevertheless, Gwon Yul and Hwang Jin retreated in good order and were able to gather surviving scattered troops for the victory at the Battle of Ichi. Thus, Jeolla remained outside Japanese control for the rest of the first Japanese invasion of Korea.

On the other hand, the defeat of Yongin (along with the defeat at the Imjin River) convinced King Seonjo to abandon Pyeongyang and evacuate to Uiju. Historian Kim Haboush describes the destruction of the Joseon relief force at Yongin as one that dashed any hopes of Joseon regaining the initiative and bringing a quick conclusion to the war.

Although the Korean troops would eventually retake Seoul after winning a decisive victory at Hangju in 1593, the Koreans would never field an army of 60,000 at one point for the remaining of the war.

== In popular culture ==
The battle is repeatedly referenced in the 2022 film Hansan: Rising Dragon directed by Kim Han-min. In the movie, Japanese Commander Wakisaka Yasuharu is considered a formidable foe by Korean commanders due to his stunning victory over the numerically superior Joseon forces at Yongin.
