= Ordos campaign =

Ordos Campaign may refer to:

- Qin's campaign against the Xiongnu (215 BC), or Meng Tian's Ordos campaign
- Han–Xiongnu War, which involved several campaigns in the Ordos region
- Ordos campaign (1592), during the Ming dynasty
