= Battle of Pyongyang (1592) =

Battle in the Japanese invasion of Korea

Coordinates: 39°02′9.52″N 125°45′15.36″E

- Part of the Japanese invasions of Korea (1592–1598)
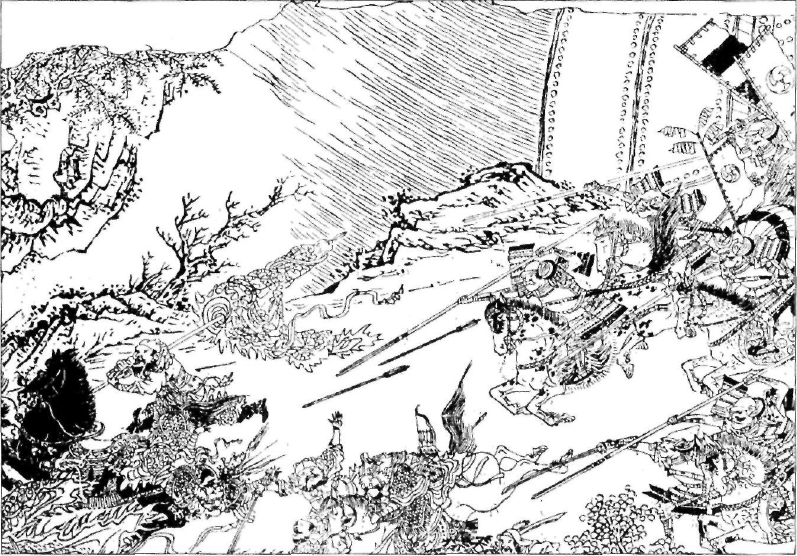
- Battle of Pyongyang (1592): The Japanese army repelling the Ming Dynasty's mercenaries
Date	23 August 1592
Location	Pyongyang
Result	Japanese victory

Belligerents
Toyotomi Japan	Ming dynasty China

Commanders and leaders
Konishi Yukinaga	Zu Chengxun; Shi Ru †

Strength
20,000	3,000–6,000

Casualties and losses
?	3,000

The Battle of Pyongyang was a military engagement in 1592, as part of the 1592–1598 Japanese invasions of Korea. On 23 August 1592 a Ming force of 6,000 under Zu Chengxun and Shi Ru attacked Japanese-occupied Pyeongyang and was defeated.

== Background ==
Following the capture of Pyongyang by the Japanese army led by Konishi Yukinaga, Korean King Seonjo retreated to Yongbyon and thence to Uiju near the border with China. King Seonjo was dissuaded by his advisors from seeking asylum in China, but redoubled his efforts to solicit military assistance. The Chinese were slow to respond, as their military was largely occupied in the Ordos campaign suppressing a mutiny and uprising by the Mongol minority.

On 23 July 1592, Shi Ru led 1,029 men into Joseon as the vanguard of Zu Chengxun, the vice commander of Liaoyang. They served as the bodyguard of King Seonjo. Later a second force of 1,319 men under Zu arrived to reinforce. In total some 3,000 men were dispatched. Others put the number at 5,000-6,000. The Koreans were disappointed at the small number of men that had been sent but Zu believed that they could defeat the Japanese in one decisive battle.

Meanwhile, Konishi Yukinaga's plans to advance north of Pyongyang were stalled due to need of reinforcements and supplies. The promised materials were to have been sent by ships via the west coast of Korea, but due to Korean Admiral Yi Sun-sin's string of victories in the Yellow Sea, most of the Japanese transports had been sunk. Only a trickle of men and supplies was reaching Pyongyang via the long overland route, and other Japanese commanders were facing similar difficulties and were unable to provide him with any assistance.

== Battle ==
The combined army of Zu Chengxun and Shi Ru arrived at Pyeongyang on 23 August 1592 in a pouring rain at night. The Japanese were caught completely off guard and the Ming army was able to take the undefended Chilsongmun ("Seven Stars Gate") in the north wall and entered the city. However the Japanese soon realized just how tiny the Ming army actually was, so they spread out, causing the enemy army to stretch out and disperse. The Japanese then took advantage of the situation and counterattacked with gunfire. The Ming horses could not maneuver in the narrow and muddy streets and were shot to death. Small groups of isolated Ming soldiers were picked off until the signal to retreat was sounded. The Ming army had been turned around, driven out of the city, its stragglers cut down. By the end of the day, Shi Ru was killed while Zu Chengxun escaped back to Uiju. Some 3,000 Ming soldiers were killed.

== Aftermath ==
Zu Chengxun attempted to downplay the defeat, advising King Seonjo that he had only made a "tactical retreat" due to the weather, and would return from China after raising more troops. However, upon his return to Liaodong, he wrote an official report blaming the Koreans for the defeat. Ming envoys sent to Korea found this accusation groundless.

Realizing that the attack by Zu Chengxun was only the start of Ming involvement in the conflict, Konishi Yukinaga traveled south to Hanseong on 12 September to discuss plans for a defense in depth with Ukita Hideie, which would enable him to make a controlled withdrawal from Pyongyang if faced with overwhelming odds in the future.

Zu Chengxun's defeat caused a heated debate in Beijing, where the government had finally awoken to the potential threat to the empire should the Japanese complete their conquest of Korea. On 6 October 1592, the Wanli Emperor issued an edict to King Seonjo stating his support in defeating the Japanese.

== See also ==
- List of battles during the Japanese invasions of Korea (1592-1598)
- Timeline of the Japanese invasions of Korea

== Bibliography ==
- Chase, Kenneth (2003), Firearms: A Global History to 1700, Cambridge University Press, ISBN 978-0-521-82274-9.
- Hawley, Samuel (2005), The Imjin War, The Royal Asiatic Society, Korea Branch/UC Berkeley Press, ISBN 978-89-954424-2-5
- Swope, Kenneth M. (2006), "Beyond Turtleboats: Siege Accounts from Hideyoshi's Second Invasion of Korea, 1597–1598", Sungkyun Journal of East Asian Studies, 6 (2): 177–206
- Swope, Kenneth M. (2005), "Crouching Tigers, Secret Weapons: Military Technology Employed During the Sino-Japanese-Korean War, 1592–1598", The Journal of Military History, 69: 11–42, doi:10.1353/jmh.2005.0059, S2CID 159829515
- Swope, Kenneth M. (December 2002), "Deceit, Disguise, and Dependence: China, Japan, and the Future of the Tributary System, 1592–1596", The International History Review, 24 (4): 757–1008, doi:10.1080/07075332.2002.9640980, S2CID 154827808
- Swope, Kenneth M. (2009), A Dragon's Head and a Serpent's Tail: Ming China and the First Great East Asian War, 1592–1598, University of Oklahoma Press
- Turnbull, Stephen (2002), Samurai Invasion: Japan's Korean War 1592–98, Cassell & Co, ISBN 978-0-304-35948-6
- Turnbull, Stephen (2008), The Samurai Invasion of Korea 1592-98, Osprey Publishing Ltd
- Turnbull, Stephen (1998), The Samurai Sourcebook, Cassell & Co, ISBN 978-1-85409-523-7
