= Siege of Pyongyang (1593) =

Fought during the Japanese invasions of Korea in 1593

- Part of the Japanese invasions of Korea (1592-1598)
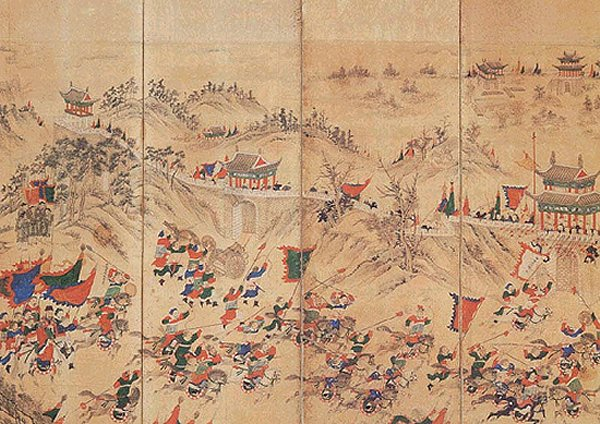
- Chinese cavalry and infantry attacking the walls of Pyongyang in 1593, from a Chinese painted screen in the Hizen-Nagoya castle museum
Date	6–8 February 1593
Location	Pyongyang
Result	Ming China-Joseon victory: Japanese retreat from Pyeongyang

Belligerents
Japan	Ming dynasty Joseon

Commanders and leaders
Konishi Yukinaga; Matsuura Shigenobu; Sō Yoshitoshi	Ming; Li Rusong; Li Rubai; Song Yingchang; Zhang Shijue; Yang Yuan; Zu Chengxun; Wu Weizhong; Luo Shangzhi; Zha Dashou; Joseon; Yi Il; Hyujeong; Gim Eungso

Strength
15,000–30,000	Ming; 43,000; 200+ cannons 34237 Joseon; 10,000; 4,200 monks

Casualties and losses
1,300–1,700 killed in combat 5,000 died from fires 6,000 drowned	Ming; 796 killed 1,492 wounded Joseon; 600+

The siege of Pyongyang was a military conflict fought between the allied Ming-Joseon army and the Japanese First Division under Konishi Yukinaga, who were besieged in the city of Pyongyang. The battle ended in victory for the allies although remnants of the Japanese forces successfully escaped from the city in the night of 8 February 1593.

== Background ==
In July 1592, the Japanese forces under daimyo Konishi Yukinagal captured Pyongyang and garrisoned his force the city. In August of that year, the garrison successfully repulsed a small force of Ming soldiers.

A minor Ming force of 5,000 under Wu Weizhong arrived at the Yalu River on 5 January.

The Ming army of 35,000 under Li Rusong arrived at the Yalu River on 26 January. They were then joined by the advance force and a bodyguard unit sent to protect Seonjo of Joseon, raising their strength to 43,000, another 10,000 Koreans at Sunan under Yi Il, and finally 4,200 monks under Hyujeong.

Li Rusong sent ahead the envoy Shen Weijing to negotiate with Konishi Yukinaga, however this act was insincere. He had no intention of negotiating with the Japanese. Konishi sent 20 men to greet the Ming envoys, but most of them did not return. It's not certain what happened to them. One version of events state that they were killed during a banquet with Shen Weijing, another says they were simply ambushed on the way. According to one account, the Ming army set up a banquet to entertain 23 Japanese soldiers. At the banquet, the Ming army launched an attack, killing 15 Japanese soldiers, capturing 3, and 5 escaped.

During the march to Pyeongyang they encountered a Japanese scout party, three of whom were captured, and five killed. The allied army arrived at Pyeongyang and set up camp north of the city on 5 February 1593.

Konishi offered to hold negotiations but was refused. That night some 800 Japanese sneaked out and attacked the Ming camp, however they were spotted by guards and driven back by fire arrows, suffering 30 casualties.

== Battle ==
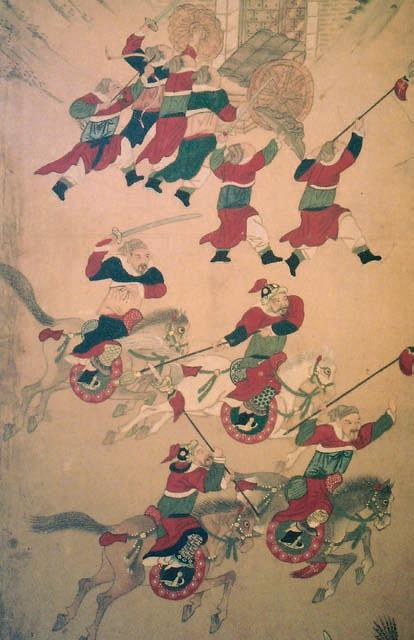
Ming cavalry and infantry attack the walls of Pyeongyang.

The battle began on 5 February 1593. Hyujeong's monks with support from Wu Weizhong attacked the large hill north of Pyeongyang where around 2,000 enemy troops were stationed under Konishi Yukinaga. Konishi was almost surrounded at one point until Sō Yoshitoshi counterattacked and rescued him. The fighting lasted for two days before the last Japanese commander, Matsuura Shigenobu, was forced to pull back to Pyeongyang. The monks suffered 600 casualties and Wu Weizhong was wounded in the chest by a bullet.

In the morning of 8 February, Li Rusong's army advanced on the city, their tightly packed ranks "looking like the scales on a fish”. Yang Yuan and Zhang Shijue attacked from the north and west, Li Rubai from the southeast, and Yi Il and Gim Eungso from the southwest. The east was covered by the Daedong River and could not be attacked.

Once the signal cannon fired, they rushed the walls with ladders, shot fire arrows and threw bombs into the city, and started pounding the gates with cannons. The Japanese defense was almost too much. Li Rusong's own horse was shot out from under him and the assault began to show signs of faltering before Li went forward, cut off the head of a retreating soldier, and offered 5,000 taels to the first man over the wall. The allied troops renewed their assault until Luo Shangzhi was able to clear the wall and Yang Yuan followed by breaking through the northern gate. In the west the surviving monks and troops from the earlier attack joined Zhang Shijue's push into the city once the gate had been destroyed by cannons.

The Japanese pulled back to their last line of defense, an earth and log fort in the northern corner of Pyeongyang. Li Rusong instructed his troops to set the building on fire using fire arrows but the Japanese could not be dislodged. Instead the crush of allied soldiers and cavalry suffered horrendous casualties to Japanese gunfire. Unable to move forward, many retreated through the western gate. Seeing this, Konishi chose to go on the offensive and sortied out with his men, only to be driven back by cannon fire.

Unwilling to suffer any more casualties, Li Rusong called off the attack as night approached.

Although nominally successful in repelling the enemies, the Japanese were no longer capable of defending the city. All the gates had been breached, no food was left, and they had suffered horrible casualties. With this in mind Konishi led the entire garrison out into the night and snuck across the frozen Daedong River back to Hanseong. Many drowned during the crossing.

A samurai, Yoshino Jingoze'emon, wrote about the retreat:

There was hardly a gap between the dead bodies that filled the surroundings of Matsuyama Castle [Moranbong]. Finally, when we had repulsed the enemy, they burned the food storehouses in several places, so there was now no food. On the night of the seventh day, we evacuated the caste, and made our escape. Wounded men were abandoned, while those who were not wounded but simply exhausted crawled almost prostrate along the road...Because it is a cold country, there is ice and deep snow, and hands and feet are burned by the snow, and this gives rise to frostbite, which makes them swell up. The only clothes they had were the garments worn under their armour, and even men who were normally gallant resembled scarecrows on the mountains and fields because of their fatigue, and were indistinguishable from the dead.

== Aftermath ==
The retreating Japanese soldiers were accosted by frostbite, snow-blindness, and starvation. Aside from natural hardships, an ambush by Zha Dashou and Li Ning also claimed another 362 Japanese lives. Konishi's men reached Hanseong on 17 February.

After the Japanese loss at Pyeongyang, Kuroda Yoshitaka called for the removal of Konishi Yukinaga, saying that he was a poor leader and did not get along with his fellow commanders. Konishi, in turn, became the primary advocate for peace on the Japanese side, having suffered one of the heaviest losses during the campaign.

Song Yingchang invited Seonjo of Joseon to return to Pyeongyang on 6 March.

== See also ==
- List of battles during the Japanese invasions of Korea (1592–1598)
- Siege of Pyongyang (1592)

== Bibliography ==
- Alagappa, Muthiah (2003), Asian Security Order: Instrumental and Normative Features, Stanford University Press, ISBN 978-0-8047-4629-8
- Arano, Yasunori (2005), The Formation of a Japanocentric World Order, International Journal of Asian Studies
- Brown, Delmer M. (May 1948), "The Impact of Firearms on Japanese Warfare, 1543–1598", The Far Eastern Quarterly, 7 (3): 236–53, doi:10.2307/2048846, JSTOR 2048846, S2CID 162924328
- Eikenberry, Karl W. (1988), "The Imjin War", Military Review, 68 (2): 74–82
- Ha, Tae-hung; Sohn, Pow-key (1977), 'Nanjung Ilgi: War Diary of Admiral Yi Sun-sin, Yonsei University Press, ISBN 978-89-7141-018-9
- Haboush, JaHyun Kim (2016), The Great East Asian War and the Birth of the Korean Nation
- Hawley, Samuel (2005), The Imjin War, The Royal Asiatic Society, Korea Branch/UC Berkeley Press, ISBN 978-89-954424-2-5
- Jang, Pyun-soon (1998), Noon-eu-ro Bo-nen Han-gook-yauk-sa 5: Gor-yeo Si-dae (눈으로 보는 한국역사 5: 고려시대), Park Doo-ui, Bae Keum-ram, Yi Sang-mi, Kim Ho-hyun, Kim Pyung-sook, et al., Joog-ang Gyo-yook-yaun-goo-won. 1998-10-30. Seoul, Korea.
- Kim, Ki-chung (Fall 1999), "Resistance, Abduction, and Survival: The Documentary Literature of the Imjin War (1592–8)", Korean Culture, 20 (3): 20–29
- Kim, Yung-sik (1998), "Problems and Possibilities in the Study of the History of Korean Science", Osiris, 2nd Series, 13: 48–79, doi:10.1086/649280, JSTOR 301878, S2CID 143724260
- 桑田忠親 [Kuwata, Tadachika], ed., 舊參謀本部編纂, [Kyu Sanbo Honbu], 朝鮮の役 [Chousen no Eki] (日本の戰史 [Nihon no Senshi] Vol. 5), 1965.
- Neves, Jaime Ramalhete (1994), "The Portuguese in the Im-Jim War?", Review of Culture, 18: 20–24
- Niderost, Eric (June 2001), "Turtleboat Destiny: The Imjin War and Yi Sun Shin", Military Heritage, 2 (6): 50–59, 89
- Niderost, Eric (January 2002), "The Miracle at Myongnyang, 1597", Osprey Military Journal, 4 (1): 44–50
- Park, Yune-hee (1973), Admiral Yi Sun-shin and His Turtleboat Armada: A Comprehensive Account of the Resistance of Korea to the 16th Century Japanese Invasion, Shinsaeng Press
- Rockstein, Edward D. (1993), Strategic And Operational Aspects of Japan's Invasions of Korea 1592–1598 1993-6-18, Naval War College
- Sadler, A. L. (June 1937), "The Naval Campaign in the Korean War of Hideyoshi (1592–1598)", Transactions of the Asiatic Society of Japan, Second Series, 14: 179–208
- Sansom, George (1961), A History of Japan 1334–1615, Stanford University Press, ISBN 978-0-8047-0525-7
- Sohn, Pow-key (April–June 1959), "Early Korean Painting", Journal of the American Oriental Society, 79 (2): 96–103, doi:10.2307/595851, JSTOR 595851
- Stramigioli, Giuliana (December 1954), "Hideyoshi's Expansionist Policy on the Asiatic Mainland", Transactions of the Asiatic Society of Japan, Third Series, 3: 74–116
- Strauss, Barry (Summer 2005), "Korea's Legendary Admiral", MHQ: The Quarterly Journal of Military History, 17 (4): 52–61
- Swope, Kenneth M. (2006), "Beyond Turtleboats: Siege Accounts from Hideyoshi's Second Invasion of Korea, 1597–1598", Sungkyun Journal of East Asian Studies, 6 (2): 177–206
- Swope, Kenneth M. (2005), "Crouching Tigers, Secret Weapons: Military Technology Employed During the Sino-Japanese-Korean War, 1592–1598", The Journal of Military History, 69: 11–42, doi:10.1353/jmh.2005.0059, S2CID 159829515
- Swope, Kenneth M. (December 2002), "Deceit, Disguise, and Dependence: China, Japan, and the Future of the Tributary System, 1592–1596", The International History Review, 24 (4): 757–1008, doi:10.1080/07075332.2002.9640980, S2CID 154827808
- Swope, Kenneth M. (2009), A Dragon's Head and a Serpent's Tail: Ming China and the First Great East Asian War, 1592–1598, University of Oklahoma Press
- Turnbull, Stephen (2002), Samurai Invasion: Japan's Korean War 1592–98, Cassell & Co, ISBN 978-0-304-35948-6
- Turnbull, Stephen (2008), The Samurai Invasion of Korea 1592-98, Osprey Publishing Ltd
- Turnbull, Stephen (1998), The Samurai Sourcebook, Cassell & Co, ISBN 978-1-85409-523-7
- Villiers, John (1980), SILK and Silver: Macau, Manila and Trade in the China Seas in the Sixteenth Century (A lecture delivered to the Hong Kong Branch of the Royal Asiatic Society at the Hong Kong Club. 10 June 1980). The HKUL Digital Initiatives
- Yi, Min-woong (2004), Imjin Wae-ran Haejeonsa: The Naval Battles of the Imjin War [임진왜란 해전사], Chongoram Media [청어람미디어], ISBN 978-89-89722-49-6
