= Qian shi =

Qian shi may refer to:

- Euryale ferox (pinyin: qiàn shí), a plant in the Nymphaeaceae (water lily) family
- Qiàn shí, the Chinese name for Euryale ferox or fox nut
- Qin Shi Huang (259 BC–210 BC), founder of the Qin dynasty
- Qianshi hutong, a Beijing alleyway
- Qianshi Quantum Computer the 10 qubit Quantum Computer from Baidu.

== See also ==
- Qian Shizhen (1561–1642), Ming dynasty general
- Shi Qian (时迁), a character in the epic Chinese tale, the Water Margin
