= Kim Ung-so House =

Tourist attraction in North Korea

Coordinates: 38°50′15″N 125°20′52″E

- Hangul: 김응서집
- Hanja: 金應瑞집
- RR: Gim Eungseo jip
- MR: Kim Ŭngsŏ chip

The Kim Ung-so House is the residence of yangban Kim Ung-so, located in Ryonghung Village, Ryonggang County, North Korea. Until 2002, descendants of Ung-so still lived in the house; after that date, it was rebuilt on orders of Kim Jong-il. It is now a tourist attraction.

It is listed as a National Treasure of North Korea.
