= Sanggok Ma clan =

Korean clan from Chengde, China

- Country: Korea
- Current region: Chengde
- Founder: Ma Gui

The Sanggok Ma clan (Korean: 상곡 마씨; Hanja: 上谷 麻氏) is one of the Korean clans. Their Bon-gwan is in Chengde, China. According to the census held in 2015, the number of Sanggok Ma clan was 232. Their founder was Ma Gui who worked as general in Ming dynasty. He was dispatched as a member of troop during Japanese invasions of Korea (1592–98). He found Sanggok Ma clan because Ma Sun sang (Hanja: 麻舜裳), his great-grandchild, naturalized in Korea.

== See also ==
- Korean clan names of foreign origin
