= Wu Weizhong =

Wu Weizhong (Chinese: 吳惟忠) was a military commander for the Ming dynasty. He is from the county of Yiwu in Zhejiang province (浙江省 義烏縣), his chosen name is Ruchen and his nickname is Yunfeng (字汝誠，號雲峰) he was one of the Ming generals that fought in the Imjin War.

== Early career ==
Wu was first noted in the campaign of general Qi Jiguang against the Wako pirates in the 40th year of Jiajing Emperor in 1561. as a minor officer who fought valiantly. In 1568 he followed General Qi to his new station in the Northern garrison of Ji, and headed Qi's effort to reconstruct the Great Wall of China, in fact, much of the Great Wall we see today was contributed by Wu and other men under Qi.

In 1571, he was promoted to a low ranking general.

Wu continued Qi Jiguang's method of training soldiers, and his men were often regarded as the most capable fighting force of the Ming dynasty, especially when they were put to the test in 1592 during the Imjin War.

== Imjin War ==
In late 1592, the Ming dynasty decided to aid the Korean Joseon dynasty, who was being overran by the Japanese invasion ordered by Toyotomi Hideyoshi.

In their official relieve effort, Wu and his men were the first to cross the Yalu river and acted as the Ming army's vanguard along with the young general Qian Shizhen, at Pyongyang, he led his men to attack the northern section of Pyongyang and was wounded by teppō in battle. but still commanded his men to victory.

He ran into an incident later in 1593 when his forces apparently attacked a group of Korean bandits who were attempting to raid their food supplies. He was nearly fired for this incident but was saved by the Korean court who put in many good words for his valor.

Wu was one of the most active general in the war, being stationed in Korea for extensive periods of time during the peace talks, and also part taking in the second war of 1597–98.

== Later life ==
Wu was already in his late 50s early 60s when in Korea, so he retired soon after the war and returned home.

== Bibliography ==
- 嘉慶 義烏縣誌 人物誌 吳惟忠傳 (The local records of Yiwu county in the times of Jiajing)
- 明史 (The History of Ming)
- 宣祖實錄 (The Annals of Seonjo)
- 經略復國要編 宋應昌 著 (The letter collections of Song Yingchang)
