= Second siege of Ulsan =

Second Siege of Ulsan
- Part of the Imjin War
Date	Late October – 2 November 1598
Location	Ulsan Japanese Castle, Ulsan, Southern Korean Peninsula 35°33′00″N 129°19′00″E
Result	Japanese victory Withdrawal of Ming and Korean forces

Belligerents
Joseon and Ming dynasty	Toyotomi Hideyoshi's Japanese army

Commanders and leaders
Ma Gui; Gim Eungseo	Katō Kiyomasa

Strength
Ming: 24,000; Joseon: 5,500	10,000

Casualties and losses
?	2,000+

The allied army, number 29,500 men, laid siege to Tosan near Ulsan in late October. The fortress was too heavily fortified to attempt an assault, however a series of engagements did occur around the area, resulting in more than 2,000 Japanese casualties. Allied forces lifted the siege on 2 November, and Katō Kiyomasa's men departed for Japan shortly afterward. Hachisuka Iemasa and Kuroda Yoshitaka were reported by Nagataka Fukuhara for not pursuing the allied army, which incurred the wrath of Toyotomi Hideyoshi.

== Bibliography ==
- Hawley, Samuel (2005), The Imjin War, The Royal Asiatic Society, Korea Branch/UC Berkeley Press, ISBN 978-89-954424-2-5
- Stramigioli, Giuliana (December 1954), "Hideyoshi's Expansionist Policy on the Asiatic Mainland", Transactions of the Asiatic Society of Japan, Third Series, 3: 74–116
- Swope, Kenneth M. (2006), "Beyond Turtleboats: Siege Accounts from Hideyoshi's Second Invasion of Korea, 1597–1598", Sungkyun Journal of East Asian Studies, 6 (2): 177–206
- Swope, Kenneth M. (2005), "Crouching Tigers, Secret Weapons: Military Technology Employed During the Sino-Japanese-Korean War, 1592–1598", The Journal of Military History, 69: 11–42, doi:10.1353/jmh.2005.0059, S2CID 159829515
- Swope, Kenneth M. (December 2002), "Deceit, Disguise, and Dependence: China, Japan, and the Future of the Tributary System, 1592–1596", The International History Review, 24 (4): 757–1008, doi:10.1080/07075332.2002.9640980, S2CID 154827808
- Swope, Kenneth M. (2009), A Dragon's Head and a Serpent's Tail: Ming China and the First Great East Asian War, 1592–1598, University of Oklahoma Press
- Turnbull, Stephen (2002), Samurai Invasion: Japan's Korean War 1592–98, Cassell & Co, ISBN 978-0-304-35948-6
- Turnbull, Stephen (2008), The Samurai Invasion of Korea 1592-98, Osprey Publishing Ltd
- Turnbull, Stephen (1998), The Samurai Sourcebook, Cassell & Co, ISBN 978-1-85409-523-7
