= Battle of Dadaejin =

The Battle of Dadaejin
- Part of Imjin War
Date	May 24, 1592 (Gregorian Calendar); April 14, 1592 (Lunar calendar)
Location	Dadaejin, Busan 35°06′00″N 129°02′25″E
Result	Japanese victory

Belligerents
Toyotomi Japan	Kingdom of Joseon

Commanders and leaders
Konishi Yukinaga	Yun Hŭngsin †; Pak Hong

Strength
At least 7,000 men	800 men

Casualties and losses
Unknown	Entire garrison massacred or most killed
- Location within South Korea Battle of Dadaejin (Korea)

The Battle of Dadaejin and the Siege of Busan were the first battles of the Japanese invasions of Korea (1592–1598) and occurred simultaneously on April 13–14, 1592 (Gregorian: May 23–24, 1592).

== Background ==
The Japanese invasion force consisting of 400 transports bearing 18,700 men under the command of Konishi Yukinaga departed from Tsushima Island on April 13 (Gregorian: May 23) and arrived at Busan harbor without any incident, and the Japanese commenced landing operations from 0400 the following morning.

The commanders of the Japanese forces were Konishi, Sō Yoshitoshi, Matsura Shigenobu, Arima Harunobu, Ōmura Yoshiaki and Gotō Mototsugu, all of whom (with the exception of Matsura) were Kirishitans, as were many of their men. While Sō Yoshitoshi attacked Busan, Konishi led a smaller force against the fort of Dadaejin, located a few kilometers to the southwest of Busan at the mouth of the Nakdeong River.

== Battle ==
Konishi Yukinaga's first attack was repelled by Yun Hŭngsin. The second attack came at night when Japanese forces filled the moat with rocks and lumber under cover of gunfire before scaling the walls using bamboo ladders. The entire garrison was massacred.

== Aftermath ==
The following day, Konishi and Sō recombined their forces, and then advanced towards the fortress of Dongnae located ten kilometers northeast on the main road to Seoul.

== See also ==
- Japanese invasions of Korea (1592–1598)
- List of battles during the Japanese invasions of Korea (1592–1598)
- Timeline of the Japanese invasions of Korea

== Bibliography ==
- Alagappa, Muthiah (2003), Asian Security Order: Instrumental and Normative Features, Stanford University Press, ISBN 978-0-8047-4629-8
- Arano, Yasunori (2005), The Formation of a Japanocentric World Order, International Journal of Asian Studies
- Brown, Delmer M. (May 1948), "The Impact of Firearms on Japanese Warfare, 1543–1598", The Far Eastern Quarterly, 7 (3): 236–53, doi:10.2307/2048846, JSTOR 2048846, S2CID 162924328
- Eikenberry, Karl W. (1988), "The Imjin War", Military Review, 68 (2): 74–82
- Ha, Tae-hung; Sohn, Pow-key (1977), 'Nanjung Ilgi: War Diary of Admiral Yi Sun-sin, Yonsei University Press, ISBN 978-89-7141-018-9
- Haboush, JaHyun Kim (2016), The Great East Asian War and the Birth of the Korean Nation
- Hawley, Samuel (2005), The Imjin War, The Royal Asiatic Society, Korea Branch/UC Berkeley Press, ISBN 978-89-954424-2-5
- Jang, Pyun-soon (1998), Noon-eu-ro Bo-nen Han-gook-yauk-sa 5: Gor-yeo Si-dae (눈으로 보는 한국역사 5: 고려시대), Park Doo-ui, Bae Keum-ram, Yi Sang-mi, Kim Ho-hyun, Kim Pyung-sook, et al., Joog-ang Gyo-yook-yaun-goo-won. 1998-10-30. Seoul, Korea.
- Kim, Ki-chung (Fall 1999), "Resistance, Abduction, and Survival: The Documentary Literature of the Imjin War (1592–8)", Korean Culture, 20 (3): 20–29
- Kim, Yung-sik (1998), "Problems and Possibilities in the Study of the History of Korean Science", Osiris, 2nd Series, 13: 48–79, doi:10.1086/649280, JSTOR 301878, S2CID 143724260
- 桑田忠親 [Kuwata, Tadachika], ed., 舊參謀本部編纂, [Kyu Sanbo Honbu], 朝鮮の役 [Chousen no Eki] (日本の戰史 [Nihon no Senshi] Vol. 5), 1965.
- Neves, Jaime Ramalhete (1994), "The Portuguese in the Im-Jim War?", Review of Culture, 18: 20–24
- Niderost, Eric (June 2001), "Turtleboat Destiny: The Imjin War and Yi Sun Shin", Military Heritage, 2 (6): 50–59, 89
- Niderost, Eric (January 2002), "The Miracle at Myongnyang, 1597", Osprey Military Journal, 4 (1): 44–50
- Park, Yune-hee (1973), Admiral Yi Sun-shin and His Turtleboat Armada: A Comprehensive Account of the Resistance of Korea to the 16th Century Japanese Invasion, Shinsaeng Press
- Rockstein, Edward D. (1993), Strategic And Operational Aspects of Japan's Invasions of Korea 1592–1598 1993-6-18, Naval War College
- Sadler, A. L. (June 1937), "The Naval Campaign in the Korean War of Hideyoshi (1592–1598)", Transactions of the Asiatic Society of Japan, Second Series, 14: 179–208
- Sansom, George (1961), A History of Japan 1334–1615, Stanford University Press, ISBN 978-0-8047-0525-7
- Sohn, Pow-key (April–June 1959), "Early Korean Painting", Journal of the American Oriental Society, 79 (2): 96–103, doi:10.2307/595851, JSTOR 595851
- Stramigioli, Giuliana (December 1954), "Hideyoshi's Expansionist Policy on the Asiatic Mainland", Transactions of the Asiatic Society of Japan, Third Series, 3: 74–116
- Strauss, Barry (Summer 2005), "Korea's Legendary Admiral", MHQ: The Quarterly Journal of Military History, 17 (4): 52–61
- Swope, Kenneth M. (2006), "Beyond Turtleboats: Siege Accounts from Hideyoshi's Second Invasion of Korea, 1597–1598", Sungkyun Journal of East Asian Studies, 6 (2): 177–206
- Swope, Kenneth M. (2005), "Crouching Tigers, Secret Weapons: Military Technology Employed During the Sino-Japanese-Korean War, 1592–1598", The Journal of Military History, 69: 11–42, doi:10.1353/jmh.2005.0059, S2CID 159829515
- Swope, Kenneth M. (December 2002), "Deceit, Disguise, and Dependence: China, Japan, and the Future of the Tributary System, 1592–1596", The International History Review, 24 (4): 757–1008, doi:10.1080/07075332.2002.9640980, S2CID 154827808
- Swope, Kenneth M. (2009), A Dragon's Head and a Serpent's Tail: Ming China and the First Great East Asian War, 1592–1598, University of Oklahoma Press
- Turnbull, Stephen (2002), Samurai Invasion: Japan's Korean War 1592–98, Cassell & Co, ISBN 978-0-304-35948-6
- Turnbull, Stephen (2008), The Samurai Invasion of Korea 1592-98, Osprey Publishing Ltd
- Turnbull, Stephen (1998), The Samurai Sourcebook, Cassell & Co, ISBN 978-1-85409-523-7
- Villiers, John (1980), SILK and Silver: Macau, Manila and Trade in the China Seas in the Sixteenth Century (A lecture delivered to the Hong Kong Branch of the Royal Asiatic Society at the Hong Kong Club. 10 June 1980)
- Yi, Min-woong (2004), Imjin Wae-ran Haejeonsa: The Naval Battles of the Imjin War [임진왜란 해전사], Chongoram Media [청어람미디어], ISBN 978-89-89722-49-6
