= Yi Gwang (general) =

Korean commander

Yi Gwang (Korean: 이광; Hanja: 李洸, 1541–1607) was a commander of Korean Joseon Dynasty forces throughout Toyotomi Hideyoshi's invasions of Korea at the end of the 16th century.

Yi is best known for his participation in the Battle of Jeonju, which took place in 1592, the first year of the invasions. Yi defeated the enemy commander Kobayakawa Takakage, securing what would come to be seen as one of the most important victories for the Koreans over the Japanese on land, throughout both invasions.
