= Battle of Byeokjegwan =

1593 battle of the Japanese invasions of Korea

- Part of the Japanese invasions of Korea (1592–1598)
Date	27 February 1593
Location	Byeokjegwan, a postal station on the road to Hanseong
Result	Japanese victory

Belligerents
Japanese Sixth Division and reinforcements	Ming dynasty army and Korean allies

Commanders and leaders
Kobayakawa Takakage; Sayo Masakatsu; Awaya Kagenao; Inoue Kagesada; Tachibana Muneshige; Takahashi Munemasu; Kikkawa Hiroie	Li Rusong; Zha Dashou; Ko Ŏnbaek; Yang Yuan; Zheng Wenbin; Li Rumei; Li Yousheng

Strength
Chinese sources <41,000 Japanese sources <21,000	Chinese sources ~5,000 Japanese sources <20,000

Casualties and losses
Sources: Japanese: a few hundred Wu Weishan: 120; Yun Kŭnsu: 300; Yi Tŏkhyŏng: 500–600	Sources: Japanese: 6,000–10,000; Li Rusong: 264 killed, 49 wounded, 276 horses Wu Weishan: 1,500; Yun Kŭnsu: 300; Yi Tŏkhyŏng: 500–600

Battle of Byeokjegwan

Chinese name
- Traditional Chinese: 碧蹄館之戰
- Simplified Chinese: 碧蹄馆之战
Transcriptions
Standard Mandarin
- Hanyu Pinyin: Bītíguǎn zhī zhàn

Korean name
- Hangul: 벽제관 전투
- Hanja: 碧蹄館戰鬪

Japanese name
- Kanji: 碧蹄館の戦い
Transcriptions
- Romanization: Hekiteikan no tatakai

The Battle of Byeokjegwan was a military engagement fought in the winter of 27 February 1593, between the armies of the Ming dynasty led by Li Rusong and Japanese forces under Kobayakawa Takakage. It resulted in a Japanese victory and Ming retreat.

== Background ==
After taking Pyeongyang, Li Rusong sent out Li Rubai, Zhang Shijue, and Yang Yuan with 8,000 troops. They retook Gaeseong on 19 February, and then the provinces of Hwanghae, Gyeonggi, and Gangweon.

Next, Li sent out scouting parties toward Hanseong, which Yu Sŏngnyong claimed had only some 10,000 Japanese troops. Yang Yuan, Li Rubai, and Zhang Shijue were given 2,000 men and ordered to take positions north of Hanseong. When reports that the Japanese were pulling out of Hanseong came in, Li himself decided to head out with his vanguard, leaving the artillery behind. He sent Li Ning and Zu Chengxun even further ahead.

== Battle ==
The 3,000-strong advance force led by Zha Dashou, Zu Chengxun, and Ko Ŏnbaek encountered a Japanese force of about 500 led by Jūji Den'emon. The Ming force retreated, luring Jūji into a bombardment and counterattack, killing 100. Jūji's remaining troops retreated and Tachibana Muneshige attacked the Ming right flank with 2,000 troops. After suffering heavy losses due to a lack of cavalry, Tachibana retreated into the hills with 200 soldiers armed with firearms providing cover fire to prevent Ming forces from pursuing.

Reinforcements led by Kobayakawa Takakage arrived at the battle, bringing Japanese forces to 15,000, forcing the Ming scouting party to retreat. At the same time, Li Rusong also arrived with 2,000 troops. Upon being informed of the Japanese presence by retreating soldiers, Li decided to take only half his men and charge ahead . Li Rusong's 1,000 cavalry encountered 3,000 troops under Awaya Kagenao occupying the hills around Byeokjegwan and fired on them with rockets. Awaya responded with matchlock fire but was unable to stop the rapid cavalry advance and was forced to retreat. However this led Li into a bowl-shaped area where Inoue Kagesada brought 3,000 troops to attack his left flank and Awaya his front.

Meanwhile, 5,000 Japanese troops attacked the retreating Ming forces led by Zha Dashou. Inoue and Awaya's men were relieved of their positions by Kobayakawa and Tachibana, while they marched north to encircle the Ming forces. Seeing that the situation was lost, Li gave the orders to retreat. Yang Yuan joined the battle with the 1,000 cavalry Li had left behind, catching the Japanese in a pincer attack, allowing Li to retreat.

Li Rusong's horse was shot out from under him and was almost killed, however, Li Yousheng used his body as a shield to cover him. Li Rusong's brother, Li Rumei, then shot out the assailant's horse from under him.

The battle lasted from late morning until noon. Finally Li Rusong was forced to retreat in the face of superior numbers.

== Aftermath ==
The Japanese burned all the grass within the vicinity of Hanseong to deprive the Ming cavalry of fodder. According to Samuel Hawley, this led to the death of some 10,000 horses within a few days, but this number is disputed and possibly accounts for all horse casualties in the entire war.

After the failure at Byeokjegwan, some Koreans called for the replacement of Li Rusong with Luo Shangzhi. Li also came under fire from his own subordinates. Wang Bidi accused him of denying his men adequate food and drink, directing battles from the rear, and refusing to give out the money or titles he had promised to those who first ascended the walls of Pyeongyang. Li deflected the blame towards Song Yingchang, a civil official.

According to Japanese sources such as the Chōsen seibatsuki and Chōsen gunki monogatari series (tales from the Joseon war) published during the mid-17th century or later, 6,000 or 10,000 Ming Chinese soldiers were killed while the Japanese suffered only a few hundred casualties. There is reason to suspect that these reports may be faulty. A tally of Japanese forces on 23 March 1593, counted only 1,133 men (1,132 in another source) among the forces of Tachibana Muneshige and 290 for Takahashi Munemasu, a decrease of 1,800 from their original strength of 3,300. Tachibana's forces did not participate in another battle for the rest of the campaign. According to Li Rusong, of the Ming forces, 264 soldiers were killed, 49 were wounded, and 276 horses were killed. Another Ming general, Wu Weishan, said the Japanese lost 120 while the Ming forces suffered 1,500 casualties. Yun Kŭnsu, an official of Joseon, stated that both Japanese and Chinese forces suffered 300 casualties. Another Joseon official, Yi Tŏkhyŏng, said both Japanese and Chinese forces suffered 500-600 casualties.

== Bibliography ==
- Alagappa, Muthiah (2003), Asian Security Order: Instrumental and Normative Features, Stanford University Press, ISBN 978-0-8047-4629-8
- Arano, Yasunori (2005), The Formation of a Japanocentric World Order, International Journal of Asian Studies
- Brown, Delmer M. (May 1948), "The Impact of Firearms on Japanese Warfare, 1543–1598", The Far Eastern Quarterly, 7 (3): 236–53, doi:10.2307/2048846, JSTOR 2048846, S2CID 162924328
- Eikenberry, Karl W. (1988), "The Imjin War", Military Review, 68 (2): 74–82
- Ha, Tae-hung; Sohn, Pow-key (1977), 'Nanjung Ilgi: War Diary of Admiral Yi Sun-sin, Yonsei University Press, ISBN 978-89-7141-018-9
- Haboush, JaHyun Kim (2016), The Great East Asian War and the Birth of the Korean Nation
- Hawley, Samuel (2005), The Imjin War, The Royal Asiatic Society, Korea Branch/UC Berkeley Press, ISBN 978-89-954424-2-5
- Jang, Pyun-soon (1998), Noon-eu-ro Bo-nen Han-gook-yauk-sa 5: Gor-yeo Si-dae (눈으로 보는 한국역사 5: 고려시대), Park Doo-ui, Bae Keum-ram, Yi Sang-mi, Kim Ho-hyun, Kim Pyung-sook, et al., Joog-ang Gyo-yook-yaun-goo-won. 1998-10-30. Seoul, Korea.
- Kim, Ki-chung (Fall 1999), "Resistance, Abduction, and Survival: The Documentary Literature of the Imjin War (1592–8)", Korean Culture, 20 (3): 20–29
- Kim, Yung-sik (1998), "Problems and Possibilities in the Study of the History of Korean Science", Osiris, 2nd Series, 13: 48–79, doi:10.1086/649280, JSTOR 301878, S2CID 143724260
- 桑田忠親 [Kuwata, Tadachika], ed., 舊參謀本部編纂, [Kyu Sanbo Honbu], 朝鮮の役 [Chousen no Eki] (日本の戰史 [Nihon no Senshi] Vol. 5), 1965.
- Neves, Jaime Ramalhete (1994), "The Portuguese in the Im-Jim War?", Review of Culture, 18: 20–24
- Niderost, Eric (June 2001), "Turtleboat Destiny: The Imjin War and Yi Sun Shin", Military Heritage, 2 (6): 50–59, 89
- Niderost, Eric (January 2002), "The Miracle at Myongnyang, 1597", Osprey Military Journal, 4 (1): 44–50
- Park, Yune-hee (1973), Admiral Yi Sun-shin and His Turtleboat Armada: A Comprehensive Account of the Resistance of Korea to the 16th Century Japanese Invasion, Shinsaeng Press
- Rockstein, Edward D. (1993), Strategic And Operational Aspects of Japan's Invasions of Korea 1592–1598 1993-6-18, Naval War College
- Sadler, A. L. (June 1937), "The Naval Campaign in the Korean War of Hideyoshi (1592–1598)", Transactions of the Asiatic Society of Japan, Second Series, 14: 179–208
- Sansom, George (1961), A History of Japan 1334–1615, Stanford University Press, ISBN 978-0-8047-0525-7
- Sohn, Pow-key (April–June 1959), "Early Korean Painting", Journal of the American Oriental Society, 79 (2): 96–103, doi:10.2307/595851, JSTOR 595851
- Stramigioli, Giuliana (December 1954), "Hideyoshi's Expansionist Policy on the Asiatic Mainland", Transactions of the Asiatic Society of Japan, Third Series, 3: 74–116
- Strauss, Barry (Summer 2005), "Korea's Legendary Admiral", MHQ: The Quarterly Journal of Military History, 17 (4): 52–61
- Swope, Kenneth M. (2006), "Beyond Turtleboats: Siege Accounts from Hideyoshi's Second Invasion of Korea, 1597–1598", Sungkyun Journal of East Asian Studies, 6 (2): 177–206
- Swope, Kenneth M. (2005), "Crouching Tigers, Secret Weapons: Military Technology Employed During the Sino-Japanese-Korean War, 1592–1598", The Journal of Military History, 69: 11–42, doi:10.1353/jmh.2005.0059, S2CID 159829515
- Swope, Kenneth M. (December 2002), "Deceit, Disguise, and Dependence: China, Japan, and the Future of the Tributary System, 1592–1596", The International History Review, 24 (4): 757–1008, doi:10.1080/07075332.2002.9640980, S2CID 154827808
- Swope, Kenneth M. (2009), A Dragon's Head and a Serpent's Tail: Ming China and the First Great East Asian War, 1592–1598, University of Oklahoma Press
- Turnbull, Stephen (2002), Samurai Invasion: Japan's Korean War 1592–98, Cassell & Co, ISBN 978-0-304-35948-6
- Turnbull, Stephen (2008), The Samurai Invasion of Korea 1592-98, Osprey Publishing Ltd
- Turnbull, Stephen (1998), The Samurai Sourcebook, Cassell & Co, ISBN 978-1-85409-523-7
- Villiers, John (1980), SILK and Silver: Macau, Manila and Trade in the China Seas in the Sixteenth Century (A lecture delivered to the Hong Kong Branch of the Royal Asiatic Society at the Hong Kong Club. 10 June 1980) (PDF), The HKUL Digital Initiatives
- Yi, Min-woong (2004), Imjin Wae-ran Haejeonsa: The Naval Battles of the Imjin War [임진왜란 해전사], Chongoram Media [청어람미디어], ISBN 978-89-89722-49-6
