= Battle of Imjin River (1592) =

Battle during the 1592 invasion of Korea

Coordinates: 37°47′N 126°40′E

- Part of Imjin War
Date	July 6–7, 1592 (Gregorian Calendar); May 17–18, 1592 (Lunar calendar)
Location	Imjin River
Result	Japanese victory

Belligerents
Joseon	Toyotomi Japan

Commanders and leaders
Kim Myŏngwŏn; Yi Il; Yi Yang-won; Yu Geukryang †; Sin Hal †	Katō Kiyomasa; Konishi Yukinaga; Kuroda Nagamasa; Mori Terumoto; Ukita Hideie; Kuki Yoshitaka

Strength
10,000 or 13,000 Korean army	20,000

Casualties and losses
Unknown	Minimal

The Battle of Imjin River (Japanese: 臨津江の戦い) was a battle during the 1592 Japanese invasion of Korea. Kim Myŏngwŏn's northern defense was defeated and the Japanese were able to cross over and invade northern Korea.

== Background ==
The Joseon royal family left Hanseong for Pyeongyang on 9 June, a few days before the Japanese took the city on 12 June. When the Japanese arrived they found the city destroyed and in anarchy. After resting for two weeks in Hanseong, the Japanese armies resumed their advance on 27 June. The Japanese vanguard was the army under Konishi Yukinaga and Sō Yoshitoshi, followed by the army of Kato Kiyomasa and the army of Kuroda Nagamasa. The Japanese forces arrived at the Imjin River without difficulty, but found that the Koreans had finally managed to mount an effective defense, and had 10,000 soldiers amassed on the far bank under the command of Kim Myŏngwŏn.

== Battle ==
Although the Korean forces were in an ideal position, able to cut down the Japanese as they crossed the river in small numbers, the Korean army was hampered by the lack of a clear chain-of-command. Some of the defenders were not under Kim's command, including 3000 men from northern Korea under the government minister Han Ung-in.

Seeing that the Koreans would not budge after waiting for ten days, the Japanese forces conducted a false retreat to lure them into attacking. The Koreans took the bait. One inexperienced commander, Sin Hal, immediately ordered his men to cross the river and attack the Japanese. A more experienced commander, Yu Geuk-ryang, was unable to dissuade him and ended up leading the charge himself after being accused of cowardice. Some of Han Un-in's veterans, experienced in Jurchen tactics, were also reluctant to follow, suspecting it to be a ruse, but they were executed. Kim Myŏngwŏn thought the attack was a bad idea, but could do not stop it since he did not have full control over the entire army.

A portion of the Korean army thus crossed the river and rushed past the abandoned Japanese campsite into the ambush. The Japanese fired on them with muskets and chased them to the river, where they were slaughtered. Yu Geuk-ryang and Sin Hal were both killed. A civil official on the north bank of the river fled. Surrounding soldiers thought that he was Kim Myŏngwŏn, so they panicked and fled as well, abandoning the defense.

== Aftermath ==
The Japanese crossed the river by 7 July and took Kaesong without a fight. Afterwards the three divisions split up. Konishi Yukinaga went north to Pyeongyang, Kuroda Nagamasa went west to Hwanghae, and Katō Kiyomasa headed northeast to Hamgyeong.

On 10 June, King Seonjo began preparations to abandon Pyongyang for Yongbyon further north and by 16 July the vanguard of Konishi Yukinaga's forces had reached the south bank of the Taedong River within sight of the walls of Pyongyang.

== In popular culture ==
This battle is celebrated in Activision's video game Shogun: Total War under "Imjin". The historical error in the game is that the Koreans have infantry forces only, while Japanese have balanced combined armed forces. Also the game shows the river having a bridge, which was not the case until the 20th century.

== See also ==
- List of battles during the Japanese invasions of Korea (1592–1598)
- Timeline of the Japanese invasions of Korea

== Bibliography ==
- Alagappa, Muthiah (2003), Asian Security Order: Instrumental and Normative Features, Stanford University Press, ISBN 978-0-8047-4629-8
- Arano, Yasunori (2005), The Formation of a Japanocentric World Order, International Journal of Asian Studies
- Brown, Delmer M. (May 1948), "The Impact of Firearms on Japanese Warfare, 1543–1598", The Far Eastern Quarterly, 7 (3): 236–53, doi:10.2307/2048846, JSTOR 2048846, S2CID 162924328
- Eikenberry, Karl W. (1988), "The Imjin War", Military Review, 68 (2): 74–82
- Ha, Tae-hung; Sohn, Pow-key (1977), 'Nanjung Ilgi: War Diary of Admiral Yi Sun-sin, Yonsei University Press, ISBN 978-89-7141-018-9
- Haboush, JaHyun Kim (2016), The Great East Asian War and the Birth of the Korean Nation
- Hawley, Samuel (2005), The Imjin War, The Royal Asiatic Society, Korea Branch/UC Berkeley Press, ISBN 978-89-954424-2-5
- Jang, Pyun-soon (1998), Noon-eu-ro Bo-nen Han-gook-yauk-sa 5: Gor-yeo Si-dae (눈으로 보는 한국역사 5: 고려시대), Park Doo-ui, Bae Keum-ram, Yi Sang-mi, Kim Ho-hyun, Kim Pyung-sook, et al., Joog-ang Gyo-yook-yaun-goo-won. 1998-10-30. Seoul, Korea.
- Kim, Ki-chung (Fall 1999), "Resistance, Abduction, and Survival: The Documentary Literature of the Imjin War (1592–8)", Korean Culture, 20 (3): 20–29
- Kim, Yung-sik (1998), "Problems and Possibilities in the Study of the History of Korean Science", Osiris, 2nd Series, 13: 48–79, doi:10.1086/649280, JSTOR 301878, S2CID 143724260
- 桑田忠親 [Kuwata, Tadachika], ed., 舊參謀本部編纂, [Kyu Sanbo Honbu], 朝鮮の役 [Chousen no Eki] (日本の戰史 [Nihon no Senshi] Vol. 5), 1965.
- Neves, Jaime Ramalhete (1994), "The Portuguese in the Im-Jim War?", Review of Culture, 18: 20–24
- Niderost, Eric (June 2001), "Turtleboat Destiny: The Imjin War and Yi Sun Shin", Military Heritage, 2 (6): 50–59, 89
- Niderost, Eric (January 2002), "The Miracle at Myongnyang, 1597", Osprey Military Journal, 4 (1): 44–50
- Park, Yune-hee (1973), Admiral Yi Sun-shin and His Turtleboat Armada: A Comprehensive Account of the Resistance of Korea to the 16th Century Japanese Invasion, Shinsaeng Press
- Rockstein, Edward D. (1993), Strategic And Operational Aspects of Japan's Invasions of Korea 1592–1598 1993-6-18, Naval War College
- Sadler, A. L. (June 1937), "The Naval Campaign in the Korean War of Hideyoshi (1592–1598)", Transactions of the Asiatic Society of Japan, Second Series, 14: 179–208
- Sansom, George (1961), A History of Japan 1334–1615, Stanford University Press, ISBN 978-0-8047-0525-7
- Sohn, Pow-key (April–June 1959), "Early Korean Painting", Journal of the American Oriental Society, 79 (2): 96–103, doi:10.2307/595851, JSTOR 595851
- Stramigioli, Giuliana (December 1954), "Hideyoshi's Expansionist Policy on the Asiatic Mainland", Transactions of the Asiatic Society of Japan, Third Series, 3: 74–116
- Strauss, Barry (Summer 2005), "Korea's Legendary Admiral", MHQ: The Quarterly Journal of Military History, 17 (4): 52–61
- Swope, Kenneth M. (2006), "Beyond Turtleboats: Siege Accounts from Hideyoshi's Second Invasion of Korea, 1597–1598", Sungkyun Journal of East Asian Studies, 6 (2): 177–206
- Swope, Kenneth M. (2005), "Crouching Tigers, Secret Weapons: Military Technology Employed During the Sino-Japanese-Korean War, 1592–1598", The Journal of Military History, 69: 11–42, doi:10.1353/jmh.2005.0059, S2CID 159829515
- Swope, Kenneth M. (December 2002), "Deceit, Disguise, and Dependence: China, Japan, and the Future of the Tributary System, 1592–1596", The International History Review, 24 (4): 757–1008, doi:10.1080/07075332.2002.9640980, S2CID 154827808
- Swope, Kenneth M. (2009), A Dragon's Head and a Serpent's Tail: Ming China and the First Great East Asian War, 1592–1598, University of Oklahoma Press
- Turnbull, Stephen (2002), Samurai Invasion: Japan's Korean War 1592–98, Cassell & Co, ISBN 978-0-304-35948-6
- Turnbull, Stephen (2008), The Samurai Invasion of Korea 1592-98, Osprey Publishing Ltd
- Turnbull, Stephen (1998), The Samurai Sourcebook, Cassell & Co, ISBN 978-1-85409-523-7
- Villiers, John (1980), SILK and Silver: Macau, Manila and Trade in the China Seas in the Sixteenth Century (A lecture delivered to the Hong Kong Branch of the Royal Asiatic Society at the Hong Kong Club. 10 June 1980)
- Yi, Min-woong (2004), Imjin Wae-ran Haejeonsa: The Naval Battles of the Imjin War [임진왜란 해전사], Chongoram Media [청어람미디어], ISBN 978-89-89722-49-6

== See also ==
- Battle of Chungju
- Battle of Sangju (1592)
- Imjin War
