= Kim Ŭngsŏ =

Korean military officer (1564–1624)

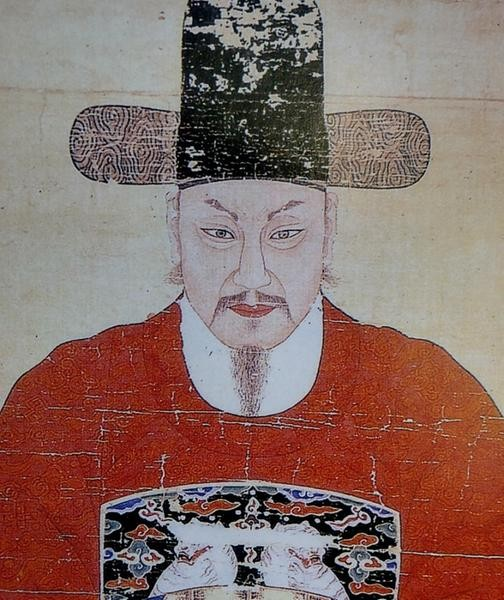

Korean name
- Hangul: 김응서
- Hanja: 金應瑞
- RR: Gim Eungseo
- MR: Kim Ŭngsŏ

Courtesy name
- Hangul: 성보
- Hanja: 聖甫
- RR: Seongbo
- MR: Sŏngbo

Alternative name
- Hangul: 김경서
- Hanja: 金景瑞
- RR: Gim Gyeongseo
- MR: Kim Kyŏngsŏ

Kim Ŭngsŏ (Korean: 김응서; Hanja: 金應瑞; 1564–1624) was a senior military officer in the Joseon dynasty. During the Imjin War, he was in charge of soldiers and horses in the Eastern Gyeongsang Province.

During this war, he was ordered to proceed north with his troops and fight the Jurchens instead of the Japanese. His army of 15,000 Koreans later joined the Chinese Commander Ma Gui and 24,000 Chinese soldiers in the Second Siege of Ulsan; the combined force failed to take the Japanese Castle.

The house where he was born in Okto-ri, Ryonggang County, Nampo is considered one of the National Treasures of North Korea.

== See also ==
- Kim Ung-so House
