= Battle of Jeonju =

Battle of Chonju
- Part of Japanese invasions of Korea (1592–1598)
Date	1592
Location	area near the provinces of Geumsan
Result	Korean victory

Belligerents
Korean forces	Toyotomi forces

Commanders and leaders
Yi Gwang	Kobayakawa Takakage

The Battle of Jeonju was one of the first battles fought in Korea during the Japanese invasions of Korea (1592–1598).

Even though this was a rather minor battle compared to others during the Korean Campaign, it would be one of the very most important victories for the Korean forces over the Japanese situated on land. Korean commander Yi Gwang led his army, which ended up defeating the opposing commander, Kobayakawa Takakage, in which his division was driven back to Geumsan.
