= Hwangseoksan =

Mountain in South Korea

Coordinates: 35°39′24″N 127°45′27″E

Highest point
- Elevation: 1,235 m (4,052 ft)

Geography
- Location: South Gyeongsang Province, South Korea

Hwangseoksan is a mountain of South Gyeongsang Province, southeastern South Korea. It has an elevation of 1,235 metres.

== See also ==
- List of mountains of Korea
