= Battle of Haengju =

1593 Imjin War battle

- Part of Japanese invasions of Korea (1592–1598)
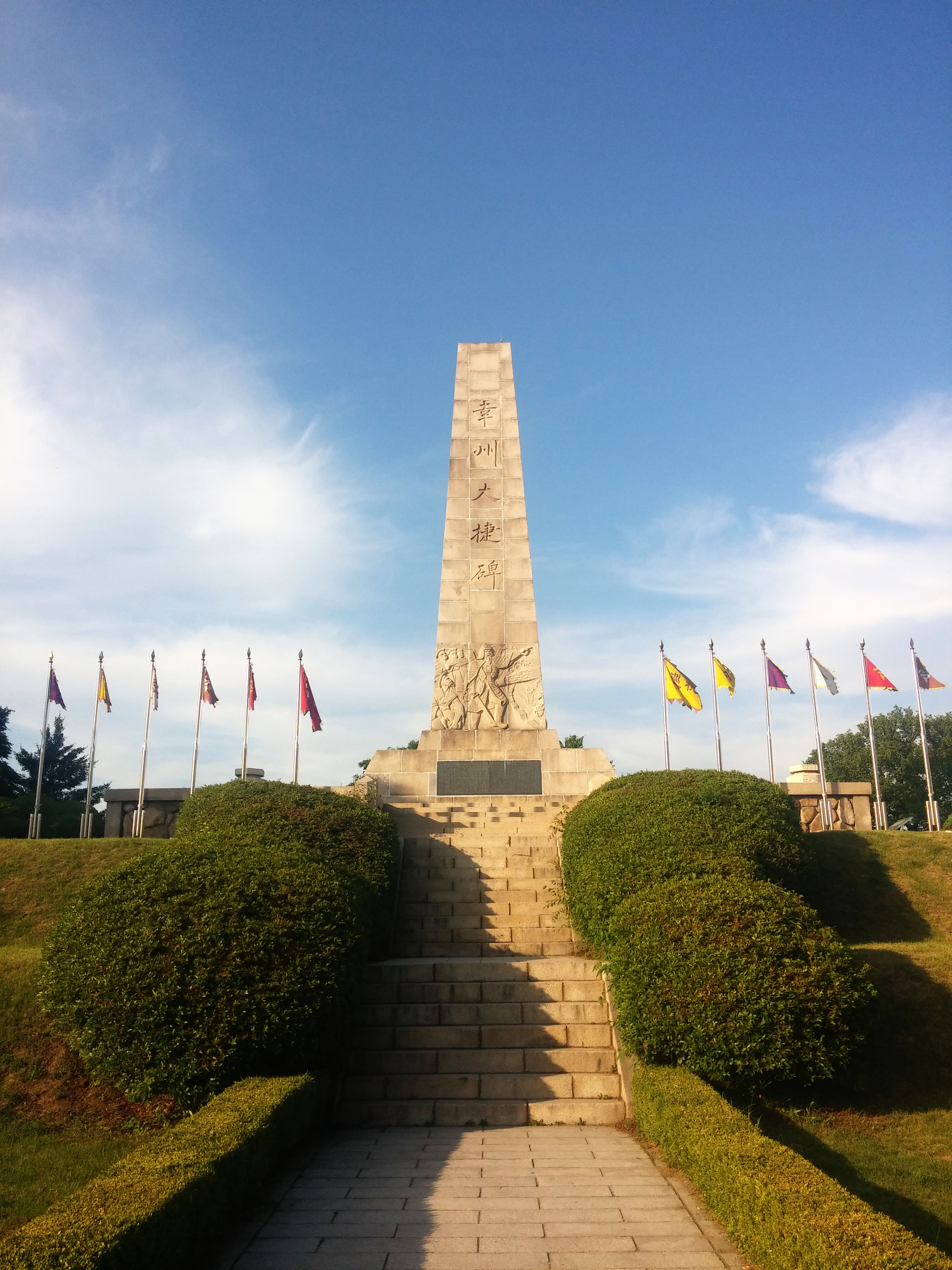
Date	14 March 1593
Location	On the Han River west of Hanseong, Joseon Korea 37°35′44″N 126°49′44″E
Result	Joseon victory

Belligerents
Joseon	Toyotomi Japan

Commanders and leaders
Gwon Yul	Ukita Hideie; Konishi Yukinaga; Kuroda Nagamasa; Ishida Mitsunari; Kobayakawa Takakage

Strength
2,300	30,000

Casualties and losses
?	110+ (likely much more since the Japanese took the dead back with them) or 10,000 dead and wounded
- Battle location on a map of modern Seoul Battle of Haengju (South Korea)

- Battle of Haengju
- Hangul: 행주 대첩
- Hanja: 幸州大捷
- RR: Haengju daecheop
- MR: Haengju taech'ŏp

The Battle of Haengju took place on 14 March 1593 during the 1592–1598 Japanese invasion of Korea. The Japanese attack failed to overcome the fortress Haengjusanseong.

== Background ==
Korean army general Gwon Yul was stationed at the fortress Haengjusanseong, a wooden stockade on a cliff over the Han River. Haengju posed a threat to Hanseong (modern Seoul and capital of Joseon) due to its proximity, so the Japanese attacked it in March.

== Battle ==
The Japanese attack led by Konishi Yukinaga happened on 14 March 1593 with 30,000 men. They took turns attacking the stockade due to the limited space. The Koreans retaliated with arrows, cannons, and hwacha.

After three attacks, one with siege tower, and one where Ishida Mitsunari was wounded, Ukita Hideie managed to breach the outer defenses and reach the inner wall. However, he was wounded as well and had to fall back.

In the last attack Kobayakawa Takakage burned a hole through the fort's log pilings, but the Koreans managed to hold them back long enough for it to be repaired.

When the Koreans had nearly run out of arrows, I Bun arrived with supply ships containing 10,000 more arrows, and they continued to fight on until dusk when the Japanese retreated.

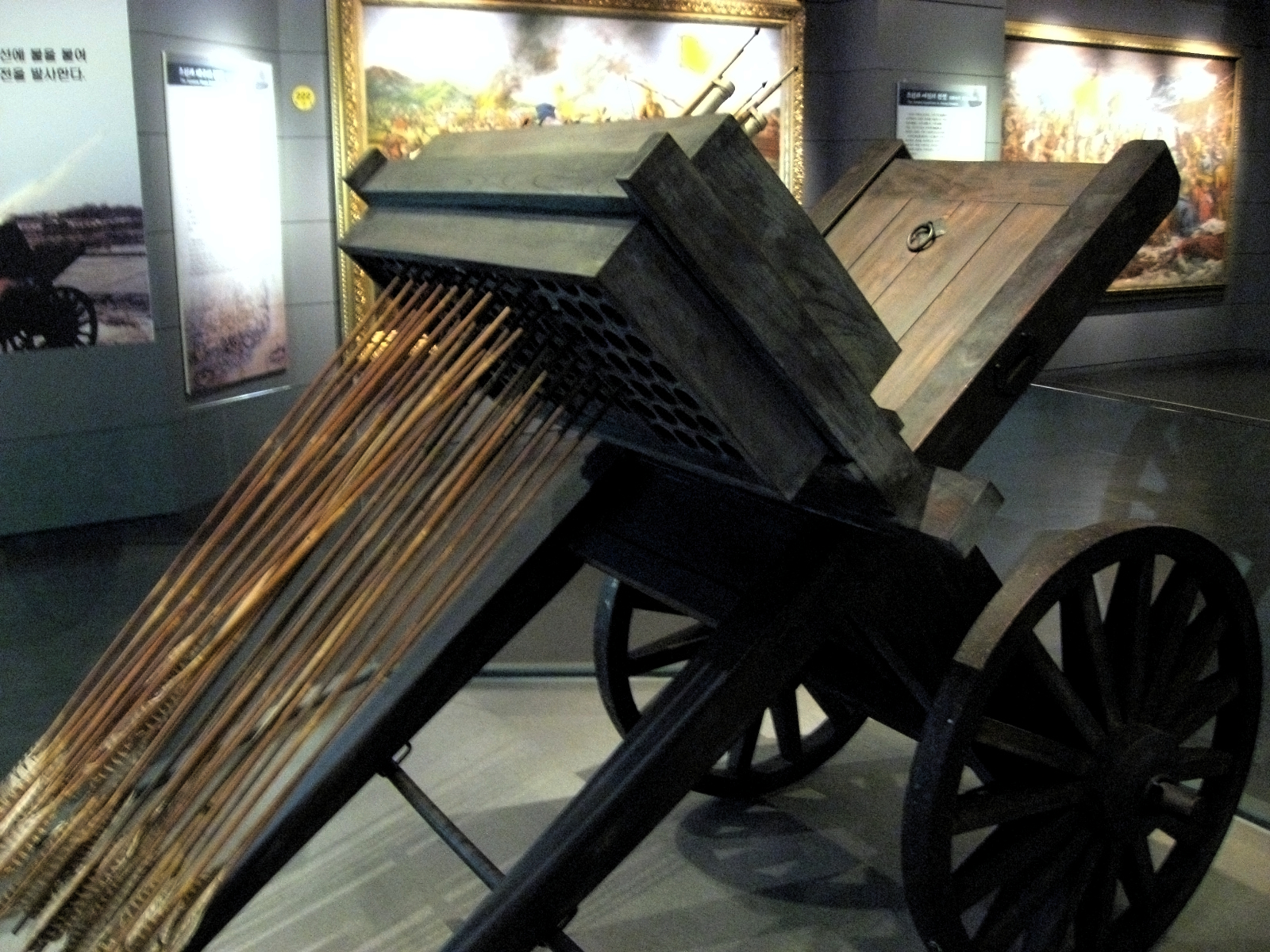
The Koreans used the hwacha for concentrated fire against the Japanese.

== Aftermath ==
Aside from the defeat, the Japanese situation became even more tenuous after Zha Dashou led a small group of raiders to Hanseong, burning more than 6,500 tons of grain. This left the Japanese with less than a month of provisions.

After several negotiations with Shen Weijing, the Japanese abandoned Hanseong on 17 May 1593. What Li Rusong and Song Yingchang witnessed upon entering the city was a people who "looked like ghosts."

== Legacy ==
The battle is celebrated today as one of the three most decisive Korean victories (the other two being the 1592 Battle of Hansan Island and the siege of Jinju). Today, the site of Haengjusanseong has a memorial built to honor Gwon Yul.

== See also ==
- List of fortresses in Korea
- Japanese invasions of Korea (1592–1598)

== Bibliography ==
- Turnbull, Stephen (2002). Samurai invasion: Japan's Korean War 1592-1598. Cassel & Co. ISBN 0-304-35948-3.
- Alagappa, Muthiah (2003), Asian Security Order: Instrumental and Normative Features, Stanford University Press, ISBN 0-8047-4629-X
- Arano, Yasunori (2005), The Formation of a Japanocentric World Order, International Journal of Asian Studies
- Brown, Delmer M. (May 1948), "The Impact of Firearms on Japanese Warfare, 1543–1598", The Far Eastern Quarterly, 7 (3): 236–53, doi:10.2307/2048846, JSTOR 2048846, S2CID 162924328
- Eikenberry, Karl W. (1988), "The Imjin War", Military Review, 68 (2): 74–82
- Ha, Tae-hung; Sohn, Pow-key (1977), 'Nanjung Ilgi: War Diary of Admiral Yi Sun-sin, Yonsei University Press, ISBN 89-7141-018-3
- Haboush, JaHyun Kim (2016), The Great East Asian War and the Birth of the Korean Nation
- Hawley, Samuel (2005), The Imjin War, The Royal Asiatic Society, Korea Branch/UC Berkeley Press, ISBN 89-954424-2-5
- Jang, Pyun-soon (1998), Noon-eu-ro Bo-nen Han-gook-yauk-sa 5: Gor-yeo Si-dae (눈으로 보는 한국역사 5: 고려시대), Park Doo-ui, Bae Keum-ram, Yi Sang-mi, Kim Ho-hyun, Kim Pyung-sook, et al., Joog-ang Gyo-yook-yaun-goo-won. 1998-10-30. Seoul, Korea.
- Kim, Ki-chung (Fall 1999), "Resistance, Abduction, and Survival: The Documentary Literature of the Imjin War (1592–8)", Korean Culture, 20 (3): 20–29
- Kim, Yung-sik (1998), "Problems and Possibilities in the Study of the History of Korean Science", Osiris, 2nd Series, 13: 48–79, doi:10.1086/649280, JSTOR 301878, S2CID 143724260
- 桑田忠親 [Kuwata, Tadachika], ed., 舊參謀本部編纂, [Kyu Sanbo Honbu], 朝鮮の役 [Chousen no Eki] (日本の戰史 [Nihon no Senshi] Vol. 5), 1965.
- Neves, Jaime Ramalhete (1994), "The Portuguese in the Im-Jim War?", Review of Culture, 18: 20–24
- Niderost, Eric (June 2001), "Turtleboat Destiny: The Imjin War and Yi Sun Shin", Military Heritage, 2 (6): 50–59, 89
- Niderost, Eric (January 2002), "The Miracle at Myongnyang, 1597", Osprey Military Journal, 4 (1): 44–50
- Park, Yune-hee (1973), Admiral Yi Sun-shin and His Turtleboat Armada: A Comprehensive Account of the Resistance of Korea to the 16th Century Japanese Invasion, Shinsaeng Press
- Rockstein, Edward D. (1993), Strategic and Operational Aspects of Japan's Invasions of Korea 1592–1598 1993-6-18, Naval War College
- Sadler, A. L. (June 1937), "The Naval Campaign in the Korean War of Hideyoshi (1592–1598)", Transactions of the Asiatic Society of Japan, Second Series, 14: 179–208
- Sansom, George (1961), A History of Japan 1334–1615, Stanford University Press Reprint: ISBN 0-8047-0525-9.
- Sohn, Pow-key (April–June 1959), "Early Korean Painting", Journal of the American Oriental Society, 79 (2): 96–103, doi:10.2307/595851, JSTOR 595851
- Stramigioli, Giuliana (December 1954), "Hideyoshi's Expansionist Policy on the Asiatic Mainland", Transactions of the Asiatic Society of Japan, Third Series, 3: 74–116
- Strauss, Barry (Summer 2005), "Korea's Legendary Admiral", MHQ: The Quarterly Journal of Military History, 17 (4): 52–61
- Swope, Kenneth M. (2006), "Beyond Turtleboats: Siege Accounts from Hideyoshi's Second Invasion of Korea, 1597–1598", Sungkyun Journal of East Asian Studies, 6 (2): 177–206
- Swope, Kenneth M. (2005), "Crouching Tigers, Secret Weapons: Military Technology Employed During the Sino-Japanese-Korean War, 1592–1598", The Journal of Military History: 69, 11–42
- Swope, Kenneth M. (December 2002), "Deceit, Disguise, and Dependence: China, Japan, and the Future of the Tributary System, 1592–1596", The International History Review, 24 (4): 757–1008, doi:10.1080/07075332.2002.9640980, S2CID 154827808
- Swope, Kenneth M. (2009), A Dragon's Head and a Serpent's Tail: Ming China and the First Great East Asian War, 1592–1598, University of Oklahoma Press
- Turnbull, Stephen (1998), The Samurai Sourcebook, Cassell & Co., ISBN 1-85409-523-4
- Villiers, John (1980), SILK and Silver: Macau, Manila and Trade in the China Seas in the Sixteenth Century (A lecture delivered to the Hong Kong Branch of the Royal Asiatic Society at the Hong Kong Club. 10 June 1980) (PDF), The HKUL Digital Initiatives
- Yi, Min-woong (2004), Imjin Wae-ran Haejeonsa: The Naval Battles of the Imjin War [임진왜란 해전사], Chongoram Media [청어람미디어], ISBN 89-89722-49-7
