= Li Rubai =

Chinese general (1553–1619)

Li Rubai (李如柏) (1553–1619) was a general of the Ming dynasty. He was the younger brother of Li Rusong the son of Li Chengliang. He participated in the Imjin War and the campaign against the Later Jin Khan Nurhaci. Li Rubai committed suicide after the Later Jin defeated the Ming dynasty at the Battle of Sarhū.
