= Siege of Pyongyang (1592) =

1592 battle during the Japanese invasions of Korea

- Part of the Japanese invasions of Korea (1592–1598)
Date	19 July 1592 – 24 July 1592
Location	Pyeongyang 39°02′N 125°44′E
Result	Japanese victory

Belligerents
Toyotomi Japan	Kingdom of Joseon

Commanders and leaders
Konishi Yukinaga; Kuroda Nagamasa	Kim Myŏngwŏn; Yun Tusu

Strength
~20,000	10,000

Casualties and losses
?	?

The siege of Pyongyang was part of the Japanese invasions of Korea. Konishi Yukinaga, a Japanese daimyō, captured Pyongyang and garrisoned his force there in the winter of 1592.

== Background ==
Following the capture of Kaesong following the Battle of Imjin River, the Japanese invasion armies split up into three groups. Kuroda Nagamasa led his forces west into Hwanghae Province, and Kato Kiyomasa to the east into Hamgyong Province. The main force, under Konishi Yukinaga, proceeded north into Pyongan Province on 1 June. His vanguard reached the south bank of the Taedong River on 16 July within sight of the walls of Pyongyang. A few days later, he was joined by Kuroda Nagamasa's army, which had completed its sweep through Hwanghae Province without opposition. Unable to cross the river they waited there, sending a letter to King Seonjo urging his surrender. A parley mid-river led to no results.

King Seonjo fled Pyeongyang on 19 July and made his way to Yeongbyeon. Although the city had strong fortifications and was well supplied with troops and supplies, the departure of the king severely impacted the morale of the defenders, and the populace began to flee in panic. Korean General Kim Myŏngwŏn, together with government minister Yun Tusu and Minister of Interior Yi Won-ik, were left in charge of the defenses with nominally 10,000 men under their command.

== Battle ==
Rather than wait for the Japanese offensive, Kim decided to make a surprise night attack with a small contingent, after observing that Japanese camp security was lax at night. It took the Koreans longer to cross the river in darkness than anticipated, and the actual attack did not occur until near dawn. Initially successful, the Koreans managed to kill several hundred of the enemy before the Japanese realized what was happening. Kuroda Nagamasa counterattacked, pushing the Koreans back to the river. However, at the riverbank, the Korean army found that their boats were gone, the boatsmen having fled on hearing Japanese gunfire. Unable to escape across the river, the Koreans retreated upstream where the river was shallow enough to ford. This showed the Japanese how to ford the river to get to the city.

Realizing that the Japanese attack was coming, Kim had his remaining men sink their cannon and arms into a pond to prevent them from falling into the hands of the Japanese, and fled north to Sunan. The Japanese crossed the river on 24 July and found the city completely deserted. Suspecting a trap, Konishi and Kuroda sent scouts to a nearby hill to confirm before entering the empty city. Within the city's warehouses, they found seven thousand tons of rice, which would be enough to feed their army for several months.

== Aftermath ==
The Japanese occupation of Pyeongyang would not be contested until Ming general Zhao Chengxun arrived with 6,000 men on 23 August 1592.

== See also ==
- List of battles during the Japanese invasions of Korea (1592–1598)
- Siege of Pyongyang (1593)

== Bibliography ==
- Alagappa, Muthiah (2003), Asian Security Order: Instrumental and Normative Features, Stanford University Press, ISBN 978-0-8047-4629-8
- Arano, Yasunori (2005), The Formation of a Japanocentric World Order, International Journal of Asian Studies
- Brown, Delmer M. (May 1948), "The Impact of Firearms on Japanese Warfare, 1543–1598", The Far Eastern Quarterly, 7 (3): 236–53, doi:10.2307/2048846, JSTOR 2048846, S2CID 162924328
- Eikenberry, Karl W. (1988), "The Imjin War", Military Review, 68 (2): 74–82
- Ha, Tae-hung; Sohn, Pow-key (1977), 'Nanjung Ilgi: War Diary of Admiral Yi Sun-sin, Yonsei University Press, ISBN 978-89-7141-018-9
- Haboush, JaHyun Kim (2016), The Great East Asian War and the Birth of the Korean Nation
- Hawley, Samuel (2005), The Imjin War, The Royal Asiatic Society, Korea Branch/UC Berkeley Press, ISBN 978-89-954424-2-5
- Jang, Pyun-soon (1998), Noon-eu-ro Bo-nen Han-gook-yauk-sa 5: Gor-yeo Si-dae (눈으로 보는 한국역사 5: 고려시대), Park Doo-ui, Bae Keum-ram, Yi Sang-mi, Kim Ho-hyun, Kim Pyung-sook, et al., Joog-ang Gyo-yook-yaun-goo-won. 1998-10-30. Seoul, Korea.
- Kim, Ki-chung (Fall 1999), "Resistance, Abduction, and Survival: The Documentary Literature of the Imjin War (1592–8)", Korean Culture, 20 (3): 20–29
- Kim, Yung-sik (1998), "Problems and Possibilities in the Study of the History of Korean Science", Osiris, 2nd Series, 13: 48–79, doi:10.1086/649280, JSTOR 301878, S2CID 143724260
- 桑田忠親 [Kuwata, Tadachika], ed., 舊參謀本部編纂, [Kyu Sanbo Honbu], 朝鮮の役 [Chousen no Eki] (日本の戰史 [Nihon no Senshi] Vol. 5), 1965.
- Neves, Jaime Ramalhete (1994), "The Portuguese in the Im-Jim War?", Review of Culture, 18: 20–24
- Niderost, Eric (June 2001), "Turtleboat Destiny: The Imjin War and Yi Sun Shin", Military Heritage, 2 (6): 50–59, 89
- Niderost, Eric (January 2002), "The Miracle at Myongnyang, 1597", Osprey Military Journal, 4 (1): 44–50
- Park, Yune-hee (1973), Admiral Yi Sun-shin and His Turtleboat Armada: A Comprehensive Account of the Resistance of Korea to the 16th Century Japanese Invasion, Shinsaeng Press
- Rockstein, Edward D. (1993), Strategic And Operational Aspects of Japan's Invasions of Korea 1592–1598 1993-6-18, Naval War College
- Sadler, A. L. (June 1937), "The Naval Campaign in the Korean War of Hideyoshi (1592–1598)", Transactions of the Asiatic Society of Japan, Second Series, 14: 179–208
- Sansom, George (1961), A History of Japan 1334–1615, Stanford University Press, ISBN 978-0-8047-0525-7
- Sohn, Pow-key (April–June 1959), "Early Korean Painting", Journal of the American Oriental Society, 79 (2): 96–103, doi:10.2307/595851, JSTOR 595851
- Stramigioli, Giuliana (December 1954), "Hideyoshi's Expansionist Policy on the Asiatic Mainland", Transactions of the Asiatic Society of Japan, Third Series, 3: 74–116
- Strauss, Barry (Summer 2005), "Korea's Legendary Admiral", MHQ: The Quarterly Journal of Military History, 17 (4): 52–61
- Swope, Kenneth M. (2006), "Beyond Turtleboats: Siege Accounts from Hideyoshi's Second Invasion of Korea, 1597–1598", Sungkyun Journal of East Asian Studies, 6 (2): 177–206
- Swope, Kenneth M. (2005), "Crouching Tigers, Secret Weapons: Military Technology Employed During the Sino-Japanese-Korean War, 1592–1598", The Journal of Military History, 69: 11–42, doi:10.1353/jmh.2005.0059, S2CID 159829515
- Swope, Kenneth M. (December 2002), "Deceit, Disguise, and Dependence: China, Japan, and the Future of the Tributary System, 1592–1596", The International History Review, 24 (4): 757–1008, doi:10.1080/07075332.2002.9640980, S2CID 154827808
- Swope, Kenneth M. (2009), A Dragon's Head and a Serpent's Tail: Ming China and the First Great East Asian War, 1592–1598, University of Oklahoma Press
- Turnbull, Stephen (2002), Samurai Invasion: Japan's Korean War 1592–98, Cassell & Co, ISBN 978-0-304-35948-6
- Turnbull, Stephen (2008), The Samurai Invasion of Korea 1592-98, Osprey Publishing Ltd
- Turnbull, Stephen (1998), The Samurai Sourcebook, Cassell & Co, ISBN 978-1-85409-523-7
- Villiers, John (1980), SILK and Silver: Macau, Manila and Trade in the China Seas in the Sixteenth Century (A lecture delivered to the Hong Kong Branch of the Royal Asiatic Society at the Hong Kong Club. 10 June 1980). The HKUL Digital Initiatives
- Yi, Min-woong (2004), Imjin Wae-ran Haejeonsa: The Naval Battles of the Imjin War [임진왜란 해전사], Chongoram Media [청어람미디어], ISBN 978-89-89722-49-6
