= Battle of Sacheon (1598) =

Korean and Chinese siege against Japanese in 1598

- Part of the Japanese invasions of Korea (1592–1598)
Date	October 1598
Location	Sacheon, in today's South Gyeongsang province, South Korea
Result	Japanese victory

Belligerents
Japan	Ming; Joseon

Commanders and leaders
Shimazu Yoshihiro	Dong Yiyuan

Strength
8,000	Sources: Swope: 15,000+ Hawley: 26,800 Ming troops, 2,300 Joseon troops, 29,100 total Turnbull: 36,700 Japan: 200,000

Casualties and losses
Unknown	Sources: Korea: 7–8,000 Chinese soldiers killed Japan: 30,000–38,700

The Battle of Sacheon (泗川) was a siege by Korean and Chinese forces against the Japanese fortification of Sacheon from 28 to 29 September 1598, during Toyotomi Hideyoshi's invasions of Korea.

== Force numbers ==
There are various numbers given by different sources on the forces involved during the battle. Some Japanese sources provide exaggerated claims that 200,000 troops attacked Sacheon, but this would have represented all Ming-Joseon troops deployed in the entire war at the time. According to Stephen Turnbull, the Ming attacked Sacheon with a total of 36,700 troops. However, this is also an exaggeration according to Kenneth Swope, who believes that Turnbull inflated the numbers to justify the Shimazu claim that they killed 33,700 allied troops during the battle. Swope gives a total of more than 15,000 allied troops led by Dong Yiyuan, who attacked Sacheon. Samuel Hawley claims that Dong had 26,800 Ming troops under his command while Chong Ki-ryong led 2,300 Joseon troops for a total of 29,100 allied troops that attacked Sacheon. Hawley provides a figure of 8,000 Japanese troops defending Sacheon under the command of Shimazu Yoshihiro. Yoshihiro claims that his men killed 38,700 enemy troops in the battle, while two Korean accounts state that between 7,000 and 8,000 Chinese troops were killed, mostly while they were attempting to flee.

== Siege ==
Koreans and their Ming Chinese allies began pushing south in 1598, reclaiming territory lost to the Japanese in the battles of the preceding years. By September, an allied force of Ming soldiers under the command of Dong Yiyuan and Joseon soldiers led by Chong Ki-ryon was ready to lay siege to the newer, larger Sacheon castle.

The allied forces began their assault at midnight on 28 September. The old castle fell quickly at about 3:00 am on 29 September, and the Japanese split their force into three, retreated and sallied forth from the new castle's three gates. A massive fire suddenly erupted at the rear of the besiegers and sent them into chaos. The Japanese stormed forth and defeated them. The attacking army suffered heavy casualties, although the exact number is disputed.

== Bibliography ==
- Hawley, Samuel (2005). The Imjin War. The Royal Asiatic Society, Korea Branch/UC Berkeley Press. ISBN 89-954424-2-5.
- Swope, Kenneth M. (2009). A Dragon's Head and a Serpent's Tail: Ming China and the First Great East Asian War, 1592–1598. University of Oklahoma Press.
- Turnbull, Stephen (2002). Samurai Invasion: Japan's Korean War 1592–98. Cassell & Co. ISBN 0-304-35948-3.
