= Ma Gui (general) =

Ma Gui (1543–1617) (simplified Chinese: 麻贵; traditional Chinese: 麻貴; pinyin: Má Guì; Wade–Giles: Ma^{2} Kui^{4}) was the general of the armies of the Ming Dynasty between 1589 and 1610. A member of the Hui minority of China, he served the Han rulers with great loyalty. He participated in various campaigns against the Mongols in his career, and serving with great distinction, he led Ming force in the second Japanese Invasions of Korea his final position was the commander of Liaodong Peninsula.

Also, Ma Gui was the founder of a Korean clan, the Shanggu Ma clan.

== Sources ==
- History of the Ming chapter 238
