= Song Yingchang =

Administrative official of the Ming-dynasty

Song Yingchang (traditional Chinese: 宋應昌; simplified Chinese: 宋应昌; pinyin: Sòng Yìngchāng; 1536－1606) was an administrative official during the Ming dynasty, most famously known for managing the first Ming campaign of the Imjin War during 1592-1593.

== Career ==
Song entered public service in 1565, during his career he held posts such as the governor of Jiangzhou (絳州知府), vice chief inspector (副都御史), Overseer of Shandong province (巡撫山東) and the Overseer of the imperial guards (籌建營衛巡司) .

In late August 1592, he was appointed Vice Minister of Defense, when the decision was made for the Ming forces to fully commit into Korea, he also took the position as the chief manager for this task, so his full title was "Vice premier of the department of military and chief administrator of military affairs against Japanese force" (兵部右侍郎經略備倭軍務)

Song made extensive preparation from September to December 1592, gathering military forces from across China and securing supplies and equipment. The expedition would eventually be led by general Li Rusong and would set out on 12/25 (lunar calendar) 1592 from Liaodong province with an army of 36,000, Song would stay behind as the Ming forces managed to retake Pyongyang in the siege of Pyongyang within 2 weeks of setting out, Kaesong a couple weeks later, and Seoul by March 1593, it was a staggering success as the Ming forces managed to retake the 3 largest cities in Korea in short periods with a much smaller army than the Japanese forces.

After retaking Seoul, the Japanese forces began to enter into negotiation with the Ming dynasty in earnest, the negotiation was headed by Konishi Yukinaga on the Japanese side and Shen Weijing (沈惟敬) on the Ming side. Song was ambiguous towards the negotiation though generally landed on the opposing side more often than not, this along with the various disputes he got into with his boss, the Minister of Defense (兵部尚書) Shi Xing (石星) who was the chief proponent of the peace talks, and some of the controversies of the Ming military during the war (most notably some of the faction dispute of the Ming generals from different garrisons and backgrounds), made Song resign from his post and retire from public service, he spent the remainder of his life back in his home province of Hangzhou (modern day Zhejiang province, by the West Lake ( Xi Hu ).

Song compiled a good number of his letters wrote during the 1592-1593 span, into the work "The collection of the management of the restoration" (經略復國要編). which is one of the best first hand source on the Imjin War from the Ming perspective. The letters involve the various logistic works, and some of the battle plans and letters to both Korean and Japanese leaders of the time. Song Yingchang was described as an imposing looking man with square face and dark-bluish beard.

== Sources ==
- History of Ming (明史)
- The History of the county of XiaoXing, biographies . (紹興縣誌 人物列傳)
- 經略復國要編 宋應昌 著
