= Li Rusong =

Chinese general (1549–1598)

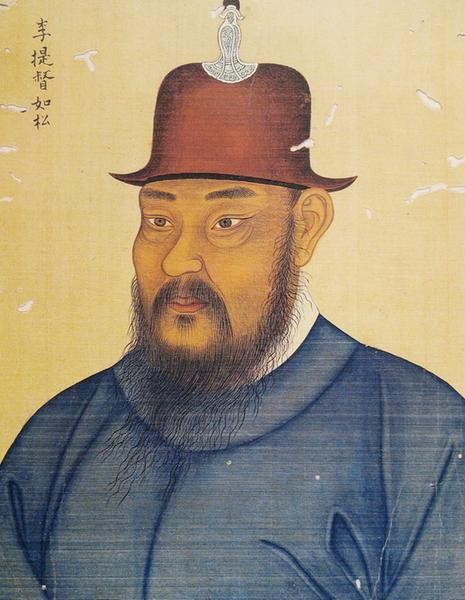
- Chinese: 李如松
Transcriptions
Standard Mandarin
- Hanyu Pinyin: Lǐ Rúsòng

Zimao (courtesy name)
- Chinese: 子茂
Transcriptions
Standard Mandarin
- Hanyu Pinyin: Zǐmào

Zhonglie (posthumous name)
- Chinese: 忠烈
Transcriptions
Standard Mandarin
- Hanyu Pinyin: Zhōngliè

Li Rusong (1549–1598) was a Chinese general of Korean descent from Tieling, Liaodong during the Ming Dynasty. He was a Ming army commander in the first half of the Imjin War that took place in the Korean Peninsula. Upon the request of the Korean King Seonjo of Joseon, Wanli Emperor of Ming sent reinforcements to support the Korean military in its war effort against the Japanese invasion masterminded by Toyotomi Hideyoshi.

His father, Li Chengliang, was also a Ming general, who defended Liaodong from the Jurchens. According to the Annals of King Seonjo of the Veritable Records of the Joseon Dynasty, Li Rusong's 5th generation ancestor Li Ying (李英, Yi Yeong) was a distant relative of Yi Jonyeon (李兆年, 이조년) and a member of the Seongju Yi clan of Goryeo that fled to Liaodong after committing murder.

Li Rusong was ultimately captured and executed when the Mongols invaded Liaodong.

== Military career ==
Li Rusong first rose to fame in early 1592, when he managed to defeat a major rebellion at Ningxia. The Ming army had been unable to move the rebels holed up in the city for the first six months, but after Li arrived the city fell within three months. Li was able to divert the waters of the Yellow River directly into the city, which led to its fall. He was immediately appointed the chief general of the expedition into Korea after this; he led a force of some 36,000 into Korea in the last few days of 1592. Together with Ming administrator Song Yingchang, Li Rusong was generally successful in Korea, first retaking the city of Pyongyang in a direct assault within two weeks of setting off (on January 8 of 1593), and then took back the city of Kaesong a couple week later. As he marched south towards the Korean capital of Hanyang (漢陽) in later January, the Ming army clashed with the Japanese forces in the Battle of Byeokjegwan, which resulted in the Ming army being pushed back briefly. Within two months after this he succeeded in recapturing Hanyang. He ordered Chinese and Korean troops to refrain from killing all Japanese soldiers and grant them the right to retreat.

== Sword ==
Li knew of the sword art jedok geom during his stay in Korea. The Koreans published the sword-style in their martial arts manuals called Muyesinbo (1759) and Muyedobotongji (1791).

== Death ==
In April 1598, the Mongols invaded the Ming province of Liaodong from the north when Li Rusong was leading a small scouting group around its forests. Surrounded by thousands of Mongol cavalry, he could not escape, and was captured and subsequently killed. He was posthumously given the title of Zhonglie (忠烈, Lord of Fidelity).

Descendants

During his dispatch to Joseon, Li Rusong lived with a Korean woman who belonged to the Bonghwa Geum (봉화 금씨, 奉化琴氏) clan. A few months after Li Rusong returned to Ming, a son was born, and he was named Yi Cheon-geun (李天根, Li Tiangen). When the Qing dynasty demanded the repatriation of Ming refugees, he hid on Geoje Island, and his descendants still live in Jangseungpo, Geoje in present times. Meanwhile, the grandsons of Li Rusong and of his younger brother Li Rumei later also settled in Joseon following the fall of the Ming Dynasty, and their descendants are known as the Nongseo Yi clan (농서 이씨, 農書李氏).

== See also ==
- Ming dynasty
- Yi Sun-sin
- Deng Zilong
