= Joseon Infantry Division =

Joseon Infantry Division 조선보병대 朝鮮步兵隊
- Active: 1907
- Disbanded: April 8, 1931
- Country: Korean Empire; Empire of Japan
- Allegiance: House of Yi
- Branch: Army
- Type: Imperial guard
- Role: Bodyguard; Force protection Hand-to-hand combat
- Size: 837
- Garrison/HQ: Chongmudang; Cheongheondang

The Joseon Infantry Division (Korean: 조선보병대) was an Imperial Guard Infantry established after the disbandment of the Imperial Korean Armed Forces to protect the Five Grand Palaces and members of the House of Yi. They had very little to do apart from serving as sentries, as they were mainly a ceremonial unit guarding the old palaces.

At the time, articles about "the world's only peace army" were often published in daily newspapers. Their role was insignificant to Japan's Colonial Rule as Japan left the battalion-level Joseon infantry and company-level Joseon cavalry as a royal guard to prevent Korean soldiers in Hanseong, who had become unemployed, from joining the "righteous army", and to protect and monitor Emperors Gojong and Sunjong.

== Background ==
After Japan's victory in the Russo-Japanese War in 1905, the Japanese forced the Korean ministers to sign the Japan–Korea Treaty of 1905. As per the treaty, the Korean government disbanded the Navy and reduced the numbers of the Imperial Army's City Guards and the Garrison Guards. The total number of Garrison Guards was less than 3,000. Their ships, such as the Guangjae, transported coal from 1941 until Korea's independence from Japan.

On July 31, 1907, when the struggle for national sovereignty was at its peak, the newly enthroned emperor issued a decree regarding the dissolution of the military. As a result, many generals dispersed instantly, and the Korean Empire became a "powerless" country. The army disbanded on August 1, 1907, as per the Japan–Korea Treaty of 1907. From midnight, it rained in Seoul. There was an order to gather in Namdaemun. In Namdaemun, Major Park Seung-hwan committed suicide out of guilt for not protecting the country. His death incited the Korean Army to loot their armories, which the Japanese confiscated earlier, and fight against the Japanese army, beginning the Battle of Namdaemun. Still, the Japanese anticipated this and suppressed them after nearly four hours of fighting, in which 13 officers and 57 enlisted were killed. On August 30, 1907, many officers were removed from their positions. Emperor Sunjong incorporated the remaining soldiers into the Imperial Retinue Guard, which continued even after the annexation in 1910. After disbanding the central army in 1907, the provincial armies gradually separated. As a result, the provincial soldiers joined the Righteous Armies before the disbandment.

However, amidst this situation, traces of the Korean military remained, mainly as the Imperial Guard (근위대). It was an attempt to "select those necessary for protecting the royal court" during the temporary dissolution of the military. The remaining Imperial Guard consisted of one battalion, with the Guards Infantry responsible for guarding the palace and the Guards Cavalry overseeing the duties of the palace's commander. After the dissolution, some cadets who studied abroad returned to Korea, and served under tight Japanese intervention and served under the Chosun Infantry. This organization remained the same even after entering colonial rule. Just as the royal family, known as the Yi Family, was preserved despite the country's downfall, these units retained their existence, though their names were changed to Joseon Infantry Division and Joseon Cavalry Division.

== Activities ==
When the military was disbanded, unlike other units that resisted with weapons, this unit complied with the Japanese order, becoming the core unit responsible for guarding the Korean royal family and performing ceremonial duties. From the beginning, it was a military unit that was far removed from national consciousness and combat readiness.

During the Japanese colonial rule, an army was created immediately after the Japanese Empire disbanded the Korean Empire in 1907 to protect the imperial family and calm the complaints of retired soldiers. The Joseon infantry patrols the streets of Gwanghwamun in the morning, a specialty of Hanseong, along with memories of the old army. The Japanese authorities coveted the location of the Joseon Infantry Division. They wanted to evict the Joseon Infantry Division, which occupied the best site (the current location of the government office) in front of Gwanghwamun, the former Yukjo (六曺) Street. There were constant suggestions to relocate the Joseon Infantry Division, which would often drink in the streets of downtown and cause conflicts with the locals.

The Joseon Infantry Division functioned as a subordinate organization under Japanese colonial rule. During the March 1st Movement in 1919, they blocked the crowds pushing towards Changdeokgung Palace. Although it also caused numerous grievances, it produced many independence activists. Jang Jin-hong, who committed suicide shortly before his execution after receiving a death sentence for the bombing at the Daegu Branch of the Bank of Chōsen and Yang Geun-hwan, who was executed by beheading for assassinating a pro-Japanese official in 1921, were both former soldiers of the Joseon Infantry Division.

As a result, there are several traces of attempts by the Japanese Governor-General of Chōsen to relocate the Joseon Infantry Division elsewhere. Particularly, as the completion of the newly constructed Japanese General Government Building inside Gyeongbokgung Palace approached, these movements were openly taking place.

For example, an article titled "The Relocation of the Joseon Infantry Division, Increased Security Compared to Last Year" is preserved in the March 29, 1925 issue of the Maeil Shinbo newspaper. It states the following: "The Joseon Infantry Division has decided to relocate to another place due to the destruction of the Government-General Annex in Gyeongbokgung Palace, and it is currently selecting a new site. The original purpose of the division was to protect the royal family, so it was considering a location near Changdeokgung Palace, but it has not yet made a decision. The vacant land within Seosomun seems to be the most promising option."

However, this plan was not immediately implemented. At least until that time, it was a period when the 'former' emperor they were supposed to protect was still alive. It is unclear whether this was the reason, but in any case, the Joseon Infantry Division remained in its place.

== Organization ==
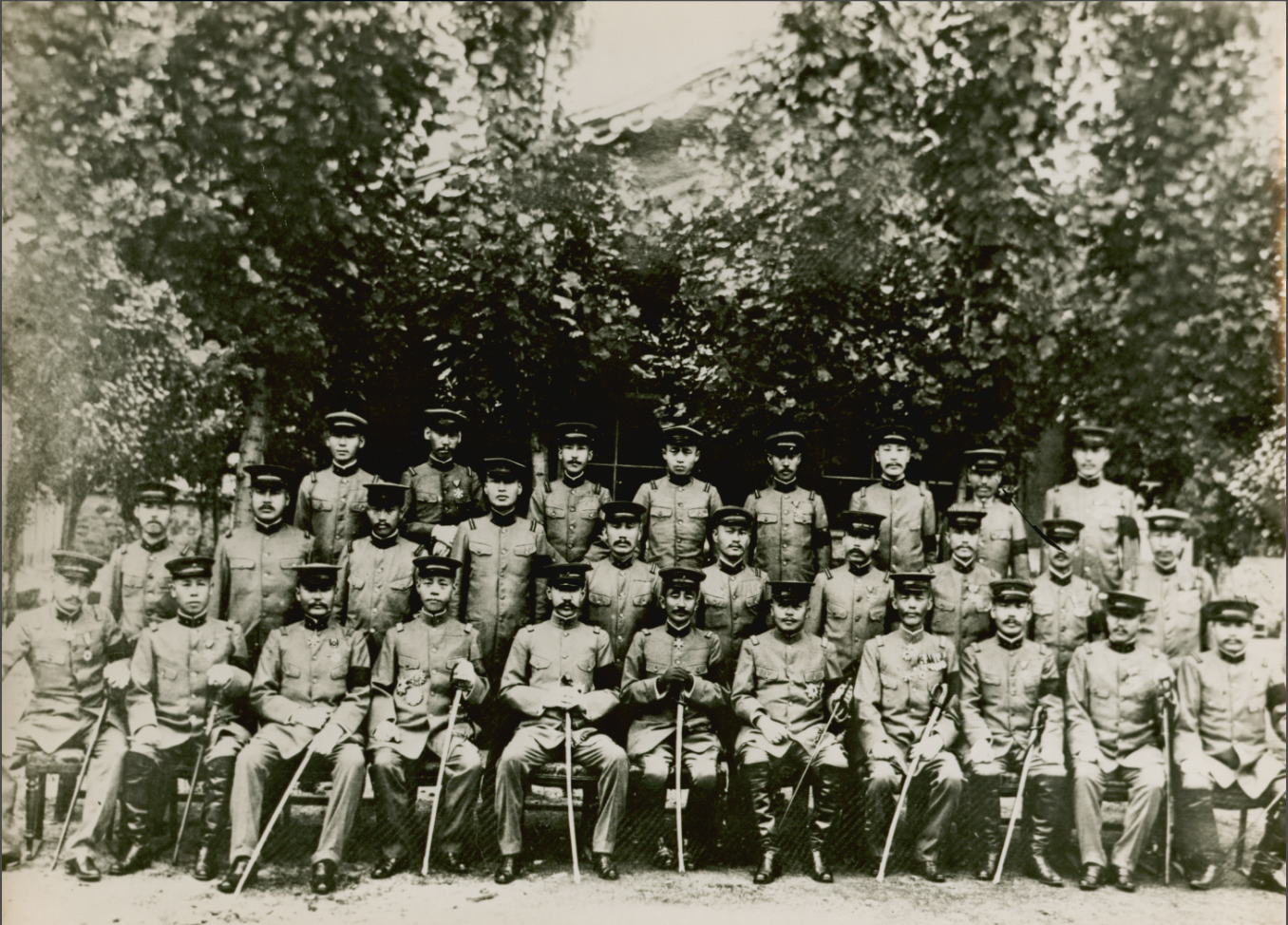
Officers of Choseon Infantry Division

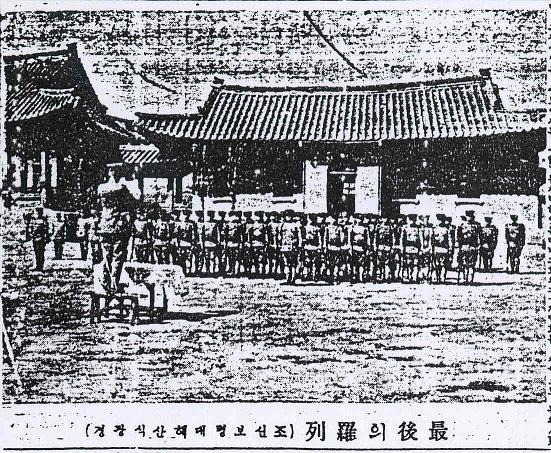
Korean Infantry Division in Formation

After the Japanese dissolved the Korean Empire's military in 1907, the Chosun Infantry Division remained in the area of Seoul (then known as Keijō) for 33 years. Although most people perceive it this way, it was a unit composed entirely of Korean officers and soldiers funded by the colonial administration.

At its inception, the Joseon Infantry Division had 837 personnel. It consisted of a Royal Guard Infantry Battalion with 644 members, a Royal Guard Cavalry Battalion with 92 members, and supporting institutions such as a non-commissioned officers' school and various administrative offices. The main force was the 2nd Battalion of the former Korean Empire's military. After the annexation by Japan in 1910, the unit's strength further diminished. The term "Royal Guard" (근위) was removed from the unit's name, which previously indicated protection of the emperor or king from a close distance. The Joseon Cavalry Division, which was at the battalion level, quietly disappeared around 1913. The reason for the disappearance of the cavalry unit was primarily due to the high cost. Following the death of Emperor Gojong in 1919, the size of the Joseon Infantry Division was reduced from a battalion to a company. There were only two lieutenant generals. The number of excessive generals compared to soldiers is always the same.

Originally, after the merger, the cavalry and infantry divisions were established to maintain the dignity of the royal palaces. However, shortly after the merger, the cavalry division was disbanded. Consequently, any plans for the relocation of the infantry division (estimated cost of 400,000 yen) that were being considered have naturally fallen through.

=== Requirements ===
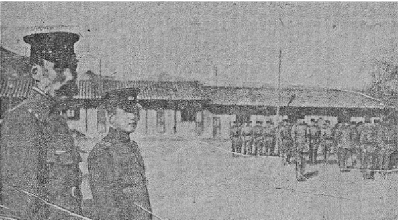
"Prince Yeongchin (이은) and Matsukawa Toshitane (마쓰카와 도시타네), the Commander of the Japanese Korean Army, inspecting the training of the Joseon Infantry Division.

Although a small force, the Joseon Infantry Division recruits 50 to 80 new soldiers yearly. It was a time when there were no jobs of this kind, so there was a 10 to 1 competition to recruit soldiers. Although it was a highly educated army composed of graduates of ordinary schools or higher. According to an article published in the Dong-a Ilbo, a nationalist daily newspaper, in 1924: "The Chosun Infantry Division, where around 280 officers and soldiers are stationed, is recruiting about 80 new soldiers. The term of service is two years, and the qualifications are as follows: height of at least 5 feet 2 inches (approximately 158 cm), age between 18 and 30, and completion of an ordinary school education or equivalent.

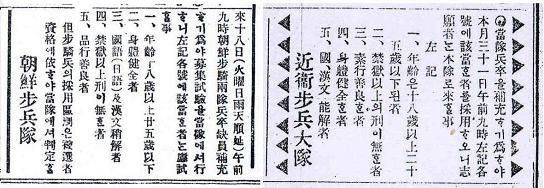
A ‘Soldier Recruitment Announcement, made during the Guards Infantry Division (1909) and the Joseon Infantry Division (1911).

They had dwindled to 200-250 members, barely maintaining their presence. The departure of the 'Emperor Gojong,' who could be considered their raison d'être, played a role in this decline. Furthermore, the situation was changing again with the recent passing of the Emperor Sunjong. The Dong-a Ilbo newspaper, in its May 19, 1926 issue, depicted the grim scene of the Joseon Infantry Division as follows: "Since the dissolution of the Korean military in the year of Eulsa, the existence of the Joseon Infantry Division remains as a reminder to young citizens who are unaware of the past that there was once a military in Joseon. Their presence is no longer necessary. Discussions are underway between the government general and the military headquarters to reduce the current single battalion to a company of 50 members.

=== Equipment ===
Although the infantry division is equipped with uniforms, they carry unnecessary guns for combat and wear swords. The Joseon Infantry was a military unit that could not shoot guns.

== Salary ==
The monthly salary for privates is 14 won, and room and board are provided. During a time when the monthly salary was 20 won, and there were no suitable occupations other than farming for those with average education, there was fierce competition for recruitment, with a ratio of 7 to 10 applicants per spot. They kept it alive to appease the imperial family and retired soldiers' dissatisfaction, but the problem was the cost. Maintaining the Joseon Infantry Division cost around 200,000 won per year. Apart from the late Japanese colonial period, the division did not recruit Korean officers, so the officers of the Joseon Infantry Division were older and held higher ranks, resulting in higher salaries. In 1925, the salary breakdown included one lieutenant general, three colonels, three lieutenant colonels, four majors, three captains, two first lieutenants, two-second lieutenants, one non-commissioned officer of special duty, one warrant officer, 14 sergeants, and seven corporals. The enlisted soldiers were 28 first-class privates, 167 second-class privates, and 100 third-class privates.

== Decline ==
As the Joseon Infantry Division, they lacked immediate tasks and faced increasingly difficult economic conditions, experiencing a severe recession in various aspects. However, one interesting point was that as the recession deepened, the popularity of the Joseon Infantry Division itself skyrocketed. The officials were caught up in a wave of financial constraints and salary reductions, and the situation became increasingly difficult, with many students unable to pay their tuition fees and dropping out midway. Even the elite who graduated from Keijō Imperial University struggled to find stable employment during those turbulent times.

=== Great Depression ===
The era of the Great Depression was fast approaching, which was a decisive factor. Unemployment was a major issue for everyone. Given the circumstances, the Joseon Infantry Division, which guaranteed a minimum two-year term of service for young Koreans, was seen as a stable and attractive job. An article titled 'Unusual Phenomenon of Increasing Applicants in Recent Years' was published in the Maeil Shinbo newspaper on February 14, 1930.

"The story of how extreme rural decline turned some rural youth into urban longing patients! Every year, the Joseon Infantry Division recruits 70 to 80 new soldiers from all over Korea for two years of military training. As the enlistment period for new soldiers drew closer this year, the recruitment advertisement exceeded the recruitment quota of 800 people tenfold, so we had to send notices to various provincial military headquarters by the end of January. The applicants were mostly young people from mountainous villages in Hamgyeong and Pyeongbuk and other rural areas. Although they received some education at regular schools or other educational institutions, they were considered relatively educated youth in rural areas. As the rural decline worsened, their lives became increasingly difficult, and they were reluctant to become middle-aged rural youth engaged in the great rural development project. For some reason, they longed for urban life or a pathological desire to experience urban life. (Omitted) On the other hand, the soldiers who had completed their two-year service were reluctant to leave Seoul, thinking that only hardships awaited them if they returned to their hometowns. They predicted that there would be nothing but difficulties in their lives, and they thought that military life, where at least their daily necessities were guaranteed, was better. Many soldiers extended their service period for one or two years. Accordingly, the recruitment of new soldiers this year is expected to decrease slightly compared to previous years."

— 'Unusual Phenomenon of Increasing Applicants in Recent Years,' Maeil Shinbo newspaper, February 14, 1930.

However, even if a young person managed to be recruited into the Joseon Infantry Division, breaking through fierce competition then, they did not have the opportunity to complete the full two-year term of service.

Since the abdication of Emperor Sunjong in 1926, such discussions increased. As there was no longer a need to guard the palaces in Korea, it was proposed to abolish or downsize the Korean Infantry Division to a smaller unit. At the end of 1930, a decision was made. This coincided with the global Great Depression triggered by the significant stock market crash in New York in 1929. Without hesitation, the Japanese authorities disbanded the Korean Infantry Division. The citizens observed the disbandment of the Korean Infantry Division with mixed feelings. A sense of regret can be felt in a part of an article published in Dong-a Ilbo on November 9, 1930.

"The peaceful army, the Korean Infantry Division, which had guns but never harmed people, and had ammunition cases but no bullets, will be disbanded... (omitted)... As the remains of Korean soldiers disappear from Korea and can only be found in foreign countries, should we shout 'Hurray' for the last closing of the peaceful army?"

— Dong-a Ilbo article, November 9, 1930.

== Disbandment ==
The decision to disband the Joseon Infantry Division was announced in January 1931. As colonial rulers, they faced the aftermath of the worldwide Great Depression, leading to personnel reductions, organizational downsizing, salary cuts, and other difficulties. Given the challenging situation they were already dealing with, they had no reason to maintain the Joseon Infantry Division, which was like an unnecessary burden.

Having carried the legacy of the Korean military, the Joseon Infantry Division concluded its poignant journey that lasted for over 20 years with a dissolution ceremony on April 8, 1931. On April 8, 1931, at 10 a.m., a group of about 200 troops held a disbandment ceremony the current government at Gukyo Street, Gwanghwamun, Seoul. Most people are surprised at the mention of a "Korean military" during the Japanese colonial period. The Korean Empire's military was forcibly disbanded in 1907, and it was not until 1938 that the Japanese allowed Koreans to join the Japanese military. So, it is questionable whether there was a Korean unit in Seoul in 1931, unless it was an anti-Japanese independence army in Manchuria.

It is said that the citizens, above all, missed the sound of the morning bugle. The soldiers of the disbanded Korean Infantry Division, who used to start their daily routines at 7:30 a.m. to the sound of the bugle, suddenly became unemployed and took up positions as prisoners, penal officers, or assistant managers at the Keijō Electric Company. Interestingly, at the time of disbandment, 202 junior soldiers, two senior officers, and six senior non-commissioned officers were in the miniaturized army. After the disbandment, Kim Eung-seon, a senior officer, was recognized by the Japanese and promoted to colonel in the Imperial Japanese Army. He received a special gratuity of 2,970 yen, a particular retirement gratitude payment, and allowances totaling 8,926 won.

=== Fate of the former soldiers ===
Shortly thereafter, the commanding officers of the Joseon Infantry Division, who had aligned themselves with the Japanese army, were promoted and concurrently assigned to the Korean military headquarters.

Almost half of them had already returned to their hometowns along with their discharge, leaving behind only a few unemployed individuals. Various arrangements were made for them in different positions considering their unfavorable circumstances during the recession. Unemployed soldiers were specially hired as police or military police assistants. Some became executioners, prison guards, or tank commanders. In particular, around 50 individuals were recruited as executioners at Changdeokgung Palace Police Station, and it was reported that some were appointed as local executioners.

== Legacy ==
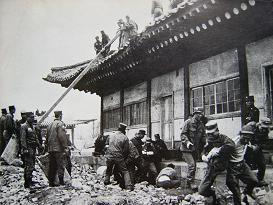
Cheongheondang, the last vestige of the Joseon Infantry, was dismantled in April 1967 and moved to the Military Academy due to the construction of the General Government Complex.

The division, which had even the slightest traces of Joseon, was transformed into the main body of the Japanese Empire.

Another predatory organization took over the Joseon Infantry Headquarters. The Inspection Department and the Insurance Operations Department of the Cheshin Nation Life Insurance Company moved into the location across from Gwanghwamun, constructing a new building with a budget of 260,000 won. The Japanese forcibly introduced the Cheshin Simplified Life Insurance from the new building. Until the fall of the Japanese Empire, about 11 million simple life insurance policies were sold semi-forcibly, mostly paid by ordinary citizens. The insurance company was in business until the collapse of the Japanese Empire. Under the agreement reached during the normalization of diplomatic relations between South Korea and Japan in 1965, the Cheshin Simplified Life Insurance was granted the site of the Korean Infantry Division.

Cheongheondang, a Korean-style building used by the Joseon Infantry, was moved to Taereung Military Academy when the Government Complex was built in 1967. Today, the Government Complex Seoul is located on the site where the Joseon Infantry Division once stood. The presence of the Joseon Infantry Division evokes a sense of nostalgia for the once numerous Korean military that has disappeared.

== See also ==
- Imperial Korean Armed Forces
- Imperial Army of Japan
- House of Yi
- Korean Empire
- Empire of Japan
  - Korea under Japanese rule
- Korean Independence Movement
- March 1st Movement

== External References ==
- 박, 완 (2018). "3.1운동 전후 조선인의 군사적 이용에 관한 일본 육군 내 논의✽✽✽" (PDF) (in Korean). Seoul National University.
