= Battle of Ichi =

1592 battle of the Imjin War

- Part of Imjin War
Date	August 14, 1592 (Gregorian Calendar); July 8, 1592 (Lunar calendar)
Location	Geumsan, Joseon
Result	Joseon victory

Belligerents
Japan	Joseon

Commanders and leaders
Kobayakawa Takakage	Kwŏn Yul; Hwang Jin

Strength
15,000	1,500

Casualties and losses
Unknown	Unknown

- Korean name
- Hangul: 이치 전투
- Hanja: 梨峙戰鬪
- RR: Ichi jeontu
- MR: Ich'i chŏnt'u

The Battle of Ichi was fought on August 14, 1592, in Jeolla Province during the Japanese invasions of Korea. Kwŏn Yul and Hwang Jin's one-thousand-man army battled against the fifteen thousand strong army of Kobayakawa Takakage. The Koreans won this battle and stopped the Japanese army from advancing to Jeolla Province.

== Background ==
Toyotomi Hideyoshi made an order to Kobayakawa Takakage to attack the Jeolla Province. Jeolla Province was famous for its rice, and Japan needed that rice to feed their army. Also, Admiral Yi Sun-sin's naval force was stationed in Jeolla Province. Capturing Jeolla Province would provide a land route for the Japanese army to attack Admiral Yi’s base in Yosu, who had interfered with Japanese supply lines for the past two months. So Kobayakawa, who was in Seoul at the time, advanced to attack the Korean army.

== Flow of the battle ==
Japanese army needed to go from Geumsan County to Jeonju to capture the province. There were two paths that the Japanese could take. One path was blocked by a hill called Ungchi and the other was blocked by Ichi hill. The Japanese split their forces and so did the Koreans. So the battle for Ichi and Ungchi happened at the same time. At the same time, Ko Kyŏngmyŏng was advancing to Geumsan to try to trap the Japanese. Although force at Ichi were winning by the 8th, Korean force at Ungchi routed to Jeonju at that time and the Japanese force advanced to Jeonju by that path. However, later on, Japanese force retreated from Ichi and Jeonju. Ko Kyŏngmyŏng's force arrived and attacked the Japanese rear. As a result, Japan failed to provide enough rice for its army, which affected its ability to fight.

== Aftermath ==
Though the battle had been historically neglected and not well known, Korean historians in modern times note the strategic importance of the battle of Ichi, labeling it as a decisive victory. Professor Ha Tae-gyu explained, “As the war became protracted, the Japanese army planned to procure the insufficient military provisions and supplies from Jeolla Province...the occupation of Jeolla Province failed due to the Battle of Ungchi and Ichi.” As a result of this battle, Japanese supply lines faltered and the Japanese forces were forced to retreat from Pyongyang and Hamgyeong Provinces.

Professor Noh Young-gu of the Department of Military Strategy at the National Defense University agreed and noted the battle "also had the effect of blocking the Japanese army’s attempt to capture the Joseon navy’s stronghold by capturing Geumsan" which enabled Joseon naval superiority. Noh made the point that the Japanese failure to seize Jeolla prevented disaster for Joseon.
