= Huang Jin =

Huang Jin may refer to:

- Huang Jin (jurist) (Chinese: 黄进, born 1958), a Chinese jurist, scholar of international law, and higher education administrator
- Hwang Jin (Chinese: 黄进, 1550–1593), a general during the Japanese invasions of Korea
- Wong Chun (Chinese: 黄进), a Hong Kong director and screenwriter
