= Yun Hui-sun =

Korean independence activist (1860–1935)

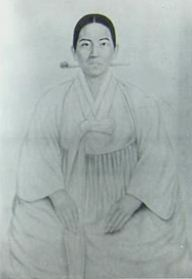
- Born: 1860; Seoul
- Died: 1935 (aged 74–75)
- Occupations: Militia leader, composer of battle songs
- Years active: 1895–1935
- Known for: Creating and leading the first female Korean militia group
- Notable work: Song of the Women's Militia
- Spouse: Yu Jae-won
- Children: One
- Honours: Presidential medal of citation

Yun Hui-sun, also known as Yoon Hee-Soon (Korean: 윤희순; Hanja: 尹熙順; August 11, 1860 – August 1, 1935), was a Korean militia leader and organizer, known for her work opposing Japanese colonial rule of Korea. After the Japanese assassination of Korean Empress Myeongseong caused national unrest in 1895, Yun began supporting Korean militia troops, also known as righteous armies. Yun sent threats and declarations of war to Japanese army commanders and Korean soldiers who served Japan; actively promoted the cause of Korean independence among women; and composed dozens of nationalistic battle songs. Her battle song Ansaram euibyeong ga (Song of the Women's Militia) was the first Korean militia song composed by a woman and the first militia song written down in the Korean language. In 1907, Yun created and led the first all-woman righteous army, training her militia in fighting techniques herself. She continued supporting Korea's fight for independence until her death.

The South Korean government posthumously awarded Yun a presidential medal of citation and the National Medal of Order of Merit for National Foundation.

== Early life ==
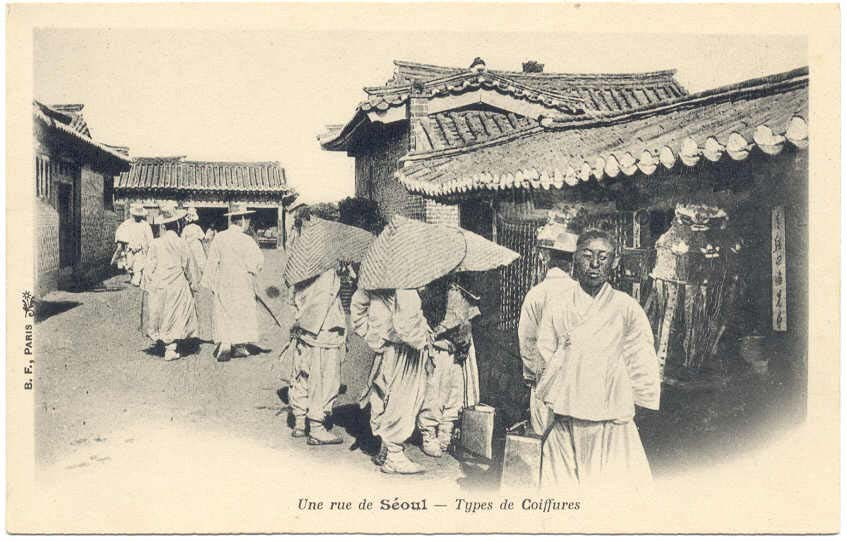
19th-century Seoul, Korea

Yun Hui-sun was born in 1860 in Seoul. Her father was Yun Ik-sang, and their ancestors had come from Haeju. Yun was known for both her high spirits and her devotion to her family.

When Yun was 16, she married Yu Jae-won, the son of militia commander Yu Hong-seok, and the couple lived in Nammyon, Chunche. Yun and Yu Jae-won had a son named Yu Don-sang.

== Military involvement ==
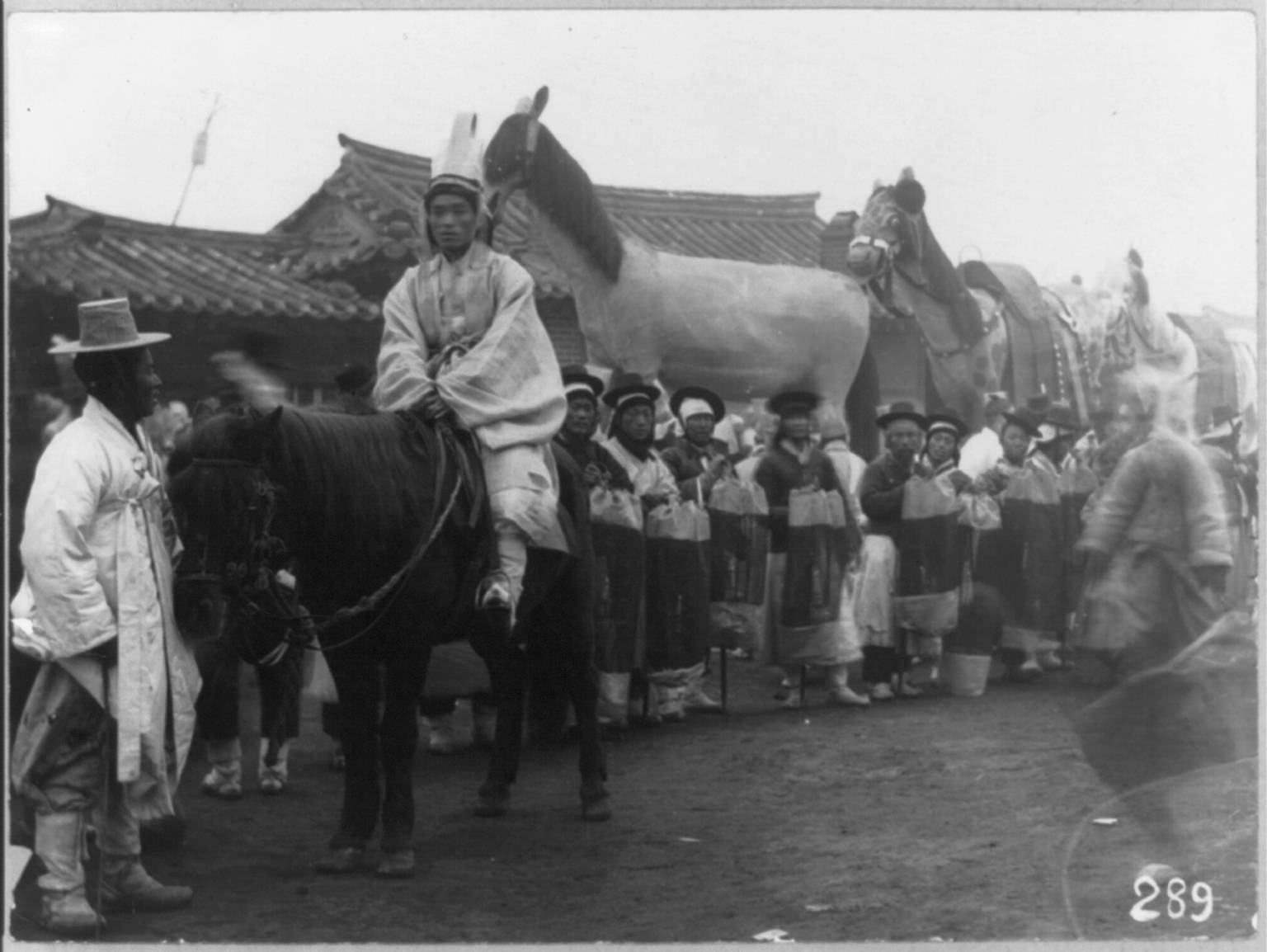
Funeral procession for the assassinated Empress Myeongseong (c. 1890s)

In 1895, the Japanese assassination of Korean Empress Myeongseong ignited public unrest across Korea, and Yun's father-in-law prepared his militia for war. Violent conflict began between Korean and Japanese soldiers. Although Yun pleaded to join the fight, her father-in-law refused permission. Yun was left at home. Instead of being content with household chores, however, Yun sent written declarations of war to Japanese army commanders, and wrote threatening letters to Korean soldiers who had chosen to serve the Japanese. She encouraged other women to support Korea's total independence from Japan. Yun also composed dozens of songs for Korean militia troops, nine of which are still known today.

One of Yun's battle songs, Ansaram euibyeong ga (Song of the Women's Militia), was the first Korean militia song composed by a woman and the first militia song written down in the Korean language:

However strong and prosperous / the Japanese may be, / If united, we can defeat them easily. / Let the world say we are mere women, / But how can we not know love for the country, / Without a country, any use for man or woman? / Let us march out to join the righteous army, / Let us help our militia troops, / If they are seized by beasts, / Would the Japanese ever save them? / Let us help our militia troops. / Success for us, hurrah for our nation! / Ten thousand hurrahs for women!

In 1907, Yun created a militia of women – Korea's first female righteous army. The militia consisted of about 30 women. Yun raised funds to support Korean troops and organized the installation of a weapons factory in Jusan, Yeouinaegol.

In 1911, after the Japanese began occupying Korea, Yun's father-in-law Yu Hong-seok left Korea and travelled to southern Manchuria in order to regroup with his soldiers and develop a new military strategy. Before Yun and her son could follow, they were arrested and threatened by Japanese police, who demanded to know the whereabouts of Yu Hong-seok. Yun refused to reveal any information, and the Japanese finally left them alone, impressed by her fortitude.

Between 1913 and 1915, Yun lost both her husband and father-in-law; her husband had been arrested and tortured by Japanese police. Yun continued to train her militia women and led them in attacks on Japanese camps. She encouraged both male and female militia groups to work together and become more effective. Freeing Korean prisoners from Japanese camps, Yun hid them in secret caves and helped them survive. Later in her life, she founded a school and trained new independence fighters.

== Death and legacy ==
Yun died in the summer of 1935, eleven days after her son had died in the custody of the Japanese. She bequeathed a document to her descendants entitled Ilsaengnok (A Record of my Life).

After her death, Yun's actions were posthumously honoured by the South Korean government. She was awarded a presidential medal of citation and the National Medal of Order of Merit for National Foundation. On October 20, 1994, the South Korean government arranged for Yun's and her husband's remains to be returned and buried at the burial site of Yun's ancestors.
