= Kim Ch'ŏnil =

Korean military leader (1537–1593)

Kim Ch'ŏnil 김천일

Personal details
- Born: 1537
- Died: 27th day, 7th month of 1593 (aged 55–56)
- Occupation: Official and General

Korean name
- Hangul: 김천일
- Hanja: 金千鎰
- RR: Gim Cheonil
- MR: Kim Ch'ŏnil

Art name
- Hangul: 사중
- Hanja: 士重
- RR: Sajung
- MR: Sajung

Courtesy name
- Hangul: 건재, 극념당
- Hanja: 健齋, 克念堂
- RR: Geonjae, Geuknyeomdang
- MR: Kŏnjae, Kŭngnyŏmdang

Posthumous name
- Hangul: 문열
- Hanja: 文烈
- RR: Munyeol
- MR: Munyŏl

Kim Ch'ŏnil (Korean: 김천일; Hanja: 金千鎰; 1537 – July 27, 1593) was a Korean military leader in the 16th century. He was a Joseon dynasty official and became a righteous army leader during the 1592–1598 Imjin War. He was killed in the second siege of Jinju in 1593.

== Early life ==
Kim Ch'ŏnil was born in 1537. He was a good hearted man with a great interest in academics. When Kim was 32 years old, Seonjo of Joseon said that he was upset about not bringing Kim as one of his officials. 5 years later, Kim was recommended to get a job in the government and Kim successfully got one. For years, Kim stayed as one of Seonjo's great officials.

== Outbreak of war ==
In 1592, Toyotomi Hideyoshi, the Taiko of Japan, invaded Korea with the intent of using it as a route to invade Ming China. His Samurai armies achieved early successes, conquering much of the southern Korean peninsula. Kim Ch'ŏnil, a middle-rank official who was then fifty-five years old, raised a small militia of three hundred men in his hometown of Naju. He marched the militia north, recruiting along the way, intending to reach Uiju and defend King Seonjo from the invaders. They instead encamped on Ganghwado.

== Siege of Jinju ==
In 1593, the Daimyo Katō Kiyomasa moved to attack the city of Jinju. This city had successfully withstood a siege the previous year, and Kato wanted revenge for the setbacks Japan had suffered in the Imjin war. Konishi Yukinaga informed Ming military advisor Shen Weijing of Kato's intent to attack, and told him that it was merely a face saving gesture rather than a new offensive.

Shen advised the Korean military to avoid Jinju, and let the Japanese destroy it. Kim Ch'ŏnil did not heed Shen's advice, and brought his militia into Jinju, intending to defend it from Kato. He was joined by Korean military personnel led by Hwang Jin and others, as well as another Righteous Army led by Ko Chong-hu. Jinju was encircled by samurai armies led by Kato, Konishi, Ukita Hideie, and Kikkawa Hiroie.

The Japanese commanders sent the defenders a message demanding they surrender. Kim replied that Chinese reinforcements were coming to rescue them. This was not true; Shen Weijing and his fellow Chinese generals had decided not to defend Jinju.

On July 27, the Japanese penetrated Jinju's walls. As the Japanese massacred the remaining defenders, Kim Ch'ŏnil committed suicide.

In 1603, Seonjo of Joseon posthumously awarded Kim Jwacheonsoung and in 1610, Gwanghaegun of Joseon awarded Kim Yŏngŭijŏng.
