= Ko Kyŏngmyŏng =

Joseon military commander (1533–1592)

- Hangul: 고경명
- Hanja: 高敬命
- RR: Go Gyeongmyeong
- MR: Ko Kyŏngmyŏng

Ko Kyŏngmyŏng (Korean: 고경명; Hanja: 高敬命; 1533–1592) was a Joseon scholar and yangban, who became a righteous army leader during the 1592–1598 Imjin War. He was killed while attacking Geumsan in 1592.

== Background ==
Ko was a yangban from the town of Changhung in Jeolla Province. He had failed the civil service examinations, and was therefore denied a post in the bureaucracy.

In 1592, the armies of Japanese regent Toyotomi Hideyoshi invaded Korea. They advanced north from Busan and occupied Seoul, forcing King Seonjo to flee. Ko, then sixty years old, began recruiting civilians into a righteous army militia. He planned to join forces with another Righteous army led by Cho Hŏn, and recapture Seoul from the Japanese. While on the way to Seoul, he heard that the Japanese were planning to attack Chonju, capital of Cholla, his home province, from the captured city of Geumsan.

== Attack on Geumsan and death ==
Ko decided to attack the Japanese at Geumsan to prevent them from invading Cholla. He joined forces with Korean regulars led by General Kwak Yŏng, and marched to Geumsan. The Japanese forces inside the city were led by the Daimyo Kobayakawa Takakage.

Although the government forces were pushed back, Ko's militia succeeded in breaching the outer walls and setting several buildings ablaze. Despite this initial success, the Japanese forces eventually halted the militia's advance, forcing them to retreat.

On the second day of fighting, the Japanese forces counterattacked. The government forces and most of the militia fled, but Ko refused to retreat. He was killed along with two of his sons and a small group of fighters in hand-to-hand combat with the Japanese soldiers.

== Aftermath ==
The Japanese army, after repelling the attack on Geumsan, moved to take Jeonju. The ensuing Battle of Jeonju ended with a Korean victory.

One of Ko's surviving sons, Ko Chŏnghu, became a Righteous army leader. He went on to fight alongside Kim Ch'ŏnil in the second siege of Jinju.
