= Siege of Jinju (1593) =

Siege during Hideyoshi's invasion of Korea

Second siege of Jinju
- Part of the Imjin War
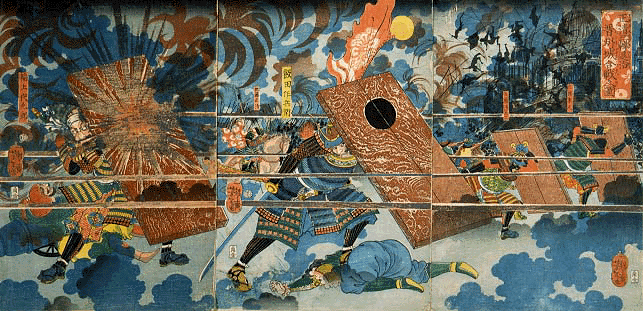
- Japanese illustration circa 1890
Date	20–27 July 1593
Location	Jinju Fortress, Korea 35°11′20″N 128°04′41″E
Result	Japanese victory

Belligerents
Japan	Joseon

Commanders and leaders
Katō Kiyomasa; Ukita Hideie; Kuroda Nagamasa; Tachibana Muneshige; Kobayakawa Takakage; Mōri Hidemoto; Kikkawa Hiroie; Shimazu Yoshihiro	Kim Ch'ŏnil (executed); Hwang Jin †; Seo Yeweon †; Ko Chong-hu †

Strength
90,000	4,000–6,000 soldiers 60,000 (including civilians)

Casualties and losses
13,000+	20,000 heads according to Japanese claims 60,000 killed according Korean sources
- Location within South Korea

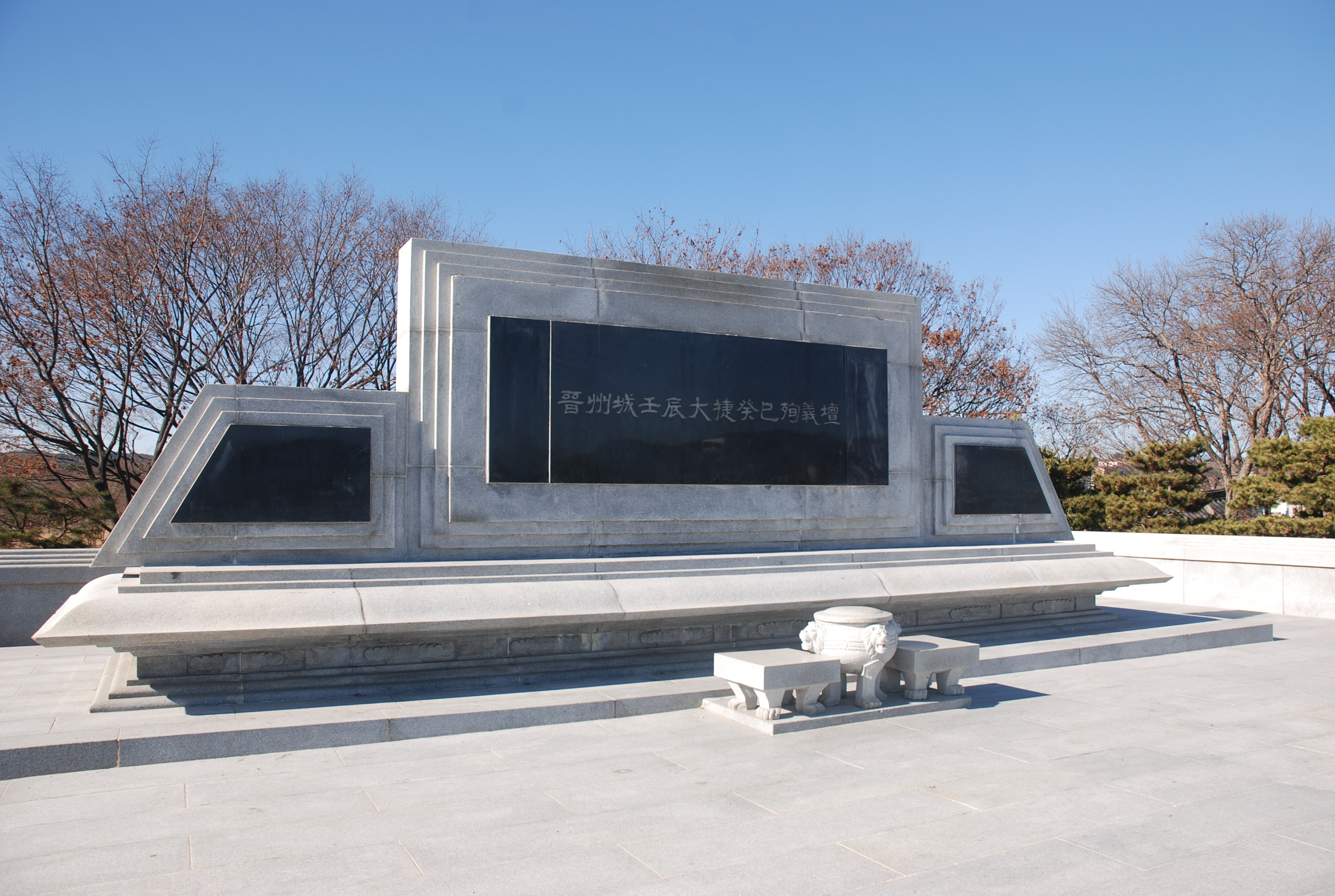
monument to both battles

The second siege of Jinju was a battle fought on 1593 at Jinju Fortress during the Imjin War. It occurred from 20 July to 27 July and ended in the massacre of the entire garrison and a substantial portion of the population. The Second Battle of Jinju became the origin of the Uwajima Ushi-oni Festival in Uwajima, Ehime Prefecture, Japan.

== Background ==
During the Imjin War, Toyotomi Hideyoshi was determined to take Jinju after the previous Japanese failure to take the city. Konishi Yukinaga informed Ming military advisor Shen Weijing of Kato's intent to attack and told him that it was merely a face-saving gesture rather than a new offensive. Shen advised the Korean military to avoid Jinju and let the Japanese destroy it. Kim Chŏn-il did not heed Shen's advice and brought his militia along with Korean military personnel led by Hwang Jin, a righteous army led by Ko Chong-hu, and others into Jinju, intending to defend it from Kato. Not knowing where the Japanese were going, the Koreans divided their forces with Kim Ch'ŏnil, commanding the garrison of 4,000 soldiers at Jinju, who were joined by volunteers, guerrillas, a small Chinese force, and a large number of civilians including women and children, making for a total of about 60,000.

The Japanese arrived at Jinju on 20 July 1593 with 90,000 troops with reinforcements from Japan. Ukita Hideie led 90,000 Japanese troops to take Jinju, making it the largest mobilization of Japanese forces for a single operation in the entire war. The Japanese began to construct wooden shields to allow them to advance against the walls. To the west were Konishi Yukinaga with 26,000 men, and to the north were Kato Kiyomasa with 25,000 while Ukita Hideie and Kikkawa Hiroie commanded the reserve of 17,000.

== Battle ==
On 21 July 1593, the Japanese attacked, breaking the dyke that filled the moat around Jinju. At the same time, the samurai advanced under their wooden shields to be stopped by Korean fire arrows, cannonballs, and arquebuses. The Japanese then raised scaling ladders under the cover of arquebusiers, and the Koreans dumped rocks and hot burning oil on the Japanese. On 22 July, the Japanese tried again with siege towers, but Korean cannon fire destroyed them. On 23 July, the Japanese attacked again with siege towers, which were knocked down by Korean cannon fire.

On 24 July, the Japanese now attacked with armored carts called "tortoise shell wagons," which allowed the Japanese to advance up to the walls, where the sappers would pull out the stones of a section of the outer wall, but as a Japanese account complained: "They tried to attack, but from inside the castle soldiers threw pine torches to set the grass alight. The soldiers inside the tortoise wagons also burned and retreated". On 25 July, under a flag of truce, Ukita sent a messenger to Kim, telling him that the Japanese would slaughter 10,000 Korean peasants whom they had taken prisoner if Jinju did not surrender at once. Kim refused to surrender, replying that Chinese reinforcements were coming to rescue them. That was not true; Shen Weijing and his fellow Chinese generals had decided not to defend Jinju. 10,000 Korean peasants were beheaded.

On 27 July, the Japanese attacked the same weakened wall area with the "tortoise shell wagons." Still, a heavy thunderstorm prevented Korean attempts to incinerate the Japanese by dropping torches soaked in fat. With the aid of a rainstorm, the Japanese sappers broke down a section of the wall dislodging its foundations, and a great rush broke out with the samurai pushing each other down as it was a great honor to be the first samurai to enter a fortress. Goto Mototsugu, a retainer of Kuroda Nagamasa, was about to be the first samurai to enter Jinju when Iida Kakbei, a retainer of Kato Kiyomasa, threw the Nichiren flag into the breach to claim that honor for himself. The Korean garrison was out of ammunition and was short of swords, so many Koreans fought with wooden sticks against the surge of samurai armed with katanas. Hwang Jin survived two shots in the chest but kept fighting until he succumbed to his wounds, crumbling the defenders' morale.

General Sŏ Yewon engaged in long single combat with a samurai named Okamoto Gonjo, which ended when the wounded General Sŏ lost his breath and fell by a tree. Okamoto took the chance to sever his head with a single blow from his katana. Sŏ's head fell by the Nam River, which as it was a great honor for a samurai to take the head of their enemies. Okamoto ordered a search to find Sŏ's head so that it could be salted and taken back to Japan. The Korean commander, General Kim Ch'ŏnil, committed suicide. The Japanese took no prisoners, killing almost everyone, both military and civilian. The Nam River ran red with blood as thousands attempted to swim across it, only to be cut down by the samurai waiting on the other side.

== Aftermath ==
Jinju was taken only for symbolic purposes, and instead of advancing, the Japanese force at Jinju halted. Toyotomi Hideyoshi was well satisfied that he had avenged the defeat of 1592 at Jinju, though Turnbull argued that to lose so many men to take a town only for symbolic reasons was wasteful.

The chronicler of the Kato clan noted: "All the Chinese were terrified of our Japanese blades and jumped into the river, but we pulled them and cut off their heads." Korean accounts mention that the death toll at Jinju was 60,000. Afterwards the Japanese retreated to Busan. According to Japanese accounts, mentions they had sent 20,000 heads back to Japan after their victory.

== Bibliography ==
- Alagappa, Muthiah (2003), Asian Security Order: Instrumental and Normative Features, Stanford University Press, ISBN 0-8047-4629-X
- Arano, Yasunori (July 2005). "The Formation of a Japanocentric World Order". International Journal of Asian Studies. 2 (2): 185–216. doi:10.1017/S1479591405000094. S2CID 145541884.; originally appeared as "Nihongata kai chitsujo no keisei" in Nihon no shakaishi 1, Rettō naigai no kōtsu to kokka. Tokyo: Iwanami shoten, 1987.
- Brown, Delmer M. (May 1948), "The Impact of Firearms on Japanese Warfare, 1543–1598", The Far Eastern Quarterly, 7 (3), Association for Asian Studies: 236–53, doi:10.2307/2048846, JSTOR 2048846
- Eikenberry, Karl W. (1988), "The Imjin War", Military Review, 68 (2): 74–82
- Ha, Tae-hung; Sohn, Pow-key (1977), 'Nanjung Ilgi: War Diary of Admiral Yi Sun-sin, Yonsei University Press, ISBN 89-7141-018-3
- Haboush, JaHyun Kim (2016), The Great East Asian War and the Birth of the Korean Nation, ISBN 978-0-231-54098-8
- Hawley, Samuel (2005), The Imjin War, The Royal Asiatic Society, Korea Branch/UC Berkeley Press, ISBN 89-954424-2-5
- Jang, Pyun-soon (1998), Noon-eu-ro Bo-nen Han-gook-yauk-sa 5: Gor-yeo Si-dae (눈으로 보는 한국역사 5: 고려시대), Park Doo-ui, Bae Keum-ram, Yi Sang-mi, Kim Ho-hyun, Kim Pyung-sook, et al., Joog-ang Gyo-yook-yaun-goo-won. 1998-10-30. Seoul, Korea.
- Kim, Ki-chung (Fall 1999), "Resistance, Abduction, and Survival: The Documentary Literature of the Imjin War (1592–8)", Korean Culture, 20 (3): 20–29
- Kim, Yung-sik (1998), "Problems and Possibilities in the Study of the History of Korean Science", Osiris, 2nd Series, 13: 48–79, doi:10.1086/649280, JSTOR 301878, S2CID 143724260
- 桑田忠親 [Kuwata, Tadachika], ed., 舊參謀本部編纂, [Kyu Sanbo Honbu], 朝鮮の役 [Chousen no Eki] (日本の戰史 [Nihon no Senshi] Vol. 5), 1965.
- Neves, Jaime Ramalhete (1994), "The Portuguese in the Im-Jim War?", Review of Culture, 18: 20–24
- Niderost, Eric (June 2001), "Turtleboat Destiny: The Imjin War and Yi Sun Shin", Military Heritage, 2 (6): 50–59, 89
- Niderost, Eric (January 2002), "The Miracle at Myongnyang, 1597", Osprey Military Journal, 4 (1): 44–50
- Park, Yune-hee (1973), Admiral Yi Sun-shin and His Turtleboat Armada: A Comprehensive Account of the Resistance of Korea to the 16th Century Japanese Invasion, Shinsaeng Press
- Rockstein, Edward D. (1993), Strategic And Operational Aspects of Japan's Invasions of Korea 1592–1598 1993-6-18, Naval War College
- Sadler, A. L. (June 1937), "The Naval Campaign in the Korean War of Hideyoshi (1592–1598)", Transactions of the Asiatic Society of Japan, Second Series, 14: 179–208
- Sansom, George (1961), A History of Japan 1334–1615, Stanford University Press, ISBN 0-8047-0525-9
- Sohn, Pow-key (April–June 1959), "Early Korean Painting", Journal of the American Oriental Society, 79 (2): 96–103, doi:10.2307/595851, JSTOR 595851
- Stramigioli, Giuliana (December 1954), "Hideyoshi's Expansionist Policy on the Asiatic Mainland", Transactions of the Asiatic Society of Japan, Third Series, 3: 74–116
- Strauss, Barry (Summer 2005), "Korea's Legendary Admiral", MHQ: The Quarterly Journal of Military History, 17 (4): 52–61
- Swope, Kenneth M. (2006), "Beyond Turtleboats: Siege Accounts from Hideyoshi's Second Invasion of Korea, 1597–1598", Sungkyun Journal of East Asian Studies, 6 (2), Academy of East Asian Studies: 177–206
- Swope, Kenneth M. (2005), "Crouching Tigers, Secret Weapons: Military Technology Employed During the Sino-Japanese-Korean War, 1592–1598", The Journal of Military History, 69: 11–42, doi:10.1353/jmh.2005.0059, S2CID 159829515
- Swope, Kenneth M. (December 2002), "Deceit, Disguise, and Dependence: China, Japan, and the Future of the Tributary System, 1592–1596", The International History Review, 24 (4): 757–1008, doi:10.1080/07075332.2002.9640980, S2CID 154827808
- Swope, Kenneth M. (2009), A Dragon's Head and a Serpent's Tail: Ming China and the First Great East Asian War, 1592–1598, University of Oklahoma Press
- Turnbull, Stephen (2002), Samurai Invasion: Japan's Korean War 1592–98, Cassell & Co, ISBN 0-304-35948-3
- Turnbull, Stephen (2008), The Samurai Invasion of Korea 1592-98, Osprey Publishing Ltd
- Turnbull, Stephen (1998), The Samurai Sourcebook, Cassell & Co, ISBN 1-85409-523-4
- Villiers, John (1980), "SILK and Silver: Macau, Manila, and Trade in the China Seas in the Sixteenth Century" (PDF), Journal of the Royal Asiatic Society Hong Kong Branch, 20, The HKUL Digital Initiatives, ISSN 1991-7295 (A lecture delivered to the Hong Kong Branch of the Royal Asiatic Society at the Hong Kong Club, 10 June 1980)
- Yi, Min-woong (2004), Imjin Wae-ran Haejeonsa: The Naval Battles of the Imjin War [임진왜란 해전사], Chongoram Media [청어람미디어], ISBN 89-89722-49-7
