= Uwajima Ushi-oni Festival =

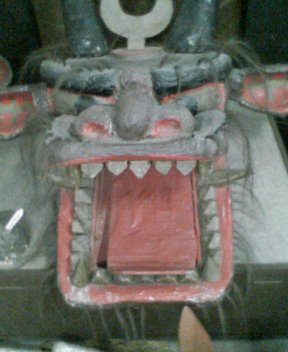
A mask of the Cow Demon (牛鬼, ushi-oni), one of the many used at the bullfighting festival.

The Uwajima Ushi-oni festival (宇和島牛鬼祭り, Uwajima Ushi-oni matsuri) is a festival and purification event held annually July 22–24 in Uwajima, Ehime Prefecture, Japan. The festival derives from an incident in the 16th-century Japanese invasions of Korea, and includes an ushi-oni parade, bull fighting, fireworks and dancing.

== History ==
The festival began in 1950 and was originally called the Uwajima Shōkō festival (shōkō means commerce/industry). The ushi-oni parade was introduced in 1967, and in 1996 the festival took its current name.

== Ushi-oni parade ==
The ushi-oni, or "cow ogre," effigy is 5-6 meters long with a long neck and ogre-like face, covered in palm or red fur and ending in a tail shaped like a sword. Traditionally made from bamboo and logs colored red, nowadays more than 20 different effigies with colors like blue or purple are used. A miniature version is used by children.

The ushi-oni has a prominent role in the festival, and many people go to houses around Uwajima with an ushi-oni for purification. Unlike the similar lion dance, the shaking of the ushi-oni's head, not its bite, indicates purification.

During the parade, people shoulder ushi-oni with shouts of wasshoi, wasshoi, accompanied by bamboo flutes (kaifuki) blown by children. The same flutes were used by Katō Kiyomasa when attacking Jinju Castle (see below). On the last day of the festival, teams compete for strength by running their ushi-oni into each other.

=== Origin ===
There are a variety of views about the origin, but one view is that the festival derives from the second Siege of Jinju in 1593 during the first Japanese invasion of Korea.

According to Nihon Gaishi (unofficial history of Japan), written by Raisanyō in the 1880s, Toyotomi Hideyoshi, ruler of Japan in the late 16th century, designated Katō Kiyomasa as commander in the second Siege of Jinju (1593). For the siege, Kiyomasa and a Japanese soldier created a tortoise shell wagon using wrapped hard board and cowhide that soldiers could enter and hide to save themselves from arrows and stones. The soldiers attacked from behind Jinju and were able to successfully break into the fortress.

The tortoise shell wagon had a fake, angry-looking cow head on top, and was called the "cow ogre," or ushi-oni. Nowadays, the ushi-oni is essential to the Uwajima Ushi-oni festival and is readily familiar residents of the area.

== Other activities ==
The first day is called the Uwajima Gaiya carnival, with street stalls and a fireworks display. The second day features a musical parade at Uwajima street and local food for sale, with a miniature ushi-oni parade in the afternoon. On the second night, people dance a traditional Uwajima dance called the Uwajima Ondō.

The last day is the ushi-oni parade. Twenty ushi-oni are carried from the Nanyo Culture Center along the main street and shopping arcade before heading toward the Suka River and Warei Shrine, where the ushi-oni are returned.
