= Shin Dol-seok =

Korean revolutionary (1878–1908)

Shin Dol-seok (Korean: 신돌석; Hanja: 申乭石; 1878 – 1908) was a Korean general of a righteous Army that fought against the Japanese army in the early 20th century.

== Early life ==
He was born in Yeonghae (now Yeongdeok), North Gyeongsang Province. He was the son of Shin Seok-ju, and a member of the Pyongsan Shin clan.

== Military career ==
Righteous armies emerged in the aftermath of the assassination of Empress Myeongseong and an ordinance prohibiting sangtu. It was motivated by anti-Japanese sentiment. Armies were raised against Japan from every corner of the country. At that time, 19-year-old Shin Dol-seok participated in the anti-Japanese movement raising 100 soldiers. In 1905, the Eulsa Treaty (also known as the Japan-Korea Protectorate Treaty), made a pact between Korea and Japan. Due to the unequal and compulsory nature of the treaty, many people, including Shin Dol-seok, struggled against the Japanese army. In 1907, Korea signed another unequal treaty with Japan, at which time the previously irregular Righteous Armies finally formed a union against the Japanese army. However, other generals ruled Shin Dol-seok out of the union because he was a commoner. In the Korea of that time, it was not easy for a commoner to lead an army because of the strong adherence to the status system. However, his successful leadership using guerrilla tactics led many people to welcome his army, and began a successful campaign against Japanese troops. However, the Japanese Imperial forces started wiping out every Koreans that they found in independence fighter's hideouts, regardless of status, and Dol-seok's army was the ones that were hit particularly hard. After the events that have been contributing in slowly driving out the Japanese, Dol-seok was murdered by his cousin in 1908, who was blinded by the enormous bounty on his head. In 1962, for the contributions to the independence of Korea, he was awarded for his distinguished services by the Korean government.
