= Cho Tong-yun =

Korean general (1871–1923)

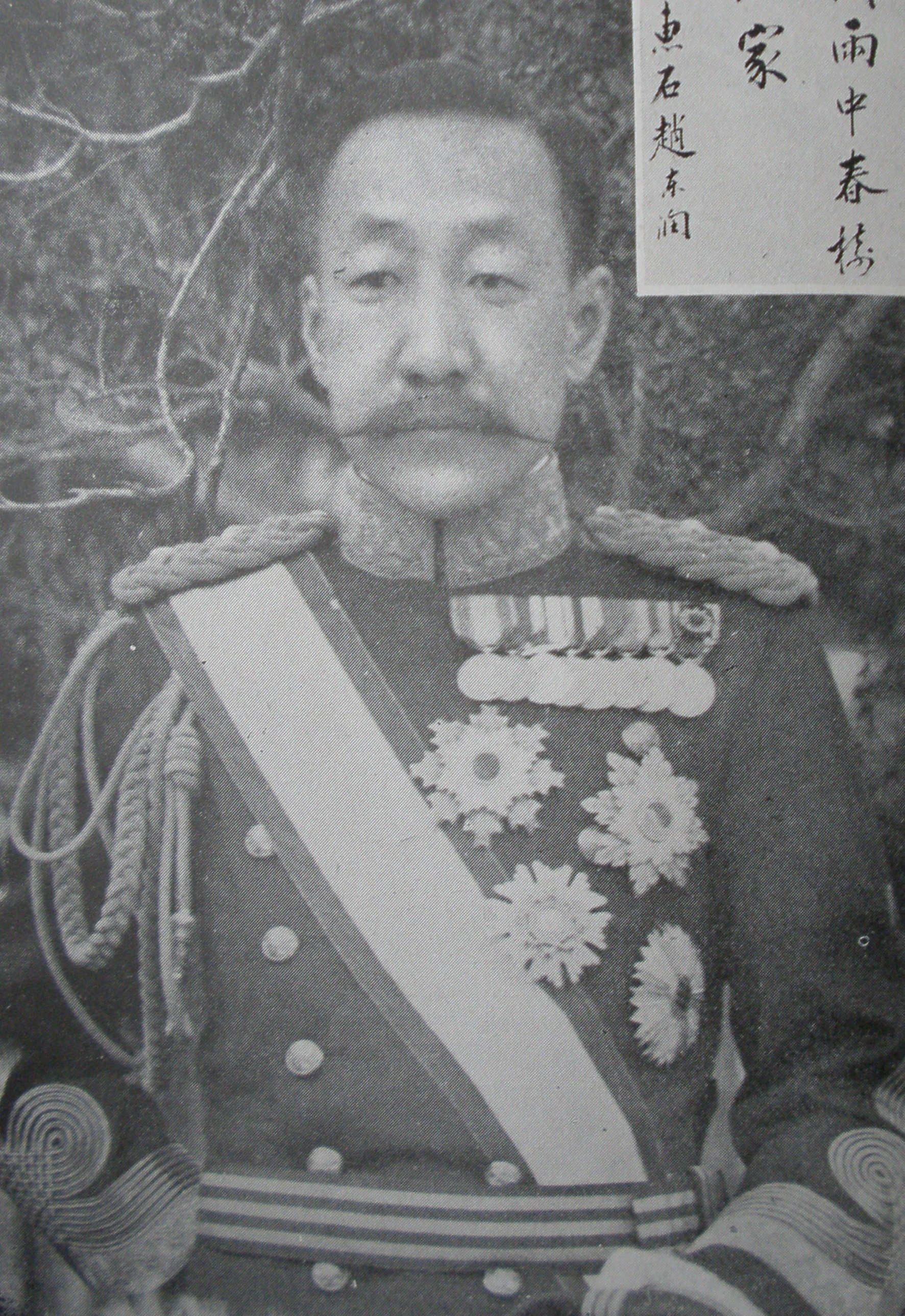
Cho in Imperial Japanese Army dress uniform

Cho Tong-yun (Korean: 조동윤; Hanja: 趙東潤; 1871–1923) was a general of the Imperial Korean Army and later the Imperial Japanese Army. He was one of the Korean collaborators with Imperial Japan.

== Biography ==
Cho was born in 1871 as a member of Pungyang Jo clan. His father was an official named Cho Young-ha who was murdered during the Gapsin Coup. In January 1887, Cho became an official. He was a teacher for young students. After the proclamation of the Korean Empire, Cho became part of the Board of Marshals in 1898 as director of military. As a Lieutenant Colonel, Cho was the first commander of 1st Siwi Regiment. In November 1898, Cho was promoted to Major General. Next year, Cho was promoted to Lieutenant General. Cho later became headmaster of the Military Academy of Korean Empire and chief of the military court in November 1903. On 8 July 1904, Cho received 2nd class of Order of the Taegeuk.

In 1905, Cho visited Ministry of the Army of Japan, and received the 1st class of Order of the Sacred Treasure on 17 August 1905. In 1907, Cho received the 1st class of Order of the Taegeuk. In 1907, Cho helped with the Crown prince's boarding in the Empire of Japan. Cho received the 1st class of Order of the Rising Sun on 26 February 1908. From April 1908, Cho stayed in Tokyo. After the annexation of Korea, Cho became a Lieutenant General of Imperial Japanese Army. Moreover, he was ennobled as baron. On 13 January 1911, Cho received 25,000 Won from the Japanese Government. He helped the procession funeral of Gojong of Korea and wedding of Yi Un in Tokyo. Cho participated in coronation of Emperor Taishō as representative of Korean-Japanese nobles. Cho died on 21 May 1923. His son inherited the title of baron.

== Gallery ==
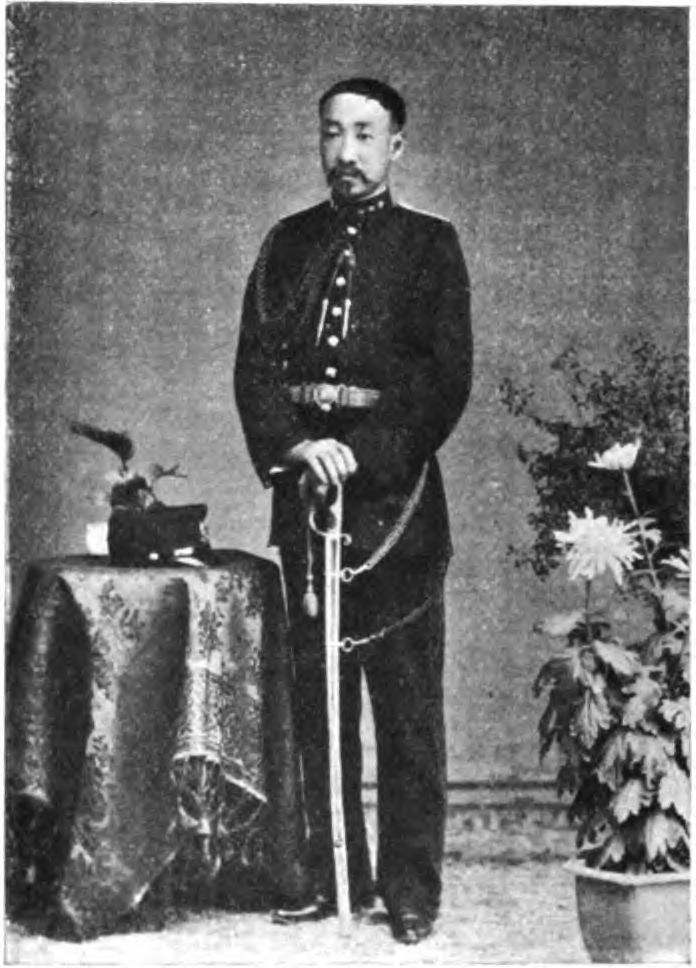
Cho in ordinary uniform of Imperial Korean Army

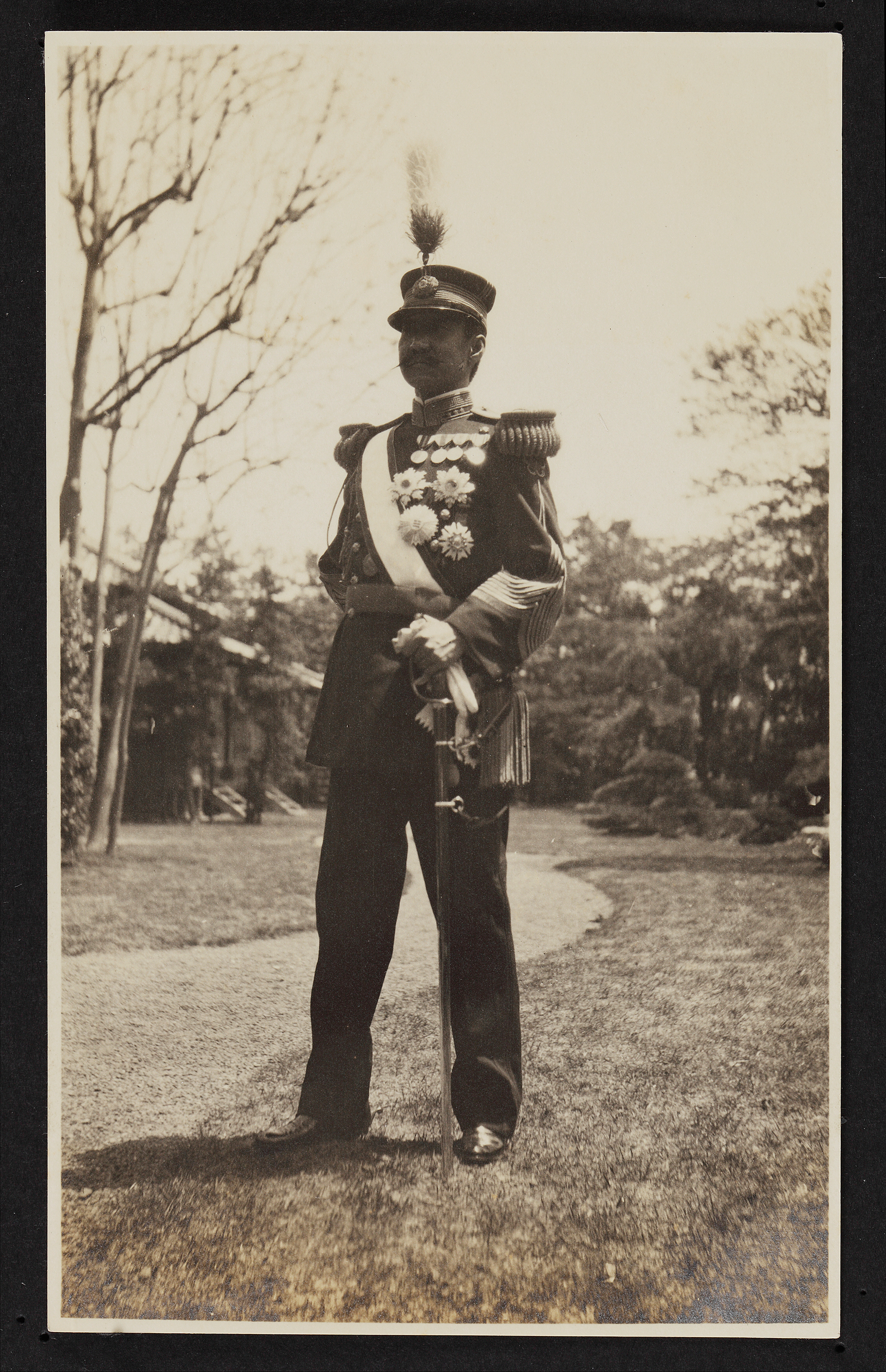
Cho in full dress uniform of Imperial Korean Army

== Honours ==
Korean Empire

- Order of the Taegeuk 2nd Class (1904), 1st class (1907)

Empire of Japan

- Order of the Sacred Treasure 1st Class
- Order of the Rising Sun 1st Class

Military offices
New title	Commander, 1st Siwi Regiment; 2 June 1898 – 11 November 1898	Succeeded by Lieutenant colonel Gwon Yong-guk
