= Righteous armies =

Irregular civilian militias in Korea

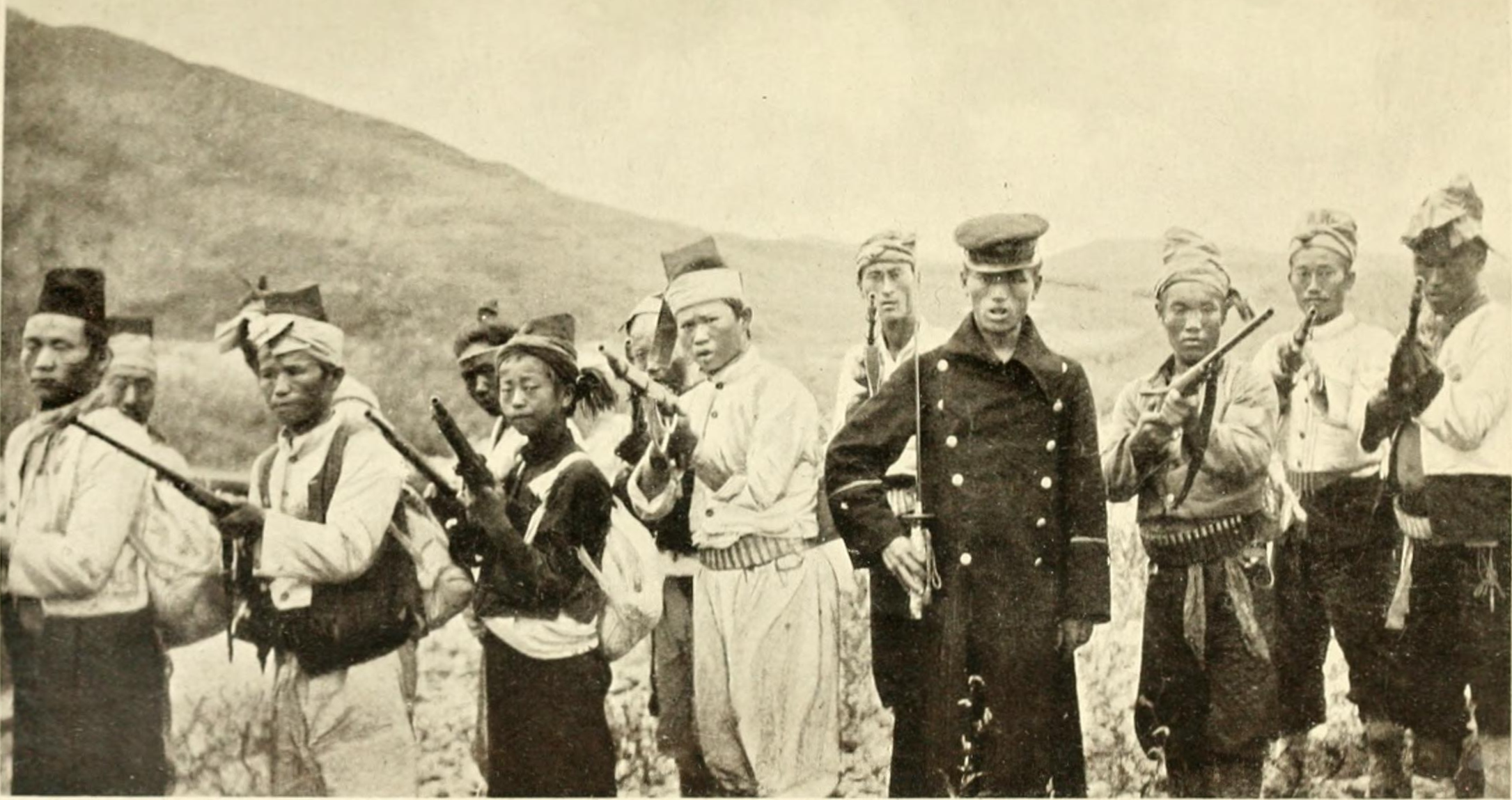
- Anti-Japanese Korean rebels, photographed in 1907 by Frederick Arthur MacKenzie

Korean name
- Hangul: 의병
- Hanja: 義兵
- RR: uibyeong
- MR: ŭibyŏng

In Korean history, righteous armies (Korean: 의병), sometimes translated as irregular armies or militias, mainly refers to civilian armed organizations that were spontaneously formed to fight against foreign invasions, such as the Imjin War and the Qing invasion of Joseon. The Righteous armies under the Korean Empire also followed this trend; they did not have proper weapons, but fought against Japanese imperialism.

== Japanese invasions of Korea ==
The righteous armies were an irregular military that fought the Japanese army that twice invaded Korea during the Japanese invasions of Korea (1592–1598). Righteous armies were most active in the Jeolla Province in the southwestern area of Korea. Righteous armies included peasants, scholars, former government officials, as well as Buddhist warrior monks. Righteous armies were important during the war as a significant portion of the expected government organized resistance had been destroyed in Gyeongsang and Chungcheong Provinces by the Japanese forces at the outset. The natural defenders had been defeated and the residue had been called north to help protect the fleeing king. Many of the district officers had obtained their commissions through bribery or influence, and were essentially incompetent or cowards, evidenced in their own performance and that of their units in the early days of the conflict. This kind of resistance was totally unexpected by the Japanese. In Japanese warfare, civilians would simply submit where their leaders fell. However, the Japanese were shocked upon learning that the Korean people were forming organized resistance against them. Japanese strategies were based on the premise that the people of Korea would submit to them and assist their supply line by giving them food. However, this was not the case and righteous armies continued to interrupt the Japanese supply line. People's voluntary resistance movements were one of the major reasons why the Japanese invasion was not successful.

Righteous armies were organized and led by seonbi, who were Confucian philosophers and mostly trained archers. Political positions, social status, and economic interests were not consistent between the righteous army commanders who created the righteous army during the Japanese Invasion of Korea in 1592, but there were factors that made them combine.

First, most of the righteous army chiefs were former civil servants among the aristocrats, but most of them were former officials. The spirit of Geunwang spread among local Confucian scholars in order to practice Confucian Taoism, which was usually learned as a local giant, and they were enraged by the incompetence and cowardice of the local leader and armed men.

Second, the creation of the righteous army was for the defense of the local people and their relatives, and furthermore, it was the manifestation of national sentiment against the barbarism of the Japanese invaders. Joseon, which regarded Confucian ethics as a thorough social norm, considered the Japanese as aggressors because of the continuous looting of Japanese pirates from the end of the Goryeo period, and culturally despised them and called them Wae or Seom Orang-ke. When invaded by Japan, the creation of the righteous army occurred as a national resistance movement.

During the Japanese Invasion of Korea in 1592, the righteous army chiefs were at the top of society in the provinces and served as spiritual leaders, and economically, they were small and medium-sized landowners who had an organic connection with farmers through the land. The Japanese invasion of the country destroyed their social and economic foundations.

On the other hand, the people wanted a well-known and reliable righteous army commander to fight under, rather than the command of an incompetent general who was forced to serve by the government. In addition, it was advantageous to go to the righteous army rather than the government army to protect parents, wives, and children around the local area. Since the royal court also recognized the righteous army as a public army to encourage the creation of the righteous army, the number of participants in the righteous army of the general public continued to increase.

=== In Gyeongsang province ===
- Hapcheon (June 6, 1592): Kim Myŏn and Chŏng Inhong against Mōri Terumoto
- Chogye (June 7, 1592): Son Ingap against Mōri Terumoto
- Ucheokhyeon (July 10, 1592): Kim Myŏn and Kim Sŏngil against Kobayakawa Takakage
- Yeongcheon (July 27, 1592): Kwŏn Ŭngsu and Pak Chin Fukushima Masanori
- Uiryeong: Kwak Chaeu against Kobayakawa Takakage
- Hyeonpung: Kwak Chaeu against Hashiba Hidekatsu
- Yeongsan: Kwak Chaeu against Hashiba Hidekatsu

=== In Jeolla province ===
- Damyang (June 25, 1592) : Ko Kyŏngmyŏng and Yang Taepak
- Naju : Kim Ch'ŏnil
- Gwangju : Kim Tŏngnyŏng

=== In Chungcheong province ===
- Geumsan (July 9, 1592) : Ko Kyŏngmyŏng and Kwak Yŏng against Kobayakawa Takakage
- Okcheon : Cho Hŏn
- Geumsan : Yeonggyu and Cho Hŏn
- Cheongju : Yeonggyu and Cho Hŏn

=== In Hwanghae province ===
- Yeonan : Yi Chŏngam

=== In Pyeongan province ===
- Mountain Myohyang : Seosan

=== In Hamgyeong province ===
- Gilju : Chŏng Munbu

== Manchu invasion of Korea ==
During the Jeongmyo-Horan and Byeongja-Horan, righteous armies rose up in each region. At this time, the motivation for the creation of the righteous army was to overcome the difficulty caused by the defeat of the government army. In other words, most of them were Geunwangbyeong (근왕병: Royal Provincial Army).

During the Horan period, the righteous army rose early not only in the invaded area but also in the rear area. The goal of the righteous army's activity in the invaded area was to directly fight the enemy and cause losses. The purpose for creation in the rear area was to gather the recruited righteous army participants in one place and go to the battlefield to overcome the helplessness of the government army.

However, overall, the activities of the righteous army during the Horan were comparatively weaker than those of the righteous army during the Imjin War. The reason was that after the Imjin War, political turmoil, economic collapse, and social unrest continued, resulting in no sense of unity between the authorities and the people centered on the dynasty.

In fact, during the invasion, the righteous army did not see much clear activity in the area where the enemy invaded. Mock activities were carried out in the rear areas of Honam and Yeongnam, but they were disbanded when Injo gave in to the Qing dynasty while heading to the northern battlefield.

For example, In Yean-hyeon, the seonbi clans of Yean-hyeon, centered on the Gwangsan Kim clan, were active in Hyanggyo. When the Jeongmyo-Horan broke out, the seonbi clans of Yean-hyeon organized and divided the righteous army around the righteous army office (兵廳廳소) by mission, and most of them focused on mobilizing the supplies rather than mobilizing for military activities. Therefore, the righteous army was disbanded as reinforcement was promoted with little actual military activities.

== Japanese annexation of Korea ==
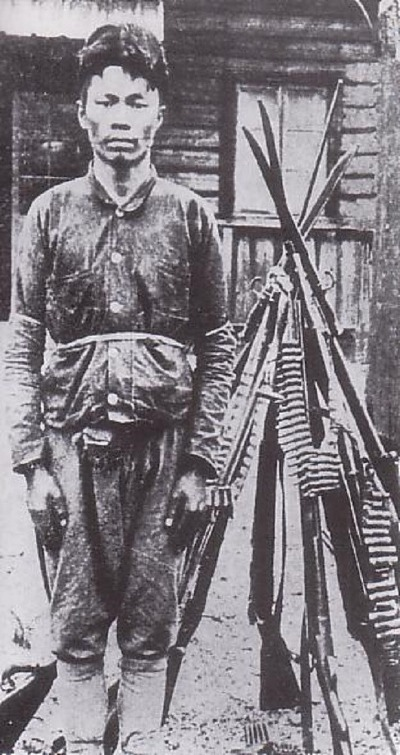
Anti-Japanese militiaman

When the Japan-Korea Protectorate Treaty was signed in 1905, the restoration of national sovereignty emerged as the most pressing issue. Righteous armies rose up across the country to attack Japanese soldiers, merchants, and pro-Japanese Koreans pejoratively referred to as collaborators or Chinilpa. The Righteous Army that rose up in this year is called the Jeongmi Righteous Army (乙巳義兵) and was initially led by Confucian scholars, including Choe Ik-hyeon. However, when government troops moved to suppress them, the Confucian scholars surrendered voluntarily, driven by their commitment to feudal ethics that prohibited drawing a sword against the king. Unknown gentry members and local peasants became the core of the righteous armies.

After the disbandment of the Korean Empire's army due to the Japan–Korea Treaty of 1907, a significant number of soldiers joined the Righteous Army. The Righteous Army that rose up in this year is called the Jeongmi Righteous Army (丁未義兵), of which the leaders were either fallen nobles, such as Sim Nam-il and Ahn Gyu-hong, or commoners such as Shin Dol-seok. The Righteous Army struggle between 1907 and 1910 was so intense that according to official Japanese statistics, there were 150,000 uprisings, 2,851 clashes, 16,700 deaths, and 36,770 wounded, for a total of 53,000 Righteous Army casualties.

At the time, the most active area for the Righteous Army's struggle was South Jeolla Province, and Japanese landowners in this region became the primary targets of the Righteous Army's activities. In 1909, at the strong request of the Mokpo Japanese Chamber of Commerce, the Japanese Empire launched the so-called Big suppression operation against South Korea (南韓大討伐作戰), engaging in a decisive battle with the Righteous Army in Korea. As a result, the Righteous Army suffered a decisive blow and was forced to relocate its base to Manchuria and other places. The remaining Righteous Army members grew into the core of the Korean Independence Army.

=== During the Righteous Armies resistance ===
The Righteous Army was formed by Yu In-seok and other Confucian scholars during the Peasant Wars. Its ranks swelled after the murder of Queen Min by a group of Japanese militants. Under the leadership of Min Jeong-sik, Choe Ik-hyeon, and Shin Dol-seok, the Righteous Army attacked the Japanese army, Japanese merchants, and pro-Japanese bureaucrats in the provinces of Gangwon, Chungcheong, Jeolla, and Gyeongsang.

Choe Ik-hyeon was captured by the Japanese and taken to Tsushima Island where he went on hunger strike and eventually died in 1906. Shin Dol-seok was an uneducated peasant who ultimately commanded over 3,000 troops; among those troops were former government soldiers, poor peasants, fishermen, tiger hunters, miners, merchants, and laborers.

The Korean army was disbanded on August 1, 1907. The Army was led by 1st Battalion Commander Major Park Seung-hwan, who later committed suicide, which occurred after the disbandment and was led by former soldiers of the Korean Army against the Japanese in Namdaemun Gate. The disbanded army joined the Righteous Army and together they solidified the foundation for the Righteous Armies battle.

In 1907, the Righteous Army under the command of Yi In-yeong amassed 10,000 troops to liberate Seoul and defeat the Japanese. The Army came within 12 km of Seoul but could not withstand the Japanese counter-offensive. The Righteous Army was no match for two infantry divisions of 20,000 Japanese soldiers backed by warships moored near Incheon.

The Righteous Army retreated from Seoul, and the war went on for two more years. Over 17,000 Righteous Army soldiers were killed and more than 37,000 were wounded in combat. Unable to fight the Japanese army head-on, the Righteous Army split into small bands of partisans to carry on the War of Liberation in China, Siberia, and the Baekdu Mountains in Korea. The Japanese troops first quashed the Peasant Army and then disbanded what remained of the government army. Many of the surviving guerrilla and anti-Japanese government troops fled to Manchuria and Primorsky Krai to carry on their fight. In 1910, Japan annexed Korea and started the period of Japanese rule.

=== Armies and orders of battle ===
Of the sixty righteous armies, the list and descriptions below follow what is known of the names of the more well-known armies and their sequential appearance in combat; individual generals and named figures are given larger biographies on separate articles which cite more historical background.

==== In 1895: Righteous army of Eulmi ====
- Yi So-ung
- No Eung-gyu
- Gi U-man
- Yi Gang-nyeon

==== In 1905: Righteous army of Eulsa ====
- Choe Ik-hyeon
- Min Jong-sik
- Shin Dol-seok
- Jeong Yong-gi
- Yi Han-gu
- Im Byeong-chan

==== In 1907: Righteous army of Jeongmi ====
- Hong Beom-do
- Yun Hui-sun
- Cha Do-seon
- Kim Su-min
- Min Geung-ho

==== 13 province alliance righteous army in 1908 ====
- Commander in chief: Yi In-yeong
- Commander: Heo Wi
- Representative of Gangwon: Min Geung-ho
- Representative of Chungcheong: Yi Gang-nyeon
- Representative of Gyeongsang: Park Jeong-bin
- Representative of Gyeonggi, Hwanghae: Gwon Jung-hui
- Representative of Pyeongan: Bang In-gwan
- Representative of North Hamgyeong: Jeong Bong-jun
- Representative of Jeolla: Mun Tae-su

== See also ==
- Battle of Namdaemun
- Battle of Qingshanli
- History of Korea
- Korean independence movement
- Korean Liberation Army
- List of militant Korean independence activist groups
  - Righteous Army Command
