= 1st Siwi Regiment =

1st Siwi Regiment 시위 제1연대 侍衛第一聯隊
- Active: May 1898 – August 1907
- Disbanded: August 1907
- Country: Korean Empire
- Branch: Army
- Type: Guards Infantry
- Engagements: Battle of Namdaemun

Commanders
- Notable commanders: Cho Tong-yun

The 1st Siwi Regiment later Siwi Mixed Brigade was a unit of Imperial Korean Army. The regiment was formed in May 1898. However after the Japan–Korea Treaty of 1907, the regiment was disestablished.

== Lineage ==
By the order of Gojong of Korea, 1st Siwi Regiment was established on 27 May 1898. The Regiment included 1st Siwi Battalion and 2nd Siwi Battalion. Colonel or Lieutenant Colonel was the commander, Captain was the adjutant, First or Second Lieutenant was Quartermaster and Second Lieutenant managed the ensign of the Regiment. 3 Non-commissioned officers were attached to the regiment.

Western-style Military Band was established for the Regiment. From 5 April 1902, Franz Eckert was instructor of the military band.

On 22 April 1907, the regiment became Siwi Mixed Brigade (시위혼성여단), and included 2nd Siwi Regiment, Siwi Field Artillery Battalion, Siwi Cavalry Battalion, and Siwi Pioneer Battalion.

== Battle of Namdaemun ==
After the Japan-Korea Treaty of 1907, 1st Siwi Regiment was planned to be disestablished. Because of this, 1st Battalion commander, Park Sung-hwan, committed suicide. This made members of 1st Siwi Regiment to not participate in disestablishment ceremony but, sparked a battle. Many soldiers from other regiments and battalions who already returned their weapons got their weapons and fought against the Imperial Japanese Army. The 2nd Siwi Regiment joined 1st Siwi Regiment for the battle. For four hours, battles was continued. However, the battle was the victory of Japan because Japanese soldiers using much advanced weapons.

== Commanders ==
Name	Date
Lieutenant colonel Cho Tong-yun	2 June 1898 - 11 November 1898
Lieutenant colonel Gwon Yong-guk	30 November 1898 - 4 August 1899
Colonel Kim Sung-gyu	18 August 1899 - 8 November 1899
Lieutenant colonel Yi Gi-dong	8 November 1899 - 20 November 1900
Lieutenant colonel Ku Yong-jo	26 November 1900 - 1 March 1901
Lieutenant colonel Ku Yong-jo	8 April 1902 - ?
Lieutenant colonel Yang Seong-hwan	1903 - 1904
Lieutenant colonel Yi Gun-hyeong	1904 - 1907
