= Cho Hŏn =

Korean official and commander (1544–1592)

- Hangul: 조헌
- Hanja: 趙憲
- RR: Jo Heon
- MR: Cho Hŏn

Art name
- Hangul: 중봉, 도원, 후율
- Hanja: 重峯, 陶原, 後栗
- RR: Jungbong, Dowon, Huyul
- MR: Chungbong, Towŏn, Huyul

Courtesy name
- Hangul: 여식
- Hanja: 汝式
- RR: Yeosik
- MR: Yŏsik

Posthumous name
- Hangul: 문열
- Hanja: 文烈
- RR: Munyeol
- MR: Munyŏl

Cho Hŏn (Korean: 조헌; Hanja: 趙憲, 1544 – 1592) was a Joseon official and militia leader in Korea at the time of the Imjin war. He believed that Japan under Toyotomi Hideyoshi posed a threat to Korean security, but his warnings were not heeded. When war broke out in 1592, he raised a volunteer militia to resist the Japanese invaders. He was killed during the second battle of Geumsan in 1592.

== Political career ==
Cho was a Yangban, and was educated by the Confucian Song Hon. After passing the Examination, he moved to Ok'chon. He was a member of the Western faction in the Joseon court. He was opposed to the Tongsinsa mission to Japan, as he believed Japanese regent, Toyotomi Hideyoshi to be a usurper, and thought Japan would soon attack Korea. He advocated launching a preemptive strike against Japan, but this suggestion was rejected.

== Outbreak of war ==
In 1592, Hideyoshi invaded Korea, quickly overwhelming the southern provinces and capturing Seoul. Cho set out raising a civilian militia to fight against the Japanese forces. In August, he received a message from Ko Kyŏngmyŏng, another civilian militia leader, who proposed that they join forces and recapture Seoul. Cho agreed to this plan and prepared to leave his current position Chungchong province to attack Seoul. However, Ko backed out when he found the Japanese intended to invade his home province; instead he attacked Geumsan during which he was killed.

== Battle of Chŏngju ==
Cho was an effective leader against the Japanese attack, using guerrilla warfare tactics at time to harass them.

Cho decided to attack the Japanese-occupied city of Chŏngju. He joined forces with the warrior monk leader Yonggyu, and moved to attack on 6 September 1592. The city was defended by a small Japanese force headed by Hachisuka Iemasa. Cho's forces took up positions outside the west gate. They defeated a small Japanese advance party, and approached the walls, but withdrew due to intense rain.

The Righteous army lit fires and raised flags around their positions, so the defenders would think that they were a much larger force. The Japanese forces were not prepared to defend Chongju, and withdrew that day. In the aftermath of the battle, the provincial governor Yun Son-gak filed an official report that did not credit Cho Hon's militia. They began to distrust Yonggyu's monk-soldiers and the government forces.

== Second battle of Geumsan and death ==
The Korean forces moved to attack Geumsan, where Ko Kyŏngmyŏng had been killed (Battle of Geumsan). The official government forces in Cholla province announced their intent to join the fight. Cho, resentful after his treatment in Yun Son-gak's report, announced that his militia would attack Geumsan alone, before any other Korean force did. He arrived at Geumsan on September 22.

Geumsan was defended by Kobayakawa Takakage. When he heard that the Korean force was small, he decided to attack rather than defend from the city. He sent part of his force out in the night to encircle Cho's positions, and then opened the gates and charged with his main force. Cho Hŏn, as well as every member of his militia, were killed. Their bodies were interred in a mound called the Tomb of the Seven Hundred Martyrs.

Yonggyu and his monk-soldiers attacked Geumsan in a third battle, in which he and all the monks were killed.
