= Pak Sŭnghwan =

Imperial Korean officer (1869–1907)

Pak Sŭnghwan 박승환
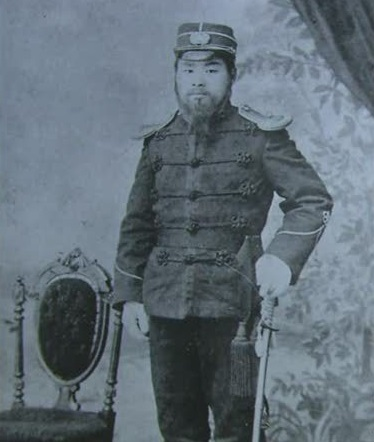
- Born: September 7, 1869; Hanseong, Gyeonggi, Korea
- Died: August 1, 1907 (aged 37); Hanseong, Gyeonggi, Korea
- Military career
- Allegiance: Korea
- Branch: Imperial Korean Army
- Service years: 1897 – 1907
- Rank: Major
- Known for: Organizing the Battle of Namdaemun

Pak Sŭnghwan (Korean: 박승환) was a Korean military officer and independence activist of the Korean Empire. After his suicide, he was known for instigating the Battle of Namdaemun as a response to the disbanding of the Korean military following the Japan–Korea Treaty of 1907 and the abdication of Emperor Gojong.

== Biography ==
He was born on September 7, 1869, in Hanseong, Gyeonggi as the eldest of three children of Park Joo-pyo and Namyang Hong.

In 1887, he took the exam in Mugwa and on September 28, 1896, he entered the Military Academy of Korean Empire. Yi Hak-gyun, the academy principal, was a nationalist who opposed Japanese influence, which influenced Pak's beliefs. He graduated on March 21, 1897, and was commissioned as a Second-Lieutenant in the Imperial Korean Guards. Afterwards, on November 11, 1899, he was promoted to the rank of lieutenant in the army and was appointed as the platoon commander of the 2nd Battalion of the 1st Siwi Regiment and on July 23, 1900, he was promoted to the rank of captain and took the command of the 1st company of the 1st Qinwi Regiment. Then on 14 August 1900 he took the command of company leader of the 1st Siwi Regiment. On 15 February 1904, Park was promoted to Major and became the 1st Battalion leader of 1st Siwi Regiment.

While serving as the 1st Battalion Commander of the 1st Siwi Regiment, he entered the palace when Emperor Gojong was forcibly taken away by the Japanese in 1907 and attempted to restore the throne, but he stopped because he was afraid of harming King Gojong. On August 1, 1907, he gathered officers above a battalion commander or higher at the Japanese military headquarters to disband the army. Pak then committed suicide with a pistol and wrote a suicide letter which read:

I couldn't defend my country as a soldier and I couldn't show my loyalty as a servant. Jongmyo Shrine and Sajik had already been destroyed, and the country's defense disappeared accordingly. Since I am a soldier, I cannot afford to live in peace.

When Pak's suicide became known, some of the soldiers of the 1st Chamryeong under him became enraged and started an anti-Japanese uprising, which led to the Battle of Namdaemun. After the uprising was put down, the Imperial Japanese government defamed Park's suicide. In 1909, An Jung-geun assassinated Itō Hirobumi at Harbin Station to avenge Pak's death.

=== Legacy ===
After his death, in 1962, he was posthumously awarded the Presidential Order of Merit for National Foundation by the Government of South Korea. In August 2003, he was selected as a national figure of South Korea.

=== Family ===
Pak had a son, Park Jeong-hup, and two grandchildren, Park Dae-jong and Park Wang-jong.

== In popular culture ==
His suicide and subsequent Battle of Namdaemun that it triggered are depicted in both the 1979 North Korean film An Jung Gun Shoots Ito Hirobumi and the 2018 Korean drama Mr Sunshine.
