= Kobayakawa =

Kobayakawa (written: 小早川) is a Japanese surname. Notable people with the surname include:

- Kobayakawa Hideaki (小早川 秀秋; 1577–1602), Japanese daimyō
- Kobayakawa Hidekane (小早川 秀包; 1566–1601), Japanese samurai
- Shiho Kobayakawa (小早川 志穂; born 1999), Japanese field hockey player
- Kobayakawa Takakage (小早川 隆景; 1533–1597), Japanese samurai and daimyō
- Takehiko Kobayakawa (小早川 毅彦; born 1961), Japanese former baseball player

== Fictional characters ==
- An Kobayakawa (小早川 杏), a character in the manga series World Trigger
- Miyuki Kobayakawa (小早川 美幸), protagonist of the manga series You're Under Arrest
- Saccho Kobayakawa (サッチョウ コバヤカワ), a character in the manga series Hunter × Hunter
- Sena Kobayakawa (小早川 瀬那), protagonist of the manga series Eyeshield 21
- Yutaka Kobayakawa (小早川 ゆたか), a character in the manga series Lucky Star

== See also ==
- Kobayakawa clan, a Japanese samurai clan
