= Yeonggyu =

Korean monk and commander (d. 1592)

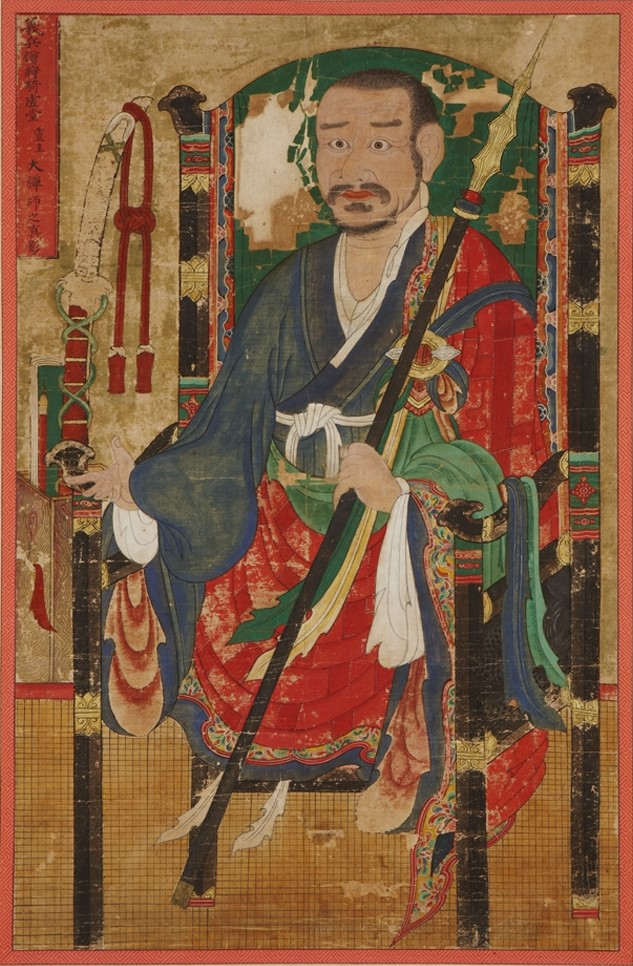

Korean name
- Hangul: 영규
- Hanja: 靈圭
- RR: Yeonggyu
- MR: Yŏnggyu

Yeonggyu (Korean: 영규, d. 1592) was a Korean Buddhist monk and militia leader who fought in the Imjin War. He was killed in the third battle of Geumsan in 1592.

== Life ==
Yeonggyu was an abbot who headed a Buddhist temple in Chungcheong province. In 1592, he received an appeal from Seosan Daesa, his former teacher, calling on him to resist the invasion force of Japanese regent Toyotomi Hideyoshi, which had landed at Busan.

Yeonggyu recruited monks into a militia to resist the invasion. His force joined with a righteous army led by Cho Hŏn. Together, they took the fortress of Cheongju from the Japanese.

Cho and Yeonggyu planned to recapture the capital from the Japanese, but their officers instead argued they should attack Geumsan, a town the Japanese commander Ankokuji Ekei was planning to turn into a fortress. The two leaders assented and moved to liberate Geumsan.

Cho Hŏn's forces attacked on 22 September, but all were killed, including their leader. Yeonggyu's forces attacked in the days after. He too was killed, and the battle ended in a Korean defeat.

== Legacy ==
Yeonggyu's monk fighters and Cho Hŏn's volunteers are commemorated by a shrine on the site of the battles of Geumsan. Yeonggyu was posthumously awarded with the post of T'ongchong Taebu by the Korean court.
