= Battle of Namdaemun =

1907 insurgency in Korea against Japan

Battle of Namdaemun (Battle of the South Great Gate)
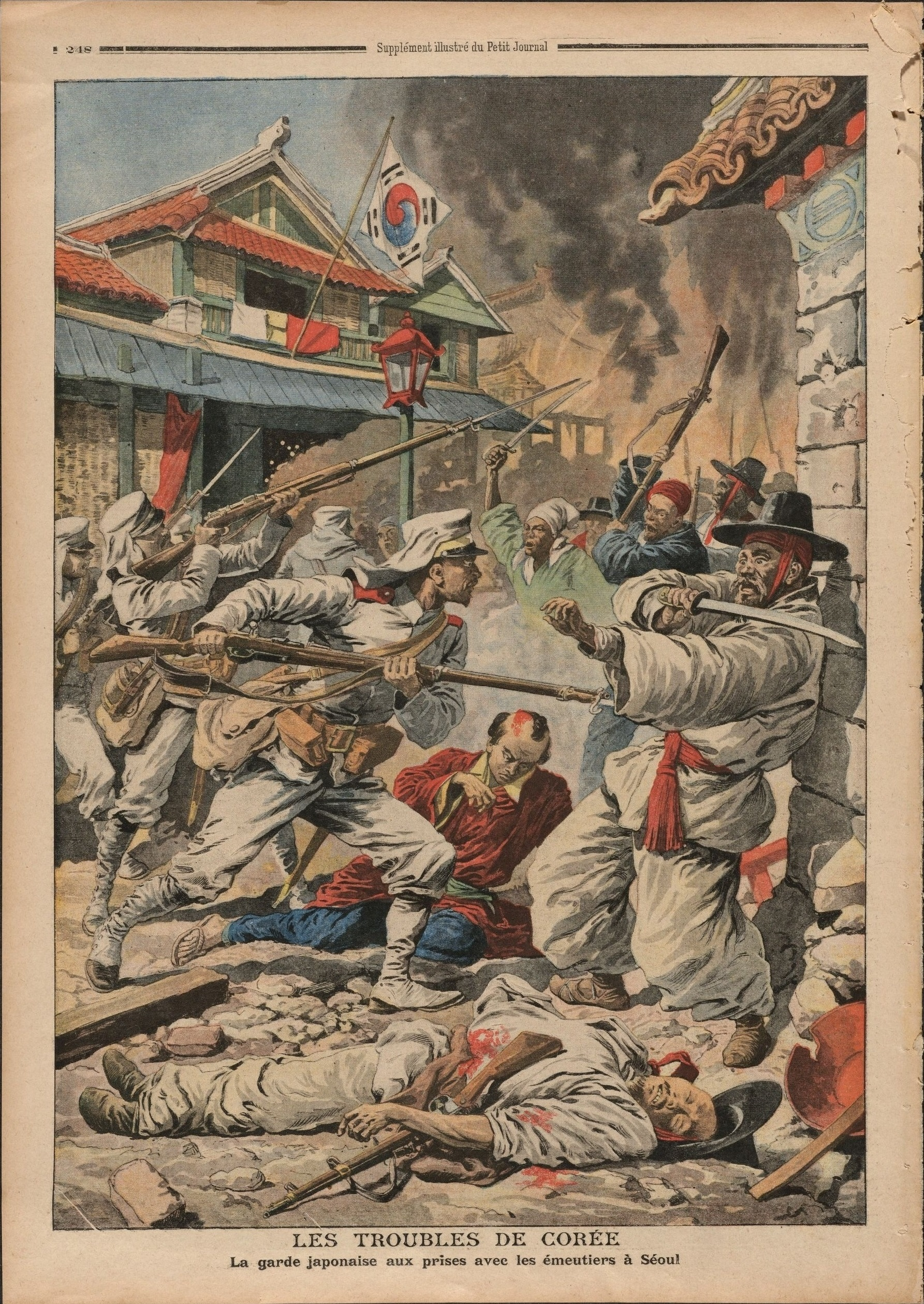
- Contemporary French artistic depiction of the Battle of Namdaemun, showing Korean and Japanese soldiers in a heated contest.
Date	1 August 1907
Location	Namdaemun Gate, Seoul, Korea
Result	Japanese victory

Belligerents
Japan	Korea

Commanders and leaders
Ito Hirobumi	Lieutenant General Nam Sang-deok †

Strength
Imperial Japanese Armed Forces: 1,100 (approx.)	Imperial Korean Armed Forces: 1,200 (approx.) (Note: which were part of Mixed Siwi Brigade)

Casualties and losses
4 dead, 40 wounded	13 officers, 57 soldiers killed Other sources: 68 soldiers killed, over 100 wounded, 516 POWs

- Battle of Namdaemun
- Hangul: 남대문 전투
- Hanja: 南大門戰鬪
- RR: Namdaemun jeontu
- MR: Namdaemun chŏnt'u

The Battle of Namdaemun (Korean: 남대문 전투), also known as the Battle of the South Great Gate, was a rebellion by the Korean army against Japanese forces in Korea as a reaction to the disbandment of the Korean army following the Japan–Korea Treaty of 1907. It took place at the Namdaemun Gate in Seoul on August 1, 1907. Under the pretext of the Hague Secret Emissary Incident, the Japanese coerced Emperor Gojong into abdicating and imposed the Eulsa Treaty. When some armed soldiers joined the protests against Emperor Gojong's abdication, the Japanese hastened the disbandment of the military. At midnight on July 31, they threatened the royal court and issued an imperial decree for the disbandment of the military, followed by the disbandment ceremony the next day. Although the military of the Korean Empire resisted, they were suppressed. The disbandment of the military symbolized the practical downfall of the Korean Empire. As soldiers from disbanded units joined the independence army, the anti-Japanese armed resistance unfolded in earnest.

== Background ==
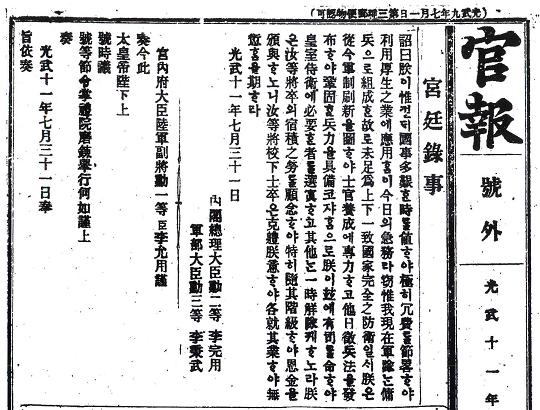
The military disbandment ordinance issued on July 31, 1907.

In 1906, the 44th year of Gojong's reign, Ito Hirobumi was installed as the first Japanese Resident-General of Korea. As Imperial Japan hurried to annex Korea outright, Gojong attempted to appeal to world leaders by sending a secret delegation to the Hague Convention of 1907. The Japanese soon discovered Gojong's plan in 1907. They forced him through pro-Japanese ministers affiliated with the Iljinhoe to either go to Japan and apologize to the Emperor or General Hasegawa in front of the Korean Gate. On July 16th, the pro-Japanese cabinet met with the Emperor. It demanded that he sign the Eulsa Treaty to stabilize the country, apologize to the Japanese Emperor, and abdicate the throne. Gojong refused to resign many times. Finally, that day, Gojong declared that he would pass the throne to his son. The abdication ceremony took place the next day, July 20th. Gojong chose the date and added, "Follow the temporary regulations (權停例)." (Note: From "The Annals of Gojong, July 19, 1907") The temporary regulations refer to a simplified ritual performed by the monarch without sitting on the throne. The Emperor's abdication ceremony took place without Gojong or Sunjong. (Note: "Thousands of people gathered in front of the palace in the morning, and the shops closed and expressed condolences." (From a telegram from the Resident-General's Office, 2:45 pm, July 19, 1907))

=== Opposing the abdication ===
On July 19, 1907, in Jongno, where intense crowds opposing the abdication of Emperor Gojong were demonstrating, approximately 100 armed soldiers from the 1st Battalion, 3rd Company, of the Jeongdong Garrison who had a high reputation and was designated as an anti-Japanese unit, and the 2nd Battalion, 3rd Company, under the command of Im Jae-deok, who was known for his anti-Japanese activities joined the Capital Guards. They attacked the Jongno Police Substation, resulting in clashes with Japanese police and the killing of numerous Japanese police officers and around ten Japanese merchants. This incident demonstrated that the military of the Korean Empire, which had already transcended the limitations of a colonial force and transformed into a patriotic military with a keen national understanding, was growing into a resistance group capable of thwarting Japanese aggression.

Surprised by the uprising, the Japanese military immediately contacted their homeland and ordered the deployment of combat units from the 12th Division to essential regions such as Daegu and Pyongyang. Meanwhile, they concentrated the 13th Division in Seoul throughout the country. They also docked three patrol boats in Incheon and deployed the 2nd Fleet along the Korean coast, completing the deployment of Japanese forces for the dissolution of the Korean military by July 31.

=== Sunjong dissolves the military ===
On July 20, 1907, Gojong was dethroned. Some officials, such as Park Yung-hyo, and Yi Do-jae, tried to assassinate the members of cabinet of Ye Wanyong, who led the abdication. After abdicating, Emperor Gojong was confined to his palace Deoksugung, and the Japanese replaced him with his son, Sunjong. They then forced Sunjong to sign the Jeongmi Treaty of 1907. The treaty disbanded the Armed Forces of the Korean Empire, which was the last remaining military force of the Korean Empire. Then, in the midnight of July 31, while threatening negotiations, they issued an imperial decree ordering the dissolution of the military, and at the same time, commissioned Ito Hirobumi under the name of Yi Wan-yong to thoroughly suppress any potential uprising of the Korean military that might occur during the dissolution of the military.

== Disbandment ceremony ==
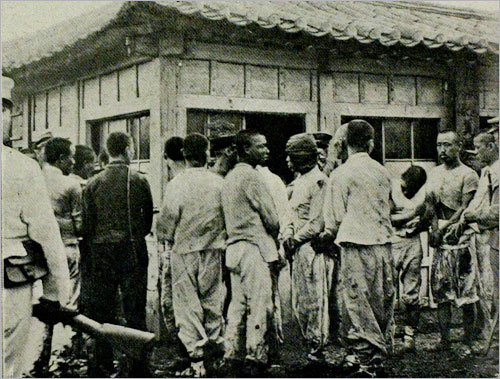
The Imperial Korean Armed Forces being disarmed by the Japanese army at the time of the disbandment.

On August 1, at 8 am, the military dissolution ceremony was held at the Dongdaemun Training Center. However, the soldiers were deceived into believing that they would receive unarmed combat training at the training center. Under the leadership of unit commanders and Japanese officers, they were gathered at the training center unarmed. However, the 1st Battalion, 1st Company, and the 2nd Battalion, 1st Company, were absent. While the messengers were being dispatched back and forth, gunshots were heard from the direction of Namdaemun, prompting a hurried dissolution ceremony. Furthermore, the Japanese gave the soldiers a small amount of banknotes under the guise of "gratitude money" (eunsageum). Upon receiving this money, the soldiers finally realized the true nature of the situation and felt a deep despair. However, they had already been completely disarmed, and with the heavily armed Japanese troops surrounding the training center from multiple directions, they were left with no options. Using similar deceptive methods, the Japanese military dissolved all regional units from August 3 to September 3, starting with the Bukcheong Garrison.

== Uprising ==
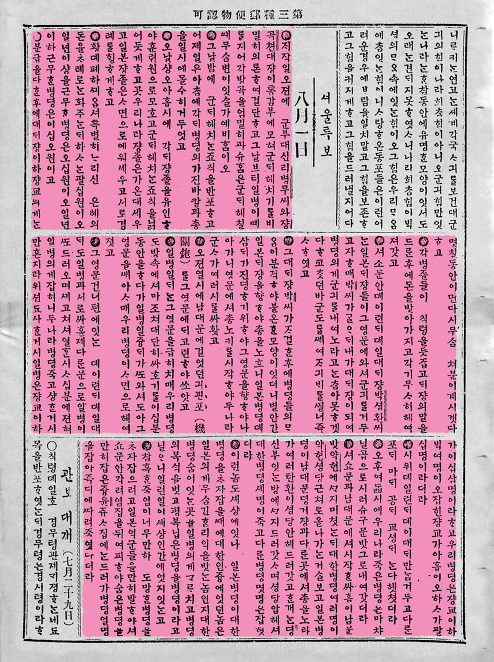
This is an excerpt related to the Battle of Namdaemun from an article published by the Kyunghyang Shinmun on August 9, 1907.

The dissolution of the military was forcefully carried out by the massive deployment of Japanese forces and the treacherous acts of the pro-Japanese government. However, strong resistance arose from the first day. In particular, the soldiers' resistance from the 1st Battalion, 1st Company, and the 2nd Battalion, 1st Company, in Namdaemun and Changgyeonggung Palace was the most shining example of the Korean soldiers' anti-Japanese struggle. Park Seung-hwan's 1st Battalion (unarmed 1st Siwi Regiment) was stationed on the west side of Namdaemun Gate. On August 1 at 8:00 am, using the excuse of recruits, he refused to comply with the order to disband and sent Major Kim Jae-heup in his place. When Kim Jae-heup returned and reported that the order to disperse had been issued, Park gathered all the battalion commanders and ordered them to return all weapons to the arsenal. The 1st Battalion was about to depart for the training center where the disbandment ceremony was to take place.

The 1st Battalion Commander Major Park Seung-hwan (1869–1907) wrote a note on a paper in protest against the disbandment of the armed forces,

I couldn't defend my country as a soldier nor show my loyalty as a servant. Jongmyo Shrine and Sajik had already been destroyed, and the country's defense disappeared accordingly. Since I am a soldier, I cannot afford to live in peace.

Then Park committed suicide by shooting himself. In addition to Park Seung-hwan, two soldiers from the 2nd Battalion, 1st Brigade, Wu Yi-sun Jeong Gyo, and one private soldier also sacrificed themselves. Park Seung-hwan's cry of "Long live the Great Korean Empire" and a gunshot echoed through the ranks of the Seoul Capital Guards 1st Division.

The responsibility of the officers leading soldiers who were willing to sacrifice their lives for the anti-Japanese struggle due to their strong national consciousness, even with the slightest provocation, was truly burdensome. The soldiers, who had disarmed and were heading to the training center, intended to receive unarmed combat training. His suicide enraged the soldiers; they collectively rebelled against the Japanese officers who were leading them, and they rushed to the arsenal, extorting ammunition and armaments. The arsenal was quickly destroyed, and the soldiers armed themselves with justice.

Next to the 1st Battalion of the Seoul Capital Guards 1st Infantry Regiment, there was the 1st Battalion of the 2nd Infantry Regiment inside Sungnyemun Gate. They responded with cheers when they heard the news of Park Seung-hwan's sacrifice around Seosomun Gate. The soldiers of the 2nd Infantry Regiment also broke into the arsenal and armed themselves. The 2nd Infantry Regiment was where Lieutenant Colonel Lee Ki-pyo, the former commander, had been dismissed a few days earlier.

They arranged sentries around the barracks and started to open fire with guns against the Japanese army. The Japanese army immediately launched an attack on the 1st and 2nd Infantry Regiment upon hearing the gunshots. However, the 2nd Infantry Regiment, commanded by Lieutenant General Nam Sang-deok and 2nd Lieutenant Yi Juyoung, counterattacked fiercely and repelled the Japanese.

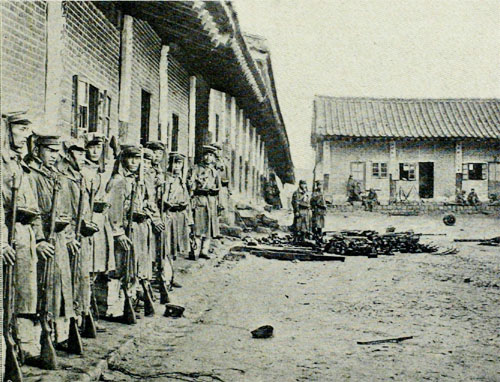
The Japanese army suppressed the uprising and occupied the barracks.

In response, around 9:30 am, the Imperial Japanese Army had its 51st Infantry Regiment's first, second, and third battalions installed three machine guns on the rampart of Sungnyemun, the upper floor of Namdaemun Gate and utilized artillery to carry out a frontal assault. Leading the Japanese army was Kajihara, who had earned the nickname "Goblin Commander" by killing 19 enemy soldiers during the Russo-Japanese War. However, in the face of the brave resistance of the Korean army, he kneeled and was killed. The Japanese army threw bombs into the Korean army's camp and suppressed the resistance of the 2nd Infantry Regiment of the Capital Guards force. It was a fierce battle that lasted for three hours. Meanwhile, the resistance of the 1st Infantry Regiment continued until 11:40 am, lasting for a total of four hours. However, eventually running out of ammunition, the Korean army could not hold its ground. Because of the vastly inferior armaments of the Korean army, the battle ended in a Japanese victory, with Japan capturing the army base.

== Aftermath ==
The Japanese army lost four soldiers, including Captain Kajihara and Special Operations Chief Kumamoto and Sergeant Harano, and 40 wounded, while the Korean army had 13 officers and 57 soldiers killed in action. However, the high number of casualties on the Korean side was not due to the battle itself but rather occurred during search operations. Several sources suggest that 68 soldiers were killed, over 100 were injured, and 516 became prisoners of war. Nam Sang-deok, who commanded the disbanded soldiers, was killed. The Japanese army searched for Korean soldiers hiding in civilian homes, and hundreds of houses were burned. According to the accounts of this reporter, there were numerous acts of brutality and atrocities during the turmoil in Seoul. Shells hit civilians, and one Korean soldier in the Soseomun area was reportedly stabbed with more than 20 bayonet thrusts. Furthermore, not all Korean soldiers were reported as possessing firearms. (Note: <<Records of the Japanese Legation>>, Class A Documents, August 1st, 1907, Battle Report, Battle near Namdaemun Gate, detailed account.)

Injured soldiers of the Korean Empire flocked to Severance Hospital, one of the few medical institutions at the time. The wounded soldiers were treated by medical staff operated by an American doctor Oliver Avison. A few days after the battle ended, Ito visited the hospital, and then there was contact from the Japanese army. It was a notice to transfer the wounded to a Japanese hospital. Avison said, "Both the wounded soldiers and the Korean nurses were afraid." (Note: Oliver Avison, 'Modern Korea: 42 Years')

=== Jinwidae uprisings ===
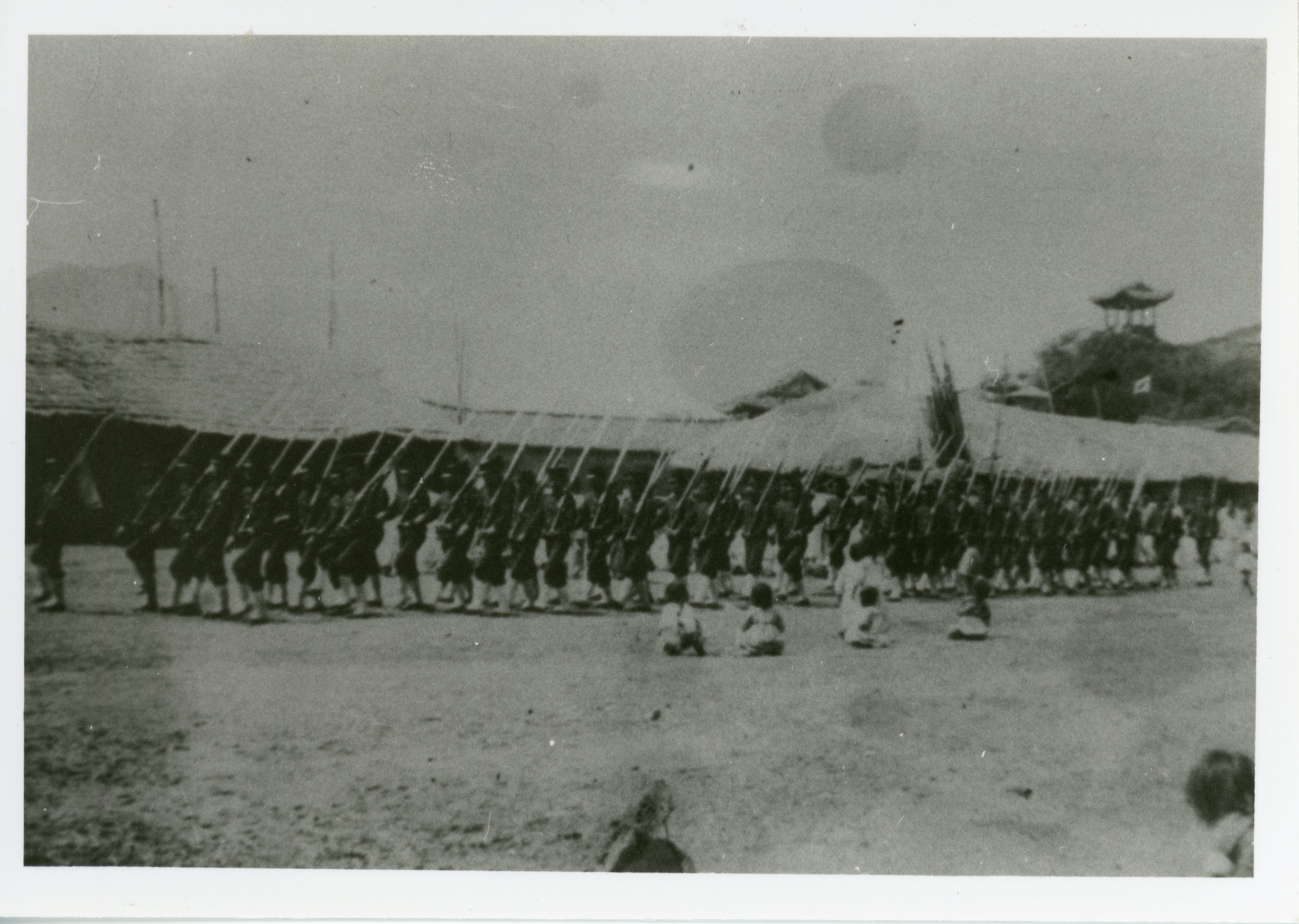
Jinwidae in Tongyoung before dissolution

Although the resistance of the Seoul Capital Guards 1st Division lasted only one day, the Battle of Namdaemun against Japan sparked the desire to resist the dissolution of the Korean army. The situation escalated significantly as news spread to regional troops. This resistance was also evident during the dissolution of regional units. When Wonju Jinwidae Commander Hong U-hyeong became aware that his subordinate soldiers would rise against the Japanese, he fled in fear. Still, he later returned to lead the Japanese troops and suppress his unit, ordering its dissolution.

However, another Jinwidae officer, Min Geun-ho, led a unit of 250 soldiers and fought against the Japanese, becoming a core force of the Gwandong Volunteers (Gwandong Uibyeong). The Ganghwa Jinwidae unit, upon hearing news of the dissolution from Seoul, collaborated with members of the Jiganghoe (Self-Strengthening Society) in Ganghwa. Figures such as Yu Myeong-gyu, Yeon Gi-u, and Ji Hong-yun played a central role in overcoming the restrictions imposed by the officers, attacking the Japanese police substation, killing Japanese spies, and assassinating prominent members of the Iljinhoe (One Advance Society), Jeong Gyeong-su. Afterward, they became a vital force for the rebels in the Haeseo and Gyeonggi regions.

== Legacy ==
The dissolution of the military was a tragic event that symbolized the practical demise of the Korean Empire. However, it holds significant meaning in the history of the anti-Japanese national liberation struggle as it led to an expansion of guerrilla warfare in a different form than before. Firstly, the dissolution of regional Jinwidae units resulted in the significant expansion of areas involved in guerrilla activities. Secondly, guerrilla leaders from lower-ranking soldiers replaced the traditional educated leaders, transforming the nature of the guerrilla forces. Thirdly, with the strategic command of dissolved soldiers, the combat techniques of guerrilla warfare improved, dealing a severe blow to the Japanese forces. Thus, the dissolution of the military served as a turning point, leading to a full-fledged armed struggle against the Japanese.

=== Analysis ===
The rifles possessed by the Korean army were outdated and had weak firepower, while the Japanese army used modern rifles, machine guns, and grenades, giving them overwhelming firepower. Nevertheless, despite these unfavorable conditions, the Korean army fought heroically, never ceasing their resistance against the enemy. For several days afterward, the Japanese refrained from speaking about Korea and the Korean people, showing respect.

From an international point of view, the battle was a small combat action because of the small size of the Korean forces. Indeed, Korean soldiers numbered only 3,000 during this battle. On the other hand, this event was necessary from a Korean national point of view because almost all of the capital guards were committed to it. There were 20,000 Korean soldiers in the country and only 4,000 in the capital city.

=== The Righteous Army ===
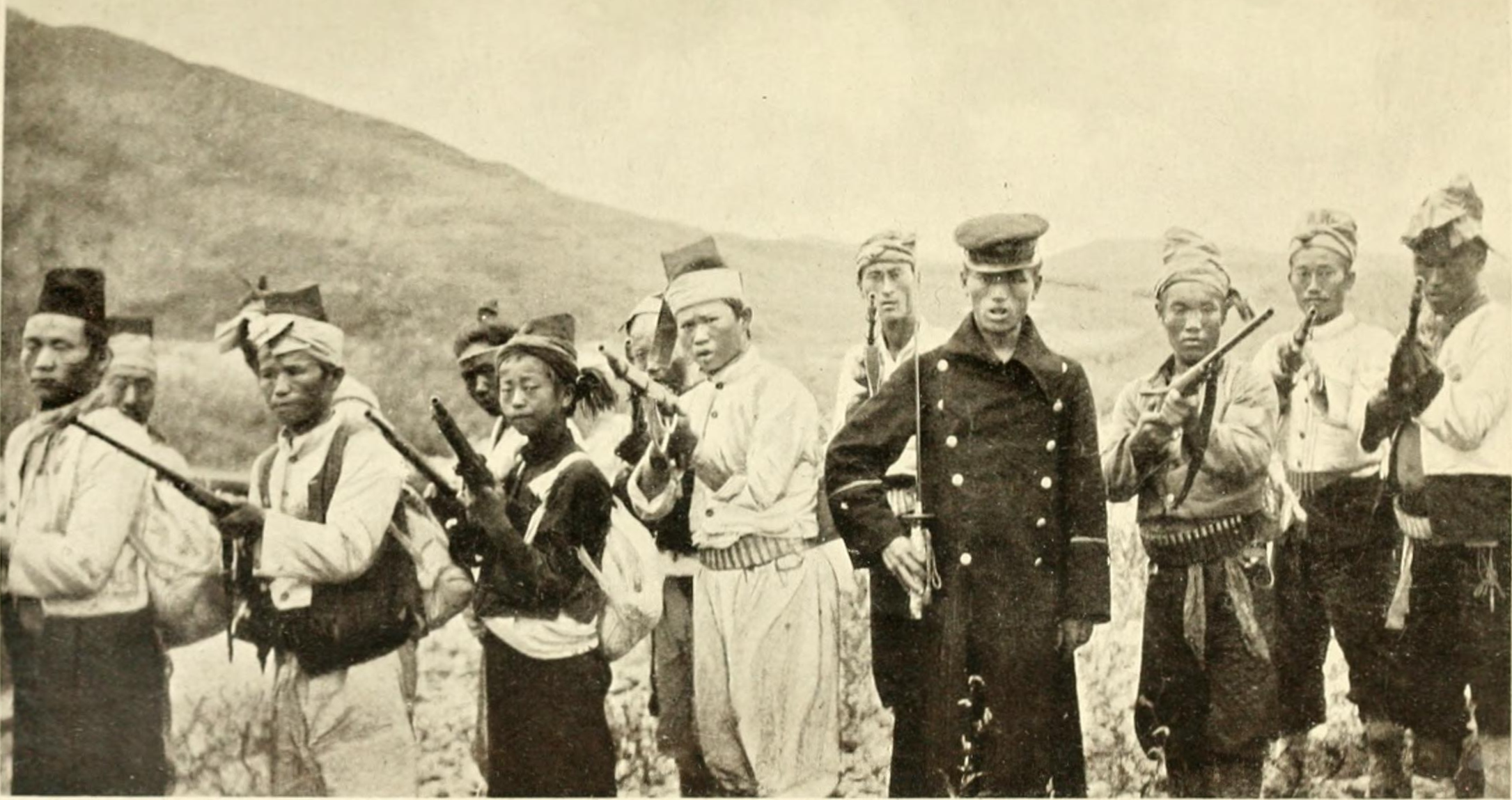
Righteous army of Jeongmi (1907); the man dressed in all-black is an Imperial Korean Army soldier.

Before the Battle of Namdaemun, the Righteous Army mainly comprised poor peasants, fishers, tiger hunters, miners, merchants, and laborers; a significant part of the Imperial Korean Armed Forces kept resisting outside Seosomun Gate. After the Battle of Namdaemun, many regular army members joined the Righteous armies in 1907. Together, they solidified a foundation for the Righteous Armies' Battle of 1907, which led to the Anti-Japanese War of the Righteous Armies.

=== Current site ===
A geographical map of Gyeongseong in 1903 shows that the Barracks of the 1st Battalion (currently 120 in Seosomun-dong) and the Barracks of the 2nd Battalion (now 34 in Nanchang-dong) were located in the southeast of Seosomun Gate and Sungnyemun Gate, respectively. Seosomun and Sungnyemun are the places where the street battle exploded. This site now corresponds to the current Korea Chamber of Commerce and Industry.

== Cultural references ==
- An Jung Gun Shoots Ito Hirobumi (1979 North Korean film)
- Mr. Sunshine (2018 Korean drama)

== See also ==
- Hague Secret Emissary Affair
- Itō Hirobumi
- Ye Wanyong
- Sunjong of Korea
- Japan–Korea Treaty of 1907
- Unequal treaty
- Righteous army
- Korean independence movement
