= Hwang Jin =

Korean general (1550–1593)

- Hangul: 황진
- Hanja: 黃進
- RR: Hwang Jin
- MR: Hwang Chin

Courtesy name
- Hangul: 명보
- Hanja: 明甫
- RR: Myeongbo
- MR: Myŏngbo

Posthumous name
- Hangul: 무민
- Hanja: 武愍
- RR: Mumin
- MR: Mumin

Hwang Jin (Korean: 황진; Hanja: 黃進, 1550–1593) was a general during Japanese invasions of Korea. His courtesy name was Myeongbo and his posthumous name was Mumin. He is best known for his defense at the castle of Jinju at the Siege of Jinju (1593). There were two battles of Jinju, the first was a great victory for the Koreans while at the second, the Japanese captured the castle, with Hwang Jin and the entire Korean garrison killed. Hwang Jin was killed by two arquebuse bullets.

== The battle ==
Hwang Jin commanded the castle of Jinju during Japanese invasions of Korea. In July 1593, the castle had around 3,800 Koreans, including irregular soldiers and civilians. Around mid July, Japanese commanders including Katō Kiyomasa, Ukita Hideie, and Konishi Yukinaga marched an army of 30,000 to Jinju. The Japanese were anxious to win a victory, as Toyotomi Hideyoshi was not happy with the results of the first battle.

As the Japanese approached, Korean soldiers straggled toward the walls seeking protection of the castle. When Hwang Jin saw this he realized he could not open the gates. If he did, the Japanese would swarm in and capture the fort. As a result, the commander of the reinforcements charged with over a hundred men and they were shot down by the muskets of the Japanese.

Although heartbroken from these events, Hwang Jin ordered his garrison to defend the castle. As the Japanese raised scaling ladders under cover of arquebusiers, the Koreans dumped rocks and hot burning oil on the Japanese. The Koreans also returned fire with bows, mortars, and arquebuses. Unfortunately, when the Japanese brought in siege towers, the Koreans were unable to resist.

Hwang Jin is famous in Korea for his outstanding defenses and the ability to command. He was also known famous for having survived 2 bullets until he died of his wounds. After six days Hwang Jin was shot in the chest by 2 bullets and at morning the siege was over. His subordinates came and found him gasping and breathing and looking tired. Then still holding his sword Hwang Jin died. He was 43 years old when he died. Morale crumbled with his death and Jinju castle soon fell to the Japanese invaders.

After the war, King Seonjo granted a posthumous conferment of honors.

== See also ==
- Japanese invasions of Korea (1592–1598)
- Siege of Jinju (1593)
