= Bae (surname) =

- Hangul: 배
- Hanja: 裵
- RR: Bae
- MR: Pae

Bae, also spelled Bai, Pae or Pay, is a Korean family name. The South Korean census of 2015 found 400,641 people by this surname, or less than 1% of the population. In a study by the National Institute of the Korean Language based on 2007 application data for South Korean passports, it was found that 96.8% of people with this family name spelled it in Latin letters as Bae. Rarer alternative spellings (the remaining 3.2%) included Pae, Bai, Pai, Pay, and Bea.

There are two different ways to write the name in hanja: the most common (裵), and an alternative (裴) which lacks the "stem" (亠, Radical 8) at the top. The most common character is also used to write the Chinese surname Pei, which is also the origin of the Vietnamese surname Bùi.

== Notable people ==
=== Bae ===
- Bae Beom-geun (born 1993), South Korean retired professional footballer
- Bae Bien-u (born 1950), South Korean photographer
- Bae Chan-soo (born 1998), South Korean footballer
- Bae Chang-ho (born 1953), South Korean director and screenwriter
- Bae Cheol-soo (born 1953), South Korean radio host and former singer
- Bae Chun-suk (born 1990), South Korean footballer
- Bae Da-bin (born 1993), South Korean actress
- Bae Dae-won (born 1988), South Korean footballer
- Bae Doona (born 1979), South Korean actress and photographer
- Bae Eun-hye (born 1982), South Korean judoka
- Bae Eun-mi (born 1973), South Korean gymnast
- Bae Eun-sik, South Korean actor
- Bae Geu-rin (born 1989), South Korean actress
- Bae Hae-min (born 1988), South Korean footballer
- Bae Hae-sun (born 1974), South Korean actress
- Bae Hyun-jin (born 1983), South Korean broadcaster and politician
- Bae Hyun-sung (born 1999), South Korean actor
- Bae Il-hwan (born 1988), South Korean retired footballer
- Bae In-hyuk (born 1998), South Korean actor
- Bae Jae-jung (born 1968), South Korean politician
- Bae Jae-woo (born 1993), South Korean professional footballer
- Bae Jeong-min (born 1975), South Korean voice actress
- Ji-hwan Bae (born 1999), South Korean baseball player
- Bae Jin-seok (born 1978), South Korean boxer
- Bae Jin-sol (born 2004), South Korean singer, member of girl group NMIXX
- Bae Jin-young (stage name Punch, born 1993), South Korean singer
- Bae Jin-young (born 2000), South Korean singer and actor, former member of boy groups CIX and Wanna One
- Bae Jong-ok (born 1964), South Korean actress
- Bae Joo-hyun (stage name Irene, born 1991), South Korean singer and actress, leader of girl group Red Velvet
- Bae Jun-ho (born 2003), South Korean professional footballer
- Bae Jun-seo (born 2000), South Korean taekwondo practitioner
- Kenneth Bae (born 1968), American missionary held as prisoner in North Korea
- Bae Ki-jong (born 1983), South Korean football player
- Bae Ki-suk (1987–2010), South Korean boxer
- Bae Ki-sung (born 1972), South Korean singer and radio presenter
- Bae Min-hee (born 1988), South Korean handball player
- Bae Myung-hoon (born 1978), South Korean science fiction writer
- Bae Nam-ju (born 1965), South Korean former professional tennis player
- Bae Noo-ri (born 1993), South Korean actress
- Bae Sang-moon (born 1986), South Korean professional golfer
- Bae Se-hwa (born 1980), South Korean artist
- Bae Seong-woo (born 1972), South Korean actor
- Bae Seul-ki (born 1986), South Korean singer
- Bae Seung-hee (born 1983), South Korean badminton player
- Bae Seung-jin (born 1987), South Korean footballer
- Bae Sin-yeong (born 1992), South Korean professional footballer
- Bae So-hee (born 1993), South Korean sport shooter
- Bae So-ra (born 1991), South Korean field hockey player
- Bae Soo-bin (born 1976), South Korean actor
- Bae Soo-bin (stage name Chae Soo-bin, born 1994), South Korean actress
- Bae Soo-yong (born 1998), South Korean footballer
- Bae Suah (born 1965), South Korean writer and translator
- Bae Sung-duk (born 1970), South Korean sport shooter
- Bae Sung-jae (born 1978), South Korean television personality
- Bae Sung-woo (stage name Tak Jae-hoon, born 1968), South Korean entertainer
- Bae Suzy (born 1994), South Korean singer and actress
- Bae Woo-hee (born 1991), South Korean singer and actress, member of girl group Dal Shabet
- Bae Yeon-ju (born 1990), South Korean badminton player
- Bae Yong-joon (born 1972), South Korean businessman and actor
- Bae Yong-kyun (born 1951), South Korean film director, painter, professor
- Bae Yoo-na (born 1989), South Korean volleyball player
- Bae Yoo-ram (born 1986), South Korean actor
- Bae Yoon-kyung (born 1993), South Korean actress
- Bae Young-soo (born 1981), South Korean baseball player

=== Pae ===
- Pae Chung-son (fl. 13th century), Korean general
- Daniel Pae (born 1995), American politician
- Pae Gil-su (born 1972), North Korean gymnast
- Pae Hŭngnip (1546–1608), Joseon naval officer
- Mark Pae (1926–2013), South Korean Anglican bishop
- Pae Tal-jun (born 1936), North Korean politician and bureaucrat

== See also ==
- Korean name
