= Joshua Siegel =

Joshua or Josh Siegel may refer to:

- Joshua E. Siegel (born 1988), American mechanical engineer, inventor, and entrepreneur
- Joshua A. Siegel (born 1966), American orthopaedic surgeon
- Joshua Siegel (politician) (born 1993), American politician, member of the Pennsylvania House of Representatives
