= Myung-hoon =

- Hangul: 명훈
- RR: Myeonghun
- MR: Myŏnghun

Myung-hoon, also spelled Myung-hun, is a Korean given name.

People with this name include:

- Myung-whun Chung (born 1953), South Korean pianist and conductor
- Ri Myung-hun (born 1967), North Korean basketball player
- Choi Myung-hoon (born 1975), South Korean professional Go player
- Bae Myung-hoon (born 1978), South Korean science fiction writer
- Chun Myung-hoon (born 1978), South Korean singer, member of NRG
- Shin Myung-hoon (born 1981), South Korean amateur boxer
- Lee Myung-hoon (actor) (born 1989), South Korean actor
- Jung Myung-hoon (born 1991), South Korean StarCraft player

Fictional characters with this name include:

- Shin Myung-hun, in 2008 South Korean television series East of Eden

== See also ==
- List of Korean given names
