= Battle of Myeongnyang =

1597 Japan–Korea naval battle

- Part of the Imjin War
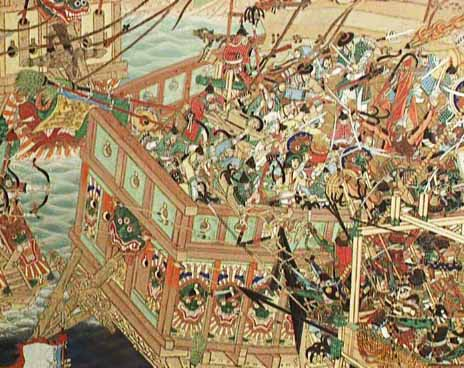
- 20th century depiction
Date	October 26, 1597 (September 16 according to Chinese lunisolar calendar, September 13 according to Korean lunisolar calendar)
Location	Myeongnyang Strait, near Jindo Island 34°34′06″N 126°18′28″E
Result	Joseon victory

Belligerents
Japan: Fleet of Toyotomi Hideyoshi	Joseon: Joseon Navy

Commanders and leaders
Tōdō Takatora (WIA); Katō Yoshiaki; Kurushima Michifusa †; Wakizaka Yasuharu; Mōri Takamasa; Kan Michinaga; Kuki Yoshitaka	Yi Sun-sin; Kim Ŏkch'u; Kim Ŭngham; An Wi; Song Yŏchong; Pae Hŭngnip

Strength
133-330 warships	13 warships 32 scouting ships (Yi's report, likely did not participate in combat)

Casualties and losses
31 ships rammed open More than 30 ships destroyed (Hawley); About 30 ships destroyed (Lewis); Half of the elders (Tōdō clan memoirs). Half of the Japanese (prisoner's testimony)	No ships lost At least 2 killed and 3 wounded aboard Yi Sun-sin's flagship (Yi's record); At least 8 drowned from An Wi's ship

- Battle of Myeongnyang
- Hangul: 명량 대첩
- Hanja: 鳴梁大捷
- RR: Myeongnyang daecheop
- MR: Myŏngnyang taech'ŏp

The Battle of Myeongnyang was fought on October 26, 1597 between the Joseon Navy led by Admiral Yi Sun-sin and the Japanese navy in the Myeongnyang Strait, near Jindo Island, off the southwest corner of the Korean Peninsula. With only 13 ships remaining from Admiral Wŏn Kyun's disastrous defeat at the Battle of Chilcheollyang, Admiral Yi held the strait as a "last stand" battle against the Japanese navy, who were sailing to support their land army's advance towards the Joseon capital of Hanyang (modern-day Seoul).

The actual numeric strength of the Japanese fleet that Admiral Yi fought is unclear; Korean sources indicate 120 to 133 ships participated in combat, with an unknown number sitting out, up to 330 in total. Regardless of the size of the Japanese fleet, all sources indicate that the Japanese ships heavily outnumbered the Korean ships, by at least a ten-to-one ratio.

In total 31 Japanese warships were sunk or crippled during the battle. Tōdō Takatora, one of the commanders of the Japanese navy, was wounded during the battle and many others were killed. The result overall was a humiliating naval defeat for the Japanese. Even after their victory, however, the Joseon navy was still outnumbered by the remaining Japanese forces, so Admiral Yi withdrew to the Yellow Sea to resupply his fleet and have more space for a mobile defense. After the Korean navy withdrew, the Japanese navy made an incursion into the western coast of Korea, near some islands in modern-day Yeonggwang County.

== Background ==
Due to Japanese intrigue taking advantage of the fractious politics of the Joseon Dynasty court, Admiral Yi Sun-sin had previously been impeached and almost put to death. He was instead tortured and demoted to the rank of a common soldier. Yi's rival, Admiral Wŏn Kyun, took command of the Joseon fleet, which under Yi's careful management had grown from 63 heavy warships to 166.

Wŏn Kyun was an incompetent naval commander who immediately began squandering the Joseon navy's strength through ill-conceived maneuvers against the Japanese naval base at Busan. In the Battle of Chilcheollyang, the Japanese navy, with Tōdō Takatora in overall command, outmaneuvered the Joseon navy and virtually wiped it out. Soon afterwards, the Japanese reinforced their garrisons in Busan and various forts on the southern coast of Korea, and began the second invasion.

With the Joseon navy taken out of the scene, the Japanese believed that they now had free access to the Yellow Sea and could resupply their troops through this sea route as they advanced northward. Five years earlier, in the 1592 campaigns, Admiral Yi prevented the Japanese from resupplying their troops in this manner and kept their ships holed up at their main bases in Busan harbor.

During the second invasion, the Japanese laid siege and captured the city of Namwon in September 26 as well as fought the Ming Chinese army to a standstill in Jiksan on September 7. The Japanese army then awaited supplies and reinforcements from their navy, who would need to enter the Yellow Sea to reach the western coast of Korea. The army, thus supported by their navy, planned to make a major push to recapture Hanyang (modern Seoul).

== Prelude ==
Admiral Yi Sun-sin was hastily reinstated as Supreme Commander of the Regional Navies after Wŏn Kyun was killed at the Battle of Chilcheollyang. Yi initially only had 10 panokseon ships at his disposal, which had been saved by Gyeongsang Right Naval Commander Pae Sŏl, who retreated early in the Battle of Chilcheollyang. Pae Sŏl had originally saved 12 ships, but lost two while on his retreat towards Hoeryongpo. Two ships were brought by newly appointed Jeolla Right Naval Commander Kim Ŏkch'u, and by the time of the battle, Yi had acquired another warship, likely one of the two that Pae Sŏl had previously lost. Thus, in total, Yi had 13 warships. Although Yi only found 120 men initially, some of the survivors of Chilcheollyang rallied to him, and he had at least 1,500 sailors and marines by the end of September.

At that time, King Seonjo, who judged that the Joseon navy had lost its power and would never be restored again, sent a letter to disband the navy and have its men join the ground forces under General Kwon Yul. Admiral Yi responded with his own letter, stating: "Your majesty, this vassal still has twelve battleships (今臣戰船 尙有十二, 지금 신에게는 아직도 열두 척의 전선이 있습니다). ... Even though our navy is small, as long as I live the enemy will not dare to look down on us (戰船雖寡 微臣不死 則不敢侮我矣, 비록 전선의 수가 적으나 미천한 신이 아직 죽지 아니하였으니 왜적들이 감히 우리를 업신여기지 못할 것입니다)."

Before the main body of the Japanese navy advanced into the Yellow Sea, they sent out a few probing missions with armed scouting parties. At this time, Admiral Yi's fleet was south of the Myeongnyang Strait near Oranpo. On October 8, an advanced scouting party of eight Japanese vessels staged a surprise attack, which the Joseon fleet drove off. Yi retreated further north to Byeokpajin, on the northern end of Jindo island. On October 12, Pae Sŏl fled (he would be found later by Joseon authorities and executed for desertion). On October 17, a Japanese scouting fleet of 13 ships launched a night attack which, after heavy fighting, was also repulsed.

By this time, through the reports of their scouting forces, the Japanese were aware of the presence of Joseon naval remnants that intended to resist their advance. Well armed scouting forces alone were not going to defeat or scatter the Joseon remnants, so the Japanese began amassing a much larger fleet. Admiral Yi's diary mentions reports of around 55 Japanese ships massing near Oranpo on October 17. With Japanese naval activity increasing, Admiral Yi did not want to fight a major battle with his back to the Myeongnyang Strait, so on October 25 he decided to withdraw further north and hide his ships in the shadow of the hills on the opposite (northern) side of the Myeongnyang Strait, near Usuyeong (우수영).

== Battle ==
=== Preparation ===
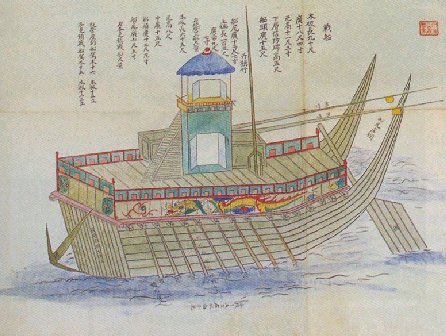
Panokseon

Admiral Yi studied numerous sites for his last stand with the Japanese navy and decided on luring them into the Myeongnyang Strait. The Japanese would clearly enter the strait when the tide was favorable and so he did not want to fight south of the strait, with the current at the attacker's advantage. Instead he wanted to fight in the waters just north of the strait, where the currents were calmer. The strait had very strong currents that flowed at approximately 10 knots, first in one direction, then in the opposite direction, in three-hour intervals. Yi realized that he could use the unique condition as a force multiplier. The narrowness of the strait would prevent the Joseon fleet from being flanked by the numerically superior enemy fleet, and the roughness of the currents prevented the Japanese from effectively maneuvering, forcing them to attack in smaller groups and making it difficult to close in with the Korean ships. Furthermore, once the tide changed, the flow of the current would in effect push the Japanese away from Yi's fleet and the momentum could be harnessed to increase the effectiveness of a counterattack.

=== Yi's account ===
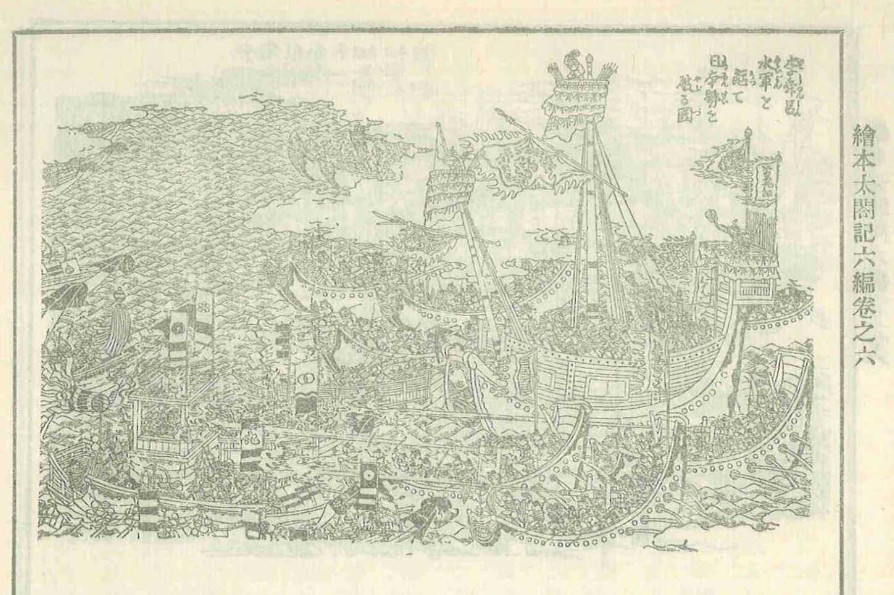
Battle of Myeongnyang.

Early in the morning of October 26, the huge Japanese fleet was spotted by Yi's scouts as they deployed around the small bay on the southern end of Myeongnyang strait. Admiral Yi's fleet then redeployed out of their base in Usuyeong to block the northern end of the strait. Yi described scouts reporting countless enemy ships in the morning prior to battle, with 133 attacking. In Japanese records, the ships at the front of their formations were the middle class warships called Sekibune, as the larger Atakebune could not fit into the shallow straits.

Yi's warships deployed on the northern end of the strait and dropped anchor. Yi in his flagship advanced upon the vanguard of the Japanese fleet, which was commanded by Kurushima Michifusa. For a time only the flagship fought in the battle. The crews of the Joseon fleet were made up of survivors from Chilcheollyang and they were still badly shaken and intimidated by the overwhelming size of the Japanese fleet. Yi said in his diary: "My flagship was alone facing the enemy formation. Only my ship fired cannons and arrows. None of the other ships advanced, so I could not assure our outcome. All other officers were seeking to run, as they knew this battle was against a massive force. Ship commanded by Kim Ŏkch'u, the Officer of Jeolla Right province, was 1~2 majang (1 majang: approximately 390 metres) away." For a time it looked like Yi's flagship was "... built a castle in the middle of the sea."

The flagship's ability to hold out against the Japanese vanguard eventually gave heart to the rest of Yi's fleet and small groups of his ships came to his aid. First came a ship commanded by local magistrate An Wi and then several ships commanded by central squadron leader Kim Ŭngham. Seeing the success of the flagship and the handful of other boats, the rest of Yi's fleet joined in the fight.

The tide soon shifted and the Japanese ships began to drift backwards and collide with each other. In the confusion, Admiral Yi ordered his ships to advance and press the attack, ramming 31 Japanese ships. The dense formation of Japanese ships crowded in the narrow strait made a perfect target for Joseon cannon fire. The strong tides prevented those in the water from swimming to shore, and many Japanese sailors who abandoned sinking or damaged ships drowned in the currents. Some Korean documents record the number of damaged Japanese warships, which also includes those not sunk but sustaining some amount of damage; however, the condition of the damaged ships is unclear. Having dealt a heavy blow to the Japanese, according to Yi's diary at this point the Japanese dared not approach his fleet, but though he wished to continue the battle the tides were too strong, the wind blew against him, and he was still greatly outnumbered, so he decided to withdraw to Dangsa island at nightfall.

=== Tōdō Clan's account ===
The memoirs of the Tōdō Clan described the desperate fighting before the Korean ships withdrew. Tōdō Takatora, who was the Japanese commander, described in detail how he barely survived the disastrous defeat.

御歸陣被成少前にこもがいへ御成御越候處すいゑんと申所に番舟の大将分十三艘居申候大川の瀬より早きしほの指引御座候所の内に少塩のやはらき候所に十三さうの舟居申候それを見付是非共取可申由舟手の衆と御相談に而則御取懸被成候大船にてそのせとをこぎくたし候儀は成ましきとていつれも関舟を御揃被成御かかり候先手の舟共は敵船にあひ手負数多出来申候中にも来島出雲守殿討死にて御座候其外舟手の被召連候家老之者共も過半手負討死仕候處に毛利民部大輔殿関舟にて番舟へ御かゝり被成候番舟船へ十文字のかまを御かけ候處に番舟より弓てつほうはけしく打候に付て舟をはなれ海へ御はいり被成あやうく候處に藤堂孫八郎藤堂勘解由両人舟をよせてきせむをおいのけたすけ申候朝の五時分より酉の刻迄御合戰にて御座へとも舟之様子番船能存候に付風を能見すまし其せと口をぬけほを引かけはしらせ申に付無是非追懸申儀も不罷成候和泉樣も手を二ヶ所おはせられ候

Just before the lord [Tōdō Takatora] returned [to Japan], he went to Komogai, when at a place called Suien [Woosooyoung] there were thirteen warships of the commander's class. The tide pulled in and out quickly at the rapids of the channel. Where the tide was a little weaker there were the thirteen ships. Having found them the lord discussed with the sailors if we could take them, but being told the large ship he was riding on could not row in the straits, so all the ships the lord gathered were sekibune and he attacked. The forward ships suffered many wounds. Among them Kurushima, Lord of Izumo was killed, and among the men of the elders brought over as sailors over half were also wounded or killed but then Lord Mōri the Senior Assistant Minister of Popular Affairs on a sekibune attacked the warships. As he grappled with the warships with cross-shaped hooks, the Korean ships shot bows and guns fiercely, and the ships parted and was about to enter the oceans when at the moment of danger Tōdō Magohachirō and Tōdō the Regional Inspector, the two of them went in their boats and chased away the enemy ships and saved him. The fighting lasted from the hour of the dragon to the hour of the rooster, but as the warships knew well the condition of the ships, on clearly seeing wind hoisted sail and set for the mouth of the straight there, and there was nothing we could do to catch them. Lord Izumi suffered two wounds on his hand.

== Aftermath ==
Even after the victory, the Joseon navy was still outnumbered by the remaining Japanese navy, so Admiral Yi withdrew to resupply his fleet and have more space for mobile defense. After hearing the news of the heroic victory, many surviving ships and sailors who had been in hiding after the defeat at Battle of Chilcheollyang joined Admiral Yi's fleet. In Yi's report to the court as recorded in the Annals of the Joseon Dynasty, he was fortunate to gain a small victory after the disaster at Chilcheollyang, with which the Japanese momentum was blunted and they were prevented from entering the Yellow Sea. The victory also enabled the Chinese navy to join Admiral Yi in early 1598. After the destruction of most of the Joseon fleet at Chilcheollyang, the Ming kept their navy stationed at important port cities to guard against possible Japanese naval attacks. The victory at Myeongnyang convinced the Ming government that they could ease security at their major ports and deploy a fleet to the Joseon navy's aid.

The Japanese navy was heavily damaged, at least 30 of the Japanese fighting ships were destroyed. Kurushima was killed, Tōdō Takatora was wounded and the Japanese suffered extremely heavy casualties, with a captured prisoner reporting half were killed or wounded. The Japanese navy continued with a minor incursion into the western coast of Korea, but soon withdrew to consolidate their holdings along the southern coast. In order to avenge themselves, the Japanese conducted a punitive expedition against Yi's residence of Asan on November 23, 1597 (14th day of the 10th month by the Chinese calendar), burning the village and murdering Yi Myon, Admiral Yi's youngest son.

One Japanese claimed that the battle was a strategic victory for the Japanese navy merely because the Joseon navy abandoned the Myeongnyang Strait as well as the surrounding waters, and retreated after the battle.

However, dozens of the books which were published by the Japanese Governor-General of Korea, Japanese historians during Empire of Japan era also summarized the battle as a Korean decisive victory, as did those published by the Imperial Japanese Navy.

Furthermore, almost every modern Japanese historian also said the battle was a Korean decisive victory.

"In the end, Yi's thirteen-strong fleet defeated ten times that number of Japanese ships. The defeat not only frustrated Japan's advance to the West Sea but also gave Chosŏn a respite to rebuild the navy. Yi's victory at Myŏngnyang can be credited to his combat tactics, the construction of a small and yet powerful fleet, and the participation of refugee civilians and refugee ships in the battle."

"By the time the Japanese reached open water and the exhausted Koreans gave up their pursuit, thirty-one ships of Hideyoshi's navy had been destroyed, while Yi's fleet remained intact. With that the Japanese navy began to fall back toward the border of Kyongsang Province, then farther still toward Angolpo and Pusan. It would give up all thought of gaining access to the Yellow Sea, and would not venture west again."

== Technical notes ==
=== Chain or iron rope across the strait ===
There are claims that Yi had iron ropes tightened across the channel between Japanese fleet groups, which severely dampened the Japanese numerical advantage. However, in Yi's war diary no mention is made of such a tactic.

== See also ==
- Force multiplication
- Forlorn hope
- History of Korea
- Joseon Dynasty
- Last stand
- Naval history of Korea
- Battle of Salamis – an ancient sea battle in which a small Greek fleet defeated a numerically far superior Persian fleet of invaders

== Bibliography ==
- Alagappa, Muthiah (2003), Asian Security Order: Instrumental and Normative Features, Stanford University Press, ISBN 0-8047-4629-X
- Arano, Yasunori (2005), The Formation of a Japanocentric World Order, International Journal of Asian Studies
- Brown, Delmer M. (May 1948), "The Impact of Firearms on Japanese Warfare, 1543–1598", The Far Eastern Quarterly, 7 (3), Association for Asian Studies: 236–53, doi:10.2307/2048846, JSTOR 2048846, S2CID 162924328
- Eikenberry, Karl W. (1988), "The Imjin War", Military Review, 68 (2): 74–82
- Ha, Tae-hung; Sohn, Pow-key (1977), 'Nanjung ilgi: War Diary of Admiral Yi Sun-sin, Yonsei University Press, ISBN 89-7141-018-3
- Haboush, JaHyun Kim (2016), The Great East Asian War and the Birth of the Korean Nation
- Hawley, Samuel (2005), The Imjin War, The Royal Asiatic Society, Korea Branch/UC Berkeley Press, ISBN 89-954424-2-5
- Jang, Pyun-soon (1998), Noon-eu-ro Bo-nen Han-gook-yauk-sa 5: Gor-yeo Si-dae (눈으로 보는 한국역사 5: 고려시대), Park Doo-ui, Bae Keum-ram, Yi Sang-mi, Kim Ho-hyun, Kim Pyung-sook, et al., Joog-ang Gyo-yook-yaun-goo-won. 1998-10-30. Seoul, Korea.
- Kim, Ki-chung (Fall 1999), "Resistance, Abduction, and Survival: The Documentary Literature of the Imjin War (1592–8)", Korean Culture, 20 (3): 20–29
- Kim, Yung-sik (1998), "Problems and Possibilities in the Study of the History of Korean Science", Osiris, 2nd Series, 13: 48–79, doi:10.1086/649280, JSTOR 301878, S2CID 143724260
- 桑田忠親 [Kuwata, Tadachika], ed., 舊參謀本部編纂, [Kyu Sanbo Honbu], 朝鮮の役 [Chousen no Eki] (日本の戰史 [Nihon no Senshi] Vol. 5), 1965.
- Lewis, James B. (2014), The East Asian War, 1592–1598; International relations, violence, and memory, Routledge Press, ISBN 978-1-315-76720-8
- Neves, Jaime Ramalhete (1994), "The Portuguese in the Im-Jim War?", Review of Culture, 18: 20–24
- Niderost, Eric (June 2001), "Turtleboat Destiny: The Imjin War and Yi Sun Shin", Military Heritage, 2 (6): 50–59, 89
- Niderost, Eric (January 2002), "The Miracle at Myongnyang, 1597", Osprey Military Journal, 4 (1): 44–50
- Park, Yune-hee (1973), Admiral Yi Sun-shin and His Turtleboat Armada: A Comprehensive Account of the Resistance of Korea to the 16th Century Japanese Invasion, Shinsaeng Press
- Rockstein, Edward D. (1993), Strategic And Operational Aspects of Japan's Invasions of Korea 1592–1598 1993-6-18, Naval War College
- Sadler, A. L. (June 1937), "The Naval Campaign in the Korean War of Hideyoshi (1592–1598)", Transactions of the Asiatic Society of Japan, Second Series, 14: 179–208
- Sansom, George (1961), A History of Japan 1334–1615, Stanford University Press, ISBN 0-8047-0525-9
- Sohn, Pow-key (April–June 1959), "Early Korean Painting", Journal of the American Oriental Society, 79 (2): 96–103, doi:10.2307/595851, JSTOR 595851
- Stramigioli, Giuliana (December 1954), "Hideyoshi's Expansionist Policy on the Asiatic Mainland", Transactions of the Asiatic Society of Japan, Third Series, 3: 74–116
- Strauss, Barry (Summer 2005), "Korea's Legendary Admiral", MHQ: The Quarterly Journal of Military History, 17 (4): 52–61
- Swope, Kenneth M. (2006), "Beyond Turtleboats: Siege Accounts from Hideyoshi's Second Invasion of Korea, 1597–1598", Sungkyun Journal of East Asian Studies, 6 (2), Academy of East Asian Studies: 177–206
- Swope, Kenneth M. (2005), "Crouching Tigers, Secret Weapons: Military Technology Employed During the Sino-Japanese-Korean War, 1592–1598", The Journal of Military History, 69: 11–42, doi:10.1353/jmh.2005.0059, S2CID 159829515
- Swope, Kenneth M. (December 2002), "Deceit, Disguise, and Dependence: China, Japan, and the Future of the Tributary System, 1592–1596", The International History Review, 24 (4): 757–1008, doi:10.1080/07075332.2002.9640980, S2CID 154827808
- Swope, Kenneth M. (2009), A Dragon's Head and a Serpent's Tail: Ming China and the First Great East Asian War, 1592–1598, University of Oklahoma Press
- Turnbull, Stephen (2002), Samurai Invasion: Japan's Korean War 1592–98, Cassell & Co, ISBN 0-304-35948-3
- Turnbull, Stephen (2008), The Samurai Invasion of Korea 1592-98, Osprey Publishing Ltd
- Turnbull, Stephen (1998), The Samurai Sourcebook, Cassell & Co, ISBN 1-85409-523-4
- Villiers, John (1980), SILK and Silver: Macau, Manila and Trade in the China Seas in the Sixteenth Century (A lecture delivered to the Hong Kong Branch of the Royal Asiatic Society at the Hong Kong Club. 10 June 1980)
- Yi, Min-woong (2004), Imjin Wae-ran Haejeonsa: The Naval Battles of the Imjin War [임진왜란 해전사], Chongoram Media [청어람미디어], ISBN 89-89722-49-7
