= Hongik University =

Private university in Seoul, South Korea

- 홍익대학교
- Motto: Pro Hominum Beneficio; Hongik Ingan (홍익인간)
- Motto in English: "To broadly Benefit Humanity"
- Type: Private
- Established: April 25, 1946; 80 years ago
- Chairman: Lee Myeon-yeong
- President: Park Sang-joo (박상주)
- Faculty: 567 full-time 483 part-time (2019)
- Administrative staff: 433 (2019)
- Students: 21,305 (2019)
- Undergraduates: 17,688 (2019)
- Postgraduates: 3,617 (2019)
- Location: Mapo, Seoul, South Korea; 37°33′02″N 126°55′33″E
- Campus: Urban (Seoul) Suburban (Sejong, branch campus)
- Colors: Blue
- Sporting affiliations: U-League
- Mascot: Cow
- Website: hongik.ac.kr hongik.ac.kr/en

Korean name
- Hangul: 홍익대학교
- Hanja: 弘益大學校
- RR: Hongik daehakgyo
- MR: Hongik taehakkyo

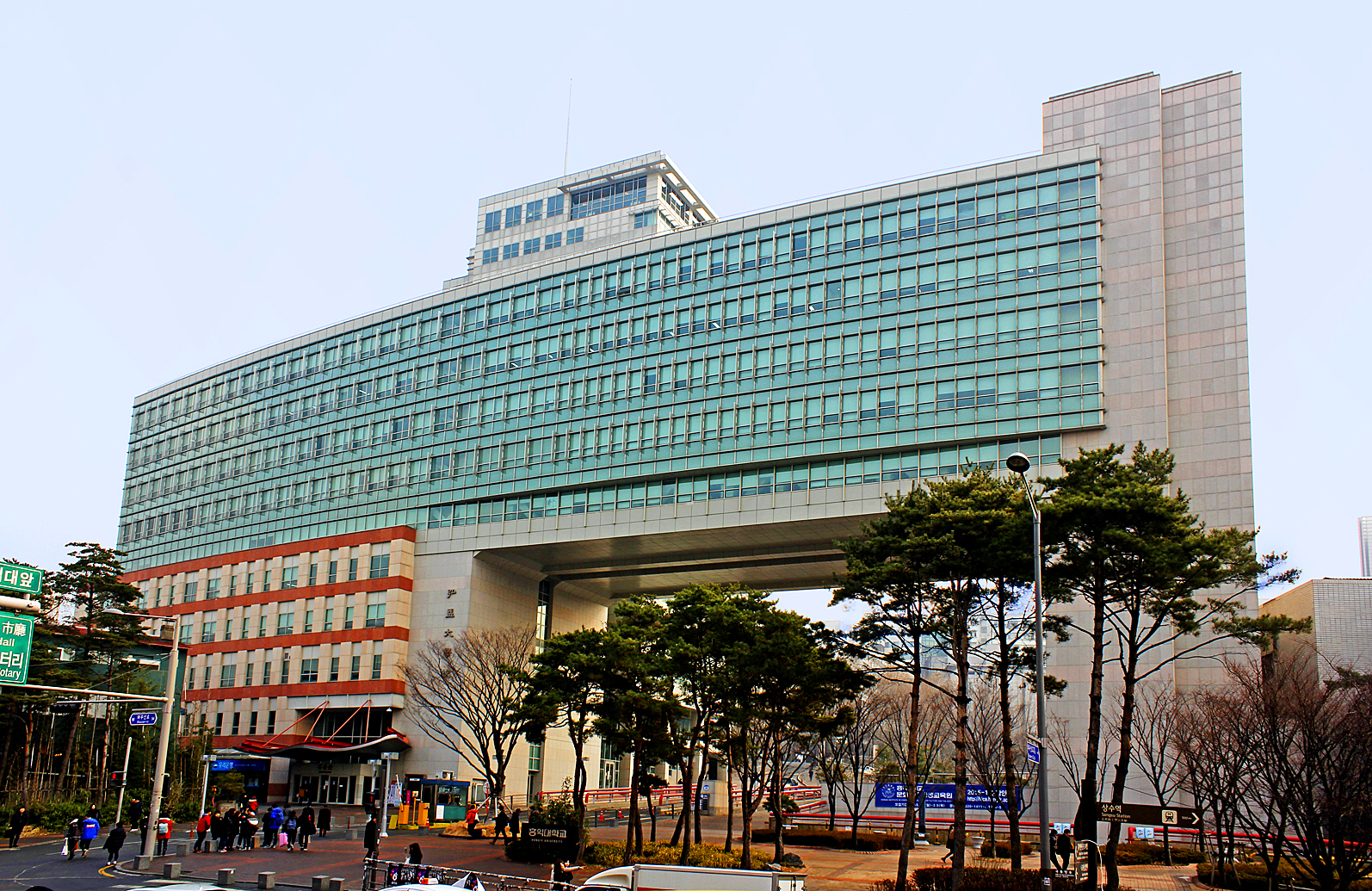
Hongik University gate

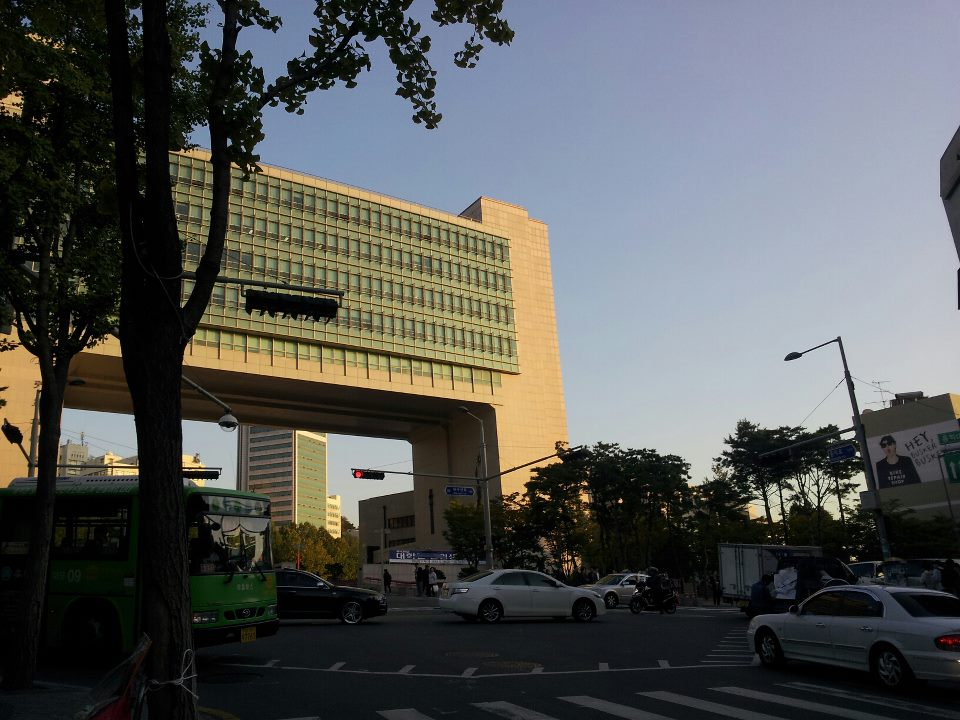
Gate from Hongdae Boulevard

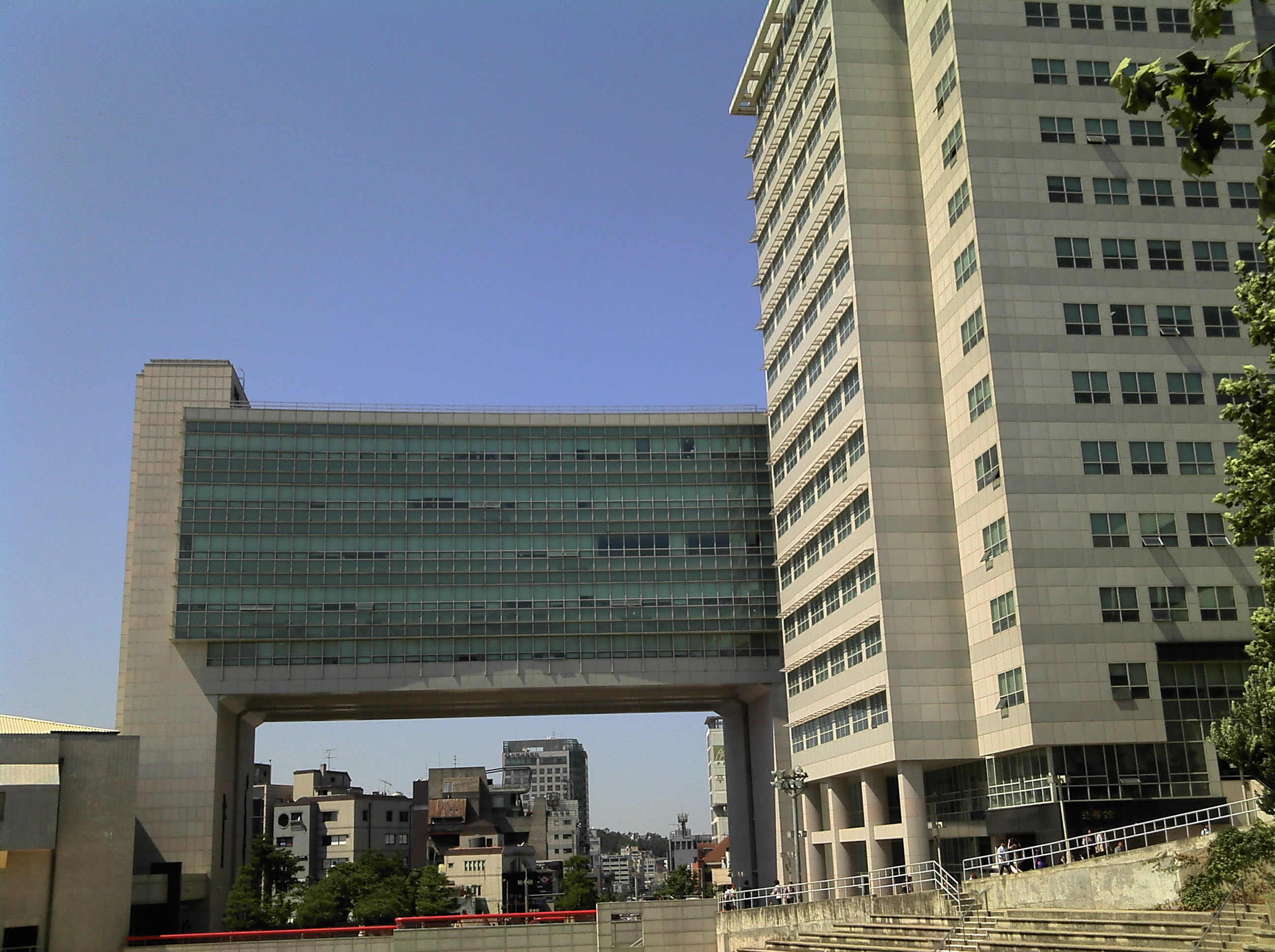
Gate from inside the campus

Hongik University (Korean: 홍익대학교; colloquially as Hongdae) is a private university in Mapo, Seoul, South Korea. It was founded in 1946. The university also maintains a branch campus in Sejong City. The university's colloquial name, "Hongdae", is a metonymy for the neighborhood, Hongdae area.

== History ==
The university was established shortly after Korean independence. The Daejongkyo founders, upon returning to Korea following Japanese surrender after years of exile in China, prioritized the establishment of an educational institution. As a result, in 1946, they founded the school, then named Hongmoon-daehakgwan (홍문대학관). Lee Hung Soo, a wealthy Korean independent activist, donated the initial funds from which the university found its beginnings. In August 1948, Hongik University and Hongik Foundation was approved officially by the Korean government.

== Campuses ==
Ground

Hong-mun hall, 5th floor balcony

Hong-mun hall, 5th floor

The main campus of the school is in west central Seoul, and the second in Sejong.

=== Seoul campus ===
Since 1955, Hongik University's main campus is located in Mapo District, Seoul.

Building		Alphabet Code	Usage
English	Korean	Alphabet Code	Usage
Humanities and Social Science Hall A	인문사회관 A동	A	College of Business Administration
Humanities and Social Science Hall B	인문사회관 B동	B	College of Business Administration
Humanities and Social Science Hall C	인문사회관 C동	C	College of Liberal Arts, College of Education, School of Economics
Humanities and Social Science Hall D	인문사회관 D동	D	
Design and Arts Hall	조형관	E	College of Fine Arts
Fine Arts Hall	미술학관	F	College of Fine Arts
Student Union Hall	학생회관	G	
Central Library	중앙도서관	H	
Science Hall	과학관	I	College of Engineering
Third Engineering Hall	제3공학관	J	College of Architecture and Urban Planning
First Engineering Hall	제1공학관	K	College of Engineering
Wau Center	와우관	L	College of Architecture and Urban Planning
Gymnasium	체육관	M	
Mun-heon Hall	문헌관	MH	Administration Complex
Social Education Hall	사회교육관	N	
Second Engineering Hall	제2공학관	P	College of Engineering
Information and Communication Center	정보통신센터	Q	
Hong-mun Hall	홍문관	R	College of Law
Auditorium	강당	S	
Fourth Engineering Hall	제4공학관	T	College of Engineering
Integrated Lecture Building	미술종합강의동	U	College of Fine Arts
Int'l Language Education Hall	국제교육관	V	
Nam-mun Hall (South Gate Building)	남문관	W	
First Lecture Building	제1강의동	Z1	
Lee Cheon-deuk Hall (Second Lecture Building)	이천득관	Z2	
Third Lecture Building	제3강의동	Z3	
Fourth Lecture Building	제4강의동	Z4	College of Fine Arts
Sang-su Dormitory (First Hall of Residents)	상수학사 (제1기숙사)	-	
Wau Dormitory (Second Hall of Residents)	와우학사 (제2기숙사)	-	
Seong-mi Dormitory (Third Hall of Residents)	성미학사 (제3기숙사)	-	
Foreign Faculty Apartment	외국인숙소	-	
Ye-mun Hall	예문관	-	
Hongik Art Square	홍익아트스퀘어	-	

- Hongik University station
- Sangsu station

Some facilities, including International Design school for Advanced Studies, are located in Daehangno, Jongno District, Seoul.

=== Sejong campus ===
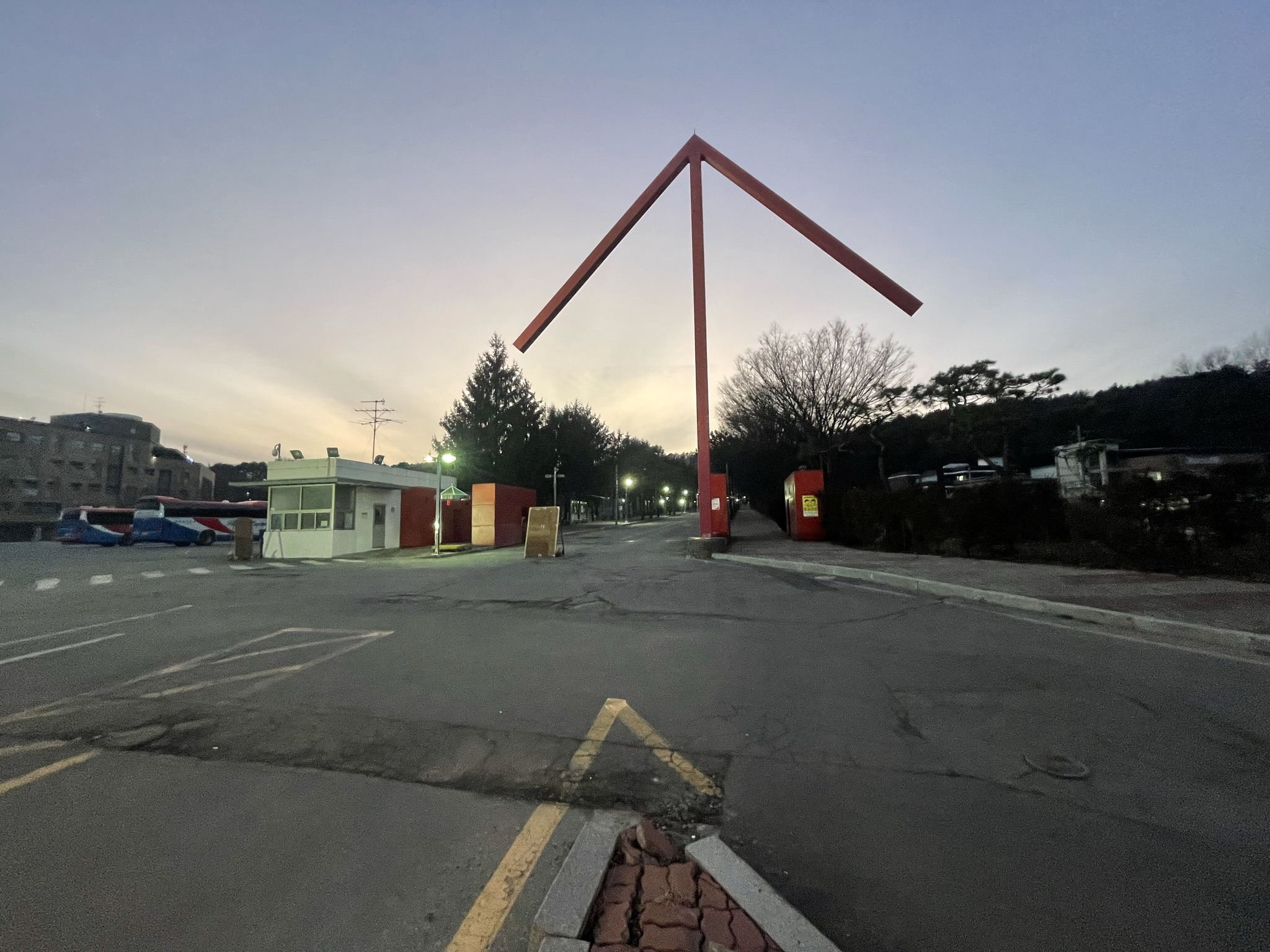
In front of Sejong campus

Opened in 1987, the second campus is located in Sejong City.

== Colleges and Schools ==
=== Undergraduate ===
- College of Fine Arts
  - Department of Oriental Painting
  - Department of Painting
  - Department of Printmaking
  - Department of Sculpture
  - Department of Woodworking and Furniture Design
  - Department of Art Theory and History
  - Department of Metal Art and Design
  - Department of Ceramics and Glass
  - Department of Textile Art and Fashion Design
  - School of Design
    - Major in Visual Communication Design
    - Major in Industrial Design
- College of Liberal Arts
  - Department of Korean Language and Literature
  - Department of German Language and Literature
  - Department of French Language and Literature
  - Department of English Language and Literature
- College of Engineering
  - Department of Civil and Environmental Engineering
  - Department of Mechanical & System Design Engineering
  - School of Electronic & Electrical Engineering
  - School of Chemical Engineering & Materials Science
    - Major in Materials Science & Engineering
    - Major in Chemical Engineering
  - Department of Industrial and Data Engineering
  - Department of Computer Engineering
- College of Architecture and Urban Planning
  - School of Architecture
    - Major in Architecture
    - Major in Interior Architecture
  - Department of Urban Design and Planning
- College of Business Administration
  - School of Business Administration
- College of Law
  - School of Law
- College of Education
  - Department of Education
  - Department of Korean Language Education
  - Department of Mathematics Education
  - Department of History Education
  - Department of English Language Education
- College of Science and Technology
  - School of Architecture Engineering
    - Major in Architecture Design
    - Major in Architecture Engineering
  - Department of Mechanical & Design Engineering
  - Department of Biological & Chemical Engineering
  - Department of Electronic & Electrical Convergence Engineering
  - Department of Nanomaterial Engineering
  - Department of Naval Architecture & Ocean Engineering
  - Department of Software & Communication Engineering
- College of Business Management
  - School of Business Management
    - Major in International Management
    - Major in Accounting
    - Major in Finance & Insurance
- College of Design Arts
  - School of Design Convergence
  - School of Film & Animation
- School of Performing Arts
  - Major in Musical Theatre
  - Major in Contemporary Music
- School of Economics
- School of Design Management
- School of Liberal Studies
- School of Advertising and Public Relations
- School of Games
  - Major in Game Software
  - Major in Game Graphic Design
- Department of Sports Science

=== Postgraduate ===
- International Design school for Advanced Studies
- Graduate School of Architecture and Urban Design
- Graduate School of Business
- Graduate School of Education
- Graduate School of Fine Arts
- Graduate School of Performing Arts
- Graduate School of Culture, Information and Public Policy
- Graduate School of Industrial Arts
- Graduate School of Film, Digital Media and Communication
- Graduate School of Arts and Cultural Management
- Graduate School of Fashion
- Graduate School of Smart Urban Science Management

== Notable alumni ==
- Kim Jong-deok, (Visual Design): Former Dean of Hongik University's Graduate School of Visual Arts. 48th Minister of Culture, Sports and Tourism.
- Taegon Kim, (Electronic and Electrical Engineering): Managing Director, Endors. Im Jinrok, Colossus, Monarch Online development.
- Choi Won-young, actor
- Jo Han-sun, actor
- Kang Eui-sik, actor
- Kim Sung-kyung, actress
- Ko Eun-ah, actress
- Ko Young-hoon, painter
- Kwon Oh-joong, actor
- GRAY, rapper and producer from AOMG
- Maia Ruth Lee, artist
- Loco, rapper from AOMG
- Oh Hyuk, musician from Hyukoh
- Woo Won-jae, rapper from AOMG
- Lee Bul, artist
- Lee Hun Chung, artist
- Kimsooja, artist
- Park Seo-bo, artist
- Han Yujoo, writer
- Kim Yong-ik, artist
- Kim Hong-hee, art historian, curator
- Chan-Jin Chung, professor & founder of Robofest
- Lee Uk-bae, writer and illustrator of children's books
- Ha Chong-hyun, artist
- Park Hyun-ki, artist
- Bae Se-hwa, artist
- SangYup Lee, automotive designer
- Saeju Jeong, entrepreneur
- Chung Hyun, sculptor

== See also ==
- List of colleges and universities in South Korea
- Education in South Korea
- Hongdae, Seoul
