= Jeong Hyeon =

Jeong Hyeon may refer to:

- Jung Hyun (born 1994), South Korean baseball player
- Chung Hyeon (born 1996), South Korean tennis player
- Chung Hyun (sculptor) (born 1956), South Korean sculptor
- Jung-hyun, Korean given name
