= Lee Uk-bae =

South Korean Writer and Illustrator of Children's books

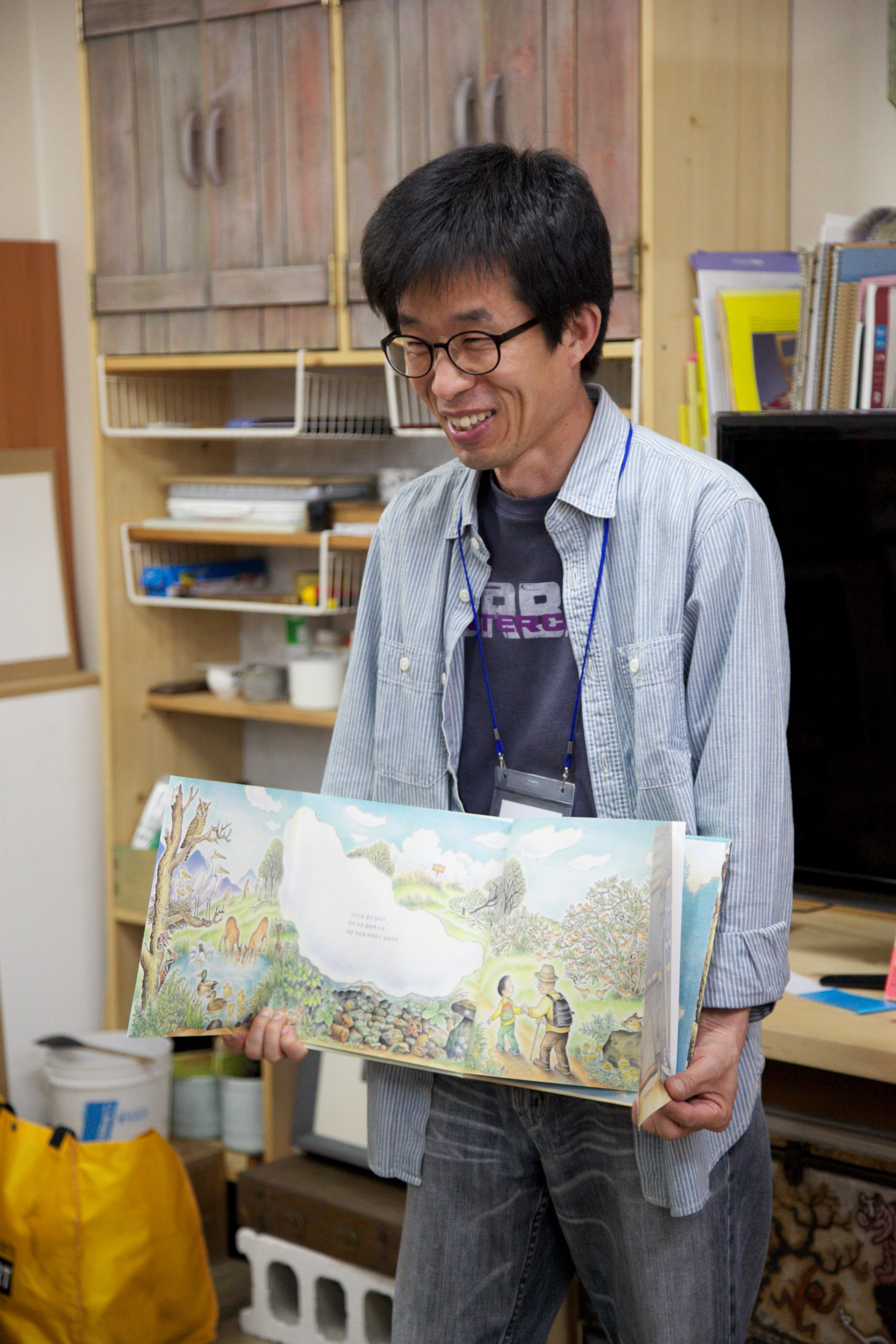
- Lee at the Library in 2016
- Born: 1960 (age 65–66); Yongin, South Korea
- Occupations: Author, illustrator
- Writing career
- Language: Korean
- Genre: Picture Books

Lee Uk-bae (Korean: 이억배; born 1960) is a South-Korean writer and illustrator of children's books. Lee, known as an artist who produces picture books that effectively convey Korea's unique cultural sentiment. The elements of Minhwa(Korean folk paintings) are distinctive in his paintings. He had his first success with Sori's Harvest Moon Day in 1995, which was published in US, Japan, China, Taiwan, France and Switzerland. As an illustrator, he was the Korean nominee for the 2020 Hans Christian Andersen Award, the highest international distinction given to authors and illustrators of children's books.

== Life ==
Lee was born in Yongin in 1960 and majored in sculpture at Hongik University. The democratic protests in Korea in the early 1980s influenced his worldview and painting style, leading him to reinterpret traditional Korean art in modern terms and make a contribution to ordinary people and labourers. He began to work as a writer and illustrator in the early 1990s in the series of the children's books titled The World Is My Friend. For the following two years, he devoted himself to the illustrations for Sori's Harvest moon day, which was published in 1995 and marked a total change into a picture book illustrator. He lives in rural Korea with his wife, who is also a children's book author, and their children.

== Career ==
As part of his effort to reproduce the unique Korean colours, Lee adopted traditional Korean colouring techniques in all of his pictures. He uses traditional brushes, paper and paints with a full range of colours that are clear and transparent. He has had the desire of inheriting the traditions of Chosun’s Genre paintings and reviving them in the form of modern genre paintings. His wish to create modern genre paintings is well reflected in his illustrations in Sori's Harvest moon day. It was made the list of recommended books by Japanese Ministry of Education, Culture, Sports, Science and Technology. In the Strongest Rooster in the World (1997) by Lee Ho-baek, the mountains and the sky are expressed in dim ark colours reflecting the inner world of the rooster. The book was selected for BIB in 1997 and shortlisted for Good Books for Special Exhibitions at the Bologna Book Fair in 1999. His illustrations for Generous Grandma's Dumpling Making (1998) by Chae In-Sun and The Mosquito and the Yellow Bull (2003) by Hyun Dong-yeom have also been included in the list of Korean recommended books. He wrote and illustrated A Tale of Tales (2008), which was included in the 2010 IBBY Honour List. His political views on the role of art to encourage peace continue to influence his work, for example in When Spring Comes to the DMZ (2010). This work was selected as an excellent work in the 2019 Freeman Book Award at the National Consortium for Teaching about Asia (NCTA) – a multi-year initiative to encourage and facilitate teaching and learning about East Asia in elementary and secondary schools nationwide – and a book recommended by the judges in the 2020 Hans Christian Andersen Award (HCAA).

== Awards ==
- 2020 Nominated by IBBY on the Hans Christian Andersen Awards
- 2020 Honor list of Mildred L. Batchelder Award - When Spring comes to the DMZ
- 2019 Awarded Freeman Book Award Honorable Mention - When Spring comes to the DMZ
- 2019 Selected on the lists of the Calldenotts - When Spring comes to the DMZ
- 2010 IBBY Honor List – A Tale of Story Bag
- 2005 100 Korean Books lists at Frankfrut Book Fair - The Mosquito and the Yellow Bull
- 1999 Special Exhibitions at Bologna Children's Book Fair - The Strongest Rooster in The World
- 1998 Awarded Korea Best Culture Work for Children - Generous Grandma's Dumpling Making
- 1997 Selected for Biennial of Illustrations Bratislava (BIB) - The Strongest Rooster in The World

== Works as Writer and Illustrator ==
- 2020 Brother Sun, Sister Moon (Sakyejul)ISBN 9791160945348
- 2019 The Trip of Bom (Iyagikot)ISBN 9788998751425
- 2010 When Spring Comes to the DMZ. Sakyejul. 2019. ISBN 9780874869729.
- 2008 A Tale of Tales (Borim)ISBN 9788943307530
- 2006 Jal-jal-jal 123 (Sakyejul)ISBN 9788958281887
- 2005 Naughty Child's ㄱㄴㄷ (Sakyejul) ISBN 9788958280828
- 1995 Sori's Harvest moon day (Gilbut Children) ISBN 9781568996875

== Collaborations with other authors ==
- 2014 The Story of the Sewol by 65 writers (ByeolSup)
- 2014 A Family of Five Generation by Go Eun (Bawusol)
- 2011 Charyeong's Kiss(Poems for Children) by Go Eun (Bawusol) ISBN 9788983894830
- 2003 The Mosquito and the Yellow Bull by Hyun Dong-yeom (Gilbut Children) ISBN 9788955820041
- 2002 Princess Sunwha and Yam Seller by Han Ji-yeon (Kyowon)
- 2000 Five-inch-long Tail, Five-inch-long Lips by Jung Hae-wang (Kyowon) ISBN 9788921001399
- 2000 Heroes Who Opened the New Sky by Jung Ha-seop (Changbi) ISBN 8936449842
- 2000 The Story of a Seagull and the Cat Who Taught her to Fly by Luis Sepúlveda (Bada) ISBN 9788955611915
- 1999 An Ox with Three Legs by Ahn Hoi-nam (Bori)
- 1998 Generous Grandma's Dumpling Making by Chae In-sun (Jaemimaju) ISBN 9788986565065
- 1998 Who Are You by Eom Hye-sook (Daseossure) ISBN 9788974781118
- 1997 Eating Rice Cake Rolling Over and Over by Seo Jeong-oh (Bori)
- 1997 Half a Loaf by Lee Mi-ae (Borim) ISBN 9788943302634
- 1997 The Strongest Rooster in The World by Lee Ho-baek (Jaemimaju) ISBN 9784880129761
- 1996 Brother Sun, Sister Moon by Bae Myung-hee (Dooson Media)
- 1996 A Boy on Tiger's Back (Woori Education) ISBN 9788980405091
- 1996 A Greedy Man Pinned under Gold (Woori Education)
- 1993 Develop1998 Who Are You by Eom Hye-sook (Daseossure) ISBN 9788974781118ment of Tools (Dooson Media)
