= International Design School for Advanced Studies =

School associated with Hongik University

Coordinates: 37.54802°N 126.92486°E

- 홍익대학교 국제디자인전문대학원
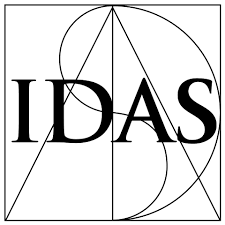
- Authority Mark of IDAS, Hongik University
- Motto in English: Once IDAS, Forever IDAS!
- Type: Private
- Established: 1996
- Chairman: Lee Myeon-yeong
- Location: Jongno, Seoul, South Korea
- Campus: Urban
- Website: idas.hongik.ac.kr

Korean name
- Hangul: 홍익대학교 국제디자인전문대학원
- Hanja: 弘益大學校 國際디자인專門大學院
- RR: Hongik daehakgyo gukje dijain jeonmun daehagwon
- MR: Hongik taehakkyo kukche tijain chŏnmun taehagwŏn

The International Design School for Advanced Studies (IDAS, Korean: 홍익대학교 국제디자인전문대학원) is a graduate school affiliated with Hongik University in Seoul. It engages in local design education and research.

== History ==
- 1996 South Korea's Ministry of Industry and Energy founded the International Design School for Advanced Studies. Since then, a private academy.
- 2004 merger with Hongik University.

== Majors ==
- Digital Media Design (M.Des)
- Product Style Design (M.Des)
- Style Management (M.Des)
- Style Studies (Ph.D)

== Degrees ==
- Masters of Style Design
- Masters of Style (Digital Media Design)
- Masters of Style (Craft Style Design)
- Masters of Style (Craft Management)
- Doctor of Philosophy (Craft Studies)
