= Kim Hong-hee =

Kim Hong-hee (Korean: 김홍희) is an art historian, curator and critic based in Korea. Her main field of interest is in Video and Feminist Art. She was the director of the Seoul Museum of Art (SeMA) from 2012-2016.

== Biography ==
From 2000 until 2011 she was an adjunct professor at Hongik University, Seoul, Korea. She has published several books:

- The True Colors of Curator, Hangil Art, 2012.
- Good Morning Mr. Paik, Design House, 2007. ISBN 978-89-7041-946-6
- Women and Art, Contemporary Art Discourse and the Field I, Noonbit, 2003.
- Korean Art World and Contemporary Art, Contemporary Art Discourse and the Field II, Noonbit, 2003.
- Feminism. Video. Art., Jaewon, 1998.

Kim received her Ph.D. in Art History from Hong-Ik University, Seoul, Korea and did her MA in Art History at Concordia University in Montreal, Canada.

== Major curations ==
Recently, she acted as a member of the selection committee for the next documenta 14 in Kassel, Germany. Since 2012, she is currently the director of Seoul Museum of Art (SeMA) after holding the directorship of Gyeonggi Museum of Modern Art in Gyeonggi Province of Korea from 2006 to 2010. She founded the very first alternative space in Korea called "SSamzie Space" in 1998 and directed until 2006. Her career includes: FANTasia (2015); Artistic Director of the Gwangju Biennale (2006); Commissioner of the Korean Pavilion of the 50th Venice Biennale (2003); International Committee Member of the Yokohama Triennale (2001); Commissioner of the Gwangju Biennale (2000); Curator of the Special Exhibition "Info ART" at the Gwangju Biennale (1995); Curator of "Seoul-NYmAX Medial" (1995/1994); Organizer of "The SeOUL of Fluxus" (1993). Related to feminist art, she was the organizer/curator of numerous exhibitions including "Woman, the Difference and the Power" (1994), "Patjis on Parade" (1999), "East Asian Woman and her Stories" (2002).
