= Bae Bien-u =

South Korean photographer

- Born: May 22, 1950 (age 76); Yeosu, Jeollanam-do
- Education: Hongik University
- Occupation: Photographer
- Employer: Seoul Institute of the Arts

Korean name
- Hangul: 배병우
- Hanja: 裵炳雨
- RR: Bae Byeongu
- MR: Pae Pyŏngu

Bae Bien-u (born May 22, 1950) is a South Korean photographer. He is a professor in Seoul Institute of the Arts.

== Early life and career ==
Bae was born in Suncheon and grew up in Yeosu, Jeollanam-do in 1950, and graduated from Hongik University's College of Arts in 1974 and the graduate school of the same university in 1976.

He was a professional photographer whose focused primarily on pine trees.

He became better-known outside of South Korea after selling one of his pine tree photographs to English singer Elton John in 2005. Former South Korean president Lee Myung-bak later gave a collection of Bae's pine tree photographs to U.S. president Barack Obama during a summit held in Washington.

He served as professor of the Department of Photography at Seoul Institute of the Arts.

== Selected solo exhibitions ==
Some of his solo exhibitions are listed below:

- 2008: Sacred Wood, BOZAR - Palais des Beaux-Arts de Bruxelles, Brussels
- 2009: Sacred Wood, Aando Fine Art, Berlin
- 2009: Sacred Wood, Galerie zur Stockeregg, Zurich
- 2009: Soul Garden, National Museum of Modern and Contemporary Art Korea - Deoksugung, Seoul
- 2011: ConvexConcave, Axel Vervoordt Gallery, Antwerpen
- 2012: Windscape, Aando Fine Art, Berlin
- 2012: Windscape, Christophe Guye Galerie, Zurich
- 2014: Counterbalance, Axel Vervoordt Gallery, Antwerp
- 2015: Dans un forêt l’autre, Château de Chambord, Domain national de Chambord
- 2016: Bae Bien-U -分合 Part:Meet, Axel Vervoordt Gallery, Hong Kong
- 2016: Bae Bien-U - L'Esprit du Lieu, Musée de la Mer, Cannes

== Collections of photographs ==
- To live in a thickly forested mountain (청산에 살어리랏다), 2005, ISBN 9788930101769
- Changdeokgung (창덕궁), 2009, ISBN 9788992074353
