= Maia Ruth Lee =

American artist (born 1983)

- Born: Maia Ruth Lee; Busan, South Korea
- Occupation: Artist
- Spouse: Peter Sutherland

Maia Ruth Lee (born 1983) is an American artist. Working across painting, sculpture, photography and film, Lee has crafted a visual lexicon that takes on the complexities of the self in times of dissonance and globalization.

== Work ==
Maia Ruth Lee is represented by Tina Kim Gallery in New York and François Ghebaly Gallery in Los Angeles.

== Early life ==
Lee was born in Busan, South Korea, and grew up between Kathmandu and Seoul. Lee’s parents are bible translators, and spent three decades working closely with the Sherpa community in the Solukhumbu region in Nepal. Lee has a Bachelor of Fine Arts degree from Hongik University in Seoul, South Korea. Lee also studied at Emily Carr University of Art and Design in Vancouver, Canada. She spent over a decade in New York City, and has lived in recent years in Salida, Colorado.

== Career ==
From 2016 to 2020, Lee was the director at an arts-focused non-profit group in New York City.

In 2018, Lee had a solo exhibition at Jack Hanley Gallery in New York, titled “Access to Tools”, which included wrought iron wall sculptures, Bondage Baggage sculptures, and a video projection titled “The Stranger”, the first segment of a three part video series.

In 2019, Lee participated in the Whitney Biennial at the Whitney Museum of American Art, curated by Jane Panetta and Rujeko Hockley. She presented a work titled “Labyrinth”, a series of wrought iron glyphs and Bondage Baggage sculptures.

In 2021, Lee had a solo exhibition at the Museum of Contemporary Art Denver in Colorado, titled “Language of Grief”, an exploration of language both written and oral, to capture the artist's personal experiences and also to approximate the experiences of others. Inspired and influenced by asemic writing - text that is visually seen, but which has no context - is in part a recognition of the impossibility of this effort. She presented a series of paintings, wall-based installations, works on paper, and a video by her husband Peter Sutherland.

Additionally, in 2021, Lee was the recipient of the Gold Art Prize.

In 2022, Lee participated in an exhibition at the Aspen Art Museum titled “Mountain/Time”, curated by Chrissie Iles, Anisa Jackson and Simone Krug. Lee presented a video installation titled “The Stranger”.

In 2022, Lee had a solo exhibition at François Ghebaly Gallery in Los Angeles, titled “Migrant Reader”, which included a large-scale banner installation, photographs, and wall works.

In 2023, Lee had a solo exhibition at Tina Kim Gallery in New York City, titled “The skin of the earth is seamless”. The exhibition, which was inspired by Gloria Anzaldúa’s Borderlands La Frontera, included Bondage Baggage sculptures, paintings, and a video titled “The Letter”, the second segment of Lee’s three-part video series.

In 2024, Lee participated in the Great Hall Exhibition Series Spring 2024 at the New York University Institute of Fine Arts titled “Once we leave a place is it there”, curated by Fiona Yu, Malaika Newsome, Ruiqi Wang and Clarice Lee Lee presented a large-scale installation of five Bondage Baggage banners and an interactive public offering.

In 2024, Lee had a solo exhibition at François Ghebaly Gallery in Los Angeles, titled “hold shimmer wind”, which included Bondage Baggage sculptures, wrought iron sculptures, paintings, a rope installation, and a video titled “The Line”, the final segment to Lee’s three-part video series.

In 2024-2025, Lee participated in the 6th edition of arts triennial Prospect New Orleans, “The Future is Present The Harbinger is Home”, at the Ford Motor Plant in New Orleans curated by Miranda Lash and Ebony Patterson. Supported by Art Production Fund, her work titled, "The Conveyor", explores themes of migration and rootlessness. The installation features sculptures and plastic tote trays circulating on an airport conveyor belt, filled with imagined personal belongings of a migrant far from home, alongside a rope installation with overhanging paintings reminiscent of prayer flags.

== Personal life ==
Lee's husband is Peter Sutherland, an artist. Lee resides in Salida, Colorado as of 2020, and they have one child together.

== Solo Exhibitions ==
2024 hold shimmer wind, François Ghebaly Gallery, LA

2024 Once we leave a place is it there, Great Hall Exhibition curated by Clarice Lee, Malaika Newsome, Fiona Yu, Ruiqi Wang, Institute of Fine Arts, NYU

2023 The skin of the earth is seamless, Tina Kim Gallery, NYC

2022 Migrant Reader, François Ghebaly Gallery, LA

2021 The Language of Grief, Colorado in the Present Tense MCA Denver curated by Nora Abrams, Denver, CO

2018 Access to Tools, Jack Hanley Gallery NYC

2016 01/10/16, Eli Ping Frances Perkins Gallery, NY

== Group Exhibitions ==
2024 threads, curated by Henri Gisler, Mai 36 Galerie, Zurich

2023 Revolt of the Body, curated by Simon Wu, Tina Kim Gallery

2023 Motherboy curated by Stella Bottai and Gray Wielebinski, Gio Marconi Gallery, Milan

2023 Colorado Women to Watch, a groupshow with Suchitra Mattai, Senga Nengudi, Kim Dickey, Ana Maria Hernando, Center for Visual Art, Denver

2023 Wishing Well Parker Gallery, LA

2023 Listen until you hear Organized by Fotografiska + For Freedoms, NYC

2022 Learn but the letters forme(d) by heart,Then soon you'l gain this noble art, Adams and Ollman Gallery, Portland

2022 And Still No Rain, Daniel Faria Gallery, Toronto

2022 Mountain/Time curated by Chrissie Illes, Anisa Jackson and Simone Krug, Aspen Art Museum, CO

2019 Whitney Biennial, Whitney Museum of American Art

2019 Horology, curated by Elizabeth Jaeger and Silke Lindner-Sutti, Jack Hanley Gallery

2019 Harlem Postcards curated by Yelena Keller, Studio Museum 127, Harlem

2017 Microcosm, Roberts & Tilton Gallery, Los Angeles

2016 A Being in the world, curated by Jayson Musson, Salon 94 Gallery, NY

2016 Anthem of the Sun curated by Pali Kashi, Canada Gallery, NY

== Workshops / Projects / Editions / Publications ==
Gaza Mutual Aid Print, published by Kingsland Printing, BK 2024

Subliminal Message in Green, a print edition with Nine Orchard Hotel, Produced by Harlan + Weaver, NY 2024

Bondage Baggage Residuum, a silkscreen print published by Kingsland Printing, BK 2023

Bondage Baggage Lift, an aquatint print edition printed and produced by Harlan + Weaver 2022

Language As Storage, Picture Room, NY 2022

Helmut Lang SS22 intervention by Maia Ruth Lee, Sept 2021

Writing Through Grief, Lighthouse Writers Workshop with poet Carolina Ebeid, MCA Denver 2021

Auspicious Glyphs 2021 is a fundraising edition for Printed Matter 2021

Sign and Symbols for Healing, A workshop for Teachers, New Museum 2020

Whitney Screens The Stranger (2018), Whitney Museum 2020

Anthology of Time, published by Peradem Press, 2019

Soft Surfaces, Harlem Postcards, Studio Museum 127, 2019

Paintings of Illustrations of Women at Work, Peradem, 2017

Jewelry design for TUZA (Dharma Charms / Symbols & Signs), 2016 - 2018

ZINE TORNADO, NYABF, MoMa PS1, NY 2016

Something Extracted, Exhibition A Editions, 2016

GRAMMAR, Artist Feature, The Picture Room, NY, 2016

The Absence, 8-Ball Publications, 2016

Bondage Baggage, Pauwau publications, 2016

Auspicious Glyphs; NY Art Book Fair, MoMA PS1, 2015

The SEA issue, COLORS Magazine 2011

Imperial Valley; published with Peter Sutherland; February 2011

North Fake; published with Peter Sutherland; November 2010

Signs and Voices; director and organizer; publication and photography workshop; co-led with Peter Sutherland; Kathmandu, Nepal; May 2010

Chillzine; co-founder and editor; Seoul, Korea; 2006 – 2010
