= Chan-Jin Chung =

South Korean computer scientist (born 1959)

Chan-Jin (CJ) Chung
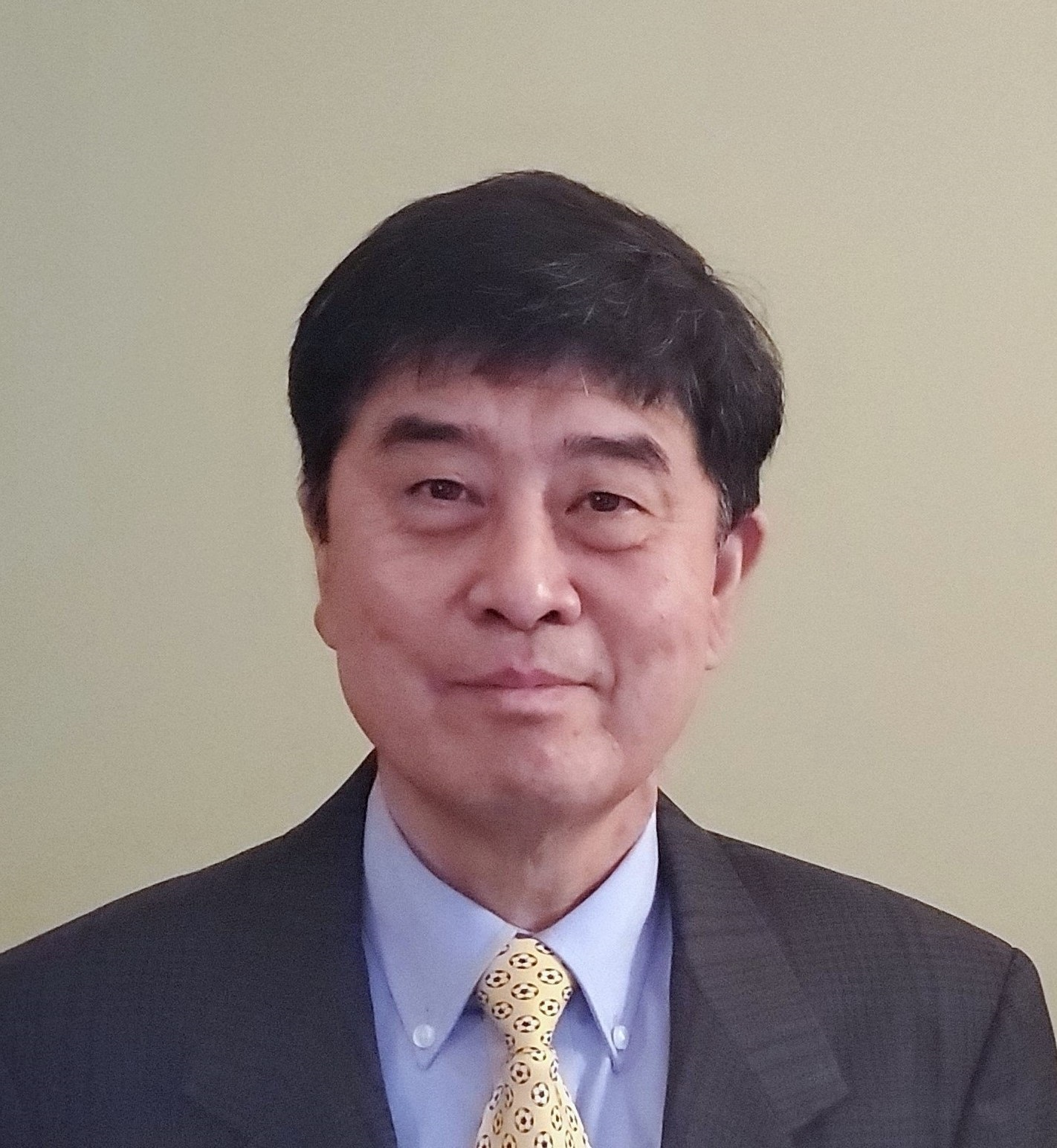
- Born: January 4, 1959 (age 67); Seoul, South Korea
- Awards: Citation of Honor Award, IEEE-USA, 2011
- Scientific career
- Fields: Computer science
- Workplaces: Professor at Lawrence Technological University
- Thesis: Knowledge-Based Self-Adaptation in Evolutionary Search (1997)
- Doctoral advisor: Robert G. Reynolds

Chan-Jin Chung (Korean: 정찬진; born January 4, 1959), also known as CJ Chung, is a professor of computer science at Lawrence Technological University (LTU) in Michigan, USA. He is the founder of Robofest, an international autonomous robotics competition established during the 1999–2000 academic year He has contributed to educational programs that integrate science, technology, engineering, mathematics (Science, technology, engineering, and mathematics), arts, robotics, and computer science.

Chung served as the founding USA National Organizer of the World Robot Olympiad (WRO) in 2014 and 2015. He also initiated the WISER (World conference on Integrated STEaM Education through Robotics) conference in 2014. His work includes the development of undergraduate curricula for connected and autonomous vehicles (CAV) supported by the National Science Foundation . His research areas include evolutionary computation, cultural algorithms, intelligent systems & autonomous mobile robotics, self-driving Cloud laboratory, software engineering, machine learning & deep learning, evolutionary deep learning (hyper-parameter optimization), modelling medical systems (Cardiopulmonary bypass machines), computer science education, and educational robotics.

== Biography ==
Chung was born in Seoul, South Korea and earned a B.S. Computer Science degree from Hongik University in 1981. He began his career as a part-time mathematics instructor at the YMCA Academy in Seoul in 1979. From 1981 to 1982, he worked for Korea Electric Power Corporation, developing an online customer information system using COBOL and IMS Databases on an IBM 3031 mainframe.

From 1982 to 1992, Chung was a research scientist at the Electronics and Telecommunications Research Institute (ETRI), where he contributed to the development of TDX switching systems, which later formed the foundation for the first commercialized CDMA system in the world. During this period, he was a visiting researcher at L.M. Ericsson in Stockholm, Sweden, developing telecommunication software modules for the AXE-10 system (1983–1984).

Chung received his Ph.D. in computer science from Wayne State University in 1997. His doctoral research focused on developing a self-adaptive artificial intelligence system inspired by cultural evolution, which was applied to nonlinear function optimization and the training of artificial neural networks.

In 2002, he and his master’s student Wei-Wen Chang won first place in a 3D design optimization competition sponsored by Honda R&D Europe GmbH as part of the IEEE World Congress on Computational Intelligence. In 2022, he was awarded a Research Experiences for Undergraduates (REU) grant by the National Science Foundation.

== Achievements in STEaM, Robotics, and Computer Science Education ==
Chung is the founder of Robofest , an international autonomous robotics competition established in 1999. As of 2025, more than 38,000 students from 18 U.S. states and 25 countries have participated. He has also launched several educational programs integrating computer science, robotics, and STEaM fields, including RoboParade (2006), RoboFashion and Dance Show (2007), Vision Centric Robot Challenge (VCC) (2007), Robot Music Camp (2013), Global Robotics Art Festival (GRAF) (2013), WRO-USA (2014), CS+PA²: Learning Computer Science with Physical Activities and Animation (2018), and Robofest eAcademy (2019).

Since 2003, Chung has served as faculty advisor for Lawrence Technological University’s Intelligent Ground Vehicle Competition (IGVC) teams. His H2Bot team received the first-place design award in 2007 His another team represented the United States in the RoboCup Four-Legged Robot Soccer Division the same year. The BigFoot II IGVC team won the Grand Award LESCOE Cup in 2016. As of 2025, he leads the ACTor (Autonomous Campus TranspORt) project using a fullscale drive-by-wire electric vehicle. The ACTor vehicle team won the Self-Drive Challenge at the IGVC in 2017, 2018, 2019, 2021, 2022, 2023, 2024, and 2025.

In 2011, IEEE USA awarded Chung the Citation of Honor for his contributions to STEM education.

== Honours, Awards and Distinctions ==
- 2026 IEEE STEM Champions
- 2026 Presidential Colloquium Keynote Speaker with $1,000 honorarium, Lawrence Technological University
- 2023 Hsu Family Distinguished Award in Creativity, which includes a $1,000 honorarium and commemorative award, Lawrence Technological University, November 2, 2023
- The Robert Neff Memorial Award, for outstanding contributions to the IEEE Southeast Michigan Section, by the Engineering Society of Detroit Affiliate Council, March 15, 2023
- Engineering Society of Detroit (ESD) GOLD Awards – Outstanding IEEE Member Award, March 11, 2015, at ESD Gold Award Banquet
- Citation of Honor Award, IEEE-USA, "for the leadership in founding the Robofest competition to inspire interest in engineering among pre-college students", March 2011
- MGA Achievement Award, IEEE Member Geographic Activities (MGA) Board, "for inspiring thousands of young students into the science and engineering career path through his Robofest and hands-on robotics workshops", December, 2010
- The Mary E. and Richard E. Marburger Distinguished Achievement Award – 2007 Champion for Institutional Excellence and Preeminence, which includes a $1,000 honorarium and commemorative award, Lawrence Technological University
- Excellent Research Award, Electronics and Telecommunications Research Institute (ETRI), December 31, 1986, Certificate No. 151
