= Bae Eun-mi =

South Korean gymnast (born 1973)

Personal information
- Nationality: South Korean
- Born: 4 January 1973 (age 52)

Sport
- Sport: Gymnastics

- Bae Eun-mi
- Hangul: 배은미
- Hanja: 裴銀美
- RR: Bae Eunmi
- MR: Pae Ŭnmi

Bae Eun-mi (born 4 January 1973) is a South Korean gymnast. She competed in six events at the 1988 Summer Olympics.
