= Joshua E. Siegel =

American mechanical engineer (born 1988)

- Born: September 1988 (age 38); Detroit, Michigan, U.S.
- Education: MIT
- Awards: Lemelson–MIT Student Prize, MassChallenge MassIT Government Innovation Competition Winner, MIT Institute for Soldier Nanotechnology Soldier Design Competition Boeing Prize Winner
- Scientific career
- Fields: Mechanical Engineering, Automotive Engineering
- Thesis: Data Proxies, the Cognitive Layer, and Application Locality: Enablers of Cloud-Connected Vehicles and Next-Generation Internet of Things (2016)
- Doctoral advisor: Sanjay Sarma
- Other academic advisors: Sanjay Sarma, Warren Seering, Maria Yang
- Website: engineering.msu.edu/directory/faculty/jsiegel

Joshua Siegel is an American mechanical engineer, inventor, and professor known for his work in emerging technologies. Siegel has received recognition for his innovative research in vehicle data analysis and diagnostics, including the Lemelson-MIT Student Prize. He currently serves as an Associate Professor of Computer Science and Engineering at Michigan State University.

== Early life and education ==
Siegel grew up near Detroit, Michigan, where he developed an early interest in vehicles and technology. He attended Cranbrook Schools in Bloomfield Hills, Michigan, and was an active member of the school's robotics team. His early passion for restoring and improving vehicles led him to continue researching vehicles at MIT. While at MIT, Siegel ran the Entrepreneurs Club and co-led the Electric Vehicle Team in electrifying a Porsche 914.

Siegel received his S.B. from MIT in 2011, S.M. in 2013, and Ph.D in 2016. His undergraduate thesis described the development of an aftermarket solution for connecting vehicles to the Internet, while his master's work explored the creation of a tamper-resistant vehicle data collection device to support a vehicle miles traveled (VMT) tax. His dissertation developed architectures for the Internet of Things and applied mobile device data to predicting mechanical failures.

== Research ==
Siegel's research at Michigan State University focuses on the development of emerging technologies, with emphasis on resource-efficient diagnostics for mechanical systems. In 2026, he was promoted to associate professor and awarded tenure.

In his capacity as a connected vehicle expert, Siegel has appeared in popular media including PRI's Science Friday and AOL Media's Translogic. Additionally, he has been interviewed and cited in the likes of WIRED and the New York Times.

In addition to his academic career, Siegel serves on the advisory board for Robofest, a global robotics competition for students, fostering interest in STEM education. He is the Principal Investigator for an NSF-funded Research Experiences for Undergraduates (REU) program focused on self-driving vehicles. He founded multiple technology startups, including CarKnow LLC, which developed connected vehicle technologies and won the 2014 MassIT Government Innovation Competition.

Siegel, his work, and his approach to invention were featured in Pathways to Invention, an award-winning documentary featured on PBS.

== Awards ==
In 2008, Siegel won the MIT Institute for Soldier Nanotechnologies Boeing Prize for developing a soldier-portable inertial navigation unit. Siegel was awarded the Lemelson-MIT Student Prize in 2015 for his work in vehicle diagnostics and data collection platforms. He received the 2020 IEEE Sensors Council Best Paper Award, and in 2025, was awarded the SAE International Ralph R. Teetor Educational Award. In 2026, the Michigan State University College of Engineering presented him with a Withrow Teaching Excellence Award.

== Selected Publications ==
Siegel has published numerous peer-reviewed articles and patents in the fields of mechanical engineering, automotive systems, and the Internet of Things.
