= Chung Hyun (sculptor) =

South Korean sculptor (born 1956)

- 정현
- Born: 1956 (age 69–70); Incheon, South Korea
- Education: Hongik University; École nationale supérieure des Beaux-Arts
- Known for: Sculpture
- Notable work: L'homme debout (Standing Man) series
- Awards: MMCA Artist of the Year (2006); Kim Sechoong Sculpture Award (2014); Kim Bok-jin Art Award (2024)

Chung Hyun (Korean: 정현; Hanja: 鄭鉉; born 1956) is a South Korean sculptor. He is known for making sculptures of the human figure from discarded industrial materials such as railway sleepers, asphalt concrete, utility poles, charred wood and scrap metal. He studied sculpture at Hongik University and at the École nationale supérieure des Beaux-Arts in Paris, and was selected as the National Museum of Modern and Contemporary Art (MMCA) Artist of the Year in 2006. He received the Kim Sechoong Sculpture Award in 2014 and the Kim Bok-jin Art Award in 2024. He is represented by PKM Gallery in Seoul.

== Early life and education ==
Chung was born in 1956 in Incheon, South Korea. He studied sculpture at Hongik University, graduating from its College of Fine Arts in 1982 and from its graduate school in 1986. He then moved to France and graduated from the École nationale supérieure des Beaux-Arts in Paris in 1990. He held his first solo exhibition at Gallery Won in Seoul in 1992. He taught as a professor in the sculpture department of the Hongik University graduate school until his retirement.

== Work ==
Chung is known for his L'homme debout (Standing Man) series, made by standing weathered railway sleepers upright as human figures. Since the 2000s he has worked mainly with used-up materials such as railway sleepers, asphalt concrete, utility poles, industrial steel balls, charred wood and scrap metal. He has said that he preserves the original texture of his materials rather than smoothing their surfaces. He also makes bronze heads and drawings using tar. The Korean press has called him "the sculptor of railway sleepers".

== Exhibitions ==
=== Solo exhibitions ===
- 2006 Artist of the Year 2006: Chung Hyun, National Museum of Modern and Contemporary Art, Gwacheon
- 2016 L'homme debout, Palais-Royal Garden, Paris
- 2017 L'homme debout, Domaine national de Saint-Cloud, Paris
- 2018 Chung Hyun, Kumho Museum of Art, Seoul
- 2022 The Portrait of Time: Chung Hyun, Seongbuk Museum of Art, Seoul
- 2023 Mass, Nam-Seoul Museum of Art (Seoul Museum of Art), Seoul
- 2025 A Poem in Humble Materials, Cheongju Museum of Art, Cheongju
- 2025 The Cumulative Burst, PKM Gallery, Seoul

=== Group exhibitions and art fairs ===
- 2002 Gwangju Biennale
- 2004 Busan Biennale Sea Art Festival
- 2016 MMCA Gwacheon 30 Years 1986–2016, National Museum of Modern and Contemporary Art, Gwacheon
- 2017 CRACKS in the Concrete, National Museum of Modern and Contemporary Art, Gwacheon
- 2018 Dakar Biennale Korea special exhibition, Senegal
- 2024 Art Basel Miami Beach, PKM Gallery solo booth

== Awards ==
- 2004 — Artist Today, Kim Chong Yung Museum
- 2006 — Artist of the Year, National Museum of Modern and Contemporary Art
- 2009 — 1st Korean Art Critics Association Award (creative section)
- 2014 — 28th Kim Sechoong Sculpture Award
- 2017 — 11th Woohyeon Art Award (Incheon Foundation for Arts & Culture)
- 2024 — 2nd Kim Bok-jin Art Award (organized by Cheongju Museum of Art)

== Collections ==
Chung's work is held in collections including the National Museum of Modern and Contemporary Art, Leeum Museum of Art, Busan Museum of Art, Daejeon Museum of Art, Gyeonggi Museum of Modern Art, Seoul National University Museum of Art, Pohang Museum of Steel Art, Kumho Museum of Art, Savina Museum of Contemporary Art and Horim Museum.
