= Lee Hun-chung =

South Korean artist (born 1967)

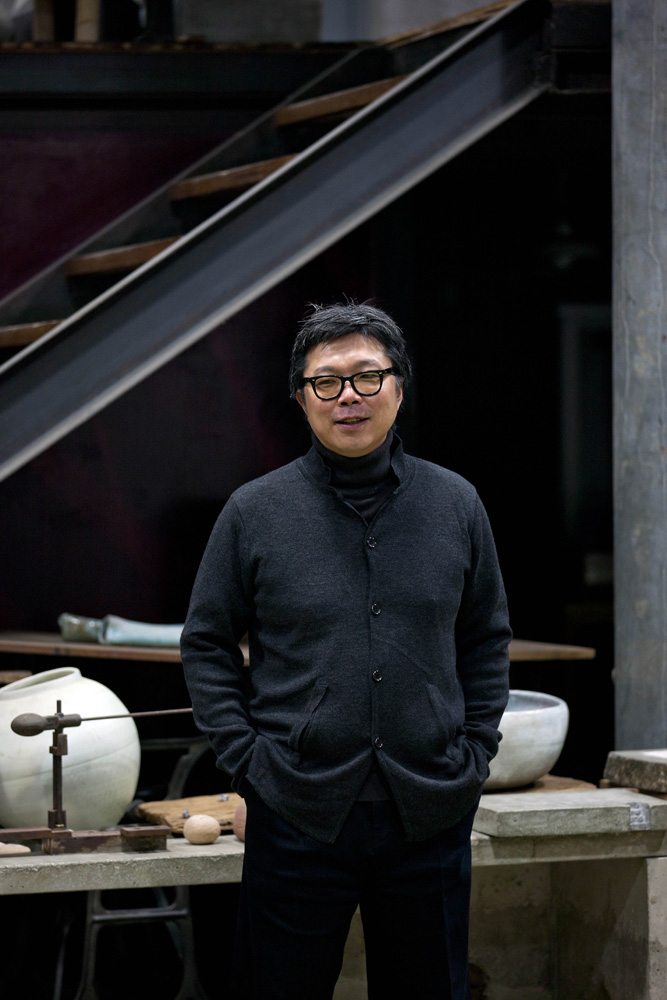
South Korean artist Lee Hun Chung

King Jeongjo's Royal Procession Mosaic (2005)

Lee Hun Chung (이헌정) (born 1967 in Seoul, South Korea) is a South Korean artist. He is famous for working with ceramics and concrete in a wide range from small objects to large installations. Lee creates modern day pieces using techniques and colors dating back to the Joseon Dynasty. Lee attended Hong-ik University in Seoul from 1986–1991 with a BFA in ceramic sculpture. He continued his education throughout San Francisco and Korea, and getting a PH.D in architecture from Kyung-Won University in Gyeonggi-do, South Korea.

== Work ==
- SOLO EXHIBITION
- 2010 LeeHwaik gallery, Seoul, Korea
- 2009 MSU Copeland Gallery, Bozeman, U.S.A
- 2009 On the Table, Daegu, Korea
- 2008 Seomi & tuus Gallery, Seoul, Korea
- 2007 Park Ryu Sook Gallery, JeJu, Korea
- 2007 SP Gallery, Seoul, Korea
- 2006 U-Ri-Gu-Rut RYU, Seoul, Korea
- 2006 Kangha Museum, Yangpeong
- 2005 Wong Gallery, Seoul
- 2004 Gallery Artside, Seoul, Korea
- 2003 Pack Hye Young Gallery, Seoul, Korea
- 2002 U-Ri-Gu-Rut RYU, Seoul, Korea
- 2001 Wong Gallery, Seoul, Korea
- 2001 U-Ri-Gu-Rut RYU, Seoul, Korea
- 2000 The Korean Culture & Art Foundation Art Center, Seoul, Korea
- 2000 Tokonoma Gallery, Geneva, Switzerland
- 2000 U-Ri-Gu-Rut RYU, Seoul, Korea
- 1998 Total Museum, Jangheung, Korea
- 1997 Tho-Dorang, Seoul, Korea
- 1996 Tho-Art Space, Seoul, Korea
- SELECTED GROUP EXHIBITION
- 2015 Korea now! Design, Craft, Fashion and Graphic Design in Korea exhibition, Musée des Arts décoratifs, Paris, France
- 2015 Living In Art II, Connect, Seomi International, Los Angeles, CA, USA
- 2015 Living In Art, Seomi International, Los Angeles, CA, USA.
- 2014 Korean Contemporary Design: EDWARD TYLER NAHEM FINE ART/ NEW YORK, NY, USA
- 2011 Poetry in Clay: Korean Buncheong Ceramics from Leeum, Samsung Museum of Art, The Metropolitan Museum of Art, New York
- 2010 Contemporary Korean Design Show, R20th Gallery, New York, U.S.A
- 2010 Pagus 21.5, Boutique Monaco Museum, Seoul, Korea
- 2010 Design Miami Basel, Miami, U.S.A
- 2009 Sulwha cultural exhibition, Kring, Seoul, Korea
- 2009 Hongik art/design festival, Hongik Univ. Contemporary Museum, Seoul, Korea
- 2009 Design High, Seomi & tuus Gallery, Seoul, Korea
- 2009 Design Miami Basel, Basel, Switzerland
- 2009 Gyeonggi Annual Project Contemporary Ceramic Art, Gyeonggi Museum of Modern Art, Ansan
- 2009 Insa Art Center CLIO 'Cosmetic Jam', Seoul, Korea
- 2009 Gallery Idm "The Party with Ceramic" Busan, Korea
- 2008 Daegu Textile Art Documenta, Daegu Arts & Culture Center, Daegu, Korea
- 2008 Yangpyeong Eco Art Festival_Yangpyeong Project
- 2008 The 2nd China Changchun International Sculpture
- 2007 Suwon Hwaseong Fortress Theatre Festival, Installation Art, Suwon
- 2006 Melbourne Art Fair, Royal Exhibition Building, Melbourne
- Clayarch Gimhae Museum, Gimhae New York S.O.F.A., Regiment Armory, New York
- 2005 From Korea Function &Object D'Art, Hillside Terrace, Tokyo,
- World Trade Art Gallery, New York, Mille Plateaux, Paris
- E-MOMM, E-Wha Womans University A-dong Museum, Seoul
- The Beauty of Korean, Korean Embassy of Venezuela, Venezuela
- 2004 Looking at the Atelier, Insa art center, Seoul
- Sinawi Exhibition, Insa Art Center, Seoul
- 2004 International Exchange Exhibition of The Korean Society of Basic Design & Art,
- Kukmin Univ., Seoul
- Melbourne Art Fair, Royal Exhibition Building, Melbourne, Australia
- 2003 San Francisco International Art Exposition, Park-Ryu_Sook Gallery, CA, U.S.A.
- Park-Ryu_Sook Gallery the 20th Anniversary Exhibition, Seoul
- 2002 Melbourne Art Fair, Royal Exhibition Building, Melbourne, Australia
- Pusan International Art Fair, Bexco, Pusan
- Korean Print Fair, Seoul Arts Center, Seoul
- Korean-Japan craft Exhibition, Sagan Gallery, Seoul
- Artists at Art Fair, Parkryusook Gallery, Seoul
- 2001 Horizon of Crafts, Korean Craft Museum, Chongju
- Archie Bray Foundation 50th Anniversary Clay odyssey Invitation Artist Show,
- Archie Bray Center, Montana, U.S.A.
- Ban-Ban, The Richmond Art Center, Richmond, U.S.A
- The Ware for Gift, U-Ri-Gu-Rut RYU, Seoul, Korea
- Spring Ware, Korean Craft Promotion Foundation, Seoul, Korea
- Ceramic with Flower, Kumgang Art shop, Daecheon
- The Ware for Spring, U-Ri-Gu-Rut RYU, Seoul, Korea
- 2000 Morasai, Sagan Gallery, Seoul, Korea
- The 6th Seoul Print Art Fair, Seoul Metropolitan Museum of Art, Seoul, Korea
- The Rice cake with Vessel, U-Ri-Gu-Rut RYU, Seoul, Korea
- Seoul Living Design Fair, Coex, Seoul
- Melbourne Art Fair, Royal Exhibition Building, Melbourne, Australia
- Millennium Christmas Exhibition, the makers Gallery, Seoul, Korea
- 1999 Wares for The Traditional New Year, Park Ryu Sook Gallery, Seoul, Korea
- Wares for The Spring, Galleria Department Store Oasis Hall, Seoul, Korea
- Ban-Ban, The Korean Culture & Art Foundation Art Center, Seoul, Korea
- Korea and Japan Ceramic Exhibition, NHK Gallery, Osaka, Japan
- Craft Festival-For Weeding, Gana Art Space, Seoul, Korea
- Gift for Full Moon Day, U-Ri-Gu-Rut Ryu, Seoul, Korea
- International Ceramic Expo. Art Fair, Seoul Art Center, Seoul, Korea
- Bosigi Exhibition, U-Ri-Gu-Rut Ryu, Seoul, Korea
- The Ware Around Us, Kais Gallery, Seoul, Korea
- 1998 The Exhibition by Hong-Ik ceramic artist Association,
- The Korean Culture & Art Foundation Art Center, Seoul, Korea
- The Warm ware around Us, Sinsegae Gana Art, Seoul, Korea
- The Wild Flower around Us, Gana Art Space, Seoul, Korea
- The Letter, Gallery Mokumto, Seoul, Korea
- Korean Ceramic Table-Ware for Dessert, Park Ryu Sook Gallery, Seoul, Korea
- Korean ware, Inter Continental Hotel Lobby, Seoul, Korea
- 1997 Spiritual of The Clay, Walkerhill Museum, Seoul, Korea
- Archie Bray Foundation Invitation Artist Show, Archie Bray Center, Montana, U.S.A.
- The Exhibition by Hong-Ik ceramic artist Association, Moonhwa Newspaper Museum, Seoul, Korea
- Joyful Ceramic, Tho-Art Space, Seoul, Korea
- The 4th Tho-Ceramic Contest, Hyundai Art Gallery, Seoul, Korea
- 1996 Jinro International Ceramic Art Exhibition, Hangaram Museum, Seoul, Korea
- San Francisco Art Institute M.F.A. Graduate Show, Fort Mason Gallery, San Francisco, U.S.A
- 1995 Seoul Contemporary Ceramic Art Biennale, Seoul Metropolitan Museum of art, Seoul, Korea
- 1994 San Francisco Art Institute M.F.A. Spring Show, Mabean Gallery, San Francisco, U.S.A
- Korean American Art Festival, Luggage Store Gallery, San Francisco, U.S.A
- 1992 25×25×25, Dangong Gallery, Choi Gallery, Karam Culture Center, Seoul. Daegu, Korea
- 1991 Oceah, sonamoo Gallery, Seoul, Korea
- Young Artist of The 3rd Gallery, The 3rd Gallery, Seoul, Korea
- 1990 Space Behind The Wall, The 3rd Gallery, Seoul, Korea
- FAIRS
- 2015 Design Miami/Basel, Switzerland
- 2014 FOG, San Francisco, CA, USA
- 2014 Collective, New York City, NY, USA
- 2014 The Salon, New York City, NY, USA
- 2013 Design Miami/ Basel, Basel Design Days Dubai, Dubai
- 2012 Design Miami/, Miami, FL
- 2012 PAD, Pavilion of Art & Design, London
- 2012 Design Miami/ Basel, Basel, Switzerland
- 2012 Design Days Dubai, Dubai
- 2011 Design Miami/, Miami, FL
- 2011 Design Miami/ Basel, Basel, Switzerland
- 2010 Design Miami/Basel Miami, FL
- 2010 Design Miami/ Basel, Switzerland
- 2006 Melbourne Art Fair, Royal Exhibition Building, Melbourne
- 2004 Melbourne Art Fair, Royal Exhibition Building, Melbourne
- 2002 Melbourne Art Fair, Royal Exhibition Building, Melbourne
- 2002 Busan International Art Fair, Bexco, Busan
- 2000 Seoul Living Design Fair, Coex, Seoul
- SELECTED COLLECTIONS
- Archie Bray Foundation Center, Montana, USA
- Boleslawiec Museum, Poland
- Dae-yoo Culture Foundation, Seoul, Korea
- Haesley Nine Bridge Golf Club, Yeoju, Korea
- Jinro Foundation of Culture, Seoul, Korea
- Kyung Duk Jin University Museum, China
- Niagara Gallery, Melbourne, Australia National Museum of Contemporary Art,
- National Museum of Modern and Contemporary Art, Korea, Seoul, Korea
