= Battle of Chilcheollyang =

Naval battle in the Imjin War

Coordinates: 34.8181°N 128.566°E

- Part of Imjin War
Date	28 August 1597
Location	Chilcheollyang, near Geoje, South Korea
Result	Japanese victory

Belligerents
Forces of Toyotomi Hideyoshi	Joseon

Commanders and leaders
Tōdō Takatora; Katō Yoshiaki; Wakisaka Yasuharu; Konishi Yukinaga; Shimazu Yoshihiro; Kuki Yoshitaka	Wŏn Kyun †; Ch'oe Ho †; Yi Ŏkki †; Pae Sŏl; Pae Hŭngnip

Strength
500–1,000 ships Approximately 140,000 men	Up to 200 ships

Casualties and losses
Minimal	188 ships destroyed

The Battle of Chilcheollyang was a naval engagement fought during the night of 28 August 1597, as part of the Imjin War. In this battle, the Japanese fleet decisively defeated the Joseon navy, destroying nearly the entire Korean fleet.

== Background ==
Prior to the battle, the previous naval commander Yi Sun-sin had been removed from his post due to a Japanese plot. The less experienced Wŏn Kyun was promoted in Yi's place. Wŏn Kyun set sail for Busan on 17 August with the entire fleet, some 200 ships.

== Battle ==
The Korean fleet arrived near Busan on 20 August in 1597. As the day was about to end, they met a force of 500 to 1,000 Japanese ships arrayed against them. Wŏn Kyun, leading his first and only naval engagement, ordered a general attack on the enemy armada, but the Japanese fell back, letting the Koreans pursue. After a few back and forth exchanges, with one chasing the other, one retreating, the Japanese turned around one last time, destroying 30 ships and scattering the Korean fleet.

Wŏn's men docked at Gadeokdo and ran ashore to find water where they were ambushed by 3,000 enemy troops under Shimazu Yoshihiro. They lost 400 men and several vessels.

From Gadeok, Wŏn retreated north and west into the strait between Geoje and the island of Chilchon, Chilchonnyang. Wŏn Kyun then retired to his flagship and refused to see anyone. The entire fleet sat in the strait for an entire week.

The Japanese commanders convened on 22 August to plan a joint assault on the Koreans. Shimazu Yoshihiro ferried 2,000 of his men to Geoje, where he arrayed them on the northwest coast, overlooking the Korean fleet below.

On the night of 28 August, a Japanese fleet of 500 ships moved into the strait and attacked. By dawn, nearly all the Korean ships had been destroyed.

Wŏn Kyun fled to the mainland but could not keep up with his men. He sat down under a pine tree until the Japanese found him. It is assumed that his head was cut off.

Yi Ŏkki also died during the battle after drowning himself.

== Aftermath ==
Prior to the destruction on 28 August, Pae Sŏl shifted 12 ships to an inlet farther down the strait and managed to escape. Pae Sŏl set fire to the camps at Hansando before the Japanese arrived. He then sailed west with the remaining 12 ships, all that was left of the Korean navy.

== Bibliography ==
- Alagappa, Muthiah (2003), Asian Security Order: Instrumental and Normative Features, Stanford University Press, ISBN 0-8047-4629-X
- Arano, Yasunori (2005), The Formation of a Japanocentric World Order, International Journal of Asian Studies
- Brown, Delmer M. (May 1948), "The Impact of Firearms on Japanese Warfare, 1543–1598", The Far Eastern Quarterly, 7 (3), Association for Asian Studies: 236–53, doi:10.2307/2048846, JSTOR 2048846, S2CID 162924328
- Eikenberry, Karl W. (1988), "The Imjin War", Military Review, 68 (2): 74–82
- Ha, Tae-hung; Sohn, Pow-key (1977), 'Nanjung Ilgi: War Diary of Admiral Yi Sun-sin, Yonsei University Press, ISBN 89-7141-018-3
- Haboush, JaHyun Kim (2016), The Great East Asian War and the Birth of the Korean Nation
- Hawley, Samuel (2005), The Imjin War, The Royal Asiatic Society, Korea Branch/UC Berkeley Press, ISBN 89-954424-2-5
- Hawley, Samuel (2014), The Imjin War: Japan's Sixteenth-Century Invasion of Korea and Attempt to Conquer China, Conquistador Press, ISBN 978-0-9920786-2-1
- Jang, Pyun-soon (1998), Noon-eu-ro Bo-nen Han-gook-yauk-sa 5: Gor-yeo Si-dae (눈으로 보는 한국역사 5: 고려시대), Park Doo-ui, Bae Keum-ram, Yi Sang-mi, Kim Ho-hyun, Kim Pyung-sook, et al., Joog-ang Gyo-yook-yaun-goo-won. 1998-10-30. Seoul, Korea.
- Kim, Ki-chung (Fall 1999), "Resistance, Abduction, and Survival: The Documentary Literature of the Imjin War (1592–8)", Korean Culture, 20 (3): 20–29
- Kim, Yung-sik (1998), "Problems and Possibilities in the Study of the History of Korean Science", Osiris, 2nd Series, 13: 48–79, doi:10.1086/649280, JSTOR 301878, S2CID 143724260
- 桑田忠親 [Kuwata, Tadachika], ed., 舊參謀本部編纂, [Kyu Sanbo Honbu], 朝鮮の役 [Chousen no Eki] (日本の戰史 [Nihon no Senshi] Vol. 5), 1965.
- Neves, Jaime Ramalhete (1994), "The Portuguese in the Im-Jim War?", Review of Culture, 18: 20–24
- Niderost, Eric (June 2001), "Turtleboat Destiny: The Imjin War and Yi Sun Shin", Military Heritage, 2 (6): 50–59, 89
- Niderost, Eric (January 2002), "The Miracle at Myongnyang, 1597", Osprey Military Journal, 4 (1): 44–50
- Park, Yune-hee (1973), Admiral Yi Sun-shin and His Turtleboat Armada: A Comprehensive Account of the Resistance of Korea to the 16th Century Japanese Invasion, Shinsaeng Press
- Rockstein, Edward D. (1993), Strategic And Operational Aspects of Japan's Invasions of Korea 1592–1598 1993-6-18, Naval War College
- Sadler, A. L. (June 1937), "The Naval Campaign in the Korean War of Hideyoshi (1592–1598)", Transactions of the Asiatic Society of Japan, Second Series, 14: 179–208
- Sansom, George (1961), A History of Japan 1334–1615, Stanford University Press, ISBN 0-8047-0525-9
- Sohn, Pow-key (April–June 1959), "Early Korean Painting", Journal of the American Oriental Society, 79 (2): 96–103, doi:10.2307/595851, JSTOR 595851
- Stramigioli, Giuliana (December 1954), "Hideyoshi's Expansionist Policy on the Asiatic Mainland", Transactions of the Asiatic Society of Japan, Third Series, 3: 74–116
- Strauss, Barry (Summer 2005), "Korea's Legendary Admiral", MHQ: The Quarterly Journal of Military History, 17 (4): 52–61
- Swope, Kenneth M. (2006), "Beyond Turtleboats: Siege Accounts from Hideyoshi's Second Invasion of Korea, 1597–1598", Sungkyun Journal of East Asian Studies, 6 (2), Academy of East Asian Studies: 177–206
- Swope, Kenneth M. (2005), "Crouching Tigers, Secret Weapons: Military Technology Employed During the Sino-Japanese-Korean War, 1592–1598", The Journal of Military History, 69, Society for Military History: 11–42, doi:10.1353/jmh.2005.0059, S2CID 159829515
- Swope, Kenneth M. (December 2002), "Deceit, Disguise, and Dependence: China, Japan, and the Future of the Tributary System, 1592–1596", The International History Review, 24 (4): 757–1008, doi:10.1080/07075332.2002.9640980, S2CID 154827808
- Swope, Kenneth M. (2009), A Dragon's Head and a Serpent's Tail: Ming China and the First Great East Asian War, 1592–1598, University of Oklahoma Press
- Tucker, Spencer C. (23 December 2009), A Global Chronology of Conflict: From the Ancient World to the Modern Middle East [6 volumes]: From the Ancient World to the Modern Middle East, ABC-CLIO, ISBN 978-1-85109-672-5
- Turnbull, Stephen (2002), Samurai Invasion: Japan's Korean War 1592–98, Cassell & Co, ISBN 0-304-35948-3
- Turnbull, Stephen (2008), The Samurai Invasion of Korea 1592-98, Osprey Publishing Ltd
- Turnbull, Stephen (1998), The Samurai Sourcebook, Cassell & Co, ISBN 1-85409-523-4
- Villiers, John (1980), SILK and Silver: Macau, Manila and Trade in the China Seas in the Sixteenth Century (A lecture delivered to the Hong Kong Branch of the Royal Asiatic Society at the Hong Kong Club. 10 June 1980)
- Yi, Min-woong (2004), Imjin Wae-ran Haejeonsa: The Naval Battles of the Imjin War [임진왜란 해전사], Chongoram Media [청어람미디어], ISBN 89-89722-49-7
