= Joshua A. Siegel =

American orthopedic surgeon

- Born: September 26, 1966 (age 59); Williamsville, New York
- Citizenship: United States
- Education: State University of New York at Buffalo; Northwestern University, Chicago
- Occupation: Orthopedic surgeon
- Known for: Orthopedic surgery
- Medical career
- Sub-specialties: Orthopedic surgery Sports medicine, Arthroscopy

Joshua A. Siegel (born September 26, 1966) is an American orthopedic surgeon and director of sports medicine. He is known for engaging arthroscopic surgical techniques in treating professional athletes and sports teams. He has been listed as Top Doctor six times by New Hampshire magazine. He is listed among the "59 Orthopaedic Surgeons Recommended by Healthcare Leaders". He is also listed among the "125 Knee Surgeons and Specialists to Know".

== Early life and education ==
Joshua A. Siegel was born in Williamsville, New York. He holds a Bachelor of Science degree from Northwestern University, Chicago, Illinois. He holds a medical degree, summa cum laude, from the State University of New York at Buffalo (SUNY Buffalo), Buffalo, New York. He did his residency in orthopedic surgery at the SUNY Health Science Center, Syracuse, New York, and his fellowship in sports medicine at the American Sports Medicine Institute, Birmingham, Alabama, under Dr. James Andrews and Dr. William Clancy.

== Medical career ==
Siegel specializes in orthopedic surgery, sports medicine, arthroscopy, and other surgical related areas. He runs his medical career as a director of sports medicine and orthopedic surgeon at Access Sports Medicine and Orthopedics in Exeter, New Hampshire. He was the first physician in the New Hampshire Seacoast region to offer Arthrosurface Nanofactor Flow, a non-invasive pain relief treatment meant for joint inflammation, arthritis and damaged cartilage.

Siegel is a physician for the U.S. Ski Team, US Snowboarding Team, US Olympic committee, US Golf Association Team, professional athletes, and some New Hampshire high school sports teams. He is a founding member of North-east Surgical Care in Newington, New Hampshire. He is a fellow of the American Academy of Orthopaedic Surgeons, and a member of the American Orthopaedic Society for Sports Medicine.

In 2010, Siegel was honored with a Business Excellence Award by New Hampshire Business Review. In 2013, he was recognized among Castle Connolly's Top Doctors for Exeter, New Hampshire region.

== See also ==
- Orthopaedic sports medicine
