= Bae Se-hwa =

South Korean artist (born 1980)

Bae Se-hwa (Korean: 배세화; born 1980 in Seoul, South Korea) is a South Korean artist. He is famous for working with steam bent walnut wood to create fluid and elegant curves in his artwork. Bae's inspiration comes from traditional Korean's interpretation of beauty and the harmony of nature. Bae attended Hongik University in Seoul, and received his BFA in Woodworking & Furniture Design.

== Works ==
=== Selected exhibitions ===
- 2015 Korea now! Design, Craft, Fashion and Graphic Design in Korea exhibition, Musée des Arts décoratifs, Paris, France
- 2015 Living In Art II, Connect, Seomi International, Los Angeles, CA, USA
- 2015 Living In Art I, Let's Art, Seomi International, Los Angeles, CA, USA
- 2013 Contemporary Korean Design 2, R20th Century Gallery, New York
- 2011 Bae Se Hwa, Steam Series, Haunch of Venison, London
- 2010 Beyond the Ceramics, Icheon World Ceramic Center, Icheon
- Show Hand-Arty Fair, Hillstate Gallery, Seoul
- 10/10, Dong-dae-mun Design Plaza & Park Gallery, Seoul
- Korea –Canada Craft, Vancouver
- 2009 Indoor Design for Life, Clayarch, Seoul
- Seoul Design Festival, COEX, Seoul
- Korea Tomorrow, SETEC, Seoul
- Cheongju International Craft Biennale 2009, Cheongju
- Design Cube, Seoul
- DMY-design my youngster, Arena, Berlin
- 2008 Lighting Design Collection, Raemian Gallery, Seoul
- Som Ri Culture & Arts Hall, Ik-san
- Nipponlife2008
- Japanese Wooden Furniture and Living Equipment, Tokyo
- Seoul Design Olympiad, Seoul
- Gana Art Center/Craftshop, Seoul
- Seoul Design Festival, COEX, Seoul
- Asahikawa Furniture Center, Asahikawa

=== Awards ===
- 2009 Gold Prize, Gyeong’gi Furniture Competition, Korea
- 2008 Special Prize, The Steering Committee of Korea Arts and Crafts, Korea
- Hong-Rim Prize, Korea
- Silverleaf, International Furniture Design Fair Ahsahikawa, Japan
- Most wanted, Living Design Awards, Korea
- 2006 Winner, Furniture Guide Competition, Korea
- Silver Prize, Gyeong’gi Furniture Competition, Korea
- 2005 Finalist, Cheongju International Furniture Competition, Korea

=== Collections ===
- Amore Pacific Museum, Korea
- CJ, Korea
- Green Cross, Korea
- FAIRS
- 2013 Design Miami/Basel, Basel Design Days Dubai, Dubai, Design Miami/Miami
- 2012 Design Miami/, MiamiPAD, Pavilion of Art & Design, LondonDesign Miami/Basel, Basel
- 2011 Design Miami/, MiamiDesign Miami/Basel, Basel
- 2010 Design Miami/, MiamiDesign Miami/Basel, BaselSeoul Living Design Fair, COEX, Seoul
- 2009 KIAF/Korea International Art Fair, COEX, Seoul Design Fair Sol-Sol, COEX, SeoulKorea Art Gallery Fair, BEXCO, BusanSeoul Auction Show, COEX, by Gallery SEOMI, Seoul Fuori Salone, Milan
- 2008 Craft Trend Fair, COEX, SeoulSeoul Living Design Fair, COEX, Seoul
- 2006 Seoul Living Design Fair, COEX, SeoulCraft Fair, COEX, Seoul Seoul Home Deco, COEX, SeoulKofurn, Kintex, Gyeong’gi
