= Bae Jeong-min =

South Korean voice actress

Bae Jeong-min (Korean: 배정민) is a South Korean voice actress.

She joined the Munhwa Broadcasting Corporation's voice acting division in 1999.

== Roles ==
=== Broadcast TV ===
- Magical DoReMi (Korea TV Edition, MBC)
- Doraemon (Korea TV Edition, MBC)
- Bikkuriman (Bumerang Fighter, Korea TV Edition, MBC)
- Atlantis King (MBC)
- Fairy World Adventure (MBC)
- Jimmy Neutron (Korea TV Edition, MBC)
- Tommy & Oscar (Korea TV edition, MBC)
- Fruits Basket (Korea TV Edition, AniOne)
- The Cat returns - plays as Yuki the cat (2002)
- Oh! Mikey - plays Laura

=== Film dubbing ===
- Crayon Shin Chan (Film edition, Korea TV edition, MBC)

== See also ==
- Munhwa Broadcasting Corporation
- MBC Voice Acting Division
