= Robofest =

American youth competitive robotics league

Logo

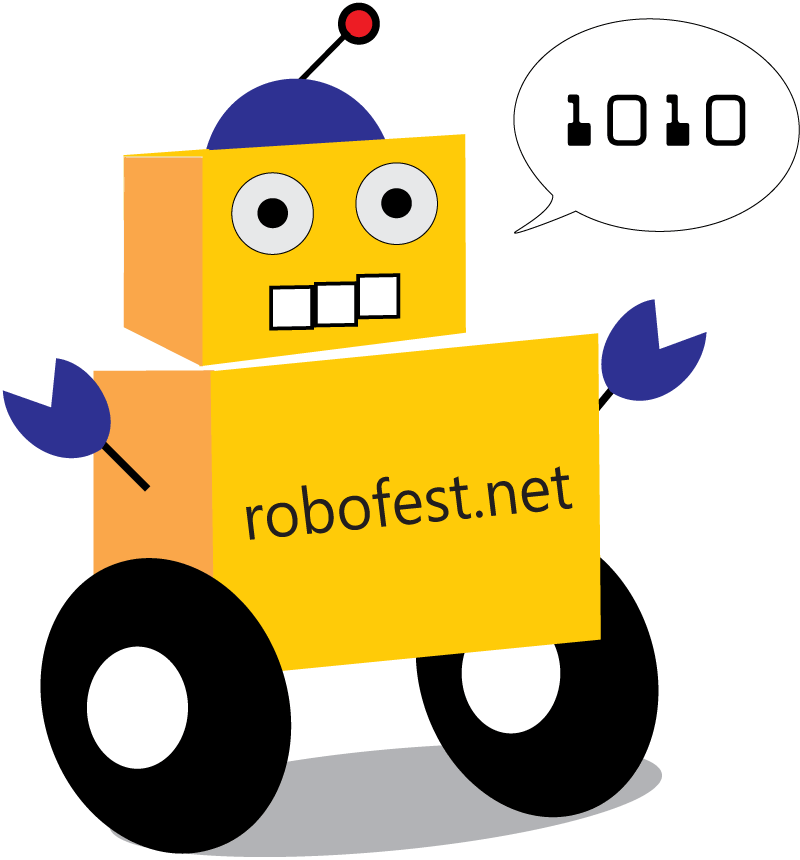
Mascot

Robofest is an autonomous robotics competition for 4th - 12th graders. Students are allowed to use any robotics system, parts, materials, or even custom electronics, in some of the events. Games have UTF (Unknown Tasks and Factors) components; students must solve the unveiled tasks and factors within 30 minutes of work-time without external help. Lawrence Tech's Robofest was founded by Computer Science Professor Dr. Chan-Jin Chung (or popularly known as CJ Chung) in 1999–2000 academic year and is sponsored by Lawrence Technological University and other sponsors. LTU's Robofest is also held internationally, in countries including Brazil, Canada, China, Colombia, Ecuador, Egypt, Ethiopia, England, France, Ghana, Greece, Hong Kong, Hungary, India, Kenya, Lebanon, Macau, Malawi, Mexico, Morocco, Nigeria, Philippines, Saudi Arabia, Singapore, South Africa, South Korea, Taiwan, Jordan, Palestine, and UAE. Teams who win their regional event are welcome to participate at the worldwide tournament held at Lawrence Technological University in Michigan. ROBOFEST is a registered trademark of Lawrence Technological University. Robofest is one of the largest University led robotics competitions in the world for pre college students.

Grants are available from the Michigan Department of Education (MDE) robotics competition program, funded through section 99h of the State School Aid Act for LTU Robofest teams in Michigan.

== Competition categories ==
There are a total of eight different competition categories in Robofest.

- Game Competition - Students compete with two robots to work together autonomously to complete the given missions. The missions change per year, and an "unknown challenge" must be adapted to on the competition day.
- Exhibition - Robotic contraptions to do the designers task.
- Vision Centric Challenge (Vcc, formerly Mini Urban Challenge) - Robots drive along a realistic road, stopping at "traffic lights" drawn on the road.
- RoboArts - (Formerly GRAF). Robotic Music, Fashion & Dance, Robotic Painting, and Interactive Kinetic Sculptures
- UMC (Unknown Mission Challenge) - Mission tasks will be totally unknown until the day of competition
- BottleSumo - Robots compete to either push a bottle or the other robot off of a table.
- RoboParade - A parade of autonomous robotic floats
- RoboMed - High School and College teams create intelligent and interactive medical robotics/device projects
- DroneQuest (New in 2027)
- BipedQuest (New in 2027)

Retired competition categories include:

- Robosumo - Competing robots attempt to push each other out of the ring.
- VEX Pentathlon - VEX robots compete in five events.
- RoboFashion and Dance Show - Costumed robots present themselves on a track.
- VEX Bridge Battle - Two VEX robots compete on a bridge.

== Competition age divisions ==
- Junior: (4th or) 5th-8th graders can compete with an easier unknown tasks and factors
- Senior: 9th-12th graders can compete with a somewhat harder unknown tasks and factors
- Collegiate: discontinued.

== Executive directors ==
- Christopher Cartwright, 2024-
- Elmer Santos, 2023-2024
- Christopher Cartwright, 2021-2023
- Chan-Jin Chung, 1999-2020

== Notable alumni ==
- Joshua E. Siegel
- Sang Hun Oh
- Ian Villa
- Phil Bigos

== Other Robofests ==
The word RoboFest was used for a robot event by the Robot Group of Austin, Texas. at least as early as 1989. The Robot Group had a yearly RoboFest through the 1990s. There are various other Robofests not connected to Lawrence Tech's Robofest.
