= Pae Hŭngnip =

Korean admiral (1546–1608)

- 배흥립
- Born: November 7, 1546
- Died: October 17, 1608 (aged 61); Hanyang, Joseon Korea
- Military career
- Allegiance: Joseon Korea
- Rank: Second junior rank (종2품)
- Nickname: Paekki
- Conflicts: Imjin War; Battle of Okpo; Battle of Hansando; Battle of Haengju; Chongyu War; Battle of Chilcheollyang; Battle of Myeongnyang; Battle of Noryang

Korean name
- Hangul: 배흥립
- Hanja: 裵興立
- RR: Bae Heungrip
- MR: Pae Hŭngnip

Courtesy name
- Hangul: 백기
- Hanja: 伯起
- RR: Baekgi
- MR: Paekki

Posthumous name
- Hangul: 효숙
- Hanja: 孝肅
- RR: Hyosuk
- MR: Hyosuk

Pae Hŭngnip (Korean: 배흥립; Hanja: 裵興立; November 7, 1546 – October 17, 1608) was a Korean military official of the mid-Joseon Period. He was a general under Admiral Yi Sun-sin during the Imjin War.

== Life ==
Pae Hŭngnip was born on November 7, 1546. He passed the military examination in 1572 and became a Herald (선전관; 宣傳官). Later, he has served as a prefect of Gyeolseong and Heungyang. Before the outbreak of the Imjin War, battleships were built by him following Yi Sun-sin's orders to prepare for the war.

When the Japanese Invasion of Korea broke out in 1592, he was appointed as the Assistant Defense Commandant (조방장; 助防將) and also served as a Defense Commander (방어사; 防禦使). Serving as the Front Commandant (전부장; 前部將) in the Admiral Yi's first campaign and Wŏn Kyun's Rear Commandant (후부장; 後部將) in the Battle of Sacheon, he was promoted to t'ongjŏng (통정; 通政; Thoroughly Administrative), third senior rank. In 1596, He was appointed to the magistrate of Jangheung, but he was dismissed for being criticized for wasting grains with a large number of shameless warriors. In 1597, he was deprived of his position as a Naval Commander of Left Gyeongsang Province (경상좌수사; 慶尙左水使). Later, he was appointed as Pae Sŏl's Assistant Defense Commandant.

In 1597, when the Japanese second invasion broke out, he participated in the Battle of Chilcheollyang under the command of Wŏn Kyun, the Naval Generalissimo of the Three Provinces (삼도수군통제사; 三道水軍統制使). When Yi Ŏkki and Ch'oe Ho were killed in action, Wŏn Kyun and Pae Sŏl also fled in the Battle of Chilcheollyang, he rushed to the enemy camp with only one ship he was riding. He rescued the remaining ships and fought to the end to delay the enemy's advance. When Yi Sun-sin returned to his position after Wŏn Kyun's defeat, he participated in the Battle of Myeongnyang and Noryang and was promoted to the second junior rank.

In 1600, he served as a Naval Commander of Right Gyeongsang Province and as a Naval Commander of Left Jeolla Province. In 1604, he served as a Naval Commander of Chungcheong Province and the Second Minister of Public Works (공조참판; 工曹參判). In 1607, he became a magistrate of Yeongheung, but he resigned the following year due to illness and returned to Hanyang. He died of illness at his home in Hanyang on October 17, 1608.

== See also ==
- History of Korea
- Naval history of Korea
