= Bae Ki-suk =

South Korean boxer (1987–2010)

Bae Ki-Suk
Personal information
- Nationality: South Korean
- Born: Bae Ki-Suk; May 29, 1987 Pusan, South Korea
- Died: July 20, 2010 (aged 23) Daejeon, South Korea
- Height: 171 cm (5 ft 7 in)
- Weight: Super flyweight

Boxing career
- Stance: Orthodox

Boxing record
- Total fights: 15
- Wins: 7
- Win by KO: 4
- Losses: 7
- Draws: 1
- No contests: 0

Bae Ki-suk (Korean: 배기석; May 29, 1987 – July 21, 2010) was a South Korean boxer who died following a boxing match on July 17, 2010.

== Boxing incident ==
Bae fought for the South Korean super flyweight title against Jung Jin-ki in Yesan, Chungcheongnam-do on July 17, 2010. He underwent five hours of brain surgery after a TKO defeat. After the operation, his body temperature, blood pressure and pulse returned to almost normal, but he remained unconscious, and Bae died four days after the bout, on July 21.

The accident came in the wake of a similar case two-and-a-half years ago. On Christmas Day in 2007, the former WBC light flyweight champion Choi Yo-Sam collapsed and died in January 2008 after a match against Heri Amol.

"After the clash, Bae lost consciousness and we sent him to hospital," Korea Boxing Commission (KBC) Commissioner Kim Jae-bong said.

Many boxing critics said the match should not have been sanctioned by the KBC. Bae, who had a 7–7 record with 5 KOs, was beaten by a knockout in 2009 and also lost in the fourth round, again by knockout in October. However, he even moved up a weight class for the fight, with the KBC having approved the 10-round South Korean title match.
