= Bae Myung-hoon =

South Korean science fiction writer

Bae Myung-hoon (Korean: 배명훈; born 1978) is a South Korean science fiction writer. He has written ten novels, over fifty short stories and novellas, and numerous essays. He is best known for his composite novel Taweo (타워 Tower) and short story collection Anyeong, ingongjonjae (안녕, 인공존재 Hello, The Artificial Being!). He was named one of the “ten best science fiction writers in South Korea” by The Science Times in 2012.

== Life ==
Bae Myung-hoon was born in Busan, South Korea in 1978. He earned his bachelor's and master's degrees in international relations at Seoul National University. He made his literary debut in 2005 when his short story “Seumateu D” (스마트D Smart D) won the SF Creative Writing Contest for best short story.

== Writing ==
Bae Myung-hoon started writing science fiction from 2005. His debut, "Smart D", portrays the struggles of a sf novelist who is forced to abandon the use of the letter D out of legal troubles with a multinational corporation. Myung-hoon blurs the line between genre fiction and literary fiction. South Korean literary circles tend to make a clear distinction between the two; critics and writers who associate themselves with literary fiction rarely show interest in genre fiction. Yet Bae is a notable exception, attracting the attention of literary critics and publishers since the publication of his first full-length book Taweo (타워 Tower) in 2009. A social science fiction novel with strong satirical undertones, Taweo is considered to be his breakthrough work.

That same year, his short story “Anyeong, ingongjonjae” (안녕, 인공존재 Hello, The Artificial Being!) appeared in the literary journal Munhakdongne, which was unusual considering that science fiction in South Korea is often published in online communities instead of more traditional outlets such as literary journals or publishers. The short story won the 2010 Munhakdongne Young Writers’ Award, receiving the following comment from a judge: “Based on his impressive knowledge of space science, Bae Myung-hoon successfully portrays the pent-up frustrations of human existence erupting in the vast universe.” Bae expanded “Anyoung, ingongjonjae” into a collection of short stories and published it in 2010. In the afterword to the book, literary critic Shin Hyeong-cheol writes: “his works have a stylistic variety that cannot be defined by a single genre, but that variety is only a means to an end . . . his ultimate goal is to explore serious anthropological questions."

While imaginative science fiction elements help differentiate Bae’s works from mainstream South Korean fiction, some critics see them as a creative limitation. In the same afterword quoted above, Shin Hyeong-cheol notes that “Bae’s stories are delightfully clear, but that clarity seems to come at an inevitable price. His characters are too clear . . . rather than having a palpable presence, they are there to serve a function; once you finish reading, the story leaves a vivid impression but the people fade away.”

== Works ==
- 빙글빙글 우주군 (2020) { Launch Something! (2020) }
- 고고심령학자 (2017) { Spiritual Archaeologist (2017) }
- 푸른파 피망 (2017) { Paprika on Planet Pureunpa (2017) }
- 예술과 중력가속도 (2016) { Art and the Acceleration of Gravity (2016) }
- 첫숨 (2015) { First Breath (2015) }
- 맛집 폭격 (2014) { The Bombing of Great Restaurants (2014) }
- 가마틀 스타일 (2014) { Gamateul Style (2014) }
- 청혼 (2013) { The Proposal (2013) }
- 총통 각하 (2012) { Sir Chancellor (2012) }
- 은닉 (2012) { Decoy (2012) }
- 신의 궤도 (2011) { Divine Orbit (2011) }
- 끼익끼익의 아주 중대한 임무 (2011) { The Very Important Mission of Creaky (2011) }
- 안녕, 인공존재! (2010) { Hello, The Artificial Being! (2010) }
- 타워 (2009) { Tower (2009) }

=== Works in translation ===
- Bae, Myung Hoon; Koo, Se-Woong (2013). "Art and the Acceleration of Gravity". Azalea. 6 (1): 157–178. doi:10.1353/aza.2013.0009. S2CID 120948604. Project MUSE 505132.
- Ryu, Sung; Myung-Hoon, Bae (2023). "The Aspiration for Cha-Ka-Ta-Pa". Kenyon Review. 45 (2): 59–70. Project MUSE 889883.

== Awards ==
- 2010: Munhakdongne Young Writers’ Award
- 2005: SF Creative Writing Contest for best short story
- 2004: SNU Press Literary Award
