= Minorities in Korea =

Korea has always been a highly ethnically and linguistically homogeneous nation, however some minorities in Korea exist. Since recent decades, South Korea has become home to a number of foreign residents (5.3%), whereas isolated North Korea has not experienced this trend.

Minorities in North Korea include groups of repatriated Koreans, small religious communities, and migrants from neighboring China and Japan. North Korea largely remains ethnically homogeneous with a small Chinese expatriate community and a few Japanese people.

With regard to minorities in South Korea, in 2022, the percent of foreigners in South Korea has risen to 4.37%, or 2,245,912 people. Half of this population was Chinese (849,804), followed by Vietnamese (235,007), Thais (201,681) and Americans (156,562). In 2025, the percent of foreigners in South Korea has risen to 5.3%, or 2.73 million people. Half of this population was Chinese (958,959), followed by Vietnamese (305,936), Thais (188,770) and Americans (170,251).

== History ==
In 1882, King Gojong called foreigners "uneducated louts", motivated by "lechery and sensuality". The Joseon Dynasty was widely referred to as a "hermit kingdom" for sealing itself off from foreign influence. Joseon diplomacy mainly involved the Sadae ("serving the great") policy toward Imperial China. Concurrently maintained (and jointly referred to as Korean: 사대교린 정책; Hanja: 事大交隣政策; lit. serving the great and relations with neighbor policy) was the Gyorin policy of amicable relations with neighbouring countries; however this did not result in significant influx of foreign persons but rather sporadic trade delegations and diplomatic missions: envoys from the Ryūkyū Kingdom were received by Taejo of Joseon in 1392, 1394 and 1397. Siam sent an envoy to Taejo's court in 1393.

The Joseon kingdom made every effort to maintain a friendly bilateral relationship with China for reasons having to do with both realpolitik and a more idealist Confucian worldview wherein China was seen as the center of a Confucian moral universe. In the fifth through tenth centuries, Arabs sailed the Indian Ocean, and Arab merchants and sailors eventually landed in Korea during the Silla dynasty. These contacts eventually broke off starting in the fifteenth century, resulting in the Arabs' eventual assimilation into the Korean population.

== North Korea ==
While North Korea is ethnically and linguistically homogeneous, some minorities in North Korea exist. They include groups of repatriated Koreans, small religious communities, and migrants from neighboring China and Japan.

The historical Jaegaseung ethnic group of descendants of Jurchen people used to inhabit villages of their own, under lay monastic orders, until the 1960s. These monastic communities were perceived as antisocialist and the Jaegaseung people were assimilated with the Korean people. There is also a community of ethnic Chinese people, known as huaqiao, that is in decline due to migration to China. While in the 1980s, Chinese people living in North Korea enjoyed privileged access to trips abroad, today many of them have permanently moved to China. The Japanese community in North Korea has diverse origins. Former Japanese prisoners of war in the Soviet Union, Japanese spouses of repatriated Zainichi Koreans, defecting members of the Japanese Red Army, and Japanese people abducted by North Korea live in the country.

There are small communities of Indians and Americans in North Korea. Religious communities, such as Chondoists, Buddhists and Christians, exist in the country. The Chondoist are also portrayed as the embodiment of the 19th century Donghak Peasant Revolution with their Chondoist Chongu Party, a minor party closely collaborating with the ruling Workers' Party of Korea.

A number of communities consist of ethnic Koreans who have repatriated to the Korean peninsula. Some 50,000 to 70,000 ethnic Koreans living in China migrated to North Korea in the wake of the famine following Mao Zedong's Great Leap Forward and repression of ethnic minorities during the Cultural Revolution. The influx forced the North Korean government to construct refugee camps to house the immigrants. Between 100,000 and 150,000 ethnic Koreans formerly living in Japan, and their descendants, form the community of repatriated Zainichi Koreans in North Korea. Their repatriation took place between 1959 and 1980. During the 1960s and 1970s, they maintained affluence from their Japanese stay, but their wealth was consumed by the North Korean famine of the 1990s. Their communities remain tight, with marriages mostly from within the group, and separate from the rest of the North Korean society. The Soviet Union had one of the largest Korean minorities abroad, but less than 10,000 of them have repatriated to North Korea, where they have been assimilated into the rest of the society.

== South Korea ==
Foreign nationals in South Korea population pyramid in 2021

South Korea is among the world's most ethnically homogeneous nations, i.e. those with majority of the population of one ethnicity. Since the end of the Korean War in 1953, South Korea has been far more open to foreign influence, especially American.

There were 1,741,919 total foreign residents in Korea in 2015, compared to 1,576,034 in 2013. As of September 2015, according to the Ministry of Government Administration and Home Affairs, the foreign population in South Korea, including migrant workers, increased to 1.8 million, accounting for 3.4% of the total population. In 2022, the percent of foreigners in South Korea has risen to 4.37%, or 2,245,912 people. In 2025, the percent of foreigners in South Korea has risen to 5.3%, or 2.73 million people. Half of this population was Chinese (958,959), followed by Vietnamese (305,936), Thais (188,770) and Americans (170,251).

The biggest group of foreigners in Korea are the Chinese, including Joseonjok (Korean: 조선족; Hanja: 朝鮮族, Chinese citizens of Korean descent) and Han Chinese; ethnic Chinese in Korea are known as Hwagyo (화교; 華僑) by the Koreans. In 1970, an estimated 120,000 Chinese resided in South Korea. In the 10-year period starting in the late 1990s, the number of Chinese in Korea exploded. In the mid-2000s it was estimated that there are at least 300,000 and possibly more than 1,000,000. As of 2016, there were 710,000 Chinese nationals living in Korea, of which ethnic Koreans from China accounted for 500,000, Chinese 190,000 and Taiwanese 20,000. Together, they accounted for 51.6 percent of all foreigners in Korea.

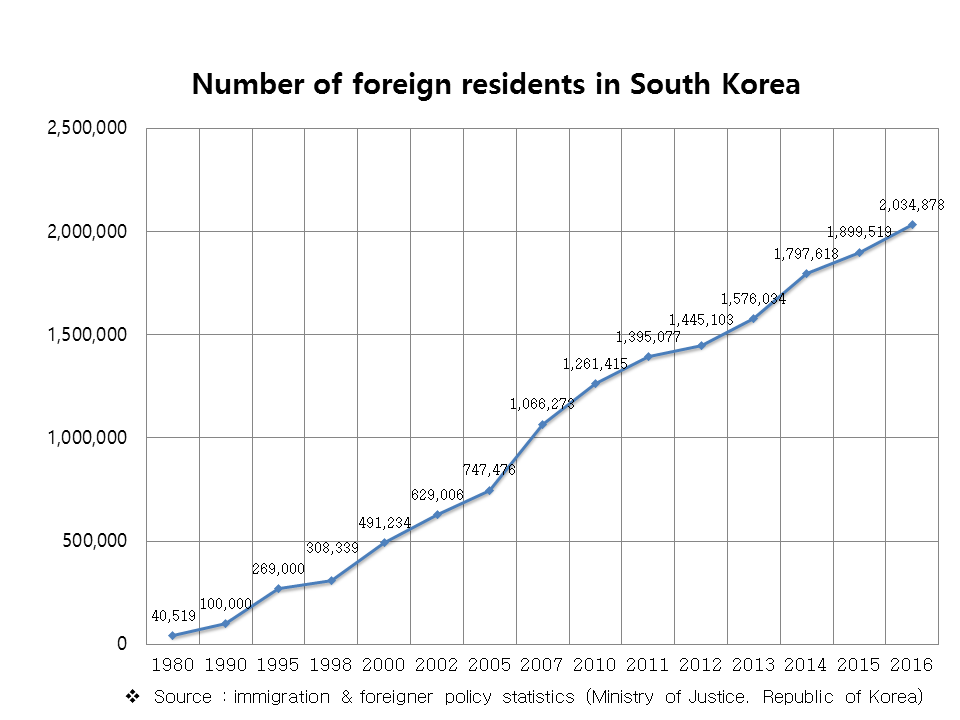
Number of foreign residents in South Korea

The second-biggest group of foreigners in South Korea are migrant workers from Southeast Asia and increasingly from Central Asia (notably Uzbekistan, mostly ethnic Koreans from there, and Mongolians), and in the main cities, particularly Seoul, there is a small but growing number of foreigners related to business and education. The number of expatriate English teachers hailing from English-speaking nations has increased from less than 1,000 in 1988 to over 20,000 in 2002, and stood at more than 22,000 in 2010. There are 28,500 United States military personnel and civilian employees throughout the country.

The number of marriages between Koreans and foreigners has been rising. In 2005, 14% of all marriages in South Korea were marriages to foreigners (about 26,000 marriages); most were rural Korean men marrying other Asian women from poor backgrounds. Many Korean agencies encourage 'international' marriages to Chinese, Vietnamese, Filipina, Indonesian, and Thai women, adding a new degree of complexity to the issue of ethnicity (see mail-order bride).

Percentage of foreigners residing in South Korea by their countries of origin (2016).

== See also ==
- Demographics of South Korea
- Immigration to South Korea
- North Korean defectors
- South Korean defectors
- Multicultural family in South Korea
