= Minorities in South Korea =

Minorities in South Korea have grown since the mid-20th century. South Korea remains one of the world's most ethnically homogeneous nations, i.e. those with majority of the population of one ethnicity, although much less so than North Korea. Since the end of the Korean War in 1953, South Korea has been far more open to foreign influence, especially American.

There were 1,741,919 total foreign residents in Korea in 2015, compared to 1,576,034 in 2013. As of September 2015, according to the Ministry of Government Administration and Home Affairs, the foreign population in South Korea, including migrant workers, increased to 1.8 million, accounting for 3.4% of the total population. in 2022, the percent of foreigners in South Korea has risen to 4.37%, or 2,245,912 people. In 2025, the percent of foreigners in South Korea has risen to 5.3%, or 2,732,797 people. Half of this population was Chinese (958,959), followed by Vietnamese (305,936), Thais (188,770) and Americans (170,251).

== Ethnic minorities ==
=== Chinese ===
The biggest group of foreigners in Korea are the Chinese. In 1970, an estimated 120,000 Chinese resided in South Korea. However, due to economic restrictions by the South Korean government, the number may have fallen to as low as 21,000. In the 10-year period starting in the late 1990s, the number of Chinese in Korea exploded. In the mid-2000s it was estimated that there are at least 300,000 and possibly more than 1,000,000. In 2009 it was estimated there are about 450,000 Chinese Koreans. Chinese citizens living in South Korea as permanent residents or illegal immigrants, including Joseonjok (Korean: 조선족; Hanja: 朝鮮族, Chinese citizens of Korean descent) and Han Chinese. There is a large Chinese community in Seoul's southwestern area (Daerim/Namguro) and a smaller but established a community in Seongnam. Ethnic Chinese in Korea are known as Hwagyo (Korean: 화교; Hanja: 華僑) by the Koreans.

As of 2016, there were 710,000 Chinese nationals living in Korea, of which ethnic Koreans from China accounted for 500,000, Chinese 190,000 and Taiwanese 20,000. Together, they accounted for 51.6 percent of all foreigners in Korea.

=== Other ===
The second-biggest group of foreigners in South Korea are migrant workers from Southeast Asia and increasingly from Central Asia (notably Uzbekistan, mostly ethnic Koreans from there, and Mongolians), and in the main cities, particularly Seoul, there is a small but growing number of foreigners related to business and education. The number of expatriate English teachers hailing from English-speaking nations has increased from less than 1,000 in 1988 to over 20,000 in 2002, and stood at more than 22,000 in 2010. There are 28,500 United States military personnel and civilian employees throughout the country, an increasing number of whom are also accompanied by family members.

== Mixed families ==
The number of marriages between Koreans and foreigners has risen steadily in the past few years. In 2005, 14% of all marriages in South Korea were marriages to foreigners (about 26,000 marriages); most were rural Korean men marrying other Asian women from poor backgrounds. Korean men in age brackets up to their 40s outnumber slightly younger Korean women, both due to a high sex ratio and the drop in the birth rate since the 1960s, leading to a huge demand for wives. Many Korean agencies encourage 'international' marriages to Chinese, Vietnamese, Filipina, Indonesian, and Thai women, adding a new degree of complexity to the issue of ethnicity (see also mail-order bride).

== Influence in entertainment and the arts ==
South Korean media is widely influenced by expatriate entertainers. Performers, often residing with controversial E6 visas provide several assets: a desirable native English language factor - though many are famously bilingual, and contribution to Korea's desire for cultural diversity, image, and English proficiency. English media is available through major broadcasting entities. Though highly unregulated, the expat presence in Korea is encouraged by the prevalence of the Korean wave.

South Korea is home to the headquarters of several major players in gaming and dub-overs. Due to the globalization of popular media, expats are the driving force behind many productions and the competition is described as being harsh due to the popularity of K-dramas. TV personalities such as Bronwyn Mullen and Australian actor Sam Hammington are well known to viewers, often appearing in popular variety shows.

Some performers have reached household name status. Veteran Isaac Durst, an American actor, is well known for his extensive work catering to kids, family friendly TV and radio especially he appeared in Superkids replacing Matthew Readman since the latter episode. Media personalities such as Lisa Kelley, Sam Okyere, Jason Lee, and Richard Kim have been formally recognized for their influence on the Korean media industry. So frequent are their contributions that their voices are considered staples in Korean media, particularly in TV and radio.

On the practical side of entertainment in Asia, the voice industry has become increasingly profitable. Recognized voiceover actors such as American born Jennifer Clyde, who has been dubbed "the voice of Korea in 'English' reach millions through commercials, games and dubbing. Multi-genre performers such as Canadian Jesse Day, Kelly Frances, Stephen Revere, Belgian DJ-actor Julian Quintart, and French performer-model-MC Fabien Yoon contribute through content, voice and live performances. Singer-actress Samia Mounts is credited for her role in Pokémon and American-Korean voice acting, having spent her youth in Korea.

There are several expats working in the South Korean food industry. Joe McPherson first became notable during Anthony Bourdain's visit to Seoul.

Joe McPherson also operates the Dark Side of Seoul ghost walk with Shawn Morrissey. Morrissey is a heritage researcher and folklorist who wrote a comic book based on the Dark Side of Seoul ghost walk..

Korean-American voice actor Dorothy Nam is a popular English language host and radio personality.

The DJ scene is gaining global recognition, and with it, expat professionals. Bellydancing is popular and led by expats such as Australian veteran Belynda Azhaar, PhD., often tying performance to social causes.

As Seoul continues to develop its fashion presence, Expat models are common. Among them, Brazilian veteran Jane Aquino is known as a successful foreign model, posing alongside K-pop idols and working for the likes of high-profile fashion houses such as Hermes. Veteran (former military) designer and model Julian Woodhouse is famous for dominating the fashion scene in Seoul and making his way to prominence in the American fashion industry.

=== Statistics ===
Number of foreign residents in South Korea up to 2024

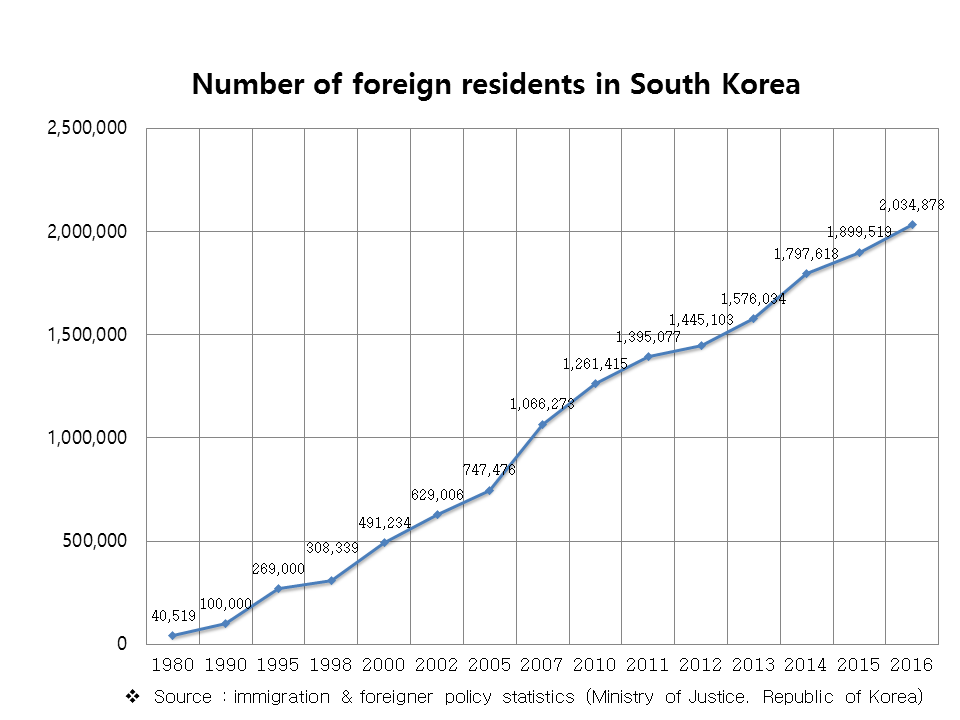
Number of foreign residents in South Korea

Year	Foreign resident population
1980	40,519
1990	100,000
1995	269,000
1998	308,339
2000	491,234
2002	629,006
2005	747,476
2007	1,066,273
2010	1,261,415
2011	1,395,077
2012	1,445,103
2013	1,576,034
2014	1,797,618
2015	1,899,519
2016	2,034,878
2017	2,180,498
2018	2,367,607
2019	2,524,656
2020	2,036,075
2021	1,956,781
2022	2,245,912
2023	2,507,584
2024	2,650,783

Percentage of foreigners residing in South Korea by their countries of origin (2016).

Nationalities of legal foreign residents in South Korea as of 2019.

Country	2024	2021 (Aug.)	2019
China	958,959	851,615	1,101,782
Vietnam	305,936	209,839	224,518
Thailand	188,770	174,052	209,909
United States	170,251	145,724	156,982
Uzbekistan	94,893	66,181	75,320
Nepal	74,641	37,092	42,781
Russia	69,252	48,511	61,427
Philippines	70,392	47,592	62,398
Cambodia	63,681	41,239	47,565
Mongolia	57,093	37,963	48,185
Indonesia	73,180	34,514	48,854
Kazakhstan	44,549	30,389	34,638
Japan	65,216	28,631	86,196
Taiwan	35,838		42,767
Myanmar	53,914		29,294
Canada	28,604		26,789
Sri Lanka	35,792		25,064
Hong Kong	12,786		20,018
Bangladesh	31,220		18,340
Australia	19,430		15,222
Malaysia	12,951		14,790
Pakistan	18,355		13,990
India	16,851		12,929
Others	148,229	104,898	
Total	2,650,783	1,976,000	2,524,656

== See also ==
- Demographics of South Korea
- Immigration to South Korea
- Refugees in South Korea
- Racism in South Korea
