= Koreanization =

Assimilation to Korean culture

Koreanization or Koreanisation is a cultural and language shift whereby populations adopt Korean language or culture. According to David Tizzard, it is "the process of adopting specific traits or behaviors rooted in Korean culture and society."

== Assimilation of Peninsular Japonic speakers ==
Many linguists believe that Peninsular Japonic languages were formerly spoken in central and southern parts of the Korean Peninsula. These languages were used until the Early Three Kingdoms period. After the end of the Three Kingdoms period in 668AD, former place names which included traces of Peninsular Japonic were replaced by the standardized two-character Sino-Korean names assigned under King Gyeongdeok in the 8th century.

== Assimilation of Jurchen ==
Both Goryeo and early Joseon kings fought with and against various groups of Jurchens. Sejong the Great resettled Koreans from southern Korea in his northern border area. Jurchens in Joseon were encouraged to intermarry with Koreans.

== See also ==
- Minorities in Korea
