= Vietnamese people in Korea =

Total population
- 310,000 (estimated 2024)

Regions with significant populations
- Pyongyang, Korea; Busan and Seoul, Korea
- South Korea: 305,936(2024)
- North Korea: 1,000

Languages
- Vietnamese, Korean

Religion
- Vietnamese folk religion, Mahayana Buddhism

Related ethnic groups
- Overseas Vietnamese, Vietnamese people

Vietnamese people in Korea, also known as Vietnamese Koreans, have a history dating back to the 12th century. After the division of Korea and the Korean War, ethnic Vietnamese had various contacts with both North and South Korea. They are Vietnamese expatriates in Korean peninsular or Korean born-citizens were born of partially or full Vietnamese descent. In the latter, Vietnamese are the second-largest group of foreigners, after Chinese migrants.

== Early history ==
One of the earliest ethnic Vietnamese migrated to Korea was Lý Dương Côn (李陽焜), an adopted son of Emperor Lý Nhân Tông; following a succession crisis, he fled to Goryeo. He is known in modern-day Korea as a Vietnamese member of the Jeongseon-gun, Gangwon-do bon-gwan of the Lee family. Later, a Vietnamese prince of the Lý dynasty, Lý Long Tường (the seventh son of emperor Lý Anh Tông) and his crew of several thousand mandarins and servants escaped to Korea via Taiwan after hearing that the Lý dynasty would be overthrown by the Trần dynasty. Lý Long Tường and his crew sought refuge in the Goryeo Kingdom in 1226. Many of them got married with the native people and created their next generation that were born in Korean Peninsula. A report on Lý Long Tường was broadcast by the South Korean TV channel KBS in December 1995.

Legend has it that King Gojong of Goryeo (1213–1259) had dreamt of a grand phoenix flying from the south and landing in his nation. Therefore, he ordered the local government of Haeju, Hwanghae to allow Lý Long Tường and his crew to live in a manor in a nearby countryside. Lý Long Tường became the patriarch of the Lee family of Hwasan, Ongjin-gun after helping stave off the Mongol invasions of the Goryeo Kingdom twice.

== North Korea ==
Students from the Democratic Republic of Vietnam began going to North Korea to study as early as the 1960s, even before the formal establishment of Korean-language education in their country. The current Vietnamese ambassador to South Korea is a graduate of Kim Il-sung University. The son of a former staff member in the Vietnamese embassy in Pyongyang, who also attended Kim Il-sung University between 1998 and 2002, gave an interview in 2004 with South Korean newspaper The Chosun Ilbo about the experiences he had while living there.

== South Korea ==
Vietnamese migration to South Korea began later, but quickly grew to a much larger scale; their population consists mainly of migrant workers, South Koreans citizens that were born there of full or partially Vietnamese origin, and women introduced to local husbands through marriage agencies. In 1994, 20,493 labour migrants went from Vietnam to South Korea on traineeship visas; by 1997, this had risen by about 10% to 22,325. Migrants were mostly male and untrained and were employed in small and medium-sized companies in labour-intensive industries such as fishing and manufacturing. Spousal migration has a longer history: during the Vietnam War, some of the more than 300,000 South Korean soldiers and civilian support staff stationed in Vietnam married Vietnamese women and brought them back to Korea. However, many of these marriages ended in divorce. Spousal migration would not become a large-scale phenomenon until 1990s, when South Korean men, who outnumber South Korean women by about 8%, began to turn to marriage agencies to seek brides in overseas countries, including Vietnam. As of 2006, 5,000 Vietnamese brides immigrate to South Korea every year. A 2007 article reported that Korean men married to Vietnamese women typically meet on marriage tours, which are sometimes subsidized by rural governments keen on increasing birthrates in the Korean countryside. These subsidies are given only after a while when couples settle down in Korea. There are still problems to this day in regards to humans rights in these particular marriages.

== Vietnam War ==
South Korea supported South Vietnam whilst North Korea supported North Vietnam during the Vietnam War. South Korea even sent troops to support the South Vietnamese front against North Vietnam, yet Vietnam and South Korea to this day maintain very positive ties.

== See also ==
- Immigration to North Korea
- Immigration to South Korea
- Koreans in Vietnam
- Lai Đại Hàn
- North Korea–Vietnam relations
- South Korea–Vietnam relations
- Minorities in North Korea
- Minorities in South Korea
