= Demographics of South Korea =

- Population pyramid of South Korea
- Population: 52,081,799 (2024 est.)
- Growth rate: 0.21% (2024 est.)
- Birth rate: 7 births/1,000 population (2024 est.)
- Death rate: 7.4 deaths/1,000 population (2024 est.)
- Life expectancy: 83.4 years
  - male: 80.3 years
  - female: 86.6 years (2024 est.)
- Fertility rate: 0.75 children born/woman (2024)
- Infant mortality: 2.8 deaths/1,000 live births (2024 est.)
- Net migration rate: 2.6 migrant(s)/1,000 population (2024 est.)
- Immigrant share: 3.5% (2024)

Age structure
- 0–14 years: ▼10.2% (2025 est.)
- 15–64 years: ▼69.5% (2025 est.)
- 65 and over: ▲20.3% (2025 est.)

Sex ratio
- Total: 1.01 male(s)/female (2024 est.)
- At birth: 1.05 male(s)/female
- Under 15: 1.05 male(s)/female
- 65 and over: 0.79 male(s)/female

Nationality
- Nationality: South Korean
- Major ethnic: Koreans
- Minor ethnic: Chinese, Vietnamese, Filipinos, Indonesians, Thais, Uzbeks others

Language
- Spoken: Korean

Demographic features of South Korea's population include population density, ethnicity, education level, health, economic status, religious affiliations, and other aspects of the population. The common language and especially culture are widely considered more important elements by South Koreans in terms of identity than citizenship.

In 2012, South Korea's population surpassed 50 million citizens for the first time in history, and by the end of 2021, the country's population had peaked at approximately 51.77 million people. However, in recent years the total fertility rate (TFR) of South Korea has stayed below the replacement requirement of 2.1, leading some researchers to suggest that if current trends continue, the country's population will shrink to approximately 28 million people by the end of the 21st century. In 2018, fertility in South Korea became a topic of international debate after only 26,500 babies were born in October and an estimated 325,000 babies for the year, causing the country to achieve the lowest birth rate in the world. In a further indication of South Korea's dramatic decline in fertility, in 2020 the country recorded more deaths than births, resulting in a population decline for the first time since modern records began. In 2026, South Korea had the lowest birthrate in the world.

South Korea's population decline has been a direct result of record-low birth rates, which have been, according to many experts and researchers, a consequence of the country's high economic inequality, relatively high costs of living, low wages for an OECD member country, lack of job opportunities for young adults, and rising housing costs. Additionally, South Korea is also the country with the highest suicide rate among OECD member states and the wider developed world.

In South Korea, a variety of different Asian people had migrated to the Korean Peninsula in past centuries; however, few have remained permanently. South Korea is a highly homogenous nation, but has in recent decades become home to a number of foreign residents (5.44%), whereas North Korea has not experienced this trend. However, many of them are ethnic Koreans with foreign citizenship. Many residents from China, post-Soviet states, the United States, and Japan are, in fact, repatriated ethnic Koreans (labeled "Overseas Koreans") who may meet criteria for expedited acquisition of South Korean citizenship. For example, migrants from the People's Republic of China (PRC) make up 35.23% of foreign nationals; however, approximately 70% of the Chinese citizens in Korea are Joseonjok (조선족), PRC citizens of Korean ethnicity.

== Population trends ==
Historical population
Year	Pop.	±%
1930	13,900,805	—
1940	15,627,186	+12.4%
1949	20,166,756	+29.0%
1960	24,989,241	+23.9%
1970	30,882,386	+23.6%
1980	37,436,315	+21.2%
1990	43,410,899	+16.0%
2000	46,136,101	+6.3%
2010	48,580,293	+5.3%
2020	51,829,136	+6.7%
2025	51,817,499	−0.0%

Population of the Korean Peninsula 1910–2016

The population of South Korea showed robust growth since the republic's establishment in 1948, and then dramatically slowed down with the effects of its economic growth. In the first official census, taken in 1949, the total population of South Korea was calculated at 20,188,641 people. The 1985 census total was 40,466,577. Population growth was slow, averaging about 1.1% annually during the period from 1949 to 1955, when the population registered at 21.5 million. Growth accelerated between 1955 and 1966 to 29.2 million or an annual average of 2.8%, but declined significantly during the period 1966 to 1985 to an annual average of 1.7%. Thereafter, the annual average growth rate was estimated to be less than 1%, similar to the low growth rates of most industrialized countries and to the target figure set by the Ministry of Health and Social Affairs for the 1990s. As of January 1, 1989, the population of South Korea was estimated to be approximately 42,200,000.

The proportion of the total population under fifteen years of age has risen and fallen with the growth rate. In 1955, approximately 41.2% of the population was under fifteen years of age, a percentage that rose to 43.5% in 1966 before falling to 38.3% in 1975, 34.2% in 1980, and 29.9% in 1985. In the past, the large proportion of children relative to the total population put great strains on the country's economy, particularly because substantial resources were invested in education facilities. With the slowdown in the population growth rate and a rise in the median age (from 18.7 years to 21.8 years between 1960 and 1980), the age structure of the population has begun to resemble the columnar pattern typical of developed countries, rather than the pyramidal pattern found in most parts of the Third World.

The decline in the population growth rate and in the proportion of people under fifteen years of age after 1966 reflected the success of official and unofficial birth control programs. The government of President Syngman Rhee (1948–60) was conservative in such matters. Although Christian churches initiated a family planning campaign in 1957, it was not until 1962 that the government of Park Chung Hee, alarmed at the way in which the rapidly increasing population was undermining economic growth, began a nationwide family planning program. Other factors that contributed to a slowdown in population growth included urbanization, later marriage ages for both men and women, higher education levels, a greater number of women in the labor force, and better health standards.

Public and private agencies involved in family planning included the Ministry of Health and Social Affairs, the Ministry of Home Affairs, the Planned Parenthood Federation of Korea, and the Korea Institute of Family Planning. In the late 1980s, their activities included the distribution of free birth control devices and information, classes for women on family planning methods, and the granting of special subsidies and privileges (such as low-interest housing loans) to parents who agreed to undergo sterilization. There were 502,000 South Koreans sterilized in 1984, as compared with 426,000 in the previous year.

The 1973 Maternal and Child Health Law legalized abortion. In 1983, the government began suspending medical insurance benefits for maternal care for pregnant women with three or more children. It also denied tax deductions for education expenses to parents with two or more children.

As in China, cultural attitudes posed problems for family planning programs. A strong preference for sons—who in Korea's traditional Confucian value system are expected to care for their parents in old age and carry on the family name—means that parents with only daughters usually continued to have children until a son is born. The government encouraged married couples to have only one child. This has been a prominent theme in public service advertising, which stresses "have a single child and raise it well."

Total fertility rates (the average number of births a woman will have during her lifetime) fell from 6.1 births per female in 1960 to 4.2 in 1970, 2.8 in 1980, and 2.4 in 1984. The number of live births, recorded as 711,810 in 1978, grew to a high of 917,860 in 1982. This development stirred apprehensions among family planning experts of a new "baby boom." By 1986, however, the number of live births had declined to 806,041.

Decline in population growth continued, and between 2005 and 2010 total fertility rate for South Korean women was 1.21, one of the world's lowest according to the United Nations. Fertility rate well below the replacement level of 2.1 births per female has triggered a national alarm, with some predicting an aging society unable to grow or support its elderly. Recent Korean governments have prioritized the issue on their agenda, promising to enact social reforms that will encourage women to have children.

The country's population increased to 46 million by the end of the twentieth century, with growth rates ranging between 0.9% and 1.2%. An early 1992 estimate had projected that the population would stabilize around 2023 at about 52.6 million people. Subsequent projections released by Statistics Korea in December 2023 found that the total population reached 51.67 million in 2022 and, after a brief peak of roughly 51.75 million in 2024, is expected to decline rather than stabilize, falling to 50.06 million by 2040 and to 36.22 million by 2072. In the words of Asiaweek magazine, the "stabilized tally will approximate the number of Filipinos in 1983, but squeezed into less than a third of their [the Philippines'] space."

As of early 2019, the birth rate of South Korea reached an alarmingly low number. In February 2019, the Korean TFR fell to 0.98, well below the replacement level of 2.1 births. South Korea is now the fastest-aging developed country in the world. The Korean government (and its failing actions against the birth rate issue) and the worsening economic environment for young people are blamed as the main causes.

View source data.
View source data.
View source data.
View source data.

=== Population settlement patterns ===
South Korea is one of the world's most densely populated countries, with an estimated 425 people per square kilometer in 1989—over sixteen times the average population density of the United States in the late 1980s. By comparison, China had an estimated 114 people, the Federal Republic of Germany (West Germany) 246 people, and Japan 323 people per square kilometer in the late 1980s. Because about 70% of South Korea's land area is mountainous and the population is concentrated in the lowland areas, actual population densities were in general greater than the average. As early as 1975, it was estimated that the density of South Korea's thirty-five cities, each of which had a population of 50,000 or more inhabitants, was 3,700 people per square kilometer. Because of continued migration to urban areas, the figure was higher in the late 1980s.

In 1988 Seoul had a population density of 17,030 people per square kilometer as compared with 13,816 people per square kilometer in 1980. The second largest city, Busan, had a density of 8,504 people per square kilometer in 1988 as compared with 7,272 people in 1980. Gyeonggi Province, which surrounds the capital and contains Incheon, the country's fourth largest city, was the most densely populated province; Gangwon Province in the northeast was the least densely populated province.

According to the government's Economic Planning Board, the population density will be 530 people per square kilometer by 2023, the year the population is expected to stabilize.

Rural areas in South Korea consist of agglomerated villages in river valleys and range from a few houses to several hundred. These villages are located in the south that are backed by hills and give strong protection from winter winds.

Since 1960, the pace of urbanization in South Korea has hit a considerable decline in population of rural areas and the traditional rural lifestyle has been slowly fading away.

=== Fertility ===
Population, fertility rate, and net reproduction rate, United Nations estimates

Over the past 20 years, South Korea has recorded some of the lowest fertility and marriage levels in the world. As of 2024, it is the country with the world's lowest total fertility rate (TFR), standing at 0.75. Additionally, the country's capital, Seoul, registered a TFR of 0.64, which was likely the lowest level anywhere in the world. entering pediatrics out of the fear that the field has no future. Due to how medical insurance is structured in South Korea, pediatric care relies especially on volume to compensate for its low reimbursement rates. The number of pediatric facilities in Seoul fell by 12.5 percent between 2018 and 2022, compared to an increase of 76.8 percent for psychiatry clinics and a 41.2 percent rise for anesthesiology centers. Conditions such as overcrowded waiting rooms and a shortage of hospital beds have led to the death of at least one child. The difficulty in obtaining pediatric care is causing many South Korean couples to reconsider having babies.

=== Age structure ===
Population of South Korea by age and sex (demographic pyramid)

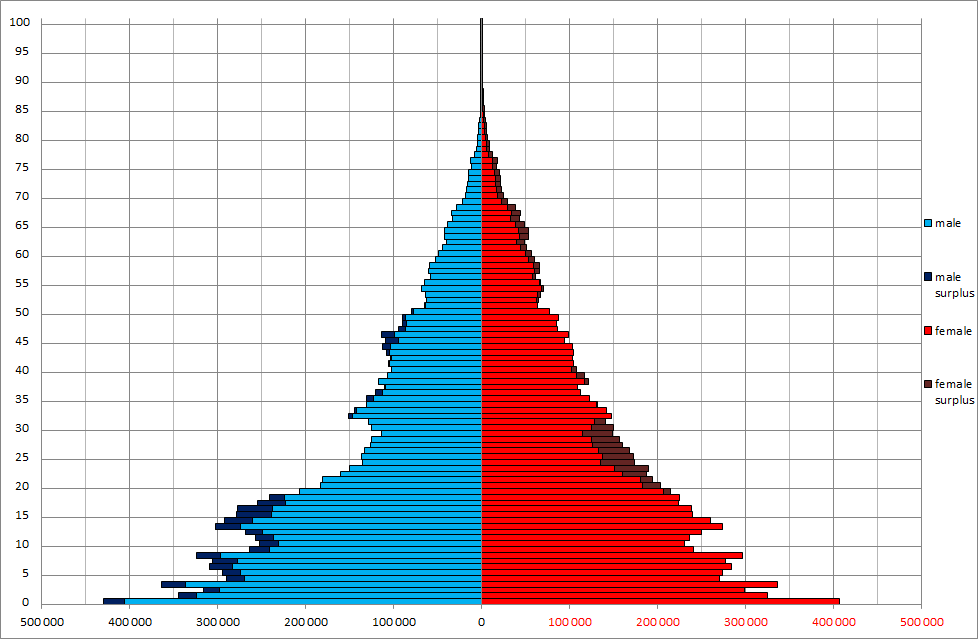
as on 1955-09-01

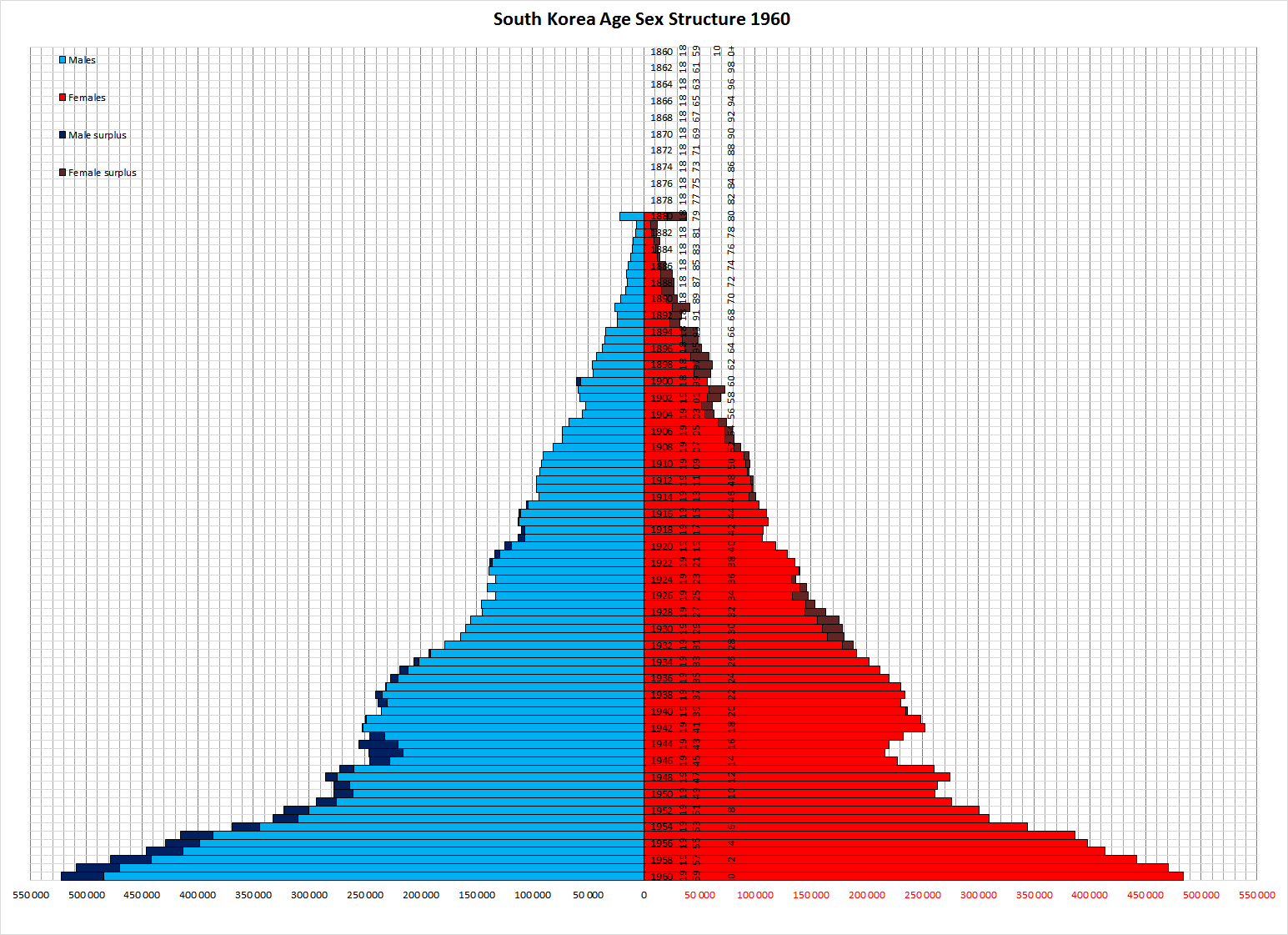
as on 1960-11-01

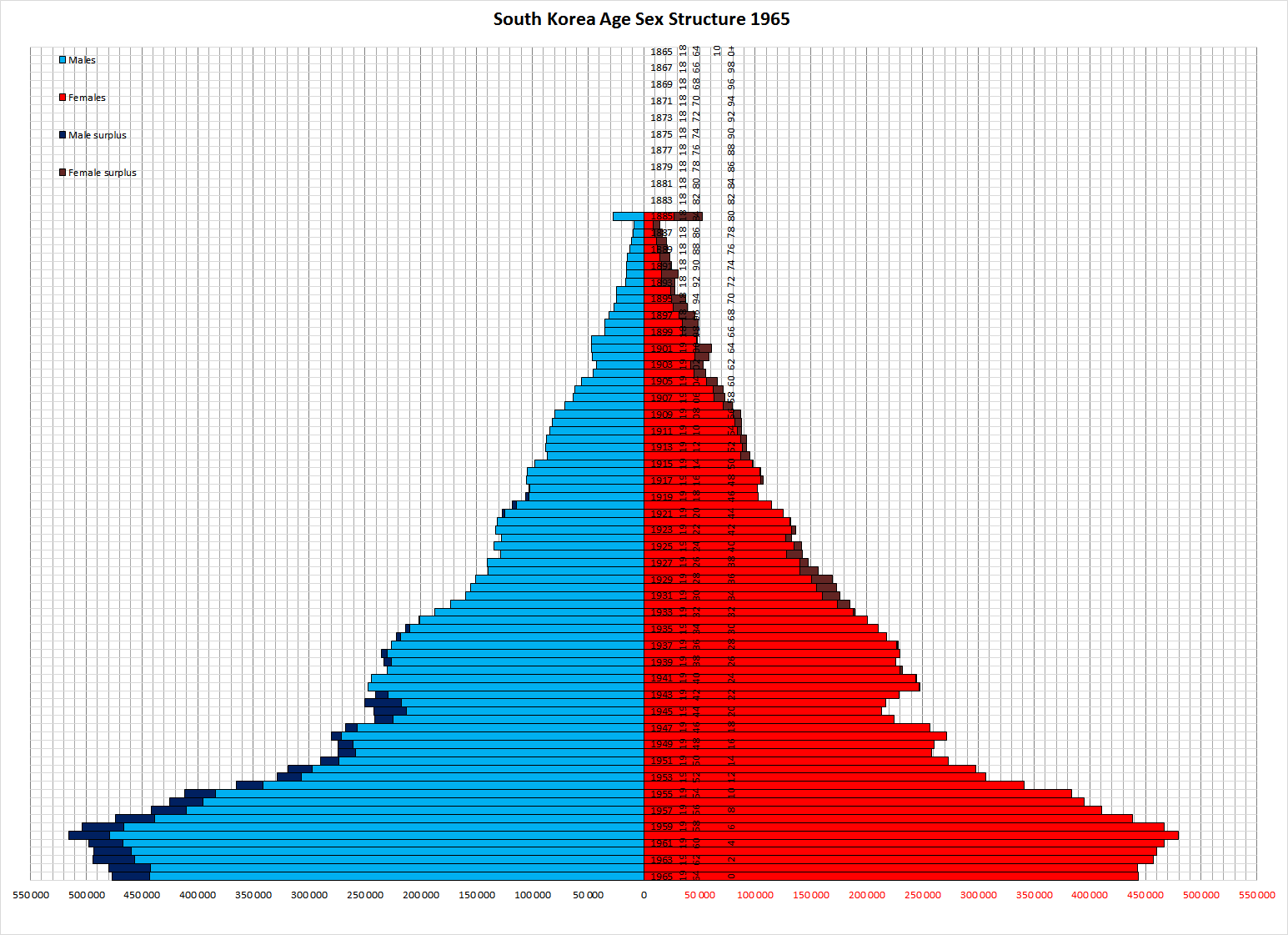
as on 1965-11-01

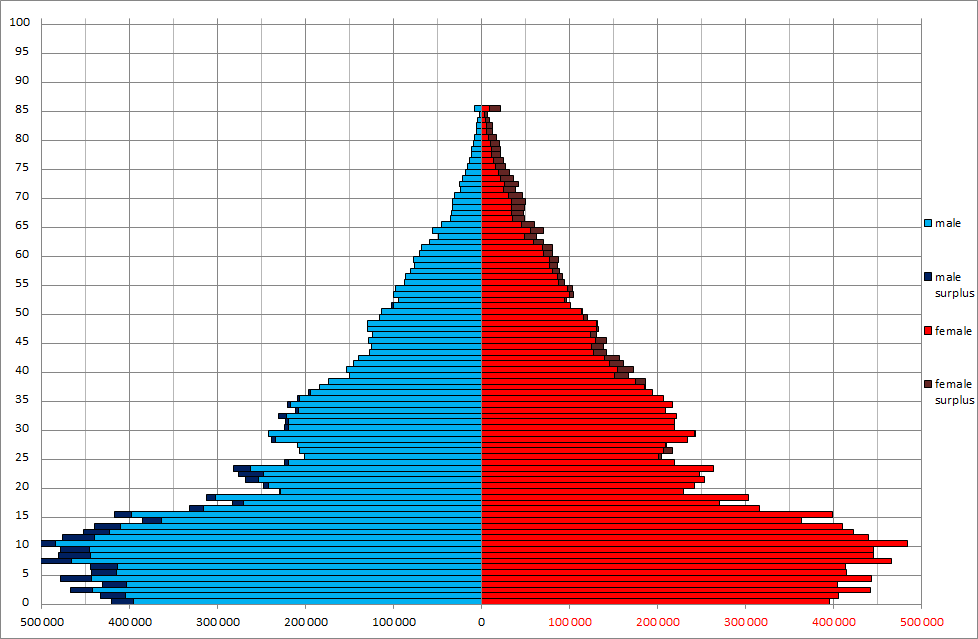
as on 1970-10-01

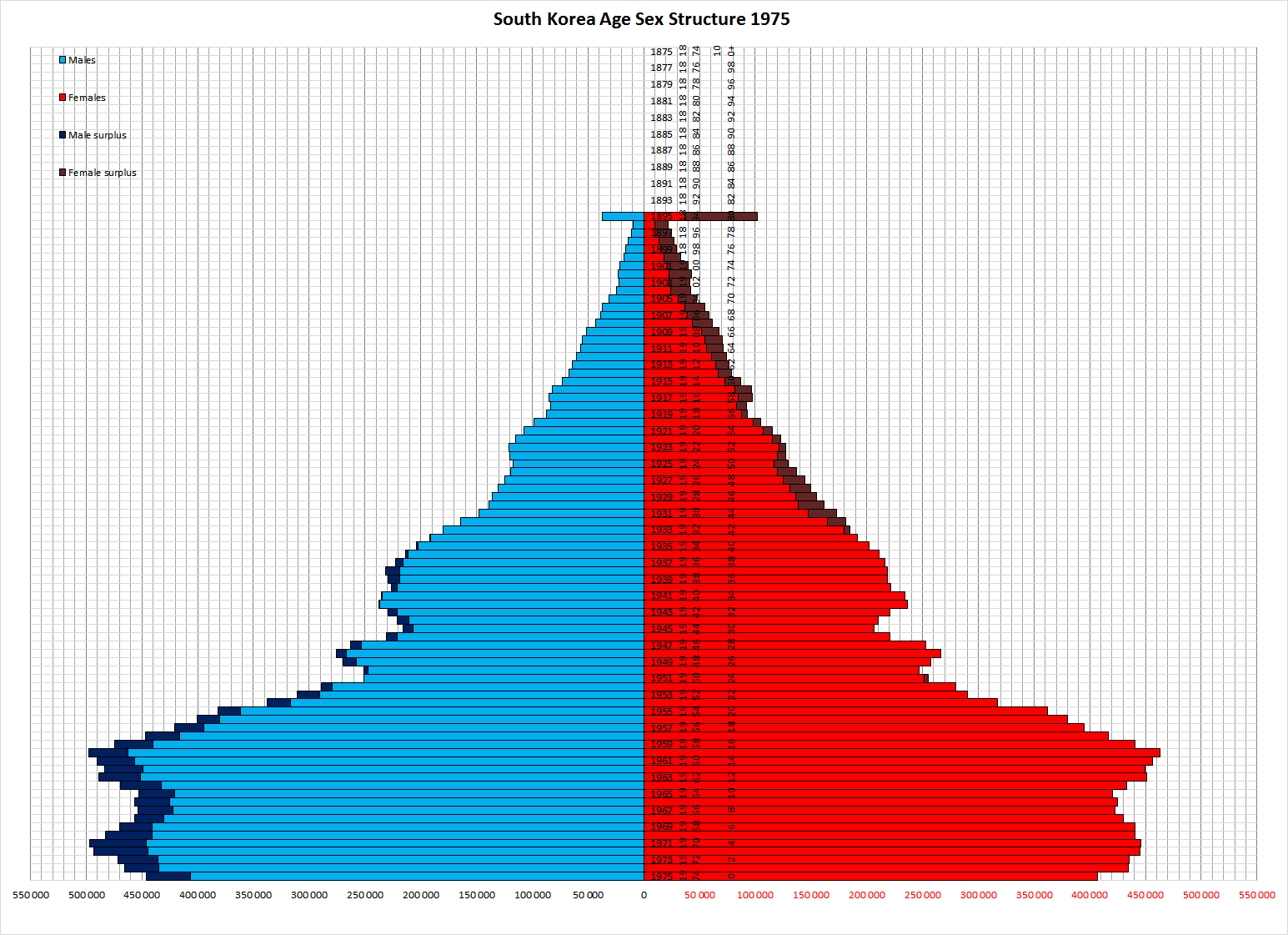
as on 1975-11-01

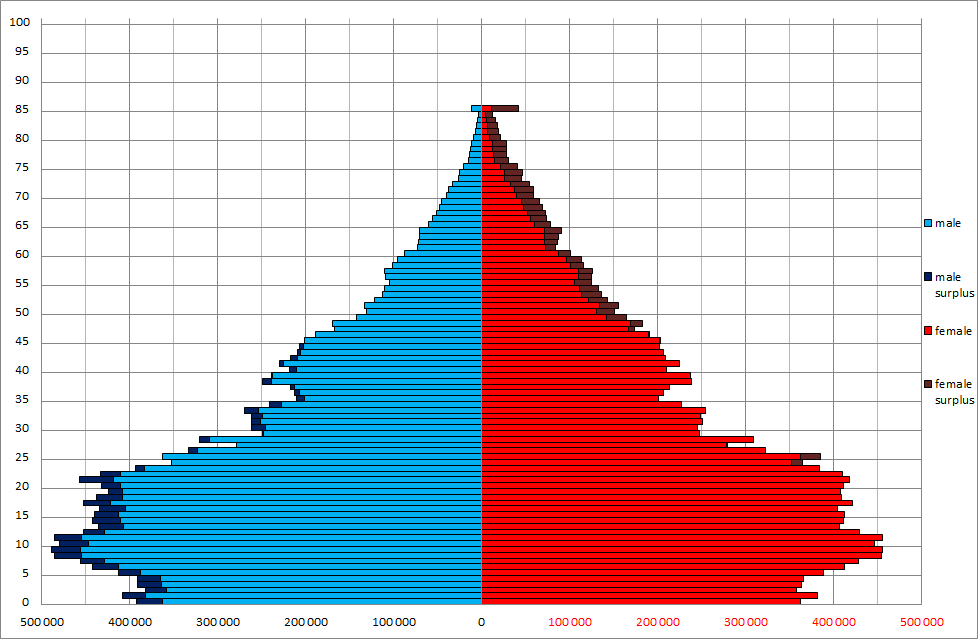
as on 1980-11-01

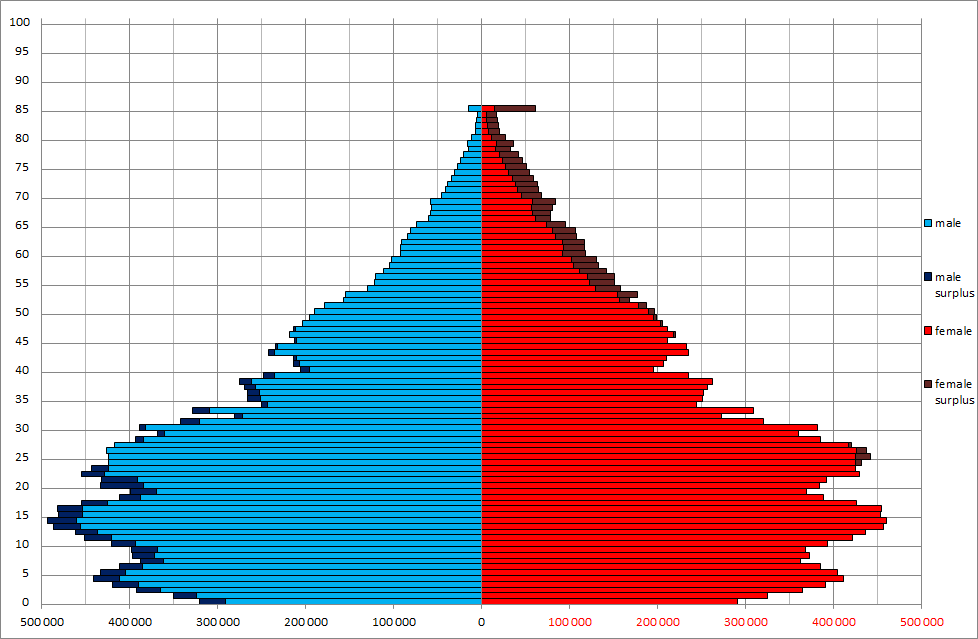
as on 1985-11-01

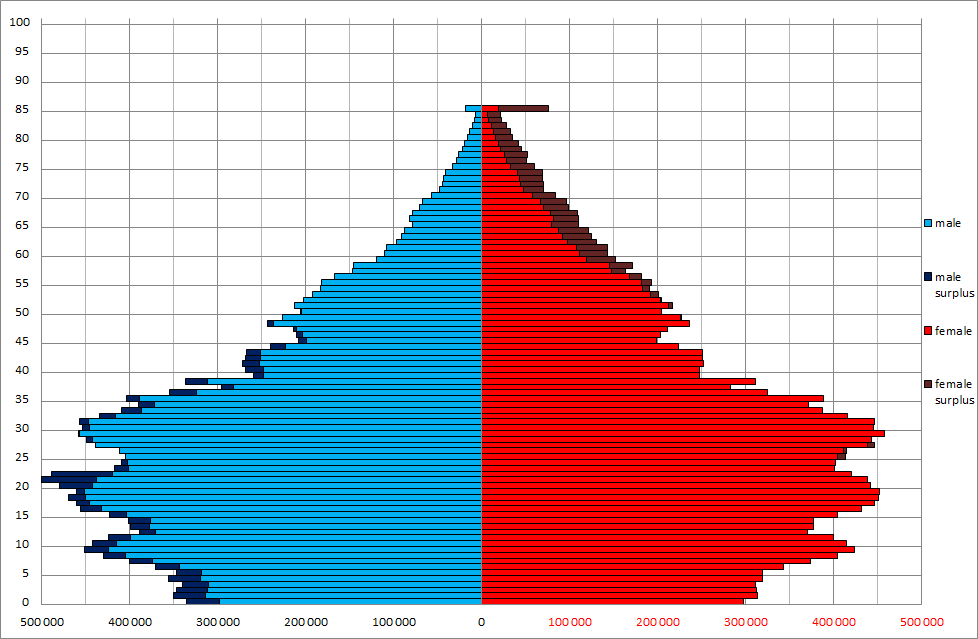
as on 1990-11-01

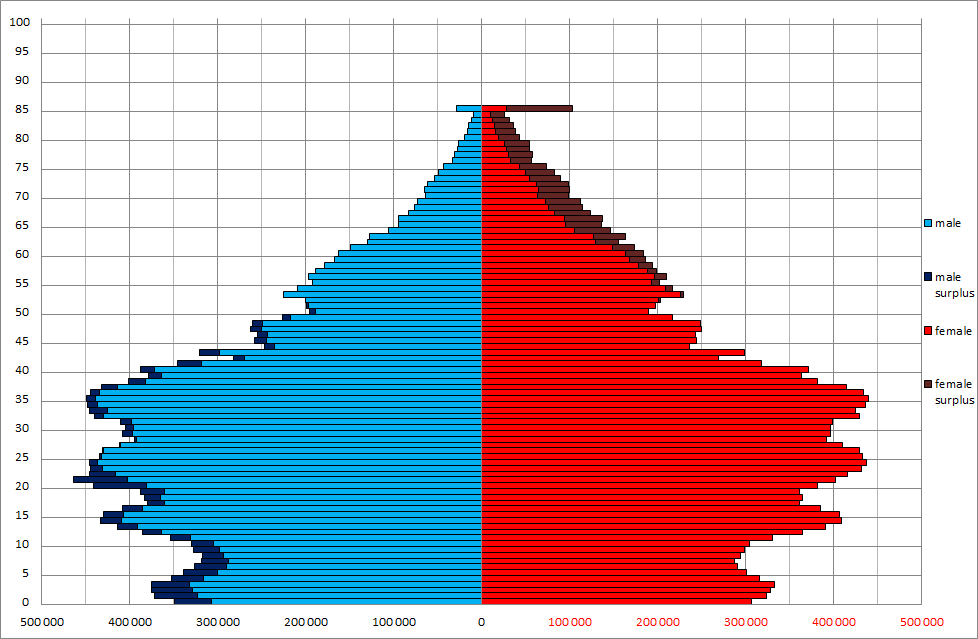
as on 1995-11-01

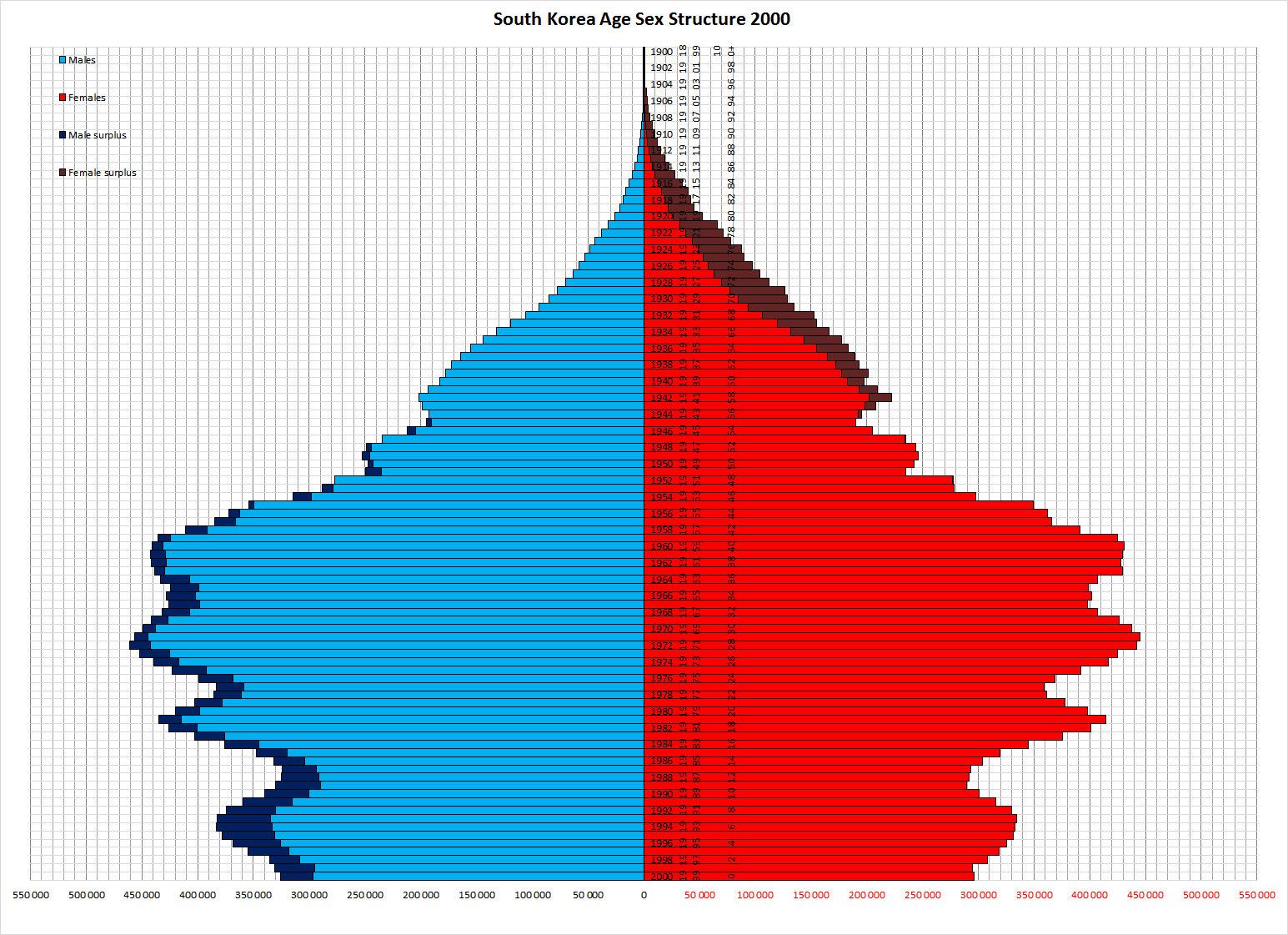
as on 2000-11-01

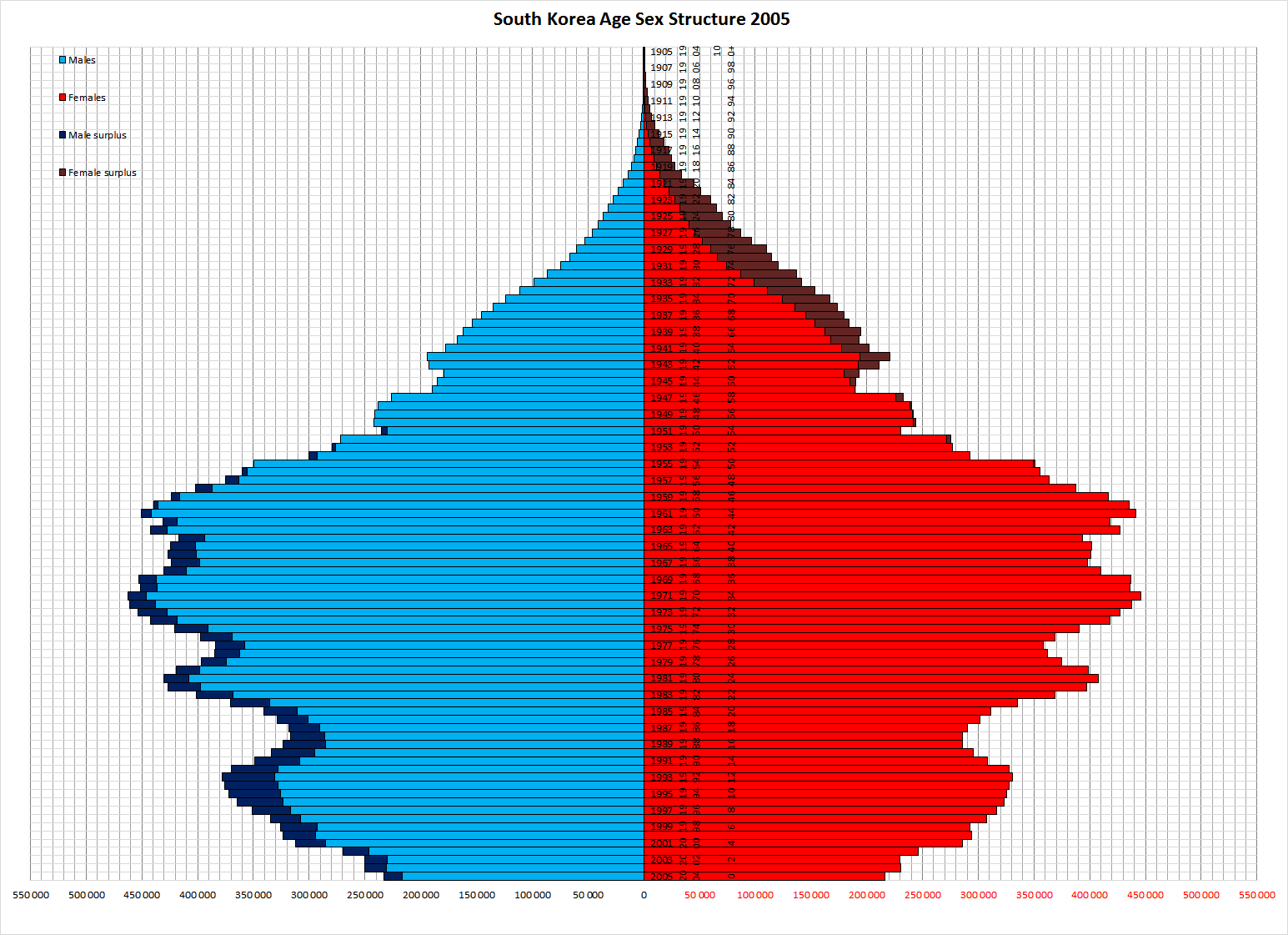
as on 2005-11-01

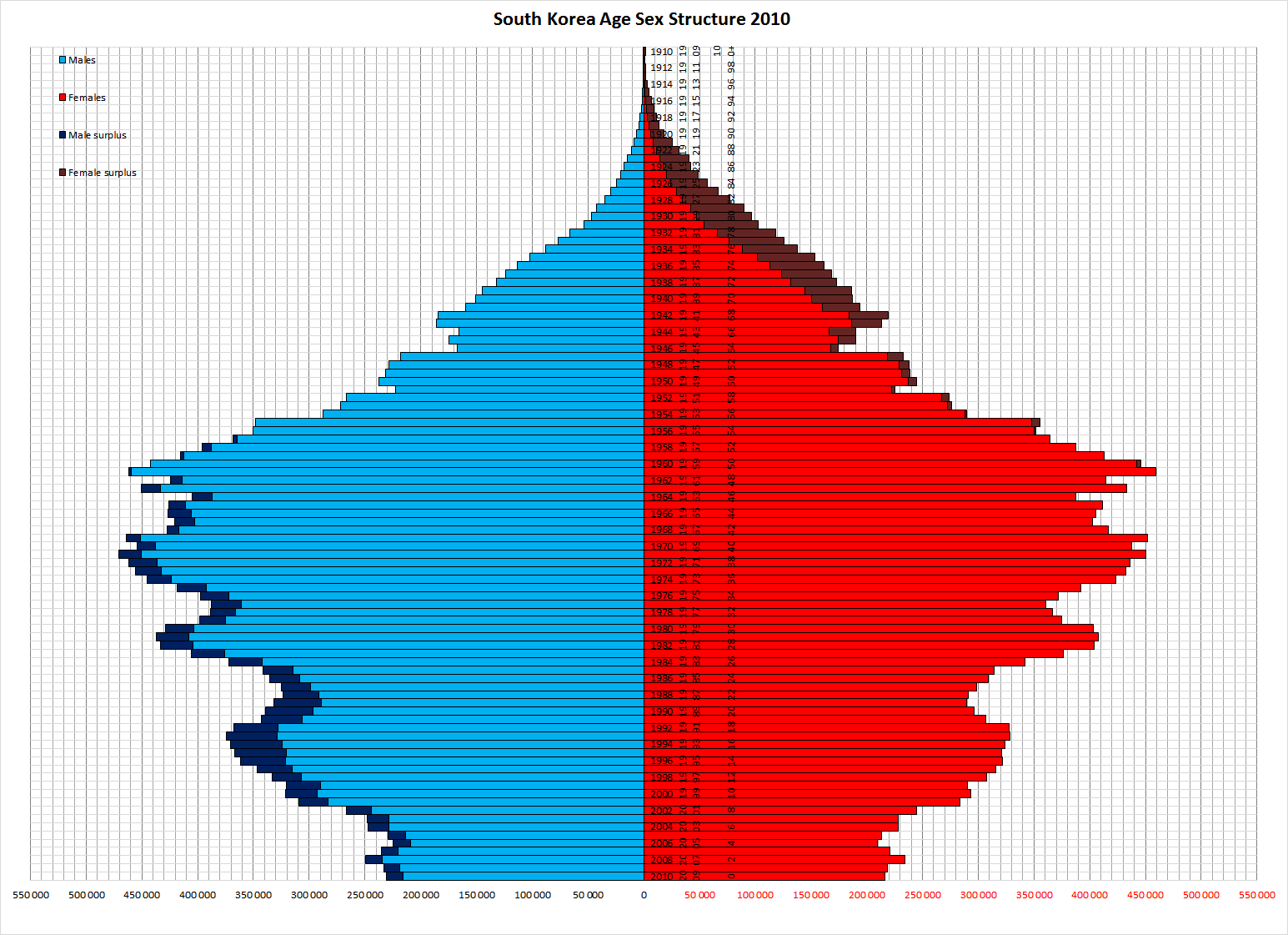
as on 2010-11-01

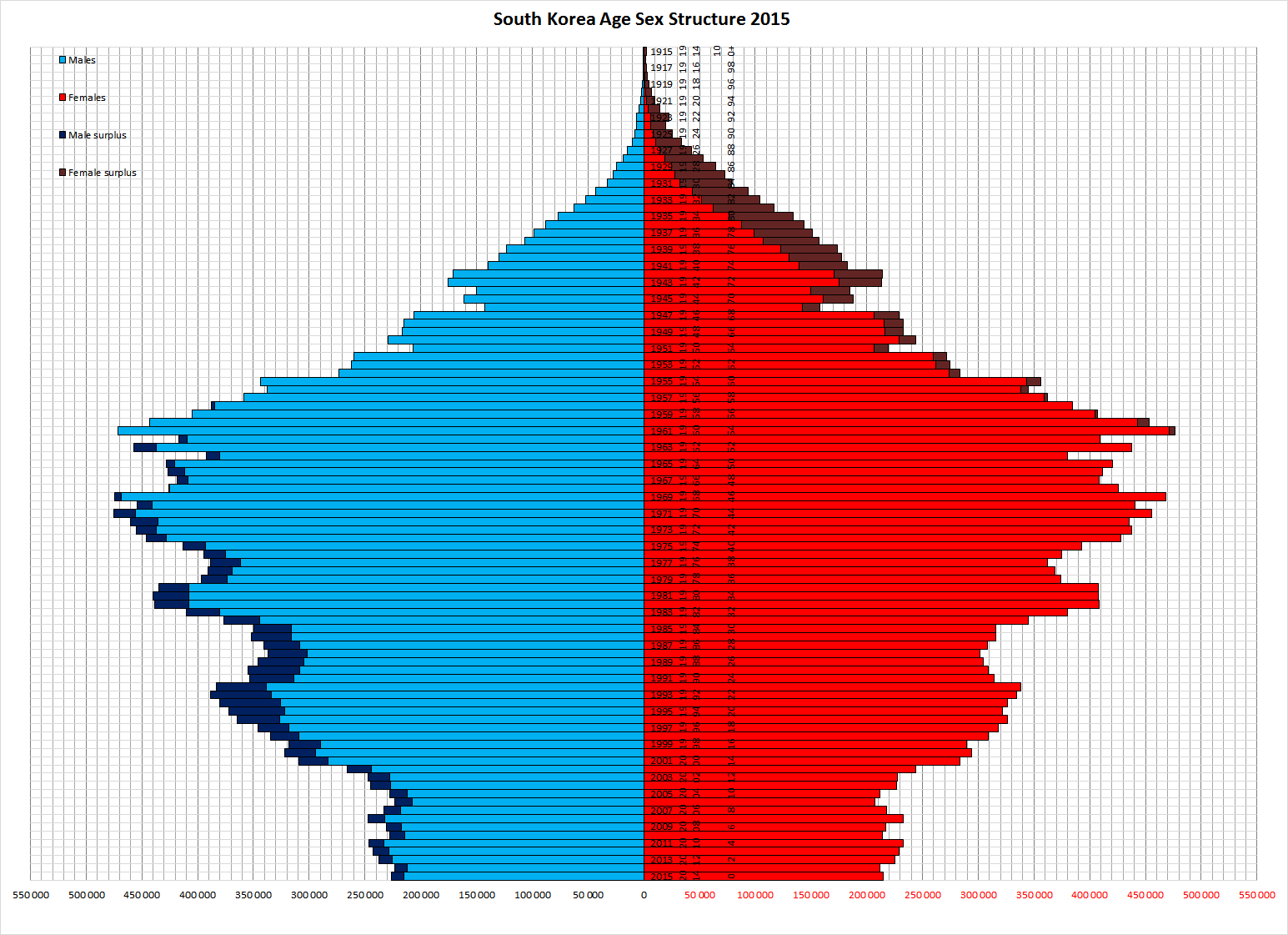
as on 2015-11-01
Population by Sex and Age Group (Census 01.XI.2015):

Age group	Male	Female	Total	%
Total	25 608 502	25 460 873	51 069 375	100%
0–4	1 159 011	1 099 659	2 258 670	4.42%
5–9	1 169 770	1 098 081	2 267 851	4.44%
10–14	1 262 770	1 165 022	2 427 792	4.75%
15–19	1 668 683	1 525 396	3 194 079	6.25%
20–24	1 887 776	1 643 332	3 531 108	6.91%
25–29	1 728 888	1 536 400	3 265 288	6.39%
30–34	1 986 796	1 824 814	3 811 610	7.46%
35–39	2 022 466	1 904 396	3 926 862	7.69%
40–44	2 218 442	2 120 385	4 338 827	8.50%
45–49	2 217 013	2 171 144	4 388 157	8.59%
50–54	2 153 186	2 110 261	4 263 447	8.35%
55–59	1 969 232	1 987 617	3 956 849	7.75%
60–64	1 379 694	1 441 763	2 821 457	5.52%
65–69	1 028 129	1 115 894	2 144 023	4.20%
70–74	793 855	976 886	1 770 741	3.47%
75–79	553 178	809 491	1 362 669	2.67%
80–84	276 627	537 595	814 222	1.59%
85–89	98 855	274 132	372 987	0.73%
90–94	28 759	95 964	124 723	0.24%
95–99	4 923	19 873	24 796	0.05%
100+	449	2 768	3 217	0.01%
Age group	Male	Female	Total	Percent
0–14	3 591 551	3 362 762	6 954 313	13.62%
15–64	19 232 176	18 265 508	37 497 684	73.42%
65+	2 784 775	3 832 603	6 617 378	12.96%

Population Estimates by Sex and Age Group (01.VII.2018) (Data refer to national projections.):

Age group	Male	Female	Total	%
Total	25 863 502	25 743 131	51 606 633	100%
0–4	1 041 546	990 466	2 032 012	3.94%
5–9	1 177 422	1 112 213	2 289 635	4.44%
10–14	1 172 820	1 094 921	2 267 741	4.39%
15–19	1 469 053	1 348 192	2 817 245	5.46%
20–24	1 856 658	1 639 906	3 496 564	6.78%
25–29	1 868 308	1 629 072	3 497 380	6.78%
30–34	1 766 587	1 599 914	3 366 501	6.52%
35–39	2 116 733	1 983 849	4 100 582	7.95%
40–44	2 023 646	1 932 121	3 955 767	7.67%
45–49	2 311 564	2 245 193	4 556 757	8.83%
50–54	2 076 615	2 046 927	4 123 542	7.99%
55–59	2 163 953	2 175 966	4 339 919	8.41%
60–64	1 669 024	1 721 804	3 390 828	6.57%
65–69	1 133 201	1 225 188	2 358 389	4.57%
70–74	826 425	969 862	1 796 287	3.48%
75–79	664 618	915 752	1 580 370	3.06%
80–84	355 962	632 408	988 370	1.92%
85–89	128 560	330 914	459 474	0.89%
90–94	32 990	115 467	148 457	0.29%
95–99	7 260	29 581	36 841	0.07%
100+	557	3 415	3 972	0.01%
Age group	Male	Female	Total	Percent
0–14	3 391 788	3 197 600	6 589 388	12.77%
15–64	19 322 141	18 322 944	37 645 085	72.95%
65+	3 149 573	4 222 587	7 372 160	14.29%

Population by Sex and Age Group (Census 01.XI.2020) (Data include both Koreans and foreigners. De jure residence refers to expected length of stay of more than three months.):

Age group	Male	Female	Total	%
Total	25 915 207	25 913 929	51 829 136	100%
0–4	883 196	838 885	1 722 081	3.32%
5–9	1 161 247	1 103 348	2 264 595	4.37%
10–14	1 168 937	1 098 544	2 267 481	4.37%
15–19	1 271 404	1 178 157	2 449 561	4.83%
20–24	1 762 135	1 602 669	3 364 804	6.49%
25–29	1 959 723	1 706 489	3 666 212	7.07%
30–34	1 742 483	1 558 848	3 301 331	6.37%
35–39	1 970 249	1 835 221	3 805 470	7.34%
40–44	1 997 630	1 909 035	3 906 665	7.54%
45–49	2 196 042	2 129 655	4 325 697	8.35%
50–54	2 195 060	2 176 994	4 372 054	8.44%
55–59	2 109 380	2 101 265	4 210 645	8.12%
60–64	1 912 792	1 972 505	3 885 297	7.50%
65–69	1 314 575	1 419 612	2 734 187	5.28%
70–74	946 539	1 081 140	2 027 679	3.91%
75–79	684 291	916 576	1 600 867	3.09%
80–84	419 037	701 744	1 120 781	2.16%
85–89	168 643	395 287	563 930	1.09%
90–94	42 951	149 712	192 663	0.37%
95–99	8 024	33 488	41 512	0.08%
100+	869	4 755	5 624	0.01%
Age group	Male	Female	Total	Percent
0–14	3 213 380	3 040 777	6 254 157	12.07%
15–64	19 116 898	18 170 838	37 287 736	71.94%
65+	3 584 929	4 702 314	8 287 243	15.99%

View source data.
View source data.

South Korea faces the issue of a rapidly aging population. In fact, the speed of aging in Korea is unprecedented in human history, 18 years to double aging population from 7–14% (fewest years), overtaking even Japan. Statistics support this observation; the percentage of elderly aged 65 and above, has sharply risen from 3.3% in 1955 to 10.7% in 2009. The shape of its population has changed from a pyramid in the 1990s, with more young people and fewer old people, to a diamond shape in 2010, with fewer young people and a large proportion of middle-aged individuals.

South Korea population pyramid 1960–2020

There are several implications and issues associated with an aging population. A rapidly aging population is likely to have several negative implications on the labour force. In particular, experts predict that this might lead to a shrinking of the labour force. As an increasing proportion of people enter their 50s and 60s, they either choose to retire or are forced to retire by their companies. As such, there would be a decrease in the percentage of economically active people in the population. Also, with rapid aging, it is highly likely that there would be an imbalance in the young-old percentage of the workforce. This might lead to a lack of vibrancy and innovation in the labour force, since it is helmed mainly by the middle-aged workers. Data shows that while there are fewer young people in society, the percentage of the economically active population, made up of people ages 15–64, has increased by 20% from 55.5% to 72.5%. This shows that the labour force is indeed largely made up of middle-aged workers.

A possible consequence might be that South Korea would be a less attractive candidate for investment. Investors might decide to relocate to countries like Vietnam, where there is an abundance of cheaper, younger labour. If employers were to choose to maintain operations in South Korea, there is a possibility that they might incur higher costs in retraining or upgrading the skills of this group of middle-age workers. On top of that, higher healthcare costs might also be incurred and the government would need to set aside more money to maintain a good healthcare system to cater to the elderly.

Due to the very low birth rate, South Korea is predicted to enter a Russian Cross pattern once the large generation born in the 1960s starts to die off, with potentially decades of population decline.

Since 2016, the number of elderly people (aged 65 and older) has outnumbered children (0–14 years) and the country has become an "aged society." As of 2026, 21.6% of the population in South Korea is over the age of 65.

=== Urbanization ===
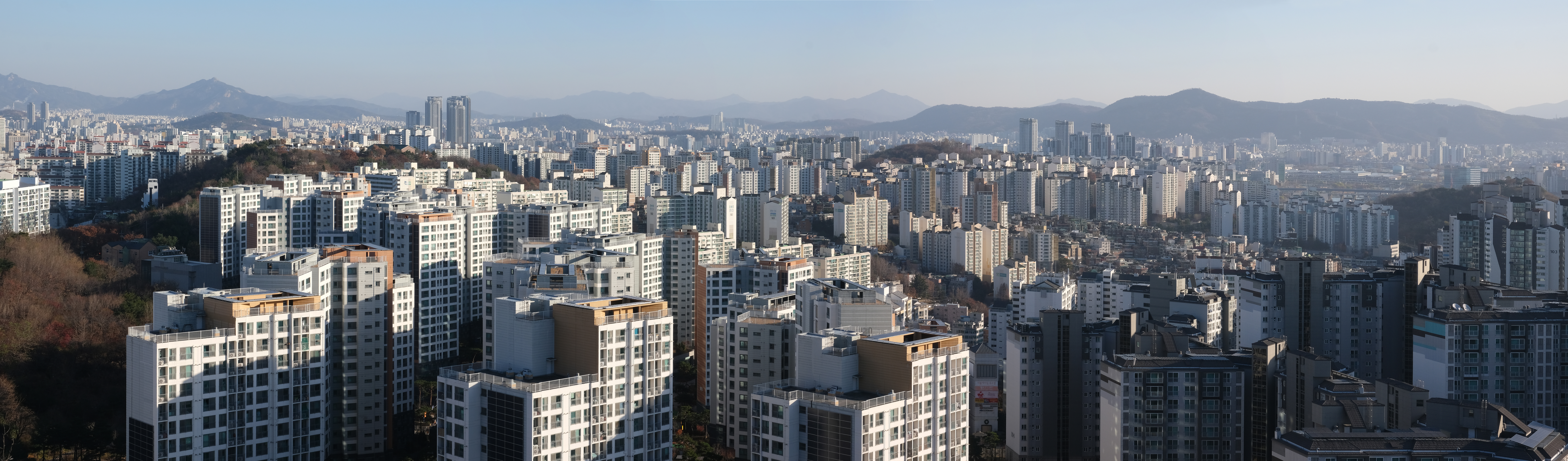
Urban housing in Seongdong District, seen from the Mountain, Seoul

Like other newly industrializing economies, South Korea experienced rapid growth of urban areas caused by the migration of large numbers of people from the countryside. In the eighteenth and nineteenth centuries, Seoul, by far the largest urban settlement, had a population of about 190,000 people. There was a striking contrast with Japan, where Edo (Tokyo) had as many as 1 million inhabitants and the urban population comprised as much as 10% to 15% of the total during the Tokugawa Period (1600–1868). During the closing years of the Joseon period and the first years of Japanese colonial rule, the urban population of Korea was no more than 3% of the total. After 1930, when the Japanese began industrial development on the Korean Peninsula, particularly in the northern provinces adjacent to Manchuria, the urban portion of the population began to grow, reaching 11.6% for all of Korea in 1940.

Between 1945 and 1985, the urban population of South Korea grew from 14.5% to 65.4% of the total population. In 1988, the Economic Planning Board estimated that the urban portion of the population would reach 78.3% by the end of the twentieth century. Most of this urban increase was attributable to migration rather than to natural growth of the urban population. Urban birth rates have generally been lower than the national average. The extent of urbanization in South Korea, however, is not fully revealed in these statistics. Urban population was defined in the national census as being restricted to those municipalities with 50,000 or more inhabitants. Although many settlements with fewer than 50,000 inhabitants were satellite towns of Seoul or other large cities or mining communities in northeastern Gangwon Province, which would be considered urban in terms of the living conditions and occupations of the inhabitants, they were still officially classified as rural.

The dislocation caused by the Korean War accounted for the rapid increase in urban population during the early 1950s. Hundreds of thousands of refugees, many of them from North Korea, streamed into the cities. During the post-Korean War period, rural people left their ancestral villages in search of greater economic and educational opportunities in the cities. By the late 1960s, migration had become a serious problem, not only because cities were terribly overcrowded, but also because the rural areas were losing the most youthful and productive members of their labor force.

In 1970, the Park Chung Hee government launched the Saemaul Undong (New Community Movement) as a rural reconstruction and self-help movement to improve economic conditions in the villages, close the wide gap in income between rural and urban areas, and stem urban migration—as well as to build a political base. Despite a huge amount of government-sponsored publicity, especially during the Park era, it was not clear by the late 1980s that the Saemaul undong had achieved its objectives. By that time, many, if not most, farming and fishing villages consisted of older persons; relatively few able-bodied men and women remained to work in the fields or to fish. This trend was apparent in government statistics for the 1986–87 period: the proportion of people fifty years old or older living in farming communities grew from 28.7% in 1986 to 30.6% in 1987, while the number of people in their twenties living in farming communities declined from 11.3% to 10.8%. The nationwide percentages for people fifty years old or older and in their twenties were, in 1986, 14.9% and 20.2%, respectively.

In 1985, the largest cities were Seoul (9,645,932 inhabitants), Busan (3,516,807), Daegu (2,030,672), Incheon (1,387,491), Gwangju (906,129), and Daejeon (866,695). According to government statistics, the population of Seoul, one of the world's largest cities, surpassed 10 million people in late 1988. Seoul's average annual population growth rate during the late 1980s was more than 3%. Two-thirds of this growth was attributable to migration rather than to natural increase. Surveys revealed that "new employment or seeking a new job," "job transfer," and "business" were major reasons given by new immigrants for coming to the capital. Other factors cited by immigrants included "education" and "a more convenient area to live."

To alleviate overcrowding in Seoul's downtown area, the city government drew up a master plan in the mid-1980s that envisioned the development of four "core zones" by 2000: the original downtown area, Yongdongpo-Yeouido, Yongdong, and Jamsil. Satellite towns would also be established or expanded. In the late 1980s, statistics revealed that the daytime or commuter population of downtown Seoul was as much as six times the officially registered population. If the master plan is successful, many commuters will travel to work in a core area nearer their homes, and the downtown area's daytime population will decrease. Many government ministries have been moved out of Seoul, and the army, navy, and air force headquarters have been relocated to Daejeon.

In 1985, the population of Seoul constituted 23.8% of the national total. Provincial cities, however, experienced equal and, in many cases, greater expansion than the capital. Growth was particularly spectacular in the southeastern coastal region, which encompasses the port cities of Busan, Masan, Yosu, Jinhae, Ulsan, and Pohang. Census figures show that Ulsan's population increased eighteenfold, growing from 30,000 to 551,300 inhabitants between 1960 and 1985. With the exception of Yosu, all of these cities are in South Gyeongsang Province, a region that has been an especially favored recipient of government development projects. By comparison, the population of Gwangju, capital of South Jeolla Province, increased less than threefold between 1960 and 1985, growing from 315,000 to 906,129 inhabitants.

Rapid urban growth has brought familiar problems to developed and developing countries alike. The construction of large numbers of high-rise apartment complexes in Seoul and other large cities alleviated housing shortages to some extent. But it also imposed hardship on the tens of thousands of people who were obliged to relocate from their old neighborhoods because they could not afford the rents in the new buildings. In the late 1980s, squatter areas consisting of one-story shacks still existed in some parts of Seoul. Housing for all but the wealthiest was generally cramped. The concentration of factories in urban areas, the rapid growth of motorized traffic, and the widespread use of coal for heating during the severe winter months caused dangerous levels of air and water pollution, issues that still persist today even after years of environmentally friendly policies.

In 2016, 82.59 percent of South Korea's total population lived in urban areas and cities.

== Vital statistics ==
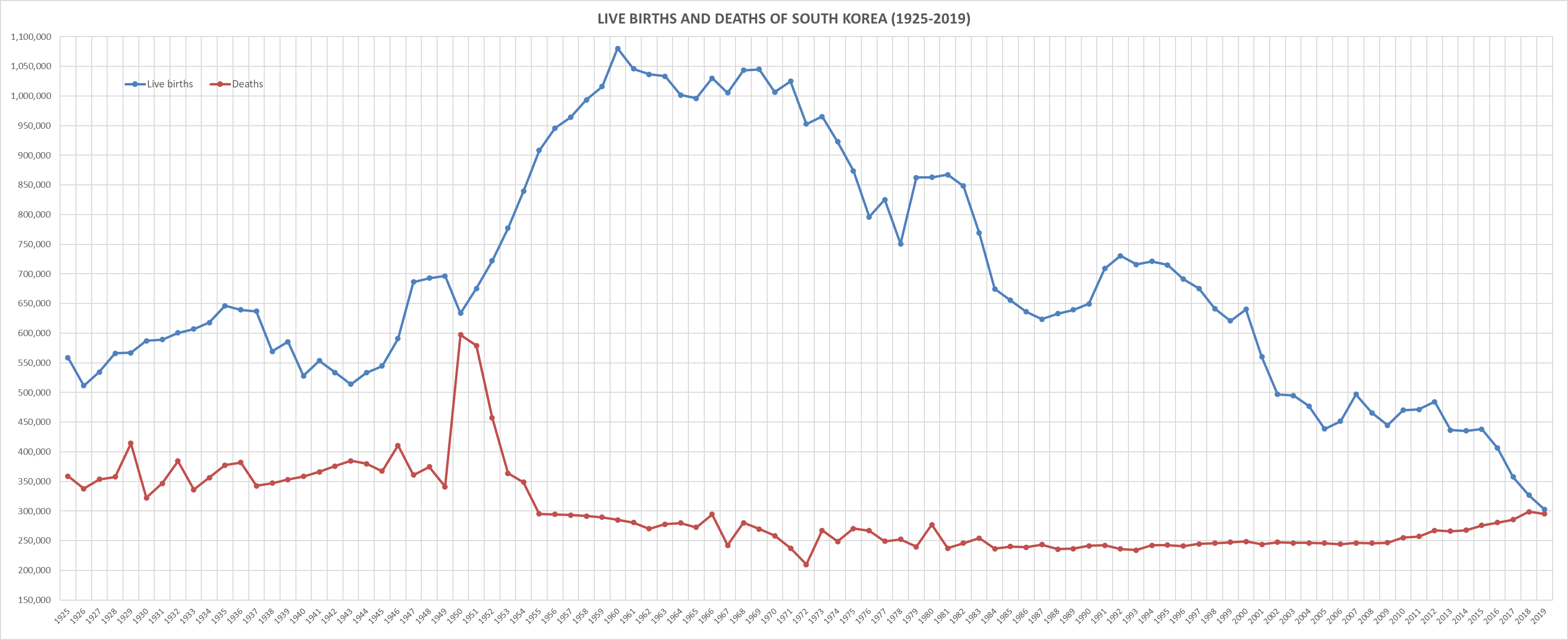
Live births and deaths of South Korea 1925–2019

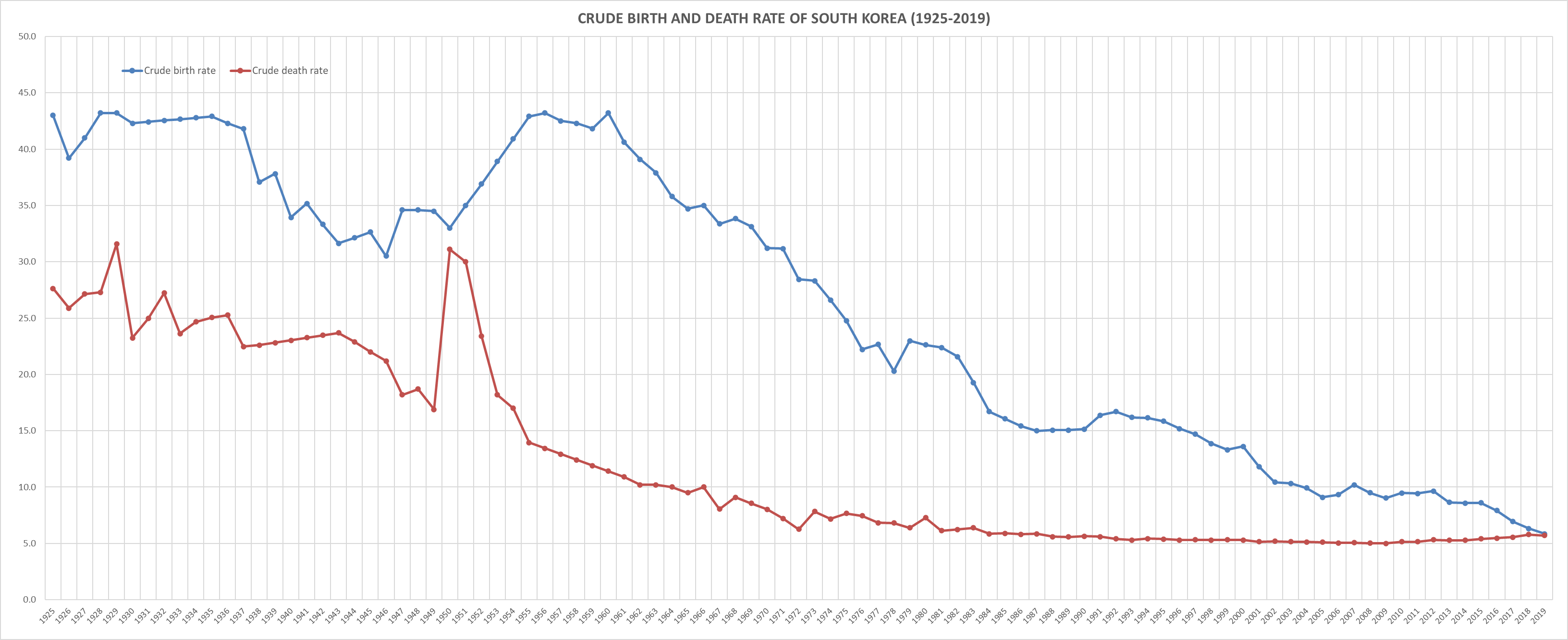
Crude birth and death rate of South Korea 1925–2019

Notable events in South Korean demography:

- 1910–1945 – Korea under Japanese rule, Koreans in Japan
- 1945 – End of World War II
- 1950–1953 – Korean War
- 1955–1960 – Mid-20th-century baby boom

	Average population	Live births	Deaths	Natural change	Crude birth rate (per 1000)	Crude death rate (per 1000)	Natural change (per 1000)	Total fertility rate (TFR)	Net Migration Rate (per 1000)
1925	12,997,611	558,897	359,042	199,855	43.0	27.6	15.4	6.59	
1926	13,052,741	511,667	337,948	173,719	39.2	25.9	13.3		−9.1
1927	13,037,169	534,524	353,818	180,706	41.0	27.1	13.9		−15.1
1928	13,105,131	566,142	357,701	208,441	43.2	27.3	15.9		−10.7
1929	13,124,279	566,969	414,366	152,603	43.2	31.6	11.6		−10.2
1930	13,880,469	587,144	322,611	264,533	42.3	23.2	19.1	6.41	35.4
1931	13,895,052	589,428	346,800	242,628	42.4	25.0	17.4		−16.4
1932	14,117,191	600,545	384,287	216,258	42.5	27.2	15.3		0.4
1933	14,229,277	607,021	336,232	270,789	42.7	23.6	19.1		−11.2
1934	14,449,155	618,135	356,515	261,620	42.8	24.7	18.1		−2.9
1935	15,061,960	646,158	377,454	268,704	42.9	25.1	17.8	6.60	22.8
1936	15,114,775	639,355	381,806	257,549	42.3	25.3	17.0		−13.5
1937	15,235,383	636,839	342,575	294,264	41.8	22.5	19.3		−11.4
1938	15,358,193	569,299	347,025	222,274	37.1	22.6	14.5		−6.5
1939	15,486,028	585,482	353,391	232,091	37.8	22.8	15.0		−6.7
1940	15,559,741	527,964	358,496	169,468	33.9	23.0	10.9	6.56	−6.2
1941	15,745,478	553,690	366,239	187,451	35.2	23.3	11.9		−0.1
1942	16,013,742	533,768	376,003	157,765	33.3	23.5	9.8		6.9
1943	16,239,721	513,846	384,881	128,965	31.6	23.7	7.9		6.0
1944	16,599,172	533,215	380,121	153,094	32.1	22.9	9.2	6.78	12.4
1945	16,695,819	544,786	367,308	177,478	32.6	22.0	10.6		−4.8
1946	19,369,270	590,763	410,629	180,134	30.5	21.2	9.3		128.7
1947	19,836,234	686,334	361,019	325,315	35.0	18.2	16.8		7.2
1948	20,027,393	692,948	374,512	318,436	34.6	18.7	15.9		−6.4
1949	20,188,641	696,508	341,188	355,320	34.5	16.9	17.6		−9.6
1950	19,211,386	633,976	597,474	36,502	33.0	31.1	1.9	5.09	-52.8
1951	19,304,737	675,666	579,142	96,524	35.0	30.0	5.0		−0.2
1952	19,566,860	722,018	457,865	264,153	36.9	23.4	13.5		−0.1
1953	19,979,069	777,186	363,619	413,567	38.9	18.2	20.7		−0.1
1954	20,520,601	839,293	348,850	490,433	40.9	17.0	23.9		2.5
1955	21,168,611	908,134	295,302	612,832	42.9	14.0	28.9	6.33	1.7
1956	21,897,911	945,990	294,344	651,646	43.2	13.4	29.8		3.5
1957	22,681,233	963,952	293,344	670,608	42.5	12.9	29.6		5.0
1958	23,490,027	993,628	291,864	701,764	42.3	12.4	29.9		4.6
1959	24,295,786	1,016,173	289,525	726,648	41.8	11.9	29.9		3.3
1960	25,012,374	1,080,535	285,350	795,185	43.2	11.4	31.8	6.16	−3.1
1961	25,765,673	1,046,086	280,846	765,240	40.6	10.9	29.7	5.99	−0.5
1962	26,513,030	1,036,659	270,433	760,266	39.1	10.2	28.9	5.79	−0.7
1963	27,261,747	1,033,220	278,070	755,150	37.9	10.2	27.7	5.57	−0.2
1964	27,984,155	1,001,833	279,842	721,991	35.8	10.0	25.8	5.36	0
1965	28,704,674	996,052	272,694	723,358	34.7	9.5	25.2	5.16	−0.1
1966	29,435,571	1,030,245	294,356	735,889	35.0	10.0	25.0	4.99	−0.2
1967	30,130,983	1,005,293	242,280	763,013	33.4	8.0	25.4	4.84	−2.2
1968	30,838,302	1,043,321	280,308	763,013	33.8	9.1	24.7	4.72	−1.8
1969	31,544,266	1,044,943	270,023	774,920	33.1	8.6	24.5	4.62	−2.2
1970	32,240,827	1,006,645	258,589	748,056	31.2	8.0	23.2	4.53	−1.6
1971	32,882,704	1,024,773	237,528	787,245	31.2	7.2	23.9	4.54	−4.4
1972	33,505,406	952,780	210,071	742,709	28.4	6.3	22.2	4.12	−3.6
1973	34,103,149	965,521	267,460	698,061	28.3	7.8	20.5	4.07	−2.9
1974	34,692,266	922,823	248,807	674,016	26.6	7.2	19.4	3.77	−2.4
1975	35,280,725	874,030	270,657	603,373	24.8	7.7	17.1	3.43	−0.4
1976	35,848,523	796,331	266,857	529,474	22.2	7.4	14.8	3.00	1.1
1977	36,411,795	825,339	249,254	576,085	22.7	6.8	15.8	2.99	−0.4
1978	36,969,185	750,728	252,298	498,430	20.3	6.8	13.5	2.64	1.6
1979	37,534,236	862,669	239,986	622,683	23.0	6.4	16.6	2.90	−1.5
1980	38,123,775	862,835	277,284	585,551	22.6	7.3	15.4	2.82	0.1
1981	38,723,248	867,409	237,481	629,928	22.4	6.1	16.3	2.57	−0.8
1982	39,326,352	848,312	245,767	602,545	21.6	6.2	15.3	2.39	0
1983	39,910,403	769,155	254,563	514,592	19.3	6.4	12.9	2.06	1.7
1984	40,405,956	674,793	236,445	438,348	16.7	5.9	10.8	1.74	1.4
1985	40,855,744	655,489	240,418	415,071	16.1	5.9	10.2	1.66	0.8
1986	41,263,674	636,019	239,256	396,763	15.4	5.8	9.6	1.58	0.3
1987	41,682,690	623,831	243,504	380,327	15.0	5.9	9.1	1.53	0.9
1988	42,071,247	633,092	235,779	397,313	15.1	5.6	9.5	1.55	−0.2
1989	42,484,038	639,431	236,818	402,613	15.1	5.6	9.5	1.56	0.2
1990	42,896,283	649,738	241,616	408,122	15.2	5.6	9.5	1.57	0.1
1991	43,315,704	709,275	242,270	467,005	16.4	5.6	10.8	1.71	−1.1
1992	43,787,962	730,678	236,162	494,516	16.7	5.4	11.3	1.76	−0.5
1993	44,264,628	715,826	234,257	481,569	16.0	5.2	10.8	1.654	−0.1
1994	44,731,540	721,185	242,439	478,746	16.0	5.4	10.6	1.656	−0.3
1995	45,182,991	715,020	242,838	472,182	15.7	5.3	10.3	1.634	−0.5
1996	45,634,681	691,226	241,149	450,077	15.0	5.2	9.8	1.574	0
1997	46,073,580	675,394	244,693	430,701	14.4	5.2	9.2	1.537	0.2
1998	46,506,503	641,594	245,825	395,769	13.6	5.2	8.4	1.464	0.8
1999	46,876,677	620,668	247,734	372,934	13.0	5.2	7.8	1.425	−0.1
2000	47,258,111	640,089	248,740	391,349	13.3	5.2	8.2	1.480	−0.2
2001	47,580,164	559,934	243,813	316,121	11.6	5.0	6.5	1.309	0.1
2002	47,854,736	496,911	247,524	249,387	10.2	5.1	5.1	1.178	0.5
2003	48,072,330	495,036	246,463	248,573	10.2	5.1	5.1	1.191	−0.6
2004	48,302,419	476,958	246,220	230,738	9.8	5.0	4.7	1.164	0
2005	48,504,561	438,707	245,874	192,833	8.9	5.0	3.9	1.085	0.2
2006	48,758,292	451,759	244,162	207,597	9.2	5.0	4.2	1.132	0.9
2007	49,063,638	496,822	246,482	250,340	10.0	5.0	5.1	1.259	1.1
2008	49,274,708	465,892	246,113	219,779	9.4	5.0	4.4	1.192	−0.2
2009	49,447,835	444,849	246,942	197,907	9.0	5.0	4.0	1.149	−0.5
2010	49,714,112	470,171	255,405	214,766	9.4	5.1	4.3	1.226	1.0
2011	50,036,638	471,265	257,396	213,869	9.4	5.1	4.3	1.244	2.2
2012	50,329,853	484,550	267,221	217,329	9.6	5.3	4.3	1.297	1.5
2013	50,568,893	436,455	266,257	170,198	8.6	5.3	3.4	1.187	1.4
2014	50,806,659	435,435	267,692	167,743	8.6	5.3	3.3	1.205	1.4
2015	51,024,947	438,420	275,895	162,525	8.6	5.4	3.2	1.239	1.1
2016	51,217,803	406,243	280,827	125,416	7.9	5.5	2.5	1.172	1.3
2017	51,361,911	357,771	285,534	72,237	7.0	5.6	1.4	1.052	1.4
2018	51,585,058	326,822	298,820	28,002	6.4	5.8	0.6	0.977	3.8
2019	51,764,822	302,676	295,132	7,544	5.9	5.7	0.2	0.918	3.3
2020	51,836,239	272,337	304,948	−32,611	5.3	5.9	−0.6	0.837	2.0
2021	51,769,539	260,562	317,680	−57,118	5.1	6.2	−1.1	0.808	−0.2
2022	51,672,569	249,186	372,939	−123,753	4.9	7.3	−2.4	0.778	0.5
2023	51,712,619	230,028	352,511	−122,483	4.5	6.9	−2.4	0.721	3.1
2024	51,751,065	238,343	358,356	−120,013	4.7	7.0	–2.3	0.748	3.1
2025	51,684,564	254,457	363,389	−108,931	4.9	7.0	–2.1	0.800	0.8
2026(e)	51,609,121							0.91*	

* Data as of January–August 2026.

=== Current vital statistics ===
Period	Live births	Deaths	Natural increase
January–August 2025	169,211	242,119	–72,908
January–August 2026	193,784	238,050	–44,266
Difference	▲ +24,573 (+14.52%)	▼ –4,069 (–1.68%)	▲ +28,642

View source data.

=== Total fertility rates by region ===
2025
Province and cities	TFR
Seoul	0.800
Busan	0.630
Daegu	0.740
Incheon	0.820
Gwangju	0.760
Daejeon	0.830
Ulsan	0.920
Gyeonggi	0.840
South Korea	0.748
Jeonbuk	0.850
Gyeongsangnam	0.880
Jeju	0.870
Chungcheongbuk	0.960

=== Total fertility rate from 1900 to 1924 ===
The total fertility rate is the number of children born per woman. It is based on fairly good data for the entire period. Sources: Our World In Data and Gapminder Foundation.

Years	1900	1901	1902	1903	1904	1905	1906	1907	1908	1909	1910
Total fertility rate in South Korea	6	6	5.99	5.99	5.98	5.98	5.97	5.96	5.96	5.96	

Years	1911	1912	1913	1914	1915	1916	1917	1918	1919	1920
Total fertility rate in South Korea	5.95	5.95	5.94	5.94	5.93	5.93	5.92	5.92	5.93	5.94

Years	1921	1922	1923	1924
Total fertility rate in South Korea	5.95	5.96	5.97	5.95

=== UN estimates ===
Period	Live births per year	Deaths per year	Natural change per year	CBR^{1}	CDR^{1}	NC^{1}	TFR^{1}	IMR^{1}
1950–1955	722,000	331,000	391,000	35.8	16.4	19.4	5.05	138.0
1955–1960	1,049,000	356,000	693,000	45.4	15.4	30.0	6.33	114.4
1960–1965	1,067,000	347,000	720,000	39.9	13.0	27.0	5.63	89.7
1965–1970	985,000	298,000	687,000	32.9	9.9	23.0	4.71	64.2
1970–1975	1,004,000	259,000	746,000	30.4	7.8	22.5	4.28	38.1
1975–1980	833,000	253,000	581,000	23.1	7.0	16.1	2.92	33.2
1980–1985	795,000	248,000	547,000	20.4	6.4	14.0	2.23	24.6
1985–1990	647,000	239,000	407,000	15.5	5.7	9.8	1.60	14.9
1990–1995	702,000	239,000	463,000	16.0	5.5	10.6	1.70	9.7
1995–2000	615,000	247,000	368,000	13.6	5.5	8.1	1.51	6.6
2000–2005	476,000	245,000	231,000	10.2	5.3	5.0	1.22	5.3
2005–2010	477,000	243,000	234,000	10.0	5.1	4.9	1.29	3.8
2010–2015	455,000	275,000	180,000				1.26	
^{1} CBR = crude birth rate (per 1000); CDR = crude death rate (per 1000); NC = natural change (per 1000); TFR = total fertility rate (number of children per woman); IMR = infant mortality rate per 1000 births

=== Life expectancy ===
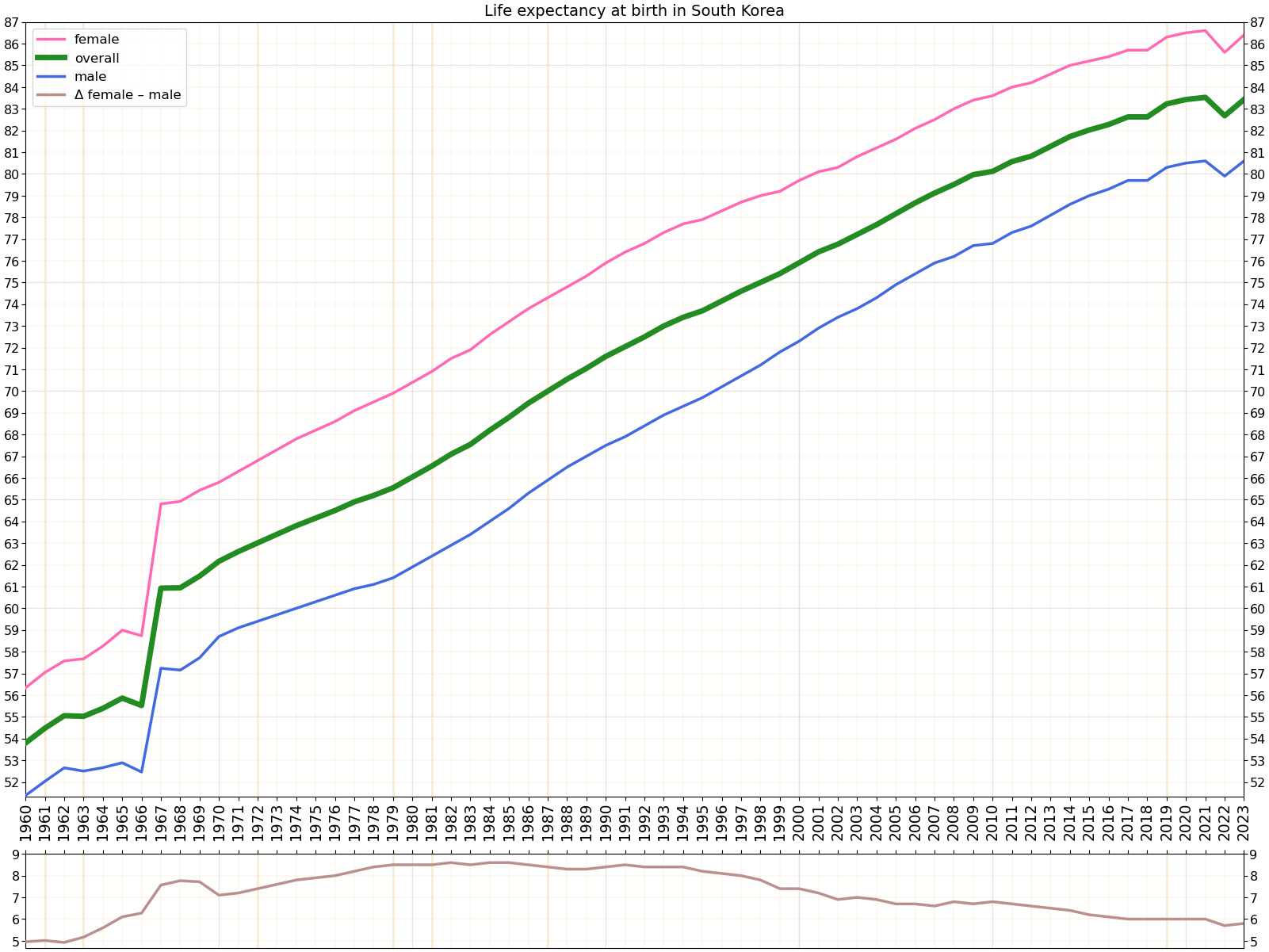
Life expectancy in South Korea since 1960 by gender

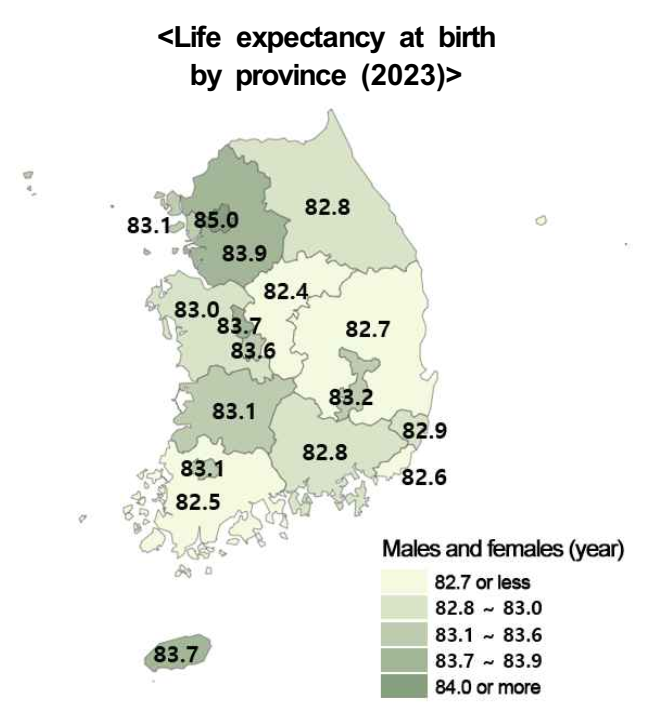
Life expectancy in regions of South Korea in 2023

Remaining life expectancy at certain ages for the country as a whole, Gyeonggi Province and Seoul, in 2023.

Age	South Korea on average				Gyeonggi Province				Seoul			
Age	overall	male	female	sex gap	overall	male	female	sex gap	overall	male	female	sex gap
0	83.5	80.6	86.4	5.8	83.9	81.2	86.6	5.4	85.0	82.0	88.0	6.0
1	82.7	79.8	85.6	5.8	83.1	80.4	85.7	5.3	84.2	81.2	87.1	5.9
5	78.7	75.8	81.6	5.8	79.1	76.5	81.8	5.3	80.2	77.2	83.2	6.0
10	73.8	70.9	76.7	5.8	74.2	71.5	76.8	5.3	75.2	72.2	78.2	6.0
15	68.8	65.9	71.7	5.8	69.2	66.5	71.9	5.4	70.3	67.3	73.2	5.9
20	63.9	61.0	66.8	5.8	64.3	61.6	66.9	5.3	65.3	62.4	68.3	5.9
25	59.0	56.1	61.9	5.8	59.4	56.7	62.0	5.3	60.4	57.5	63.3	5.8
30	54.1	51.3	57.0	5.7	54.5	51.9	57.1	5.2	55.5	52.6	58.4	5.8
35	49.3	46.4	52.1	5.7	49.6	47.0	52.2	5.2	50.6	47.7	53.5	5.8
40	44.4	41.6	47.2	5.6	44.8	42.2	47.3	5.1	45.8	42.9	48.7	5.8
45	39.7	36.9	42.4	5.5	40.0	37.5	42.5	5.0	41.0	38.1	43.8	5.7
50	35.0	32.3	37.6	5.3	35.2	32.8	37.7	4.9	36.2	33.4	39.0	5.6
55	30.4	27.8	32.9	5.1	30.6	28.2	32.9	4.7	31.6	28.9	34.2	5.3
60	25.9	23.4	28.2	4.8	26.1	23.8	28.2	4.4	27.1	24.5	29.5	5.0
65	21.5	19.2	23.6	4.4	21.6	19.6	23.6	4.0	22.6	20.3	24.9	4.6
70	17.2	15.2	19.0	3.8	17.4	15.5	19.0	3.5	18.3	16.2	20.3	4.1
75	13.2	11.6	14.7	3.1	13.4	11.8	14.7	2.9	14.2	12.4	15.9	3.5
80	9.7	8.3	10.7	2.4	9.8	8.5	10.8	2.3	10.5	9.0	11.8	2.8
85	6.8	5.7	7.5	1.8	6.9	5.9	7.5	1.6	7.5	6.3	8.4	2.1
90	4.7	3.9	5.0	1.1	4.7	4.1	5.1	1.0	5.3	4.3	5.8	1.5
95	3.2	2.6	3.4	0.8	3.2	2.8	3.4	0.6	3.7	3.0	4.0	1.0
100	2.2	1.8	2.3	0.5	2.3	2.0	2.3	0.3	2.7	2.1	2.8	0.7

Data source: Statistics Korea

==== Life expectancy at birth from 1908 to 2015 ====
Sources: Our World In Data and the United Nations.

1865–1950

Years	1908	1913	1918	1923	1928	1933	1938	1942	1950
Life expectancy in South Korea	23.5	25.0	27.0	29.5	33.6	37.4	42.6	44.9	46.7

1950–2015

Period	Life expectancy in years	Period	Life expectancy in years
1950–1955	47.9	1985–1990	70.3
1955–1960	51.2	1990–1995	72.9
1960–1965	54.8	1995–2000	75.0
1965–1970	58.8	2000–2005	77.2
1970–1975	63.1	2005–2010	79.4
1975–1980	65.0	2010–2015	81.3
1980–1985	67.4	2015–2020	83.5

Source: UN World Population Prospects

== Ethnic groups ==
1. Korean citizens (94.6%)
2. foreign residents (5.44%)

South Korea is a largely ethnically homogeneous country with an absolute majority of the Korean ethnicity from estimates but the country itself doesn't collect ethnic or racial data formally. However, with its emergence as an economic powerhouse, demand for foreign immigrants increased and in 2007 the number of foreign citizen residents in South Korea passed the one million mark for the first time in history, and the number reached 2 million in 2016. Of those, 1,016,000 came from China, with more than half of them being ethnic Koreans of Chinese citizenship. The next largest group was from Vietnam with 149,000 residents. The third largest group was from the United States with 117,000 residents, excluding the American troops stationed in the country. Thailand, Philippines, Kazakhstan and other countries followed. Many of the foreign residents from China and the former Soviet Union, including Russia and Kazakhstan, are ethnic Koreans (see Koreans in China, Koryo-saram). There are 2,783,247 foreign residents in South Korea as of December 2025, 5.44% of the total population.

=== Chinese in South Korea ===
Since The People's Republic of China and South Korea established their diplomatic relationship in 1992, the number of Chinese immigrants, majorly Joseonjok, has continued to increase. In the early 1990s, a trade agreement allowed merchants from China to conduct business trades in South Korea. There are also Chaoxianzu in Korea: Chinese nationals of Korean ethnicity living in South Korea.

=== North Americans in South Korea ===
South Korea is a country with one of the largest American immigrant populations in the world, numbering over 100,000. Most Americans tend to be Korean Americans who have returned to South Korea. About 43,000 Korean Americans reported living in South Korea in 2020, more than twice the number in 2005. South Korea also has a Canadian population of over 20,000.

=== Vietnamese in South Korea ===
The relationship between Vietnamese and Koreans date back to when Lý Dương Côn left for Goryeo after succession of power dispute. Likewise in 1226, Lý Long Tường, a prince of the Lý dynasty of Đại Việt (in modern-day Vietnam), later became Yi Yongsang (이용상) of Hwasan, a general of Korea. He is an ancestor of one branch of the Lee (or Rhee) family today in South Korea. Nowadays, most Vietnamese immigrants are either manual labor workers, marriage immigrants, or cooks in Vietnamese cuisines.

=== Filipinos in South Korea ===
Relationship between Filipinos and South Koreans can be traced back to 1950s during the Korean War. Over 7,500 Filipino soldiers fought on the United Nations' side to help South Korea. As of 2019, there were more than 55,000 Filipino immigrants living in South Korea. Population decline in rural regions led to shortage of young people especially young women in those areas and it led many Koreans to marry Filipino brides.

== Languages ==
The Korean language is the native language spoken by the vast majority of the population. English is widely taught in both public and private schools as a foreign language. However, general fluency in English in the country is relatively low compared to other industrialized developed countries. There is a Chinese minority who speak Mandarin and Cantonese. Some elderly people may still be able to speak Japanese, which was de facto (1910–1938) and de jure (1938–1945) official during the Japanese rule in Korea.

In different areas of South Korea, different dialects are spoken. For example, the Gyeongsang dialect spoken around Busan and Daegu to the south is often perceived to sound quite rough and aggressive compared to standard Korean.

== Religion ==
Koreans have historically lived under the religious influences of Korean shamanism, Buddhism, Daoism, or Confucianism.

Korea is a country where three of the world's major religions, Christianity, Buddhism, and Confucianism, peacefully coexist. According to 2015 statistics, 43.1% of Korean population has a religion and 2008 statistics show that over 510 religious organizations were in the South Korea population.

- Irreligious: 51%
- Christianity: 31%
- Buddhism: 15%
- Islam: 0.3%
- Other religions: 2%

== Migration ==
South Korea net migration, 2000–present
Year	Immigration	Emigration	Net Migration
2000	371,264	363,141	8,123
2001	373,683	405,892	−32,209
2002	387,064	403,319	−16,255
2003	404,475	446,888	−42,413
2004	422,524	471,524	−49,000
2005	530,243	624,748	−94,505
2006	613,678	566,045	47,633
2007	630,330	552,265	77,678
2008	658,651	603,349	55,302
2009	591,626	571,248	20,378
2010	632,102	549,833	82,269
2011	658,475	567,570	90,905
2012	643,009	636,403	6,606
2013	696,166	610,954	85,212
2014	735,181	593,530	141,651
2015	683,716	622,290	61,426
2016	714,023	638,664	75,359
2017	758,106	651,312	106,794
2018	817,794	661,967	156,007
2019	749,188	717,413	31,775
2020	673,315	560,402	112,813
2021	410,398	476,376	−65,978
2022	606,043	518,014	88,029
2023	698,408	577,099	121,309
2024	727,357	601,954	125,403
2025	685,242	610,860	74,382

=== Emigration ===
Large-scale emigration from Korea began around 1904 and continued until the end of World War II. During the Japanese rule, many Koreans emigrated to Manchuria (present-day China's northeastern provinces of Liaoning, Jilin, and Heilongjiang), other parts of China, the Soviet Union, Hawaii, and the contiguous United States.

Most emigrated for economic reasons; employment opportunities were scarce, and many Korean farmers lost their land after the Japanese introduced a system of land registration and private land tenure, imposed higher land taxes, and promoted the growth of an absentee landlord class charging exorbitant rents. Koreans from the northern provinces of Korea migrated mainly to Manchuria, China, and Siberia. Most people from the southern provinces went to Japan or the United States. Koreans were conscripted into Japanese labor battalions or the Japanese army, especially during World War II. In the 1940–44 period, nearly 2 million Koreans lived in Japan, 1.4 million in Manchuria, 600,000 in Siberia, and 130,000 in China. An estimated 40,000 Koreans were scattered among other countries, mainly the United States. At the end of World War II, approximately 2 million Koreans were repatriated from Japan and Manchuria.

More than 4 million ethnic Koreans lived outside the peninsula during the early 1980s. The largest group, about 1.7 million people, lived in China, the descendants of the Korean farmers who had left the country during the Japanese occupation. Most had assumed Chinese citizenship. The Soviet Union had about 430,000 ethnic Koreans, known as the Koryo-saram, scattered in several Soviet republics.

By contrast, many of Japan's approximately 700,000 Koreans had below-average standards of living. This situation occurred partly because of discrimination by the Japanese majority and partly because a large number of resident Koreans, loyal to the North Korean regime of Kim Il Sung, preferred to remain separate from and hostile to the Japanese mainstream. The pro–North Korea Chongryon (General Association of Korean Residents in Japan) initially was more successful than the pro–South Korea Mindan (Association for Korean Residents in Japan) in attracting adherents among residents in Japan. Since diplomatic relations were established between Seoul and Tokyo in 1965, however, the South Korean government has taken an active role in promoting the interests of their residents in Japan in negotiations with the Japanese government. It also has provided subsidies to Korean schools in Japan and other community activities.

By the end of 1988, the South Korean diaspora was estimated at two million people. North America was home to over 1.2 million. Smaller Korean communities formed in Australia (100,000), Central and South America (45,000), the Middle East (12,000), Western Europe (40,000), New Zealand (30,000), other Asian countries (27,000), and Africa (25,000). A limited number of South Korean government-sponsored migrants settled in Chile, Argentina, and other Latin American countries.

Because of South Korea's rapid economic expansion, an increasing number of its citizens reside abroad on a temporary basis as business executives, technical personnel, foreign students, and construction workers. A large number of formerly expatriate South Koreans have returned to South Korea primarily because of the country's much improved economic conditions and the difficulties they experienced in adjusting to living abroad.

=== Immigration ===
There are 2,783,247 foreign residents in South Korea as of December 2025, 5.44% of the total population. Chinese nationals make up approximately one-third of this population (980,670), followed by Vietnamese (337,183), Americans (180,230), Thais (169,848), Uzbeks (102,804), Filipinos (74,125), Japanese (70,375), and all others (868,012). As of December 2025, out of all foreign nationals, 2,159,052 are long-term residents and 624,195 are short-term residents. These figures exclude foreign-born citizens who have naturalized and obtained South Korean citizenship; the total number of naturalized South Korean citizens from 1957 to 2019 surpassed 200,000.

Fair amount of the foreign residents from some countries are Korean descendants. Two thirds of Chinese, half of Russian, one fourth of Uzbeks are repatriated ethnic Koreans (labelled "Overseas Koreans") who may meet criteria for expedited acquisition of South Korean citizenship. They are Korean Chinese and Koryo-saram. Also, sizeable number of migrants from countries with primarily multicultural immigrant population, such as Australia, New Zealand, Canada, United States, and Japan are also of Korean ethnic descent.

Number of Foreign Residents in South Korea of Different Ethnicity

Country	2024 (Sept)	2021 (Aug)	2019
China	987,280	851,615	1,121,800
Vietnam	318,160	209,839	224,518
Thailand	189,361	174,052	209,909
United States	182,192	145,724	156,982
Uzbekistan	93,979	30,389	34,638
Nepal	73,148	37,092	42,781
Russia	71,689	48,511	61,427
Philippines	66,932	43,592	62,398
Cambodia	65,002		
Indonesia	64,939	34,514	48,854
Mongolia	56,383	37,963	48,185
Myanmar	52,070		29,294
Japan	49,901	28,631	86,196
Kazakhstan	45,742		18,340
Sri Lanka	35,216		25,064
Taiwan	34,799		42,767
Canada	31,238	45,181	56,320
Bangladesh	30,232		15,222
Pakistan	18,246		13,990
India	17,856		12,929
Australia	17,356	41,239	47,565
Malaysia	13,443		14,790
Kyrgyzstan	11,755		
France	11,346		
Germany	10,763		
Laos	10,520		
United Kingdom	10,256		
Hong Kong	9,929		
Singapore	7,476		
Ukraine	5,513		
New Zealand	5,206		
Republic of South Africa	5,114		
Turkey	4,921		
Egypt	3,388		
Italy	3,006		
Spain	2,980		
Nigeria	2,937		
Brazil	2,896		
Tajikistan	2,842		
Mexico	2,693		
Netherlands	2,676		
Iran	2,187		
Morocco	2,017		
Poland	1,912		
Ghana	1,620		
Switzerland	1,572		
Ethiopia	1,535		
Sweden	1,420		
Belgium	1,252		
Colombia	1,068		
Peru	1,036		
Libya	968		
Denmark	991		
Ireland	956		
Cameroon	841		
Norway	839		
Israel	810		
Austria	811		
Kenya	811		
Tunisia	802		
Argentina	736		
Uganda	673		
Romania	661		
Tanzania	647		
Chile	645		
Finland	624		
Portugal	621		
Azerbaijan	608		
Rwanda	591		
Czech Republic	518		
Ecuador	506		
Belarus	503		
Hungary	467		
Greece	451		
Bulgaria	355		
Lithuania	316		
Venezuela	250		
Slovakia	246		
Croatia	243		
Paraguay	241		
Latvia	223		
Georgia	206		
Serbia	192		
Costa Rica	177		
Guatemala	174		
Dominican Republic	173		
Bolivia	165		
Haiti	162		
Estonia	158		
El Salvador	127		
Slovenia	123		
Honduras	121		
Panama	115		
Armenia	113		
Luxembourg	101		
Moldova	92		
Albania	83		
Jamaica	78		
Uruguay	61		
Nicaragua	61		
Cuba	52		
Dominica	50		
North Macedonia	48		
Trinidad and Tobago	47		
Bosnia and Herzegovina	46		
Malta	45		
Saint Kitts and Nevis	43		
Kosovo	40		
Iceland	37		
Montenegro	30		
The Bahamas	19		
Guyana	18		
Grenada	12		
Barbados	11		
Suriname	10		
San Marino	10		
Antigua and Barbuda	9		
Belize	8		
Saint Lucia	6		
Andorra	3		
Saint Vincent	3		
Liechtenstein	2		
Others			104,898
Total	2,245,912	1,976,000	2,524,656

== See also ==
- Demographics of North Korea
- Koreans
- Chinese people in Korea
- Vietnamese people in South Korea
- Filipinos in South Korea
