= Immigration to North Korea =

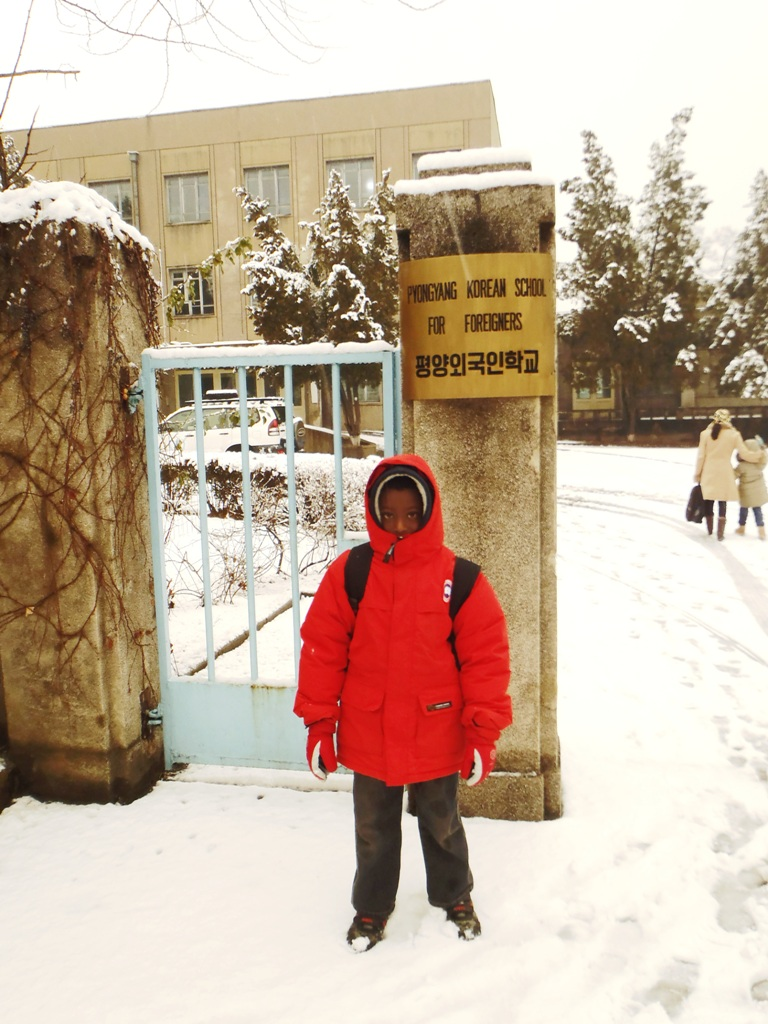
School for foreign children in Pyongyang

Immigration to North Korea refers to the movement of people into North Korea (DPRK), a highly secretive and authoritarian state in East Asia. The country maintains strict controls over both emigration and immigration, with the government tightly restricting freedom of movement within its borders and abroad. North Korea rarely allows foreign nationals to immigrate permanently, and most documented cases involve individuals returning to the country after periods abroad, including former defectors who are sometimes encouraged to return through government campaigns offering incentives such as money and housing. The vast majority of North Koreans who leave the country do so as refugees or defectors, often seeking asylum in South Korea or China, rather than as part of regular migration flows.

North Korea’s immigration policy is shaped by its isolationist stance, economic conditions, and political ideology. The state closely monitors and controls all forms of cross-border movement, and unauthorized travel is punishable by law. The country’s visa policy requires most visitors to obtain advance approval, and tourism for certain nationalities, such as Americans, is currently prohibited. Despite these restrictions, North Korea has occasionally allowed limited numbers of foreign workers, diplomats, and humanitarian personnel to enter, though such access is tightly regulated and subject to political considerations.

== From South Korea ==
Husband and wife Choe Deok-sin and Ryu Mi-yong defected to the North in 1986. Ryu became the chairwoman of the North Korean Chondoist Chongu Party. She was a standing committee member of the 10th Supreme People's Assembly. In 2000, she led a delegation of defectors to the South on an officially sanctioned reunion with family they left behind. Ryu died of lung cancer in November 2016. Ryu's son, Choe In-guk, reportedly defected to North Korea in July 2019.

=== Returning to North Korea ===
In some cases, defectors from North Korea voluntarily return to North Korea. Exact numbers are unknown; however, in 2013, the Korea Times reported the number of double defectors to be increasing. Double defectors either take a route through third countries such as China, or may defect directly from South Korea. In 2014, the Unification Ministry of South Korea said it only had records of 13 double defections, three of whom defected to South Korea again. However, the total number is thought to be higher. A former South Korean MP estimated that in 2012 about 100 defectors returned to North Korea via China. In 2015, it was reported that about 700 defectors living in South Korea are unaccounted for and have possibly fled to China or Southeast Asia in hopes of returning to North Korea. In one case, a double defector re-entered North Korea four times.

North Korea under Kim Jong-un has allegedly started a campaign to attract defectors to return with promises of money, housing, and employment. According to unconfirmed reports, government operatives have contacted defectors living in South Korea and offered them guarantees that their families are safe, 50 million South Korean Won ($44,000), and a public appearance on TV. It was reported in 2013 that North Korea had aired at least 13 such appearances on TV where returning defectors complain about poor living conditions in the South and pledge allegiance to Kim Jong-un. In November 2016, North Korean website Uriminzokkiri aired an interview with three double defectors who complained that they had been treated as second-class citizens.

In 2013, a re-defector was charged by South Korea upon return. In 2016, defector Kim Ryon-hui's request to return to North Korea was denied by the South Korean government. In June 2017, Chun Hye-sung, a defector who had been a guest on several South Korean TV shows using the name Lim Ji-hyun, returned to the North. On North Korean TV, she said that she had been ill-treated and pressured into fabricating stories detrimental to North Korea. In July 2017, a man who had defected to the South and then returned to the North was arrested under the National Security Act when he entered the South again.

In 2019, South Korea deported two North Korean fishermen who tried to defect, saying that an investigation had found the men had killed 16 of their crewmates. In July 2020, North Korea reported a suspected case of COVID-19 in a man who had defected to the South and then swam to the North from Ganghwa Island. According to the South Korean Unification Ministry, there were 11 confirmed cases of defectors returning to North Korea between 2011 and 2015.

== From elsewhere ==
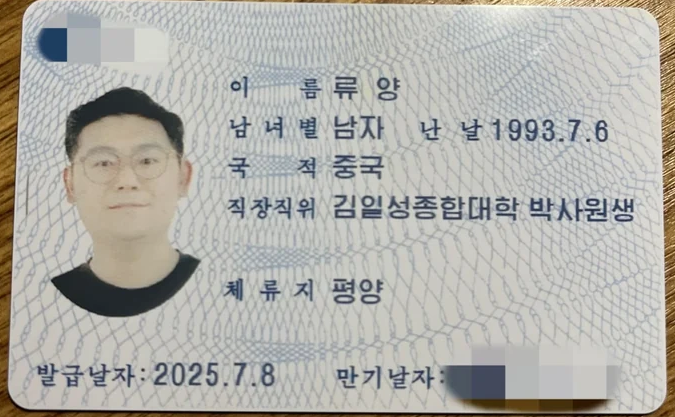
North Korean temporary residence permit, issued to Chinese citizen

The population of Japanese people in North Korea consists primarily of Japanese spouses who accompanied Zainichi Koreans to the country during Chongryon's repatriation campaign of the 1960s and 1970s. Chinese people in North Korea are largely descendants of 19th-century migrants who remained throughout Japanese rule and the liberation and division of the country, with small numbers of newer migrants who have moved to the country to pursue business opportunities.
