= Minorities in North Korea =

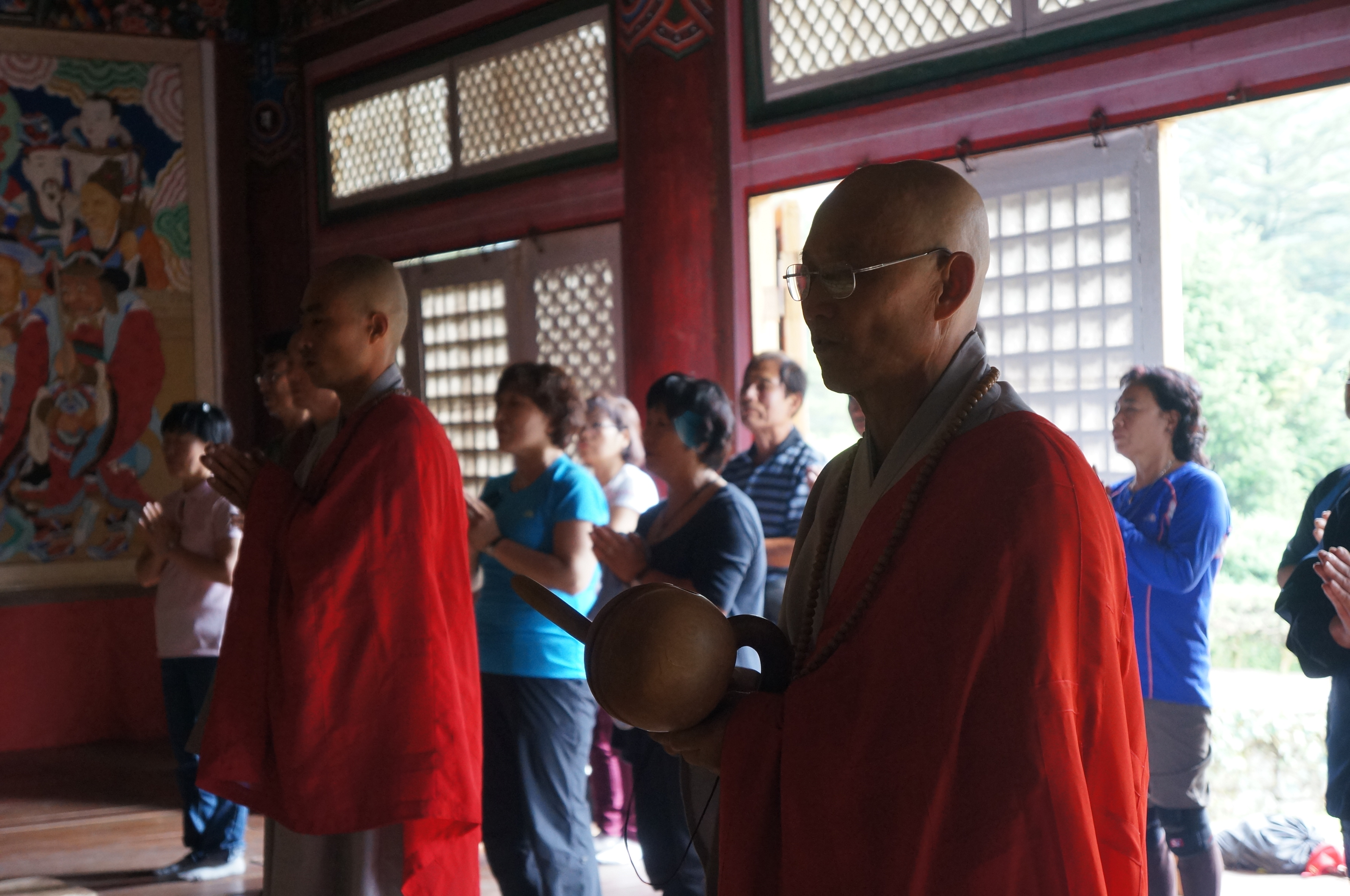
Buddhists, now a minority religious group in North Korea, being practiced (2014)

While North Korea is ethnically and linguistically homogeneous, some minorities in North Korea exist. They include groups of repatriated Koreans, small religious communities, and migrants from neighboring China and Japan.

The historical Jaegaseung ethnic group of descendants of Jurchen people used to inhabit villages of their own, under lay monastic orders, until the 1960s. These monastic communities were perceived as antisocialist and the Jaegaseung people were assimilated with the Korean people. There is also a community of ethnic Chinese people, known as huaqiao, that is in decline due to migration to China. While in the 1980s Chinese people living in North Korea enjoyed privileged access to trips abroad, today many of them have permanently moved to China. The Japanese community in North Korea has diverse origins. Former Japanese prisoners of war in the Soviet Union, Japanese spouses of repatriated Zainichi Koreans, defecting members of the Japanese Red Army, and Japanese people abducted by North Korea live in the country.

There are small communities of Indians and Americans in North Korea. Religious communities, such as Chondoists, Buddhists and Christians, exist in the country. The Chondoist are also portrayed as the embodiment of the 19th century Donghak Peasant Revolution with their Chondoist Chongu Party, a minor party closely collaborating with the ruling Workers' Party of Korea.

A number of communities consist of ethnic Koreans who have repatriated to the Korean peninsula. Some 50,000 to 70,000 ethnic Koreans living in China migrated to North Korea in the wake of the famine following Mao Zedong's Great Leap Forward and repression of ethnic minorities during the Cultural Revolution. The influx forced the North Korean government to construct refugee camps to house the immigrants. Between 100,000 and 150,000 ethnic Koreans formerly living in Japan, and their descendants, form the community of repatriated Zainichi Koreans in North Korea. Their repatriation took place between 1959 and 1980. During the 1960s and 1970s they maintained affluence from their Japanese stay, but their wealth was consumed by the North Korean famine of the 1990s. Their communities remain tight, with marriages mostly from within the group, and separate from the rest of the North Korean society. The Soviet Union had one of the largest Korean minorities abroad, but fewer than 10,000 of them have repatriated to North Korea, where they have been assimilated into the rest of the society.

== Ethnic minorities ==
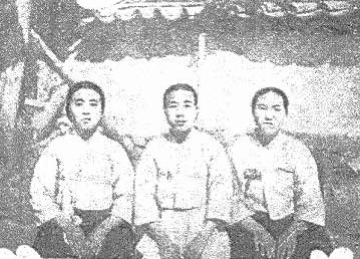
Korean women of Jaegaseung ethnicity

=== Jaegaseung people ===
Jaegaseung are Jurchen people descendants who live in Korea. Historically, they formed villages of married lay monks. They produced oatmeal paper and substituted their tax with it. These local communities survived through the colonial period without serious pressure from outside.

Their villages existed in North Korea, from the 18th century when their descendants migrated from China, until the 1960s. In modern times, Jaegaseung people have been assimilated with the Korean people in North Korea. The monastic identity of lay monks was seen as antisocialist, and the villages have ceased to exist.

=== Chinese people in North Korea ===
There is a dwindling community of Chinese people, known locally as huaqiao, in North Korea. The decline of the Chinese community is due to migration to China in the search of a better life and education. Similar trends have been observed in Chinese communities living in South Korea. In the 1980s Chinese people were uniquely privileged in North Korea by being allowed to freely make visits abroad.

=== Japanese people in North Korea ===
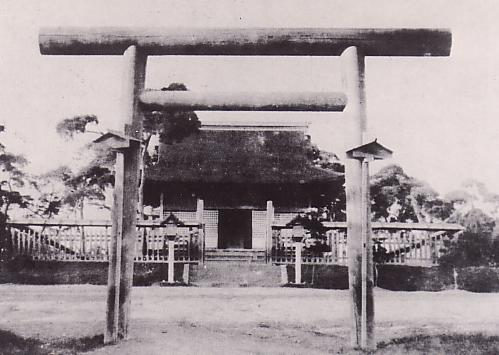
Heijō Shrine was a Shinto shrine built by Japanese in Pyongyang

Former Japanese prisoners of war in the Soviet Union, Japanese accompanying their repatriated Zainichi Korean spouses, defectors such as Japanese Red Army members, and abductees form a small Japanese community in North Korea. In 1997 a small number of ethnically Japanese wives were allowed to return to Japan.

=== Small ethnic communities ===
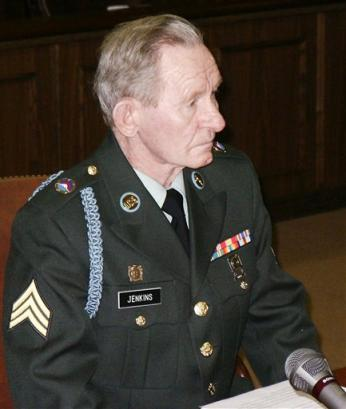
Charles Robert Jenkins was part of the American community in North Korea.

Small communities of Americans and Indians exist in North Korea. Two hundred Westerners live in North Korea and 5,000 Westerners visit the country each year.

== Repatriated groups in North Korea ==
=== Russian-Korean people ===
Fewer than 10,000 Russian-Korean people moved to North Korea, although the Soviet Union had one of the largest Korean minorities in the world. Most of the repatriates to North Korea came from island of Sakhalin where they had moved during Japanese colonization of Korea. The Russian-Koreans have mainly assimilated, and do not form a separate ethnic group in modern North Korea.

=== Chinese-Korean people ===
The community of Koreans in China grew in the late 19th century. In 1945, there were up to two million ethnic Koreans living in China. In the late 1950s and 1960s, tens of thousands of ethnic Koreans moved to North Korea. Between 50,000 and 70,000 people are believed to have moved to North Korea. However, no official published statistics exist to confirm the numbers. In the late 1950s the Great Leap Forward resulted in economic troubles and famine. In comparison, North Korean economy of that time did well. While the emigration was legal at first, it was banned after 1958. The Cultural Revolution and resulting persecution of Korean intellectuals caused them to flee to North Korea. North Korean government had to establish two or three refugee camps for the large numbers of Chinese-Korean refugees fleeing China. Since the 1960s, there have been schools for the Chinese-Koreans, but very little Chinese is taught in them.

=== Japanese-Korean people ===
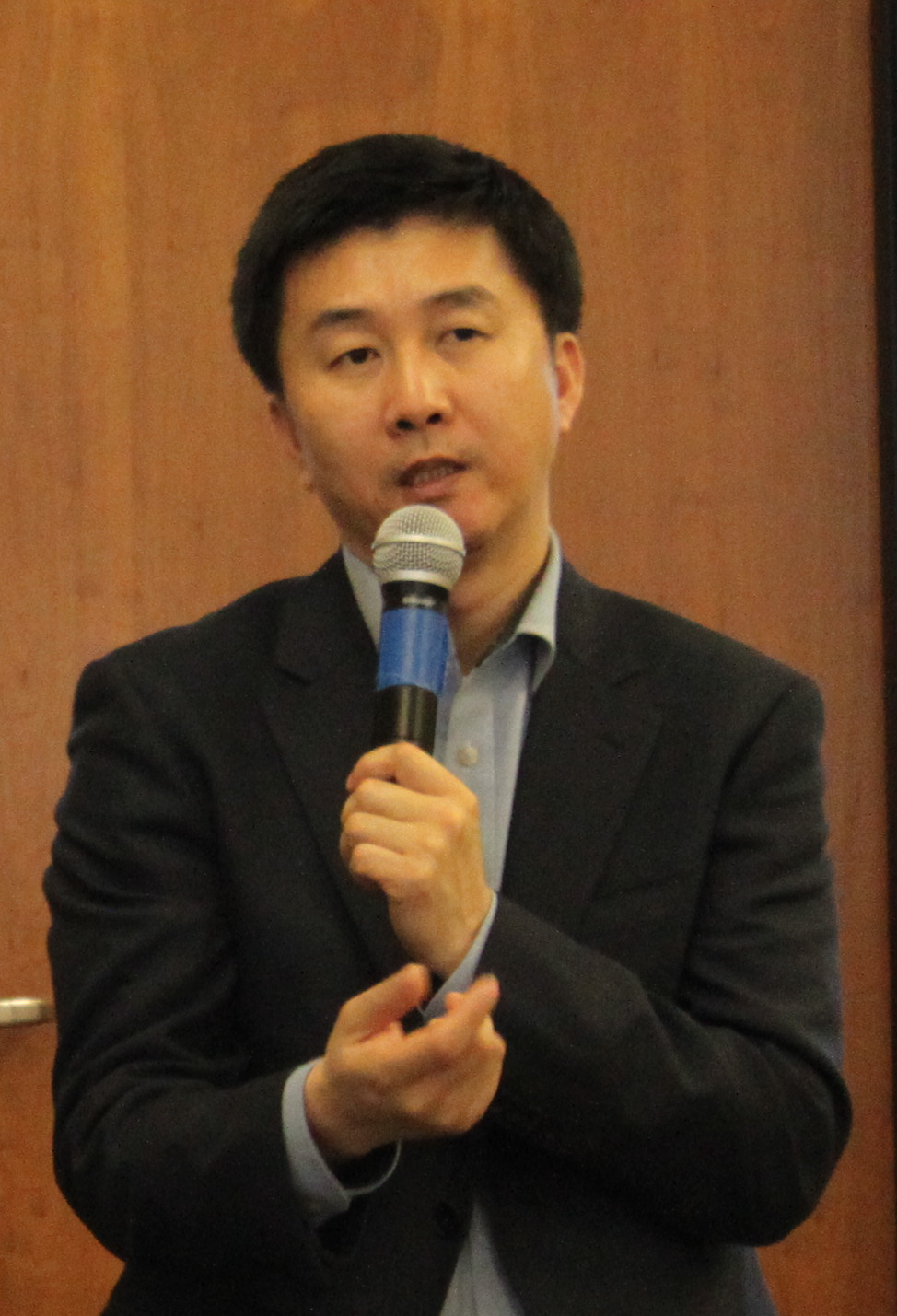
Kang Chol-hwan is a well-known member of Japanese-Korean minority.

Japanese-Koreans are descendants of people who were repatriated from Japan between 1959 and 1980. There were around 94,000 people who moved to North Korea. As of 2013 their current number is between 100,000 and 150,000. They were isolated from mainstream society in North Korea. However, they were more affluent than typical North Koreans in the 1960s and 1970s. The Japanese-Koreans are known from anecdotal evidence to have mainly married among themselves. After North Korean famine the community has lost much of its affluence but it still exists as a separate group within North Korean society.

== Religious minorities ==
Religious Intelligence UK has tried to make an unofficial estimate of religious demographics.
1. Irreligion (63.7%)
2. Korean shamanism (15.8%)
3. Chondoism (13.3%)
4. Buddhism (4.44%)
5. Christianity (1.66%)
6. Illegal Christians (1.15%)
North Korean official proportions of religious adherents. North Korea has claimed that there are only 64,000 religious people living in the country.
1. Chondoism (62.5%)
2. Buddhism (15.6%)
3. Protestantism (15.6%)
4. Catholicism (6.25%)

North Korea has no clear religious majority. It has been suggested that North Korea is mostly irreligious. However, the figures are unreliable.

Practicing religion is allowed by the government, but it is mandated to serve the official Juche ideology. For instance, the Chondoist Chongu Party is allowed to exist so that the regime is able to claim it represents ideals of the 19th century Donghak Peasant Revolution. Various religious organizations are allowed to exist in order to create an illusion of freedom of religion. The official ideology may itself be characterized as a religion. Christian and other religious minorities are persecuted.

== Minority rights in North Korea ==
There are very few rights provided to the religious minority in North Korea because they are a very small group of the huge population. Many people live there with their identities under the radar, hiding their ethnicity.

== See also ==
- Chondoist Chongu Party
- Disability in North Korea
- Foreigners in Korea
- Korean Buddhism
- LGBT rights in North Korea
- Women in North Korea
- Gyeonggi dialect
- Hamgyŏng dialect
- Pyongan dialect
