= Korean Vietnamese =

Korean Vietnamese or Vietnamese Korean may refer to:

- North Korea–Vietnam relations
- South Korea–Vietnam relations
- Multiracial people of mixed Korean and Vietnamese descent
  - Lai Daihan, persons born to South Korean soldier fathers and Vietnamese mothers during the Vietnam war
- Koreans in Vietnam
- Vietnamese people in Korea
