= Korea–Vietnam relations =

Korea–Vietnam relations may refer to:

- North Korea–Vietnam relations
- South Korea–Vietnam relations
