= South Korean Vietnamese =

South Korean Vietnamese or Vietnamese South Korean may refer to:

- Vietnamese people in South Korea
- South Koreans in Vietnam
- South Korea–Vietnam relations
- Multiracial people of South Korean and Vietnamese descent
