= Lý (Vietnamese surname) =

Vietnamese surname

- Language: Vietnamese

Origin
- Meaning: plum

Other names
- Variant forms: Lee, Li, Lí

Spelling and Pronunciation of Lý
Spelling and Pronunciation of Lý

A Vietnamese family flag based on the traditional Vietnamese five-color flags derived from the Traditional Chinese concept of "the five (5) elements" featuring the name of the Vietnamese family in Chữ Hán in the center red field of the flag.

Lý (chữ Hán: 李 [li˧˥]) is a Vietnamese surname. It is the 14th most common Vietnamese surname and is the 1176th most common American surname, according to the 2010 United States census.

== Origin ==
Traditionally, the surname Li is derived from the title Dali held by Gao Yao (Cao Dao in Vietnamese), a legendary minister of the Xia dynasty, and was originally written with a different character (理). There is a claim that Lao Tzu (Lão Tử in Vietnamese), the founder of Taoism, was named Ly Nhi (李耳). Ly Nhi is the first known historical figure with the surname and is considered the possible founding ancestor.

One of the earliest occurrences of the name Lý in Vietnam is the warrior Lý Ông Trọng, who lived around 200 BCE.

Lý Thái Tổ established the Lý dynasty (sometimes known as the Later Lý dynasty), which ruled the Vietnam from 1009 to 1225.

== People surnamed Ly ==
=== Monarchs of the Lý dynasty ===
- Lý Bí
- Lý Phật Tử
- Lý Công Uẩn
- Lý Nhân Tông
- Lý Thái Tông
- Lý Thánh Tông
- Lý Chiêu Hoàng (李佛金), empress regnant in the history of Vietnam, last sovereign of the Lý Dynasty

=== Others ===
- Lý Đạo Thành, a courtier under the Lý dynasty
- Lý Long Tường (李龍祥), prince of Lý dynasty
- Lý Thường Kiệt, Lý dynasty general
- Lý Tiến (李進), civil servant in Jiaozhi, later became Imperial adviser for Emperor Xian of Han in capital Luoyang
- Lý Trường Nhân (李長仁), local ruler of Jiaozhou recognised by Emperor Ming of Song from 468 to 485.
- Ly dynasty
- Lý Nam Đế (李賁), founder of the Early Lý dynasty of Vietnam
- Lý Thái Tổ (李公蘊), founder of the Lý dynasty of Vietnam and founder of Hanoi in 1010

== See also ==
- Lee (Korean surname)
- Hwasan Lee clan
- Li (surname)
