= LDH =

LDH is an acronym which may refer to:

== Science and technology ==
- Lactate dehydrogenase, an enzyme
- Large-diameter hose, a fire hose
- Layered double hydroxides, a material
- The Letters Digits Hyphen rule of the Internet Domain Name System standards

== Other Uses ==
- LDH (company), a Japanese talent management firm
- Lai Đại Hàn, mixed-race children of the Vietnam War
- Lord Howe Island Airport, Australia (IATA:LDH)
- Louisiana Department of Health
- Human Rights League (France) (French: Ligue des droits de l'homme)
