= Indonesia–South Korea relations =

- Indonesia: South Korea

Diplomatic mission
- Embassy of Indonesia, Seoul: Korean Embassy, Jakarta

Envoy
- Ambassador Cecep Herawan: Ambassador Yoon Soon-gu

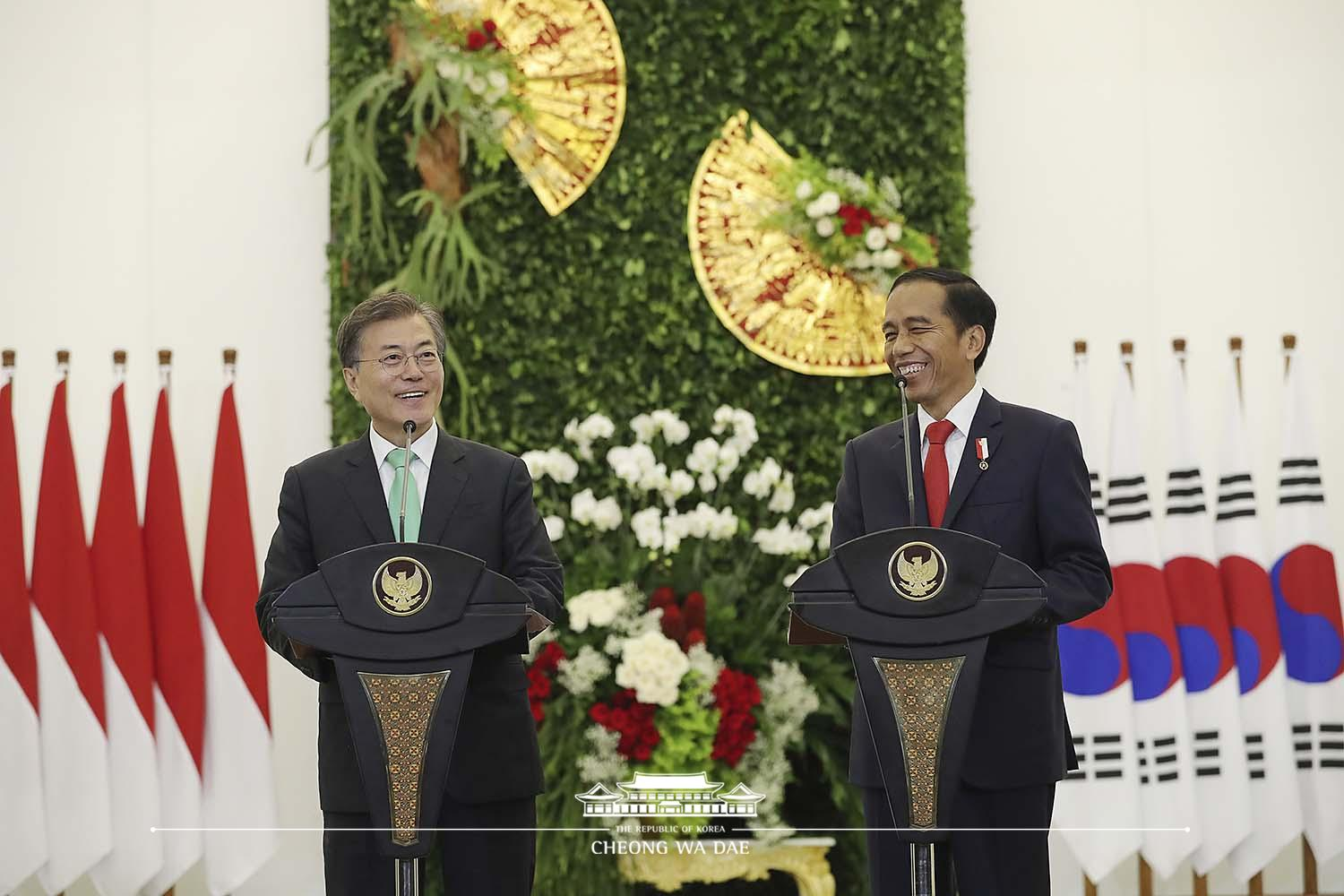
South Korean President Moon Jae-in (left) with Indonesia President Joko Widodo (right), November 2017.

Indonesia and South Korea established diplomatic relations on 18 September 1973. Both countries share a common vision, values and the will to contribute to the international community as middle powers. Both countries are members of G-20 and APEC. South Korea has an embassy in Jakarta and Indonesia has an embassy in Seoul. According to a 2014 BBC World Service Poll, 48% of Indonesians view South Korea's influence positively, with 27% expressing a negative view. The Chinese Indonesian merchant Chen Yanxiang visited Korea between the 1390s and the 1410s, the first major contact between the two nations.

== Military cooperation ==
Fast growing trade and investment enabled the two governments to agree on a strategic partnership in 2006. Indonesia and South Korea have invested in multiple joint military development projects, including the KFX/IFX fighter jet. South Korean firm Daewoo Shipbuilding and Marine Engineering (DSME) is in final contract negotiations to supply Indonesia with three Type-209 submarines. This will be the largest ever bilateral defense deal, valued at US$1.1 billion.

== Residents ==
In 2012, there were about 38,000 Indonesian citizens living in South Korea.

== Economy and trade ==
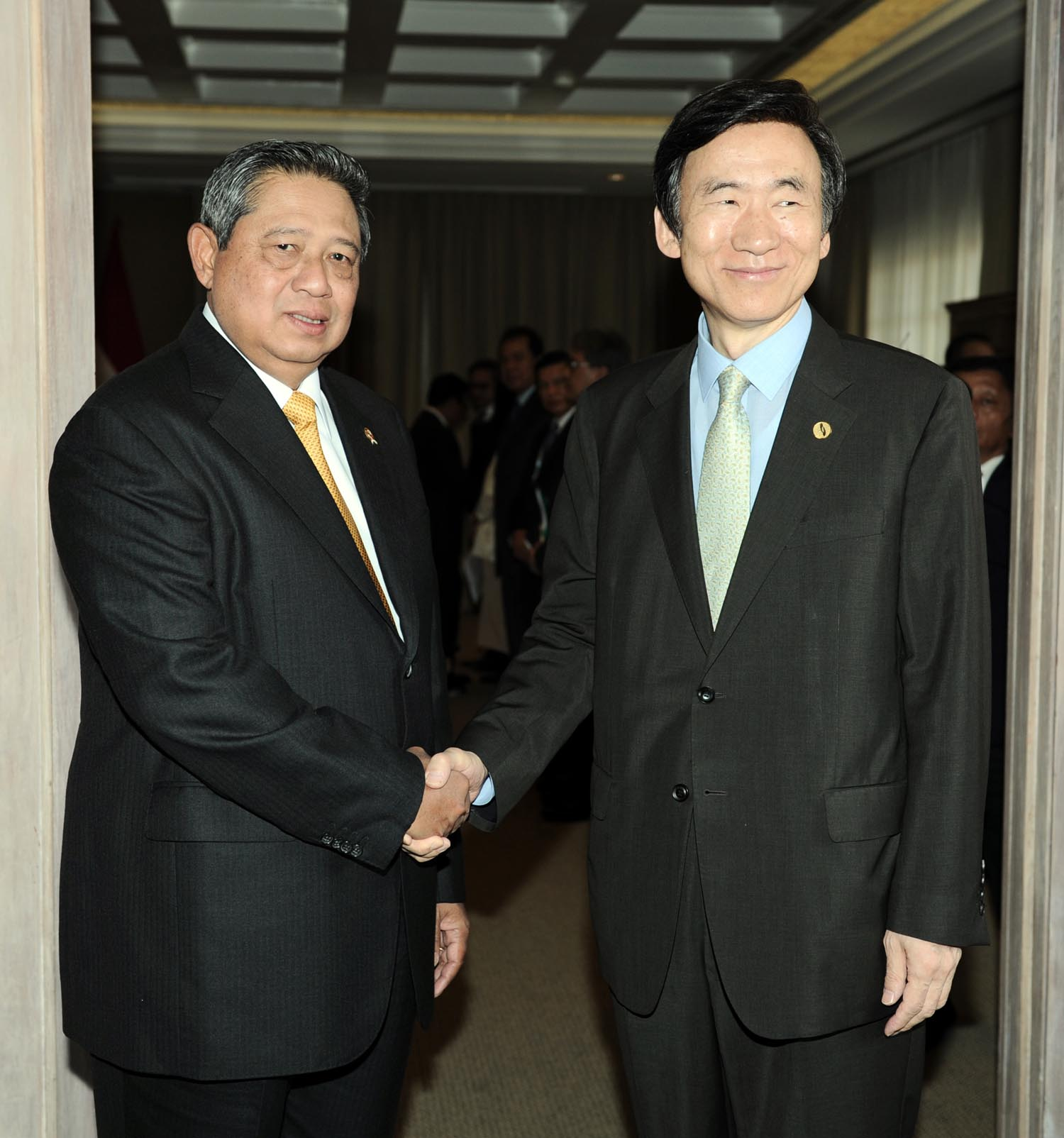
President Yudhoyono of Indonesia with South Korean minister for foreign affairs, Yun Byung-se in Bali, June 14th, 2013.

In the past, the relations were only developed around trade and investments, such as the forestry and garment sectors. Today the cooperation has been expanded to a number of mega projects and advanced industries. With US$27 billion in bilateral trade, South Korea became the fourth biggest trading partner of Indonesia in 2012. It became the third-biggest foreign investor in Indonesia, with US$1.94 billion in investment.

There are large numbers of South Korean companies that have been investing and operating in Indonesia, such as Miwon (Daesang Corporation), Lotte, Yong Ma, Hankook, Samsung, LG, Kia and Hyundai. In 2011, Hankook announced a US$353 million investment into a production plant located in Bekasi, West Java, Indonesia.

In 2019, trade between Indonesia and South Korea was worth $15.65 billion, and between 2015 and 2019 South Korean companies invested nearly $7 billion in Indonesia. In December 2020, Indonesia and South Korea signed the Indonesia–Korea Comprehensive Economic Partnership Agreement. It is equivalent to a free trade agreement, though focuses on a broader scope of economic cooperation. Under the deal, Indonesia will scrap 94.8% of tariffs on South Korean products while South Korea will scrap 95.8% of tariffs on Indonesian products. In May 2023, the central banks of South Korea and Indonesia signed a memorandum of understanding to promote bilateral trade in national currencies, moving away from the US dollar as an intermediary. They said in a joint statement that the step is expected to help South Korean and Indonesian corporations to lower transaction costs and exposure to exchange rate risks.

Korea and Indonesia have been engaged in a variety of public diplomacy, with exchanges between local governments being the first. Local government public diplomacy, which began in 1961, increased rapidly in the 2000s, centered on friendly exchange projects, and entered a maturity period through the Park Geun Hyen government, which established customized public diplomacy projects there, the Moon Jae Inn government, which enacted the Public Diplomacy Act, and the Moon Jae Inn government, which sought to harmonize autonomy and international cooperation.

Korean companies' investment and expansion in Indonesia also began in the 1960s, and it is encouraging that more Korean companies are gradually fulfilling their responsibilities as members of Indonesian society, free from the economic motives of cost reduction and market development. However, it is necessary to investigate how much Korean companies can respond to sensitive issues such as climate change and carbon neutrality that the Indonesian government is interested in.

== Culture ==
Popular South Korean culture are well known in Indonesia, which include Korean dramas and K-pop. K-pop has become a thing among Indonesian people since the second generation of Kpop. Numerous K-pop performances, such as SMTown Live World Tour III and Music Bank World Tour, have been performed in Indonesia. The first K-pop concert in Indonesia was held in 2010 during Indonesia-Korea Week, where the group that attended was SHINee. Seeing the potential and enthusiasm of fans at that time, SM Entertainment brought back their artists 2 years later, in 2012 SMTown Concert succeeded filling Gelora Bung Karno in Jakarta with 50,000 people.

Among the top 10 most searched songs by Indonesians in 2020, three were Korean singers, and Korean dramas, including "Squid Game" and "Wise Doctor Life," were also very popular. In addition, according to the Indonesian Business Center of the Korea Creative Content Agency, Korean food culture, including ramen, chicken, and tteokbokki, has already become part of Indonesians' daily lives. In response, the Korean Cultural Center in Indonesia, along with the Korean Embassy and the Korean Association, visited five major cities in Java in 2019 by food trucks Jawa, a Korean friend, came to Java). In addition, the concert, co-hosted by the Western Java government and the Korean Association in 2022, was highly praised by the governor and leading presidential candidate Ganjar Pranowo (Baskhara 2022).

The Korea Tourism Organization, or KTO, office was opened by the Indonesian government in Jakarta to promote bilateral collaboration and facilitate Indonesians' access to information about South Korea. It's in Central Jakarta, specifically in Sudirman. Whilst the Office of the Korean Cultural Centre, located in Senayan, South Jakarta, was likewise founded by the South Korean government. The Korean Culture Centre was officially opened and launched by South Korean Ambassador to Indonesia Kim Young-sun. He also noted that the building of the KCC was a reaction to Indonesians' strong interest in Hallyu.

Indonesian volleyball player Megawati Pertiwi, gained notoriety for playing in JKJ Red Sparks women's team from 2024 to 2025.

== State visits ==
President Chun Doo Hwan visited Indonesia in July 1981, and in the next year President Soeharto visited South Korea in October 1982. In November 1988 President Roh Tae Woo visited Indonesia. President Kim Young Sam visited Indonesia in November 1994. Indonesian President Abdurrahman Wahid visited South Korea twice in 2000, on February and on October, and in the same year, President Kim Dae Jung visited Indonesia in November. President Megawati Soekarnoputri visited South Korea in March 2002.

President Susilo Bambang Yudhoyono visited South Korea during an APEC Summit in November 2005. In December 2006, President Roh Moo Hyun visited Indonesia to sign a Joint Strategic Partnership between Indonesia and South Korea. President Yudhoyono visited Korea as a state guest in March 2012 and President Lee Myung-bak visited Bali to attend the Bali Democracy Forum in November 2012.

The first lady of South Korea, Kim-Keon-hee visited the Korean Embassy in Jakarta, Indonesia in September 2023. She shows her support for the Indonesian efforts to promote Korean Culture that related to Hallyu. The attendees received souvenirs as gifts from her supporting Busan's bid to host the 2023 World Expo.

President Prabowo Subianto visited South Korea from 31 March to 2 April 2026. He and President Lee Jae Myung agreed to raise bilateral ties to a 'special comprehensive strategic partnership' and boost resource and security cooperation in response to the 2026 Strait of Hormuz crisis. In order to improve economic communication, nuclear power cooperation, renewable energy, and vital mineral cooperation, the two nations signed sixteen memoranda of understanding (MOUs). In recognition of President Prabowo's efforts to foster cordial ties between the two nations, President Lee granted him the Grand Order of Mugunghwa.

== See also ==
- Koreans in Indonesia
- Indonesians in South Korea
- Korea-Indonesia Peace Park
