= Lê Thiết Hùng =

Vietnamese major general, spy and politician

Major General Lê Thiết Hùng
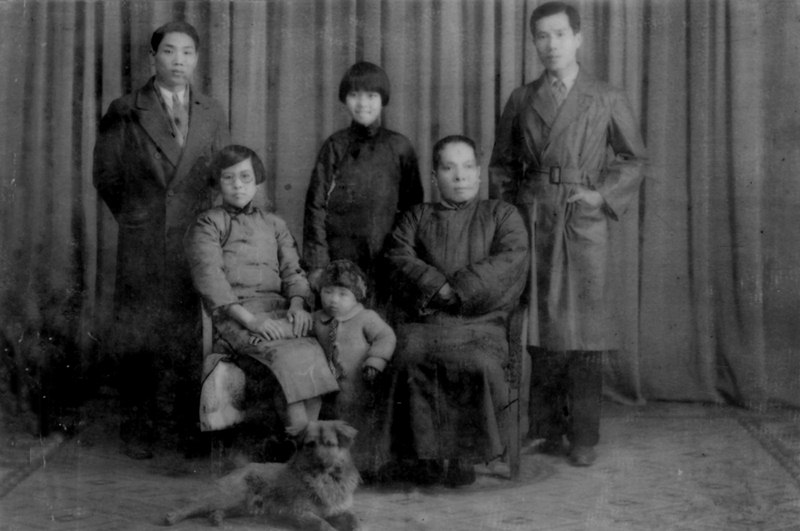
- Lê Thiết Hùng (outermost left, second row) with Hồ Học Lãm's family in China, 1933.

Deputy Director of the International Department Central Committee of the Communist Party
- In office 1970–1976
- Secretary: Lê Duẩn

Deputy Director of CP48 Central Military Commission
- In office 1970–1976
- Secretary: Võ Nguyên Giáp

2nd Vietnamese Ambassador to North Korea
- In office 31 August 1963 – 18 February 1970
- Minister: Xuân Thủy (1963 - 1965); Nguyễn Duy Trinh (1965 - 1970)
- Preceded by: Trần Xuân Độ
- Succeeded by: Bùi Đình Đổng

Personal details
- Born: Lê Văn Nghiệm; 13 August 1908 Hưng Nguyên, Nghệ An, Annam, French Indochina
- Died: January 26, 1986 (aged 77) Hà Nội, Socialist Republic of Vietnam
- Party: Communist Party of Vietnam; Chinese Communist Party (since 1931)
- Spouse(s): Hồ Diệc Lan (1936-1947; her death); Nguyễn Tuyết Mai (1948 - 1986; his death)
- Children: Lê Mai Hương
- Education: Whampoa Military Academy
- Nickname(s): "Ebony", Sửu, Lê Như Vọng, Lê Đinh, Lê Tân Dân, Lê Quốc Vọng, Lê Trị Hoàn

Military service
- Allegiance: Communist China; Democratic Republic of Vietnam and later Vietnam
- Branch/service: National Revolutionary Army (North Vietnam) People's Army of Vietnam
- Years of service: 1928-1963
- Rank: Colonel (NRA) (Note: According to his own memoirs.); Major General (Vietnam)
- Commands: Anti-Air Command Post; Artillery Forces; Bắc Kạn-Tuyên Quang Front; Takeover & Defense Force; War Zone 4
- Battles/wars: Encirclement Campaigns; Second Sino-Japanese War; August Revolution; First Indochina War; Operation Léa; Battle of Điện Biên Phủ
- Other military offices held: 1957–1961: Dean, Artillery Officers University; 1956–1957: Head, Artillery Department, the Vietnamese Army University; 1956–1963: Commander, Anti-Air Command Post; 1956–1963: Commander, Artillery Forces; 1954–1956: Commander, Artillery Command; Central institution membership: 1954: Điện Biên Phủ Campaign Command; 1950–1954: Central Military Commission

Lê Thiết Hùng (13 August 1908 – 26 January 1986), born Lê Văn Nghiệm, was a Major General in the People's Army of Vietnam (PAVN) active during the First Indochina War and an intelligence agent. He was the first commander of PAVN artillery forces and the first general officer ever appointed in the PAVN, preceding even the implementation of the rank system.

== Early revolutionary career ==
In 1923, Lê Thiết Hùng went to Thailand for revolutionary activities with his direct relative Lê Hồng Phong, Phạm Hồng Thái and Trương Văn Lĩnh. In 1924, he moved to Guangzhou and was chosen to join the Vietnamese Revolutionary Youth League by Nguyễn Ái Quốc. In 1925, Lê Thiết Hùng, Lê Hồng Phong and 12 other comrades were sent to study at the Whampoa Military Academy.

After graduating from the academy's infantry class, Hùng was designated as a platoon commander in the National Revolutionary Army, where he acted as a "mole" for the Chinese Reds. In the Second Sino-Japanese War, he rose to command a transportation battalion (Note: Potentially under the auspices of the then Transportation Police Headquarters of the Ministry of Transportation of the Republic of China.) operating on the Gan-Xiang-Gui route, from which it became possible to smuggle weapons and medicine to the Eighth Route Army. His rank was raised to Colonel and he became the dean of a training school for armored vehicle and transport vehicle drivers, as well as technical troops. It was during this time that Hùng took the opportunity to learn how to operate and master the mechanical principles of various types of armored vehicles.

Vietnamese news outlets reported that Nguyễn Ái Quốc himself cultivated Lê Thiết Hùng to act as an "underground worker" from within Jiang Jieshi's army.

== Return to Vietnam ==
In October 1941, Lê Thiết Hùng, together with Lê Quảng Ba formed the Pác Bó guerrilla team - the second armed group of Việt Minh. In a solemn ceremony held at a large rice field called Pài Co Nhản in Pác Bó village (now Trường Hà commune, Hà Quảng district, Cao Bằng), Ba was appointed commander of the force, Hoàng Sâm his deputy, while Hùng was made political commissar. Aside from this responsibility, Lê Thiết Hùng carried out the duty of a Dean for an "underground" Military & Political School in Cao Bằng.

In the lead-up to the August Revolution in 1945, Việt Minh groups under his leadership seized control of local government seats at the communes of Thất Khê, Đồng Đăng, Na Sầm in Lạng Sơn. At the outset of Operation Bright Moon, this objective was completed.

During the temporary Chinese occupation, he moved to Hải Phòng with the aim of "cultivating self-defense forces and preparing to implement the people's war doctrine."

While inspecting the western areas of War Zone 4 to counter remnants of the French army that were threatening to attack from Laos, he received a telegram from Chairman Hồ Chí Minh summoning him to Hà Nội. Upon returning to the capital, he learned that the government had just organized a "Takeover & Defense Force" (Note: Vietnamese: Quân Tiếp phòng) to replace Nationalist Chinese troops in their former positions and oversee their withdrawal. At this time, the government needed a Major General to command this provisional force. After careful consideration, Hồ and the Central Party Standing Committee decided to choose Hùng as Commander-in-Chief.

In a private meeting, Hùng turned down the appointment, citing his lack of knowledge regarding the French. Hồ reaffirmed his previous stance, specifying that this is a decision by consensus and mentioned Hùng's years of lurking among the Nationalist Chinese forces to encourage him. He relented and was given the pseudonym of Lê Thiết Hùng.

== Indochina War ==
During the First Indochina War, Lê Thiết Hùng was assigned to command War Zone 4 from October 1945 to March 1946, then commander of PAVN artillery force from 1954 to 1956.

On 23 July 1951, the CIA reported that North Vietnamese military figures:

[Including] general Chu Văn Tấn, [...], Lê Thiết Hùng and Phan Tử Lăng, (Note: Promoted to Senior Colonel in 1948.) accompanied by about ten colonels, moved from the Việt Bắc Intersector to Intersector IV (Note: Another name for the "Bình-Trị-Thiên Front" named in the file, which will become a more popular concept during the Vietnam War.) in early July. Prior to their departure, the DRV spread a false rumor stating that these individuals had been reassigned to South Vietnam.

The same file claimed that "Chinese Communist general Chen Yi (Note: Named in the file by his Vietnamese transliteration, "Trần Nghị".) will act as advisor to DRV forces on this front." A report sent to the CIA on 2 February 1952 named Hùng as "member of the Military Inspection Staff and Head of the Military Signs Bureau." By this point, he had been serving as Inspector General of the National Army by decree for more than 4 years, and had in fact been acting Inspector since 1947. In this capacity, Lê Thiết Hùng chaired the meeting which initiated the famous anti-graft investigation against the Director of Ordnance, Colonel Trần Dụ Châu. Present in this secret conference was Hùng's future superior, Xuân Thủy. An unsubstantiated claim placed Hùng as a major player in cracking an unspecified "faux espionage case".

Under the guise of a Chinese People's Liberation Army officer, he twice headed the secretive Vietnamese Army Academy located in Kunming, named the "Intermediate Military & Political Training School" at the time. A CIA report on 6 May 1954 noted Lê Thiết Hùng as chief of a "Military Cadre Training Department", (Note: An older name for the "Intermediate Military & Political Training School" was the "Intermediate Military Cadre Training School".) potentially referring to the school using its former name.

== Later life ==
He retired to civilian life in 1963 and was made Ambassador Extraordinaire and Plenipotentiary to North Korea, where he would serve for 7 years before being replaced by Bùi Đình Đổng. Hùng was assigned the posts of deputy director of CP48, (Note: Vietnamese: Ban Công tác Campuchia; English: Department for Cambodian Affairs. According to this source, operational files of CP48 is kept at the Party Central Committee Historical Archives as "File no. 33".) where he likely served for the next 6 years, and of the International Department for the Central Committee of the Communist Party, headed by Xuân Thuỷ.

Lê Thiết Hùng passed away on 26 January 1986, and was buried in the Mai Dịch Cemetery.

== Dates of rank ==
Lê Thiết Hùng's dates of rank were:

Insignia	Rank	Component	Date
No pin insignia for Major General in 1946	Brevet Major General	Takeover & Defense Force	24 September 1946
	Major General	Ground Force	7 July 1948

== See also ==
- Central Committee of the Communist Party of Vietnam
- Central Military Commission (Vietnam)
- Hồ Chí Minh
- Lê Hồng Phong (Note: Some sources noted this fellow townsman with the same surname as a direct cousin or uncle of Hùng.)
- Võ Nguyên Giáp
- Lê Duẩn
- Xuân Thủy
- Trần Dụ Châu
- Vietnam-North Korea relations
- Vietnam-Cambodia relations
