= Rape during the Vietnam War =

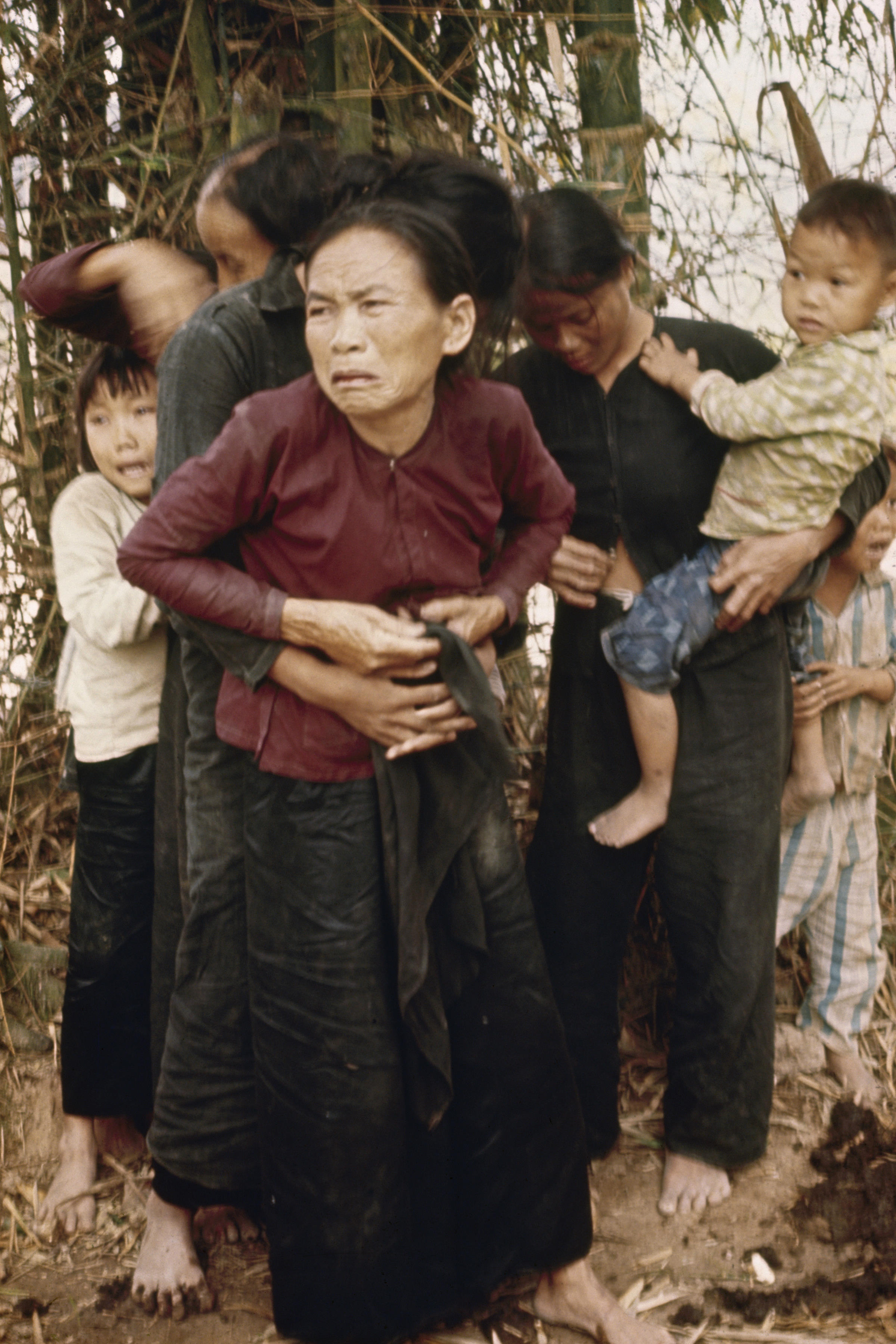
Photograph taken by Ronald L. Haeberle of South Vietnamese women and children in Mỹ Lai before being killed in the massacre. According to Haeberle, soldiers had attempted to rip the blouse off the woman in the back while her mother, in the front of the photo, tried to protect her.

Rape, among other acts of wartime sexual violence, was frequently committed against female Vietnamese civilians during the Vietnam War. It was an aspect of the various human rights abuses perpetrated by the United States and South Korea, as well as by local Vietnamese combatants. According to American political scientist Elisabeth Jean Wood, the sexual violation of women by American military personnel was tolerated by their commanders. American professor Gina Marie Weaver stated that not only were documented crimes against Vietnamese women by American soldiers ignored during the international legal discourse that occurred immediately after the conflict, but modern feminists and other anti-war rape campaigners, as well as historians, have continued to dismiss them.

Some American veterans believe that sexual violence against Vietnamese women was motivated by "racism, sexism, or a combination of both" as a result of the strong social reform movements that were roiling the United States in the early 1970s. According to one source, only 25 cases of rape from the United States Army and 16 cases of rape from the United States Marine Corps resulted in court-martial convictions involving Vietnamese victims between 1965 and 1973.

The issue of pregnancies resulting from rapes has had a significant impact on South Korea–Vietnam relations: these people, conceived through the rape of Vietnamese women by South Korean soldiers, continue to be subjected to discriminatory treatment by the Vietnamese government, while their presence in South Korea is unacknowledged by the South Korean government. In Vietnam, the term "Lai Đại Hàn" ([laːi ɗâˀi hâːn]) refers to a person beget by a Vietnamese mother and a South Korean father during the Vietnam War. The extent of these relationships' sexual consent is still debated; one Japanese study determined that over half of Lai Đại Hàn births had resulted from rape.

== By American personnel ==
During the Vietnam War, U.S. soldiers stationed in South Vietnam engaged in various sexual interactions, including consensual sex, prostitution, and rape. Mixing consenting sexual activity and rape may also be viewed as the outcome of indifference toward a nation at war. According to Gregory A. Daddis, certain U.S. Army drill instructors assured recruits that they could rape Vietnamese women, which Daddis partially attributed to "Orientalist" beliefs that portrayed Asian women as "creatures of a male power fantasy." Men's adventure magazines contributed to a culture that accepted sexual aggressiveness and violence towards Vietnamese women.

According to Gina Marie Weaver, the primary sources are rich in accounts of violence, including testimony provided in open hearings held during the war, court cases, military investigations, oral reports gathered for publishing both during and long after the war, and literary works, such as poems, novels, and memoirs. Sexual mistreatment of the Vietnamese women during the Vietnam war has been witnessed by numerous U.S. veterans and other eyewitnesses.

According to Kerry Crawford, rape of Vietnamese women was a "normal operating procedure", and brothels were built inside military installations to maintain morale and discipline. Approximately 100 recruits who were interviewed in Cam Ranh Bay, Vietnam, had little to say about the war's greater difficulties since "the men’s personal concerns were mostly sexual." Many U.S. servicemen sought local women in hopes of filling the void created by the frustrating war in Vietnam. According to Daddis, military leaders were likely aware of this, as one deployed officer noted that his in-processing briefings covered topics ranging "from the current Viet Cong infrastructure to the common venereal diseases in Vietnam." A U.S. soldier in Vietnam reportedly said:

They are in all-male environment...There are women available. Those women are of another culture, another colour, another society...You've got an M-16. What do you need to pay a lady for? You go down to the village and you take what you want.

During the Winter Soldier Investigation, sponsored by Vietnam Veterans Against the War (VVAW), some of the testimonies of Vietnam veterans included the rape and murder of Vietnamese women, with some being tortured and sexually mutilated. According to Mark Baker, who interviewed Vietnam veterans for his book, one became a "double veteran" by "having sex with a woman and then killing her." One marine recalled an incident where a Vietnamese girl was gang-raped by members of his unit, with the final perpetrator shooting the victim in the head. In a similar incident, a soldier observed that the female victim "freely submitted" to rape to avoid death. At a hospital in Da Nang, a nurse was killed after being raped by seven marines.

In his controversial study The Perfect War: The War We Couldn't Lose and How We Did, James William Gibson contends that raping women was a means by which some soldiers could demonstrate their power over Vietnamese women. According to Gibson, U.S. soldiers would rape Vietnamese girls, then kill them in horrific ways, including allegedly making their "stomachs explode" by sticking "hand flares" inside their vaginas.

=== Prosecutions and notable cases ===
According to one source, only 25 cases of rape committed by army soldiers and 16 by marines involving Vietnamese victims from 1965 to 1973 resulted in court-martial convictions. Daddis argues that the low number of complaints and convictions reported by the UCMJ, the only service that keeps track of its war crimes cases, demonstrates the faults in the UCMJ system.

The incident on Hill 192 refers to the kidnapping, gang rape, and murder of Phan Thi Mao, a young Vietnamese woman by an American squad during the Vietnam War on 19 November 1966. The woman was raped by the soldiers, after which she was stabbed and shot in the head. All soldiers involved faced court sentences and were also dishonorably discharged from the Army. The Mỹ Lai massacre is another infamous incident where almost 20 Vietnamese women and girls, some as young as 13, were raped by the U.S. troops.

In August 1967, a 13-year-old Vietnamese girl was raped by an American MI interrogator of the 196th Infantry Brigade while interrogating her as a suspected VC member. A general court martial tried the soldier, and he was given a dishonorable discharge and 20 years in prison with hard labor. However, his sentence was reduced to one year upon appeal. In total, he was incarcerated for only seven months and 16 days.

According to Daddis, the UCMJ system discriminated against Vietnamese rights in favor of American rights. The court system did not protect local women or listen to their stories. For example, military officials detained a 20-year-old Vietnamese woman who later alleged that 10 American soldiers raped her while she was jailed. The woman could only identify two of her rapists when questioned by investigators. Later, she stated that "she was not sure," and the case was swiftly dismissed due to a lack of sufficient evidence to support her assertions.

== By South Korean personnel ==
Approximately 320,000 South Korean soldiers served while fighting in the Vietnam War, with each typically serving a one-year tour of duty. Maximum troop levels peaked at 50,000 in 1968, with all being withdrawn by 1973. Rapes of Vietnamese women by South Korean military personnel occurred throughout the conflict, some of which resulted in forced pregnancies. According to Kim Nak-yeong, who was a staff sergeant at Bình Khê in Bình Định Province, South Vietnam, from May 1971 to June 1972, "Some of the units didn't cause any problems because they were strictly instructed not to harm civilians. However, I heard a lot of talk about brutal sexual assaults taking place throughout the operation zones, and my understanding is that there's a definite possibility it was true." The same article from The Hankyoreh in April 2015 also reported quotes from the interviews of ten elderly Vietnamese women who said they were victims of sexual assaults perpetrated by the South Korean military during the Vietnam War in Bình Định Province. One stated, "Four people took turns doing it to me one at a time." Another was quoted as saying, "They'd put one person at a time in the trench, keep me there all day and night and just rape me again and again".

In October 2016, it was reported that the head of the Vietnam Veterans' Association of Korea was representing 831 plaintiffs in a defamation lawsuit against Ku Su-jeong for her 2014 interview in the Japanese newspaper Shūkan Bunshun and 2016 interview in The Hankyoreh, as well as her statements in a video. They said that Ku's statements of about the actions of the South Korean military during the Vietnam War were all "falsehoods and forgeries", that the victims were just "Viet Cong disguised as civilians", and that "no sexual violence occurred".

=== Lai Đại Hàn ===
In Vietnamese, "Lai Dai Han" is a derogatory epithet that means "mixed blood." The Vietnamese-Korean children contend their lives have been wrecked by shame in a culture that has not recognized them or their mothers' sexual abuse. Many are illiterate as a result of being denied an education, and they have limited access to healthcare and social services. The exact number of Lai Dai Han is unknown. According to Busan Ilbo, there are at least 5,000 and as many as 30,000. According to Maeil Business, however, there are 1,000 at least. A 1998 paper which was cited in a 2015 paper said that the South Korean government put the number of Lai Dai Han at 1,500.

The Lai Dai Han community continues to face social exclusion due to their mixed ethnicity. It has been reported that many cannot read or write, with most not having access to basic health or education services. In addition to living with "stigma, shame and prejudice", the community also faces acute poverty as of 2020. A 27 March 2020, article in BBC News details some testimonies of the women of the Lai Dai Han community, who reported that their children "have faced a lifetime of abuse and discrimination, mocked for being Lai Dai Han". One rape victim's father was beaten to death by Vietnamese government personnel shortly after the war ended. Both the Korean and Vietnamese governments have sidelined or ignored the issue, and requests by the BBC to make a documentary were turned down by the Vietnamese government.

South Korea has never recognized allegations of sexual assault by its forces against Vietnamese women and girls (some as young as 12 years old) or the children conceived as a result. Justice for Lai Dai Han (JLDH) is a campaign group that is seeking recognition from South Korea for both the children born as a consequence of rape by Korean troops and their mothers. According to JLDH, tens of thousands of children were born as a consequence of rape by Korean troops, with roughly 800 mothers still living today. Vietnamese women raped by South Korean personnel during the war continue to seek reparations. On 19 October 2015, a petition with close to 29,000 signatures asked South Korean president Park Geun-hye for a formal apology from the South Korean government for the systematic rape and sexual assault perpetrated by South Korean soldiers during the war. According to Nadia Murad, winner of the 2019 Nobel Peace Prize, the Lai Dai Han have long been marginalized in Vietnamese society. She went on by saying that as we collaborate to seek justice, the victims and their families deserve to be acknowledged. Also in 2019, former British Foreign Secretary Jack Straw asked the United Nations Human Rights Council to launch a comprehensive inquiry into sexual abuse during the Vietnam War, and has urged South Korea "to confront a murky period in its past."

== Academic commentary ==
According to Gina Marie Weaver in her book Ideologies of Forgetting Rape in the Vietnam War, the role of rape in the Vietnam War has been omitted from the narratives and the impact of war on women has altered considerably because war in the twentieth and twenty-first century has evolved into total war. Weaver argues that the United States' replacing of the national conversation about the war onto "the medical and psychological issues of the Vietnam veteran" has suppressed the traumas experienced by "the truest victims of the Vietnam war—Vietnamese civilians, namely, women." Weaver argues that by acknowledging the atrocities committed by the U.S. soldiers in Vietnam, the American's ability to view the veteran as a victim would be "mitigated" or possibly "destroyed". Weaver stated that not only were documented crimes against Vietnamese women by United States military personnel ignored in the international legal discourse immediately after the war, but modern feminists and other anti-war rape campaigners, as well as historians, have continued to dismiss them.

According to Daddis, gang rapes were common throughout the war, allegedly because United States military personnel implemented a "systematic, purposeful command policy of violence" against the Vietnamese people. Numerous personnel viewed both consensual sex and forced rape as time-honored results of the battle, either as "just rewards" or as "collateral damage."

According to Gina Marie Weaver, the primary sources are rich in accounts of violence, including testimony provided in open hearings held during the war, court cases, military investigations, oral reports gathered for publishing both during and long after the war, and literary works, such as poems, novels, and memoirs. Additionally, Weaver argues that American discourse around the Vietnam War has largely encompassed only American experiences and the cost to America. There are primary sources from Vietnamese women on their sexual abuse, but due to the nature of the abuse, it is harder to talk about due to its "deeply private nature". Weaver concludes that "true healing" occurs when the public listens to the victims of the war, and become involved in the recovery of Vietnam.

== Prevalence in media ==
According to Mark Heberle, despite the fact that the violence of war is typically depicted in its entirety, with violent battles and atrocities done by all sides, rape and sexual violence are frequently avoided and in some cases purposefully omitted from the majority of films. Although veterans have long given testimony to such crimes, Hollywood war productions have altered or omitted veteran accounts in such a way as to deny their existence or imply that they were the work of deviants instead of typical soldiers. In South Korea, analyses of these works which problematize contentious Vietnam War recollections show "aesthetic, ethical, and political" restrictions and opportunities for depicting memories of sexual abuse and (un)conditional apologies during wartime in visual art.

Incident on Hill 192 is covered in a book by Daniel Lang. The 1970 film o.k. by Michael Verhoeven was based on the same incident. The 1989 film Casualties of War was based on Lang's book and directed by Brian De Palma. De Palma's film contains scenes that do not appear in Lang's account of the incident. These sequences include a scene in which the men witness the death of their favorite friend at the hands of VC forces and a scene in which it is implied that these soldiers would not have planned to kidnap and rape a Vietnamese girl if they were permitted to vent their "anger, aggression, and sexual needs on prostitutes". Furthermore, Peter Conolly-Smith argues that through using a bystander as the viewer of the sexual violence, the film absolves itself of responsibility, allowing a graphic reenactment of the act. This leads to the conclusion that sexual violence in combat films prospers through a "confirmation (however critically it may be articulated) of American hegemony" that is achieved through the domination and subjugation of people, and particularly women, of colour.

In her memoir When Heaven and Earth Changed Places, Le Ly Hayslip wrote about her experience of being raped by Viet Cong soldiers when she was fourteen years old. The 1993 Oliver Stone film Heaven & Earth was based on her memoir. The books Between Heaven and Earth by Le Ly Hayslip and Then the Americans Came by Martha Hess are said by Elisabeth Wood to provide a voice to women who were sexually abused during the war.

In the book Against Our Will by Brownmiller, her chapter on war offers a thirty-page investigation of the sexual exploitation of women in Vietnam, citing information that has come to light since 1975.

== See also ==
- Violence against women
- Raptio
