= Embassy of Indonesia, Seoul =

Indonesian embassy in South Korea

Embassy of the Republic of Indonesia in Seoul Kedutaan Besar Republik Indonesia di Seoul 주대한민국 인도네시아공화국 대사관

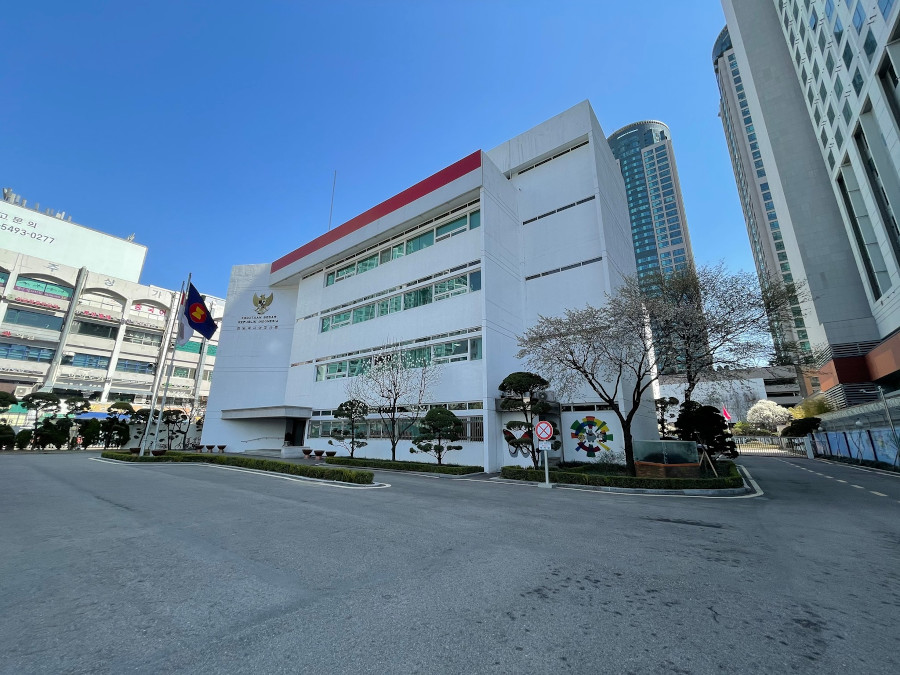
- Chancery of the Indonesian Embassy in Seoul
- Location: Seoul, South Korea
- Address: 380 Youidaebangro, Youdeungpoku; Seoul 150895, Republic of Korea
- Coordinates: 37.518501°N 126.93158°E
- Ambassador: Cecep Herawan
- Website: kemlu.go.id/seoul/en/

The Embassy of the Republic of Indonesia in Seoul (Indonesian: Kedutaan Besar Republik Indonesia di Seoul) is the diplomatic mission of the Republic of Indonesia to the Republic of Korea. The first Indonesian ambassador to South Korea was Sarwo Edhie Wibowo in 1974. The current ambassador, Cecep Herawan, was appointed by President Prabowo Subianto on 24 March 2025.

== See also ==
- Indonesia–South Korea relations
- List of diplomatic missions of Indonesia
- List of diplomatic missions in South Korea
