= Korean International School, HCMC =

- 호치민시한국국제학교

Location
- Số 21, Tân Phú, Quận 7, Tân Phú Quận 7 Hồ Chí Minh, Vietnam
- Coordinates: 10.7221°N 106.7324°E

Information
- Type: Private, international school
- Established: 1998
- Website: kshcm.net

Korean International School, HCMC (Korean: 호치민시한국국제학교) is a South Korean international school in Tan Phu Ward, District 7, Ho Chi Minh City, Vietnam. The school serves kindergarten through senior high school.

It was established on August 4, 1998.

As of 2017 it is the second largest South Korean international school in the world, only exceeded by the Jakarta International Korean School.

== See also ==
- Koreans in Vietnam
