= Jeongseon Lee clan =

Korean clan from Gangwon Province

- Country: Korea
- Current region: Jeongseon County
- Founder: Yi Yanggon
- Connected members: Yi Ŭimin

Jeongseon Lee clan (Korean: 정선 이씨; Hanja: 旌善 李氏, Vietnamese: Tinh Thiện Lý thị) is a Korean clan. Their Bon-gwan is in Jeongseon County, Gangwon Province (historical). According to the research held in 2000, the number of Jeongseon Lee clan's member was 3657. The Jeongseon Lee clan claims to be of Vietnamese origin, descending from Yi Yanggon, known as Lý Dương Côn in Vietnamese.

== Claimed Origin ==
According to the genealogical records of the Jeongseon Lee clan, their founder was Lý Dương Côn who was exiled to the Song dynasty and was settled in Qìng Prefecture during Emperor Huizong of Song's reign and then fled to Goryeo to avoid war with the Jin dynasty (1115–1234). Lý Dương Côn was originally born as a third son in Lý dynasty, Vietnam when Lý Nhân Tông, 5th king, ruled. He was the younger brother of Lý Thần Tông. However, he exiled himself to Song dynasty because he was involved a succession dispute. In Korean, Lý Dương Côn became known as Yi Yanggon. The son of Yi Yanggon, Yi Nan, (이난; 李蘭), became a Minister of Rites (예의판서; 禮儀判書; yeŭi p'ansŏ), and Yanggon's grandson, Yi Muchŏng (이무정; 李茂貞) was a junior second-grade official as a senior executive in letters (정당문학; 政堂文學; chŏngdang munhak). The sixth generation descendent of Yi Yanggon was Yi Ŭimin, who was born of slave origin but participated in the 1170 military coup and later became the military ruler of Goryeo.

The credibility of claim of descent from the Lý dynasty is questionable. Lý Nhân Tông was the fourth emperor not the fifth king and was recorded as having no children in the Đại Việt sử ký toàn thư, meaning neither Lý Thần Tông nor Lý Dương Côn were his sons. Lý Thần Tông was also born in 1116, meaning that Lý Dương Côn had to be born after 1116, as his younger brother. It would be near impossible for Yi Ŭimin, who took part in the 1170 military coup, to be his sixth generation descendant.

== See also ==
- Korean clan names of foreign origin
- Hwasan Lee clan
