= Jakarta Indonesia Korean School =

- 자카르타한국국제학교

Location
- Jl. Bina Marga No.24, Kel. Ceger, Jakarta Timur, Indonesia; Indonesia
- Coordinates: 6.3174321°S 106.89341260000003°E

Information
- Established: November 23, 1976
- Website: jiks.com

Jakarta Indonesia Korean School (JIKS, Korean: 자카르타한국국제학교), is a South Korean international school in East Jakarta, Indonesia. As of 2005 it is the largest overseas South Korean school, with 1,450 students. As of 2009 the school's student body is twice as large as that of the Korean International School, HCMC in Ho Chi Minh City, the next-largest South Korean international school.

== History ==
It was first established on November 23, 1976. Korean companies in Jakarta established JIKS. It initially had 26 students but the student population grew. In 1990 the Indonesian government gave the school a license to be an international school.

== See also ==
- Koreans in Indonesia
