= Li (surname 李) =

Chinese surname

Li / Lee
- The Chinese character for Li(Lee)
- Pronunciation: Lǐ (Mandarin Pinyin); Lei5 (Cantonese Jyutping); Lí (Hokkien Pe̍h-ōe-jī); Dy (Filipino)
- Language: Chinese, Korean, Thai, Vietnamese, Hmong

Origin
- Language: Old Chinese
- Meaning: Plum, plum tree

Other names
- Variant forms: Lee, Lei, Dy
- Derivatives: Lee/이 (Korean); Lee/หลี่ (Thai); Ly/Lý (Vietnamese); Ly/𖬃𖬰𖬞 (Hmong)

Transliteration	Regions
Li	China, Malaysia, Singapore
Lee	Taiwan, Hong Kong, Macau, Malaysia, Singapore, Korea, Thailand
Lei	Macau
Lie	Indonesia
Ly/Lý	Vietnam, Laos, Cambodia
Ee/I/Yi/Ri/Rhee/Rhie/Reeh	Korea

Li or Lee ([lì]; Chinese: 李; pinyin: Lǐ) is a common Chinese surname; it is the fourth name listed in the famous Hundred Family Surnames. Li is one of the most common surnames in Asia, shared by 92.76 million people in China, and more than 100 million in Asia. It is the second-most common surname in China as of 2018, the second-most common surname in Hong Kong, the most common surname in Macau and the 5th most common surname in Taiwan, where it is usually romanized as "Lee". The surname is pronounced as [lej˩˧] (Jyutping: Lei5) in Cantonese, Lí (poj) in Taiwanese Hokkien, but is often spelled as "Lee" in Hong Kong, Macau, Taiwan, Thailand and many overseas Chinese communities. In Macau, it is also spelled as "Lei". In Indonesia it is commonly spelled as "Lie". The common Korean surname, "Lee" (also romanized as "I", "Yi", "Ri", or "Rhee"), and the Vietnamese surname, "Lý", are both derived from Lee and written with the same Chinese character (李). The character also means "plum" or "plum tree".

== Demographics and distribution ==
Li or Lee (李) is one of the most common surnames in Asia, shared by more than 93 million people in China, or about 7.4% of the Chinese population. In Asia, more than 100 million people bear the surname. It was formerly thought to be the most common surname in China, but a 2013 analysis of the names of 1.33 billion Chinese citizens has concluded that Li is the second-most common surname, behind Wang with 95 million people. In 2019 it was again the second-most common surname in mainland China. Li (李) is the most common surname for the Hakka people.

Geographically, Li is one of the most common surnames in North China and Southwest China. In 2019, Li was the most common surname in Chongqing, Hubei, Hunan, Sichuan, and Yunnan. In provinces such as Hebei, Heilongjiang, Henan, Jilin, Shandong, Shanxi, and Yunnan, more than 8.8% of the local population are surnamed Li. Among all Chinese provinces, Henan has the largest number of people with the surname Li, accounting for 10.3% of the total population. Li is less common in southern and south-eastern China. Comparatively speaking, in Fujian, Hainan, Jiangxi, and Zhejiang, as well as Taiwan, only 2.2 to 6.6% of the population bear this surname.

== Origins ==
According to tradition, the Li surname originated from the title Dali held by Gao Yao, a legendary minister of the Xia dynasty, and was originally written with the different character (理). There is a claim that Laozi, the founder of Daoism, was Li Er. Li Er is the first historical person known to have the surname Li and is regarded as the founding ancestor of the surname.

=== Gao Yao ===
According to the ninth-century Tang dynasty text Yuanhe Xing Zuan, Li is a branch of the ancient ancestral name Ying (嬴) and descends from Emperor Zhuanxu, grandson of the mythical Yellow Emperor. During the reign of Emperor Yao, Gao Yao served as Dali (大理), or Minister of Law. Gao Yao's father was Shaohao (少昊). During the Xia dynasty, Gao Yao's descendants adopted Li (理) as their surname, from the title Dali (meaning "great judge").

It is uncertain how the character for Li changed from the original 理 to the current 李. According to popular folklore, at the end of the Shang dynasty, the minister Li Zheng (理征) was executed by Di Xin who was known for his cruelty. Li Zheng's son Li Lizhen (理利貞) escaped with his mother to the ruins of Yihou (伊侯之墟), where they survived by eating plums. In gratitude, Li Lizhen changed his surname to 李, a character that means "plum" and is a homophone of 理. Li Lizhen was said to have settled at Ku County (苦縣), in modern Luyi County, Henan province, which is regarded as the original hometown of the Li surname.

=== Lao ===
The first historical person known to have the surname is Li Er (李耳), better known as Laozi (fl. 6th century BC), the philosopher who founded Taoism. He was said to have been an eleventh-generation descendant of Li Lizhen. Laozi is widely revered as the founding ancestor of the Li surname.

Gao Heng considered the surname 李 as derived from the surname 老, that of Laozi, based on linguistic evidences. 李 and 老 were near-homophones in Laozi's time.

=== Ba people ===
Another early origin of Li is the non-Huaxia Ba people, who established the Ba state during the Zhou dynasty in modern western Hubei province and Chongqing municipality. In 316 BC, Ba was conquered by the state of Qin, which would eventually conquer all the warring states to establish the Qin dynasty. Many Ba people adopted Li as their surname, as it sounded similar to the Ba word for tiger, which was a totem for the Ba. In 304 AD, the Ba leader Li Xiong (Emperor Wu) established Cheng Han, the first Li-surnamed dynasty in history.

== Tang dynasty ==
Li Yuan (Emperor Gaozu), founder of the Tang dynasty

As the surname of the emperors of the Tang dynasty, Li was bestowed upon or adopted by numerous people. During the period, it became one of the most common Chinese surnames.

Li was the imperial surname of the Tang dynasty, founded by Li Yuan in 618 AD. One of the most prosperous and influential dynasties in Chinese history, Tang was ruled by 20 emperors surnamed Li. The Tang dynasty imperial family belonged to the northwest military aristocracy prevalent during the Sui dynasty and claimed to be paternally descended from Laozi, the Qin general Li Xin, the Han dynasty general Li Guang, and Western Liang ruler Li Gao.

The Tang emperors liberally granted the royal surname to favoured generals, officials, and their clans, such as Xu Shiji, Du Fuwei, and Guo Zihe (郭子和). Many non-Han people under Tang's rule were also granted the Li surname, including the Eastern Tujue khan Ashina Simo (Li Simo), Mohe leaders Li Duozuo and Li Jinxing (李謹行), Khitan leaders Li Guangbi and Li Jinzhong, and Goguryo general Li Zhengji. Some Tibetans, Uyghurs, Persians, and Jews were also granted the Li surname. The number of people surnamed Li skyrocketed during the Tang dynasty.

== Other dynasties ruled by Li families ==
During the Five Dynasties and Ten Kingdoms period following the fall of Tang in 907, the Shatuo general Li Keyong, who had been granted the Li surname, established the Jin State, precursor of the Later Tang. Li Bian (Xu Zhigao), the founder of the Southern Tang, also changed his surname to Li. The emperors of Later Tang and Southern Tang continued the Tang tradition of liberally bestowing the Li surname on their favoured people.

Other Li-surnamed dynasties include Liang, Western Xia, and Shun. All told, there have been 64 Li-surnamed emperors in Chinese history, ruling all or part of China for 650 years.

== Adoption by non-Han Chinese peoples ==
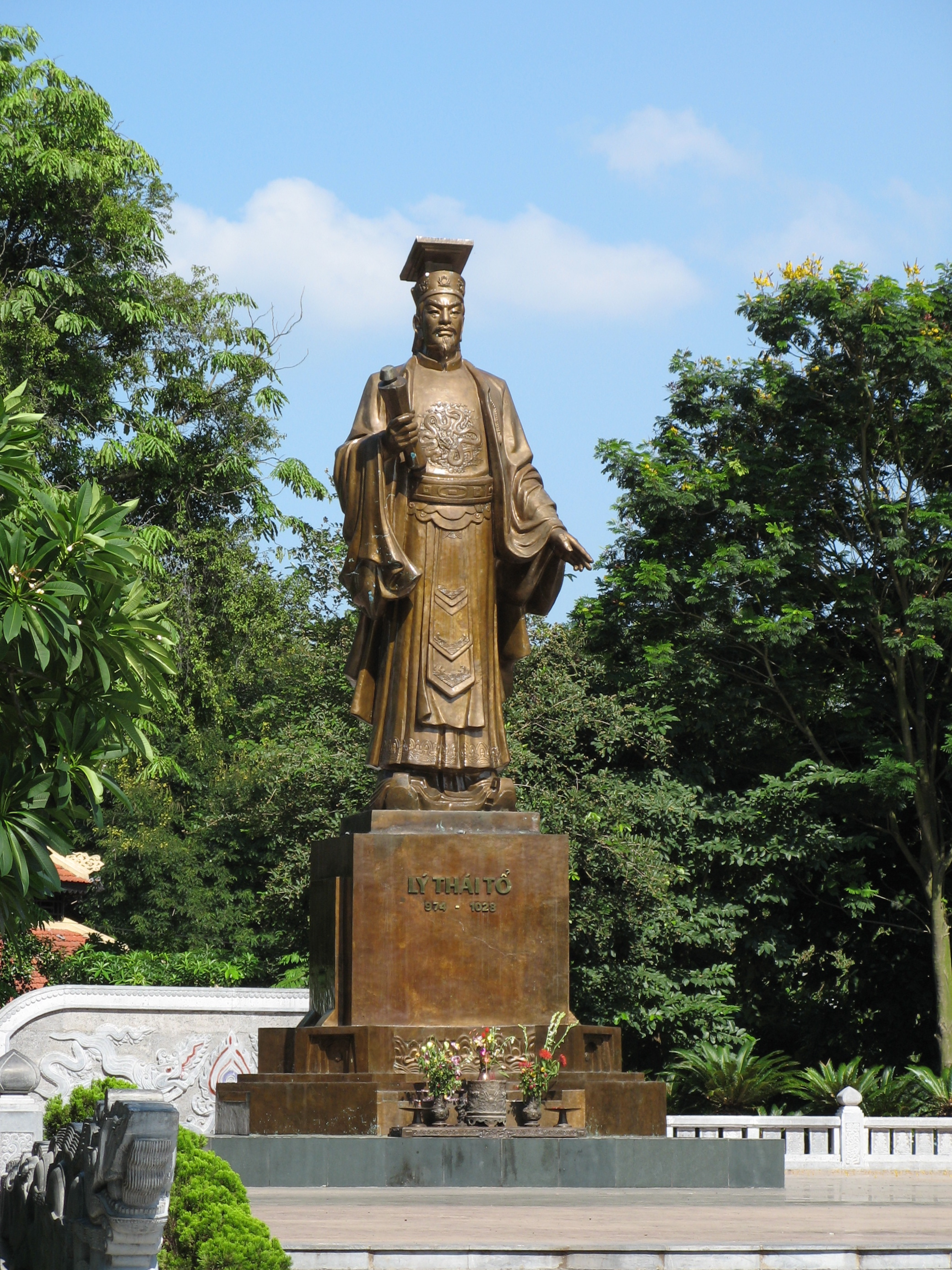
Lý Thái Tổ, founder of the Vietnamese Lý dynasty

Influenced by Chinese culture, many non-Han Chinese peoples living in and near China have adopted Chinese-style surnames throughout history, and Li is one of the most common surnames adopted. Li has been used by the Bai people for more than 1,000 years, and is one of the top three surnames among the Bai. Li is the fifth of the twelve most common surnames of the Yao people, who adopted the name more than 800 years ago. Li also has history of 500 years among the Miao people. Among the 55 officially recognized ethnic minorities in China, 33 are known to use the Li surname.

Outside China, the surname has also been adopted in Korea and Vietnam.

The first recording of the Korean Lee, Yi (이) surname appeared as early as in the early Three Kingdoms of Korea period (57 BCE – 668 CE) and was adopted among noblemen. Today, Lee (romanized as Lee, I, Yi (South Korea), Ri (North Korea)) is one of the top five Korean surnames. The surname today traces its roots to two main families in Korea. The first, the most famous, is the Jeonju Yi clan, the surname of Yi Seong-gye, 이성계, the first ruler of the Joseon dynasty. Yi was also the last ruling surname in Korea and ruled for around 500 years. The second is the Gyeongju Lee clan, which was founded by Yi Al-pyeong, 이알평), one of the village headmen who chose Park Hyeokgeose as the first king of Silla. According to the Samguk Sagi, the Yi name was officially bestowed on the family by King Yuri of Silla around 9 BCE.

Li (spelled Lý in modern Vietnamese) has been used in Vietnam for more than 2,000 years since the Han dynasty, when Northern Vietnam was ruled as a province of the Han Empire. In 544, Vietnam gained temporary independence from China when Lý Nam Đế founded the Early Lý dynasty. Lý Nam Đế (Li Nan Di), as an ethnic Chinese, ruled as an emperor of Vietnam. In 1009, Lý Thái Tổ established the Later Lý dynasty, which ruled Vietnam for more than 200 years. In 1232, after the Lý dynasty was replaced by the Trần dynasty, Grand Preceptor Trần Thủ Độ made some descendants of the Lý family change their surname to Nguyễn.

== Prominent clans ==
There are historically twelve prominent clans (junwang, 郡望) of Li, the most famous being those of the Longxi and Zhao commanderies. The Zhao clan, based in modern Hebei's Zhao County, traces its origin from Li Mu (died 229 BC), Lord Wu'an of the State of Zhao, a general of the Warring States period. The Zhao clan produced 17 prime ministers during the Tang dynasty. In 2010, a group of nine large tombs of the Zhao clan were discovered in Zanhuang County, dating from the Northern Dynasties.

The Zhao clan remained the most prominent branch of the Li until it was surpassed by the Longxi during the Tang dynasty. The Longxi clan is named after the Longxi Commandery in southern Gansu province. Li Chong (李崇), the first Qin governor of Longxi, is revered as its founder. The Han general Li Guang, famous for defeating the Xiongnu, came from Longxi. Centuries later, the Tang emperors traced their ancestry to the Longxi clan, making it the most prominent branch ever since. The Longxi Li is considered one of the four great cultural traditions of Gansu province. Longxi County has built a museum for the Li clan, and hosted the Longxi Li cultural festival in 2012.

There are 2,157 genealogy books of Li families known to be extant.

== Historical distribution and migration ==
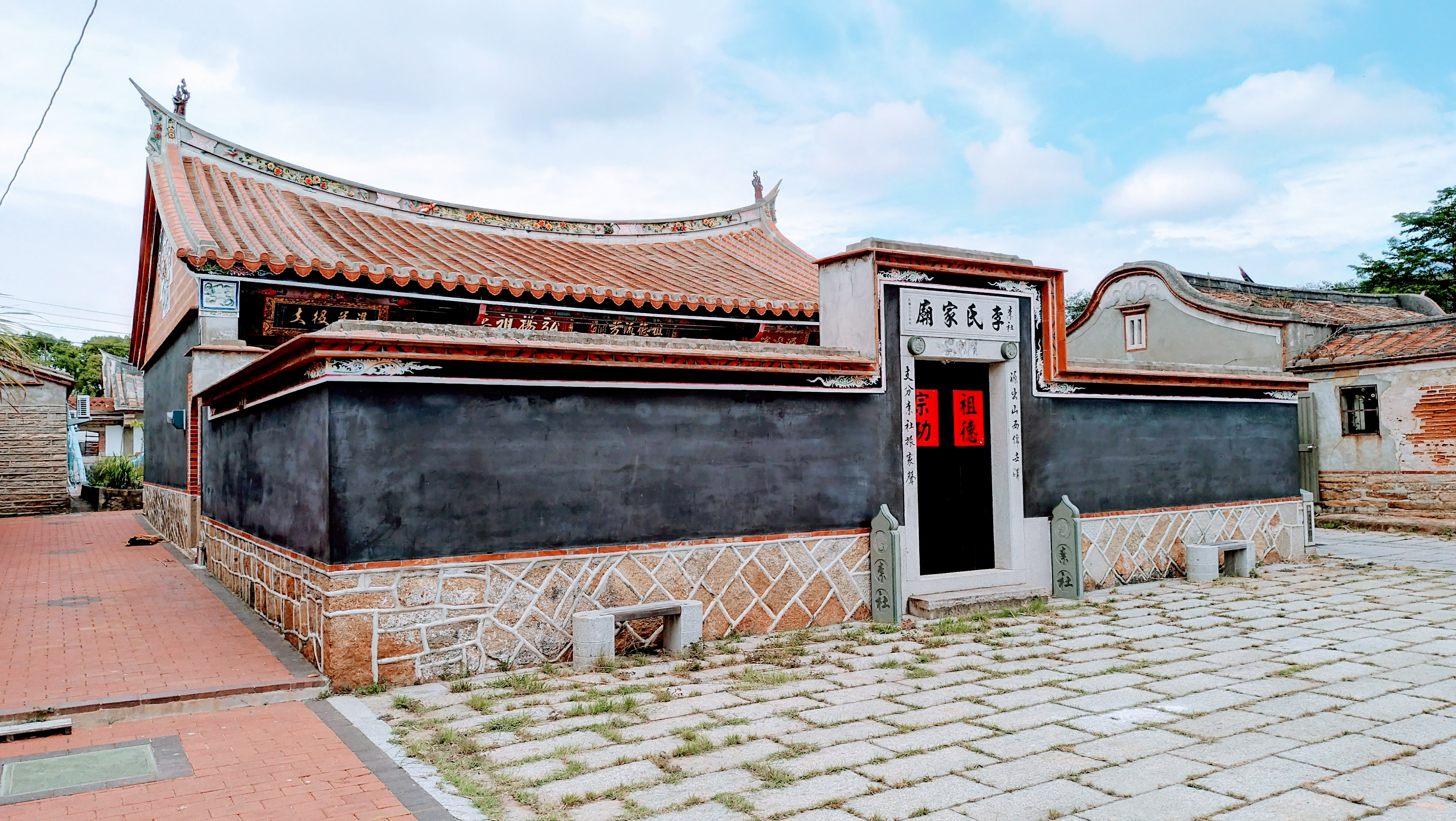
Lee Family Temple, Kinmen, Taiwan

Having originated in what is now Henan province, Li spread to Shanxi, Hebei, Shaanxi, Sichuan, and Hubei provinces by the end of the Warring States period. During the Qin dynasty, the Li clan spread to Guangdong and Guangxi provinces, while Li Chong established the Longxi Li clan in Gansu.

During the early Tang dynasty many Lis migrated to Fujian and Hainan provinces. After the mass adoption of the imperial Li surname during the Tang period, Li became the second-most common surname during the subsequent Song dynasty, after Wang. There were approximately 5.6 million people with the surname, or 7.2% of the total population at the time, with large concentrations in the northern provinces of Hebei, Henan, and Shandong.

The Mongol invasion of China in the 13th century caused widespread depopulation in northern China. Li, being over-represented in the north, was hit especially hard. In the Ming dynasty following the Mongol Yuan dynasty, the Li-surnamed population had declined to 5.1 million, constituting 5.5% of the total population. It fell behind Zhang to become the third most common surname of the time. Many of the Lis had migrated to South China by this period.

After the Chinese began immigrating to the West, a significant population of Li's now reside in the United States. Many have adopted the homophonic English surname "Lee," elevating it to the 22nd-most common surname. Over 30% of people with the surname Lee in America identify as Asian/Pacific Islander in origin, making it the most common Chinese surname in the United States.

== See also ==
- List of people with surname Li
- Lists of people with surname Lee
- Lý (Vietnamese surname)
- Lee (Korean surname)
- Li (Lee) Family
- House of Li
