= Koreans in Vietnam =

Ethnic group

Total population
- 290,000 (2011)

Regions with significant populations
- Ho Chi Minh City: 190,000
- Đồng Nai Province: 15,000
- Bình Dương Province: 15,000
- Hanoi: 70,000

Related ethnic groups
- Korean diaspora

Koreans in Vietnam form an unrecognized minority group in Vietnam.

The group is made up predominantly of ethnic Korean expatriates who immigrated to Vietnam and ethnic Kinh people (Vietnamese) people with Korean citizenship. A number of Koreans initially arrived in Vietnam in a military capacity, fighting on both sides of the Vietnam War, depending on their political affiliations. After the end of the war, there was little Korean migration or tourism in Vietnam, until the rapid development of the South Korean economy and the North Korean famine resulted in an influx of South Korean investors and North Korean defectors. A sizeable number of South Korean men settled in the country for marital reasons. Reportedly, Vietnamese women experience high levels of domestic violence and abuse due to the difficulties of intercultural marriage.

As of 2011, according to statistics of South Korea's Ministry of Foreign Affairs and Trade, there were 180,000 Korean citizens in Vietnam, making them the largest Korean diaspora community in Southeast Asia and the eighth-largest in the world. A more recent estimate from Vietnam Television put their number at 130,000. Vietnam and Korea maintained political relations in the past via the Lý dynasty of Vietnam fleeing to Korea through Taiwan. Lý Long Tường/Lee Yong Sang is one such notable figure.

== World War II ==
During World War II Japanese soldiers took Korean women with them as comfort women, after the war a number of Korean women were left behind in Vietnam.

== Vietnam War ==
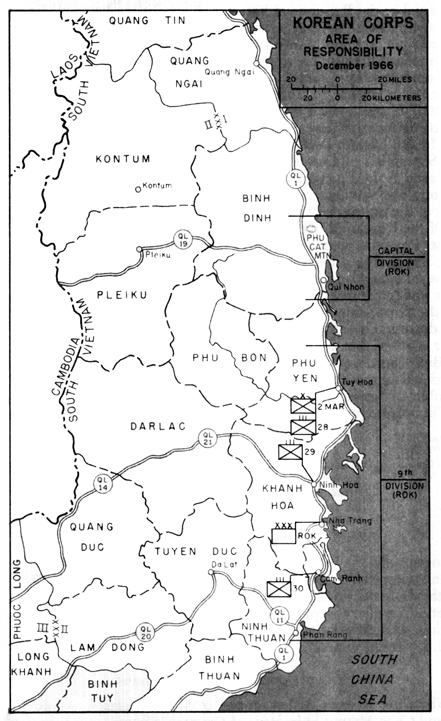
The areas of responsibility of the South Korean army in Vietnam as of December 1966

Both North and South Korea lent material and manpower support to their respective ideological allies during the Vietnam War, though the number of South Korean troops on the ground was larger. Then-South Korean president Syngman Rhee had offered to send troops to Vietnam as early as 1954, but his proposal was turned down by the U.S. Department of State; the first South Korean personnel to land in Vietnam, 10 years later, were non-combatants: ten Taekwondo instructors, along with thirty-four officers and ninety-six enlisted men of a Korean Army hospital unit. In total, between 1965 and 1973, 312,853 South Korean soldiers fought in Vietnam; According to Korean sources, they killed 41,400 North Vietnamese Army soldiers and 5,000 civilians. There were cases of war atrocities in which those that were revealed during the war were promptly investigated with the perpetrators punished. Others indicate that they were routinely unpunished, with widespread "My Lai Massacre-style massacres" having taken place. Controversy still remains as there are more alleged crimes that may not have been revealed. There were also thousands of children of mixed Korean and Vietnamese descent. Korean Presidents have repeatedly apologised and expressed regret on the issue, and South Korean civil groups and individuals have taken a pro-active effort in reconciliation, yet there is no compensation happened.

As a result of a decision of the Korean Workers' Party in October 1966, in early 1967 North Korea sent a fighter squadron to North Vietnam to back up the North Vietnamese 921st and 923rd fighter squadrons defending Hanoi. They stayed through 1968; 200 pilots were reported to have served. In addition, at least two anti-aircraft artillery regiments were sent as well.

== Post-war migration ==
=== South Koreans ===
Four years after the 1992 normalisation of diplomatic ties, South Korean trade and investment in Vietnam grew rapidly. Following along with the investment funds, the South Korean expatriate community in Vietnam has grown significantly. According to Chang Keun Lee of the Korean Chamber of Commerce and Industry in Vietnam, Koreans formed the country's second-largest group of expatriates, with only the Taiwanese expatriate community being larger; he estimated that half lived in Ho Chi Minh City. Statistics from South Korea's Ministry of Foreign Affairs and Trade show that their population has grown by nearly fifty times in little more than a decade. Their population more than trebled from 1,788 in 1997 to 6,226 in 2003, then jumped to more than thirteen times that size—84,566—by just six years later. However, in the two years after that, the population would only grow by a further 4% to 88,120. Some anti-Korean sentiment also exists, fueled by decreases in promised investment, reports of poor treatment faced by Vietnamese migrants in South Korea, and the 2008 murder of a Hanoi National University student by her South Korean boyfriend. As both countries also share similar cultures (both belonged to the Chinese cultural sphere) and share similar recent histories, South Korean investors soon took a strong interest in investing in Vietnam.

South Koreans have established a number of community organisations in Vietnam, including Koviet, a group for second-generation Korean youth raised in Vietnam, founded in 1995

=== North Koreans ===
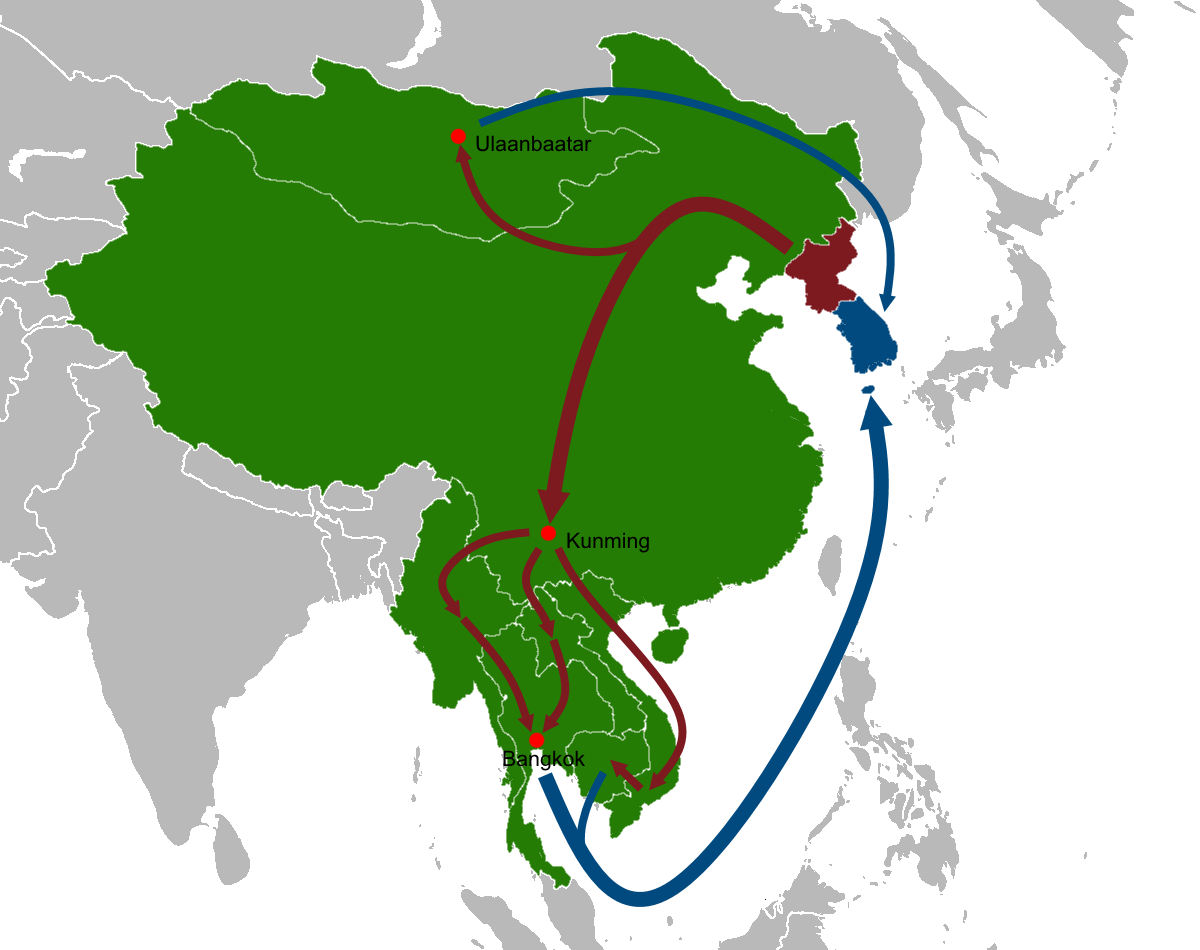
North Korean defectors often pass through Vietnam on their way to South Korea.

Before 2004, thousands of North Korean defectors had crossed Vietnam's northern border to find the way to reach South Korea. Until 2004, Vietnam was described as the "preferred Southeast Asian escape route" for North Korean defectors, largely due to its less-mountainous terrain. Though Vietnam remains an officially communist country and maintains diplomatic relations with North Korea, growing South Korean investment in Vietnam has prompted Hanoi to quietly permit the transit of North Korean refugees to Seoul. The increased South Korean presence in the country also proved a magnet for defectors; four of the biggest defector safehouses in Vietnam were run by South Korean expatriates, and many defectors indicated that they chose to try to cross the border from China into Vietnam precisely because they had heard about such safehouses. In July 2004, 468 North Korean refugees were airlifted to South Korea in the single largest mass defection; Vietnam initially tried to keep their role in the airlift secret, and in advance of the deal, even anonymous sources in the South Korean government would only tell reporters that the defectors came from "an unidentified Asian country". Following the airlift, Vietnam would tighten up border controls and deport several safe-house operators.

== Education ==
Vietnam's first school for South Korean nationals, the weekend Hanoi Hangul School, was founded on 1 March 1996, enrolling 122 students at the kindergarten through middle school levels; two Korean international schools offering a full-day programme were also later established, the Korean International School, HCMC in Ho Chi Minh City (founded 4 August 1998, enrolling 745 students at the kindergarten through high school levels); and Hanoi Korean International School, a smaller school in Hanoi (founded 13 July 2006, with 63 elementary-level students). Prior to the opening of the Korean international school in Hanoi, most Korean families in Hanoi sent their children to local schools, as the other international schools were too expensive.

== International marriage ==
South Korean men started seeking wives in Vietnam. Two to three thousand South Korean marriage agencies were created which specialize in making such matches. Though in the 1990s most were farmers, an increasing number of urban men have also resorted to arranging marriages through international matchmaking agencies; they cite the difficulty faced by uneducated men or those with low incomes in attracting Vietnamese women to marry them. However, reports suggest high rates of domestic violence, abuse, and divorce.

== See also ==
- North Korea–Vietnam relations
- South Korea–Vietnam relations
- Lai Daihan
- Vietnamese people in Korea
- Hari Won
- Korean diaspora
- Immigration to Vietnam
