= Guo Zihe =

Yongle Wang

Yongle
- Reign: March 617 – July 618
- Died: 664
- Family name: Guo (郭)/Li(李); Given name: Zihe (子和)
Era name and dates
- Zhengping(正平)/Chouping(醜平): March 617 – July 618
- Father: Guo Tai Gong

Yiguogong
- Chinese: 夷國公
- Literal meaning: "Duke of Yi"
Transcriptions
Standard Mandarin
- Hanyu Pinyin: Yí Guógōng
- Wade–Giles: I2 Kuo2-kung1
Yue: Cantonese
- Yale Romanization: Yi4 Gwok3gung1

Li Zihe
- Chinese: 李子和
- Literal meaning: (personal name)
Transcriptions
Standard Mandarin
- Hanyu Pinyin: Lǐ Zǐhé
Yue: Cantonese
- Yale Romanization: Lei5 Ji2wo4

Guo Zihe
- Chinese: 郭子和
- Literal meaning: (personal name)
Transcriptions
Standard Mandarin
- Hanyu Pinyin: Guō Zǐhé
Yue: Cantonese
- Yale Romanization: Gwok3 Ji2wo4

Li Zihe (Chinese: 李子和; pinyin: Lǐ Zǐhé; ?–664) was an anti-king during the Sui dynasty. His original surname was Guo (郭), but he was later bestowed the family name of the Tang imperial clan, Li (李), by Emperor Gaozu, the Tang dynasty's founding emperor. Ancestral home to the Tongzhou (同州) Pucheng (蒲城). President Zuo Yiwei during the Sui Dynasty, because of the crime in exile in Yulin (榆林). In 617, during the last years of Daye (大業; Emperor Yang of Sui's era name), he rebelled against the Sui dynasty, proclaiming himself the King of Yongle and changing the era name to Zhengping (正平) or Chouping (醜平).

In 618, he surrendered to the Tang dynasty, and he was awarded the main of the Lingzhou (靈州), the Duke of Jinhejun (金河郡), in 619, to seal the Public of Cheng (郕). In 622, the attendants were able to pacify the renewed rebellion of Liu Heita, give the family name is Li and give the general of Youwuwei. In 637, he was a Cishi of Wuzhou (婺州), to the Public of Yi (夷). He died in 664.

== Family ==
=== Father ===
- Guo Tai Gong (郭太公)

=== Brothers ===
- Guo Zizheng (郭子政)
- Guo Ziduan (郭子端)
- Guo Zisheng (郭子昇)

== Bibliographies ==
- New Book of Tang (新唐書) Volume 92
- Zizhi Tongjian, vols. 183, 185, 188, 190, 194.
