= Indonesians in South Korea =

Ethnic group

Indonesians in South Korea numbered 34,514 individuals as of August 2021, down from 41,599 in 2009 according to South Korean government statistics. More than 90% of those are estimated to be migrant workers employed on short-term contracts. In 2007 the South Korean government extended the validity of Indonesians' working permits from three to five years, and has modified the recruitment process in order to improve working conditions. Indonesian workers in South Korea are paid an average of US$1,000 per month.

The Indonesian government signed its first memorandum of understanding with the South Korean government about the provision of labourers to South Korea in 2004, after having signed similar agreements with Jordan, Kuwait, and Malaysia. Indonesia's official news agency ANTARA claimed there were 600,000 illegal Indonesian workers in South Korea as of 2006, making up almost 87% of the estimated 692,000 illegal Indonesian workers worldwide.

== See also ==
- Indonesia–South Korea relations
- Indonesian diaspora
- Immigration to South Korea
- Koreans in Indonesia
