= Korea-Indonesia Peace Park =

Monument in Surabaya, Jawa Timur, Indonesia

- Monumen Persahabatan Indonesia dan Korea Selatan
- Interactive map of the Korea-Indonesia Peace Park area

General information
- Type: Monument
- Location: Surabaya, Jawa Timur, Indonesia
- Coordinates: 7°16′59.124″S 112°44′1.752″E
- Opened: 2010

The Indonesian and South Korean Friendship Monument (Indonesian: Monumen Persahabatan Indonesia dan Korea Selatan; Korean: 평화 기원의 탑; lit. 'Peaceful Tower') is a monument in Surabaya, Jawa Timur, Indonesia.

== History ==
Indonesia and South Korea's diplomatic relationship commenced in the mid-20th century. Indonesia formally acknowledged the Republic of Korea on September 17, 1966, and they officially established diplomatic ties on September 18, 1973. This era marked the onset of a durable partnership that has progressively developed over the years.

The Indonesian-South Korean Friendship Monument, a collaborative project between the South Korean Government and the Surabaya City Government, was unveiled on May 8, 2010. The inauguration ceremony, led by Lim Taek Sun, Chairman of the South Korean Community Association in Surabaya, and Surabaya's then Mayor Bambang D. H., marked the official opening of The Indonesian-South Korean Friendship Monument.

== Architecture ==
The monument takes the form of a rectangular box accompanied by two plaques on its sides. These plaques, written in both Indonesian and South Korean languages, elaborate on the purpose of the Indonesia-South Korea Friendship Monument. One plaque, adorned with the Indonesian flag, explains its significance in Indonesian, while the other, featuring the South Korean flag, provides the explanation in Korean.

== See also ==
- Indonesia-South Korea relations
