= Korean language education in Vietnam =

Korean language education in Vietnam includes learning at Vietnamese colleges and universities, schools, and institutions.

South Korea, one of Asia's only two DAC members, is the largest foreign investor with a registered capital of nearly $82 billion as of April 2022, ranking second in development aid and third in trade with Vietnam. Vietnam is the country with the second most popular Korean language after South Korea. In a total of two years in 2021 and 2022, 28,450 Vietnamese took the TOPIK Korean is the first foreign language selected by the Vietnamese education authorities and can be learned from the third grade of elementary school.

== History ==
Korean language education in Vietnam has begun in 1992 when the two countries officially established diplomatic relations. In addition, strong investments by large South Korean companies such as Samsung, LG, SK, POSCO, Hyundai Motor, and Lotte in Vietnam increased the demand for Korean-speaking personnel.

== Current status ==
As of 2022, 11,600 people in 79 elementary, middle, and high schools across the country learned Korean.

=== Korean language study project ===
The Korea International Cooperation Agency (KOICA) provided $12,000 for the Korean Smart Study, a Korean digital education project at Dong-A University.

== See also ==
- Language learning
- King Sejong Institute
- Korean as a foreign language
- South Korea–Vietnam relations
