= Hwasan Lee clan =

Korean clan from North Hwanghae Province

- Country: Korea
- Current region: Kumchon County
- Founder: Lý Long Tường
- Connected members: Lee Se-hee
- Website: http://hoasonly.com/

Hwasan Lee clan (Korean: 화산 이씨; Hanja: 花山 李氏; Vietnamese: Gia tộc Lý Hoa Sơn) is a Korean clan with Vietnamese origin. Their Bon-gwan is in Kumchon County, North Hwanghae Province. As of 2000, there are 1775 members of this clan. Their founder was Lee Yong-sang (Vietnamese: Lý Long Tường), a member of the Vietnamese imperial family of the Lý dynasty. He was exiled to Goryeo through the Song dynasty in 1226 when the Lý dynasty fell to the Trần dynasty.

== See also ==
- Korean clan names of foreign origin
- Jeongseon Lee clan
