= Trần Dụ Châu =

Vietnamese military officer

Colonel Trần Dụ Châu

1st Director of the Ordnance Bureau Ministry of Defense
- In office 1947 (Note: 1946, according to certain news sources.)–1950
- Minister: Võ Nguyên Giáp (1947); Tạ Quang Bửu (1947–1948); Võ Nguyên Giáp (1948–1950)
- Preceded by: Post established Vũ Anh (as Director of the Ordnance Office)
- Succeeded by: Post abolished Trần Đăng Ninh (as Director of the General Supplies Directorate)

Personal details
- Born: 1906 Nghệ An, Annam, French Indochina
- Died: 6 September 1950 (aged 43–44) Thái Nguyên, Democratic Republic of Vietnam
- Cause of death: Capital punishment

Military service
- Branch/service: (North Vietnam) People's Army of Vietnam
- Years of service: 1946–1950
- Rank: Colonel (stripped)
- Commands: Ordnance Bureau; Ordnance Office
- Battles/wars: First Indochina War; Battle of Hà Nội (1946)

Trần Dụ Châu (1906–1950) was an officer in the People's Army of Vietnam who was executed in 1950 because of corruption. His example was the first corruption case to end in capital punishment in the history of the then Democratic Republic of Vietnam.

== Early life and career ==
Trần Dụ Châu was born in 1906 in the province of Nghệ An. In 1930, he began working for the French embassy as a secretary and also wrote for Thanh Nghệ Tĩnh newspaper; however he was laid off by the embassy. In 1932, Châu began working as a train employee in northern Annam and became an accounting manager after the Japanese coup d'état in French Indochina (1945). Thanks to his connections with the Japanese, he acquired a warehouse of fabric in the district of Đức Phong, sold it, and bought a villa in Đà Lạt. After the August Revolution, Châu offered a part of his property to the country and started working for the Việt Minh as a member of the Vietnamese Railway Office Committee and the Railway Workers' National Salvation Association. In the First Indochina War, shortly after the war broke out, Châu traveled to northern Vietnam, and he was given a mission to arrange the transport of thousands of tons of rice and salt from Vân Đình, Hà Đông, to troops stationed in Việt Bắc. His quality service secured him a Colonelcy and the position of head of Ordnance. His status as a notorious "player" gradually emerged.

In a reorganization of the Ministry of Defense on 18 June 1949, Colonel Trần Dụ Châu's continued employment as Director of the Ordnance Office was confirmed by a decree from Chairman Hồ Chí Minh. The same decree confirmed his appointment as Director of the Ordnance Bureau since 19 March 1947 by "Decree no. 36-SL".

== Trial and execution ==
After going to a wedding with Trần Dụ Châu as the person presiding the wedding, poet Đoàn Phú Tứ wrote a letter to Hồ Chí Minh, accusing Châu of corruption. A military court was established at the hall. On 5 September 1950, a trial was carried out for Trần Dụ Châu, Lê Sỹ Cửu (Châu's assistant), and Bùi Minh Chân (Châu's secretary). Đoàn Phú Tứ was also invited to the trial. Major General Chu Văn Tấn sat as Chief Justice along with two lay judges: Mr. Phạm Ngọc Hải, Director of Justice for the Việt Bắc Inter-Region, and Mr. Trần Tấn, Deputy Director of the Ordnance Bureau. Major General Trần Tử Bình sat on the Prosecuting Commissioner's (now the People's Procurator) seat. After the trial, Trần Dụ Châu was sentenced to death. He also sent an appeal to Hồ Chí Minh but was declined. Châu was executed on 6 September by a firing line. He had taken 57,959 đồng, 149 United States dollars, and other goods worth 143,900 đồng.

== Controversy ==
As commonly seen with many junior to field-grade wartime officers from North Vietnam during the Indochina War, Trần Dụ Châu's status and the exact nature of his posts have been under debate. Information about his family is not publicly available. Certain sources reported that both Lê Sỹ Cửu and Bùi Minh Chân committed suicide during detention. It is unclear how they were able to achieve this end.

On the distinction between the then "Ordnance Bureau" and the "Ordnance Office", the Vietnamese Lawyers Journal wrote: "At the time, the Ordnance Bureau was only responsible for management and administration, while the Ordnance Office was directly responsible for the production of military uniforms and equipment." (Note: "Lúc đó, Cục Quân Nhu chỉ phụ trách việc quản lý, quản trị, còn Nha Quân Nhu mới có nhiệm vụ trực tiếp sản xuất quân trang, quân dụng.")
