= Lý Long Tường =

Vietnamese Korean prince (fl. 12th century)

Lý Long Tường (1174 – ?) was a Vietnamese prince of the Lý dynasty of Đại Việt (in modern-day Vietnam) who went to Korea and became a general. In Korea he went by the name Yi Yong-sang (Korean: 이용상; Hanja: 李龍祥). He is the progenitor of a still-extant Korean clan: the Hwasan Lee clan.

He was born in 1174, the seventh son of Emperor Lý Anh Tông (who reigned from 1138 to 1175) and his consort Lê Mỹ Nga. He was appointed the Great National Tutor.

== Life in exile ==
In 1226, (Kiến Trung's year of the Second Trần dynasty of Thái Tông), in order to avoid further bloodshed by the Trần family, Lý Long Tường, together with 6000 mandarins and servants departed from the Thần Phù (now Thanh Hóa Province) estuary and fled to the South China Sea in three large ships. They carried relics with them, including the imperial crown, imperial costumes, and the heaven imperial sword (Thượng phương bảo kiếm). After a month on the high seas, they were forced to land in Taiwan due to a typhoon. When Lý Long Tường decided to leave, his son Lý Long Hiền was severely ill and had to stay in Taiwan together with 200 mandarins, followers and servants. Lý Long Tường continued northwards to Ongjin County and then on to Haeju, Hwanghae in the Yellow Sea. Legend has it that the Korean king Gojong of Goryeo (1192–1259) had dreamt of a grand phoenix flying from the south and landing in his nation. Therefore, he ordered the local government of Hae-ju to give the Vietnamese royal refugees a red-carpeted welcome and allow them to live in a manor in his country.

Lý Long Tường and his companions started their culture of fishing and breeding. He also opened a school for literature (poetry, rhythmical prose and worship rituals) and a school to teach martial arts/the art of war. Thousands of local students joined his two schools.

== Defeat of the Mongol invaders ==
In 1232, an army of the Mongol Empire led by General Sartai launched an attack on Korea by both sea and land. The troops, using the waterways, attacked Hwang-hae but were defeated by the army and the local inhabitants led by Ly Long Tuong. Ly Long Tuong always rode a white horse and as a result, was dubbed the "White Horse General."

In 1253, the Mongol army led by the great Khan Möngke launched a second attack on Korea. The Yuan-Mongol army, led by Tang Ji, attacked Hwang-hae overland and by using the waterways. Lý Long Tường, although by then over 70 years old, led the army and the local inhabitants to victory after a five-month campaign. As a result of this important triumph, the Korean king renamed Jin-san (진산; 鎭山) Hwa-san (화산; 花山) and appointed Ly Long Tuong Hwa-san gun (花山君). The location of the Mongol army surrender was called the Gate of Surrender Acceptance (受降門; Su-hang-mun). The Korean king also had a pillar erected here to honour Ly Long Tuong. (The pillar can still be seen today).

When Lý Long Tường died, he was buried at the foot of Mount Di A near Panmunjeom. The mountain peak (Kwang-dea) where Lý Long Tường always sat to look southwards and cried is now called the "Peak of Nostalgia" (望國壇).

== Descendants in Korea ==
Today, there are some 1500 households in North Korea and 600 in South Korea with connections to Lý Long Tường. A descendant of Lý Long Tường, Lee Chang Kun (Ly Xuong Can), and Ly Sang Joon (Ly Tung Tuan, the Founder of Golden Bridge Finance Group) visits Lý's temple in Dinh Bang village in Bắc Ninh Province every year with his family living and sends money to help in the reconstruction of the temple. He has also invested in local projects and together with this family took up Vietnamese citizenship in 2010. His son born in 1997 was named Ly Viet Quoc. At the end of 1995, a report on Lý Long Tường was broadcast by South Korean TV channel KBS.

Lý Long Tường was also the progenitor of a Korean clan - the Hwasan Lee clan.

== See also ==
- Hwasan Lee clan
- North Korea–Vietnam relations
- South Korea–Vietnam relations
