= Koreans in Indonesia =

Ethnic group

Koreans in Indonesia 재인도네시아 한인 Orang Korea di Indonesia
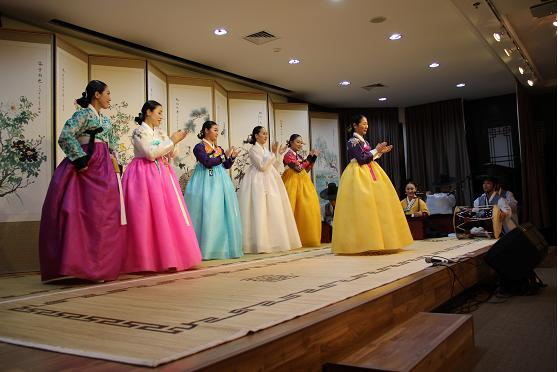
- Opening ceremony held by the National Gugak Center at the Korean Cultural Center in Jakarta, Indonesia in July 2011

Total population
- 78,676 (2017)

Regions with significant populations
- Jakarta, Tangerang, Yogyakarta, East Java (Surabaya, Banyuwangi Regency), Bandung, Denpasar, Batam, Medan, Kendari
- Jakarta and surroundings: 55,824
- Surabaya and surroundings: 7,710
- Elsewhere in Java: 6,872
- Bali, Lombok, Sulawesi, Papua: 6,520
- Sumatra, Kalimantan: 1,750

Languages
- Korean, Indonesian, English

Religion
- Christianity, Buddhism, Islam

Related ethnic groups
- Korean diaspora

Koreans in Indonesia

Korean name
- Hangul: 재인도네시아 한인
- Hanja: 在인도네시아 韓人
Transcriptions
- Revised Romanization: Jae-Indonesia Hanin
- McCune–Reischauer: Chae-Indonesia Hanin

Indonesian name
- Indonesian: Orang Korea di Indonesia

Koreans in Indonesia numbered 78,676 individuals as of 2018, making them the 13th-largest population of overseas Koreans, according to South Korea's Ministry of Foreign Affairs. The number has increased significantly from the previous record, which was around 50,000 people.

== Migration history ==
One of the leading figures of the Indonesian independence movement, Komarudin (Korean name: Yang Chil-seong; Korean: 양칠성; Hanja: 楊七性) was an ethnic Korean.

The Korean presence in Indonesia goes back several decades. The Jakarta International Korean School in East Jakarta opened on 1 February 1975, and as of 2007 enrolled 719 elementary school students, 357 middle school students, and 375 high school students. It is thus the largest Korean day school in Southeast Asia, at more than twice the enrollment of the one in Ho Chi Minh City. A Koreatown began to form in South Jakarta's Kebayoran Baru subdistrict as early as 1982, when Kim Woo-jae opened a shop selling kimchi and doenjang.

Between 2011 and 2013, their population increased by 11%. Nearly all (38,401, or 95%) are staying in Indonesia on ordinary residence visas. Other categories have shown rapid growth in recent years but remain small in absolute numbers: those on international student visas number 664 people (up 137% since 2011), 814 (up 285%) have permanent residence status, and 405 (up 58%) have become Indonesian citizens. The sex ratio of the community is unbalanced, with 1.3 men for every woman, similar to the pattern seen in most South Korean migrant communities in Southeast Asian countries besides Malaysia and Singapore; however, the imbalance has decreased from earlier years. Unlike Japanese expatriates of earlier years, most South Korean expatriates come accompanied by their families.

== Business and employment ==
Most South Korean migrant workers in Indonesia are employees of South Korea multinational conglomerates with investments in Indonesia, or owners of small and medium-sized enterprises. Labour relations at South Korean-owned factories were poor in the 1990s, but have improved in recent years.

== Distribution ==
In 2005 there were about 30,000 South Koreans living in Indonesia, with most of them being in the Jakarta area. Of the rest, 1,200 lived in Surabaya, 600 lived in Bandung, 150 lived in Bali, and 550 lived elsewhere.

The main Korean areas in Jakarta proper are Cibubur in East Jakarta and Kelapa Gading and Sunter in North Jakarta. There are also Korean populations in Bogor, Cikarang in Bekasi Regency, and Tangerang. Most of the Bekasi Koreans work in the electronics industry. In Tangerang most Koreans work for manufacturing companies, In particular those involved in the making of shoes, and many Korean-owned businesses are in Lippo Village (Lippo Karawaci). 80% of the commercial buildings in Lippo Village are occupied by ethnic Koreans.

Farther away from Jakarta, Korean nationals are also served by two other weekend schools, the Surabaya Hangul School (founded 1 January 1989, enrolling 42 students at the kindergarten and elementary levels), and the Bandung Hangul School (founded 1 March 1992, enrolling 66 students at the kindergarten through middle school levels). Semarang is another area mentioned as having a large number of Koreans, though they lack any Korean-language educational facilities there. Bali, a popular destination for Korean tourists, has also begun to attracting some scattered Korean workers.

== Religion ==
The directory of the Korean Association in Indonesia listed 14 Korean churches (of various denominations, including Presbyterianism) and one Buddhist temple of the Jogye Order in the Jabodetabek area. Muslims form a smaller minority of the Korean community. The Indonesian branch of the Korean Muslim Federation opened in 1982; they sponsored 22 Muslims from South Korea to come to Indonesia as students in 1983 and 1984 to study in local universities and better understand Islam. According to their figures, as of 2005, there were only 50 Korean Muslims in Indonesia, including those who had converted while living there.

== Notable people ==
- Ji Da-bin, footballer
- J.P Cho, architect and academician, one of the founders of the Atma Jaya University
- Yoo Hyun-goo, former footballer
- Yoo Jae-hoon, former football player and manager
- Lee Jeong-hoon, actor, singer, television personality
- Komarudin (born Yang Chil-seong), freedom fighter
- Ranty Maria, actress
- Lee Yu-jun, footballer
- Kim Chong Sung, politician

== See also ==
- Indonesian Chinese
- Indonesians in South Korea
- Japanese migration to Indonesia
