= North Korea–Vietnam relations =

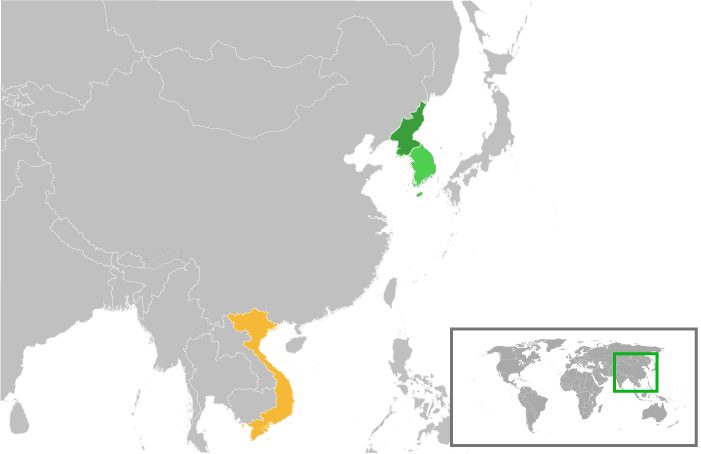

- North Korea: Vietnam

Diplomatic mission
- Embassy of North Korea, Hanoi: Embassy of Vietnam, Pyongyang

North Korea and the former country of North Vietnam established formal diplomatic relations on January 31, 1950. In July 1957, North Vietnam President Ho Chi Minh visited North Korea; North Korean prime minister Kim Il Sung visited North Vietnam in November–December 1958 and November 1964. In February 1961, the two governments concluded an agreement on scientific and technical cooperation. North Vietnam reunified with South Vietnam in June 1976 to form modern-day Vietnam.

== History ==
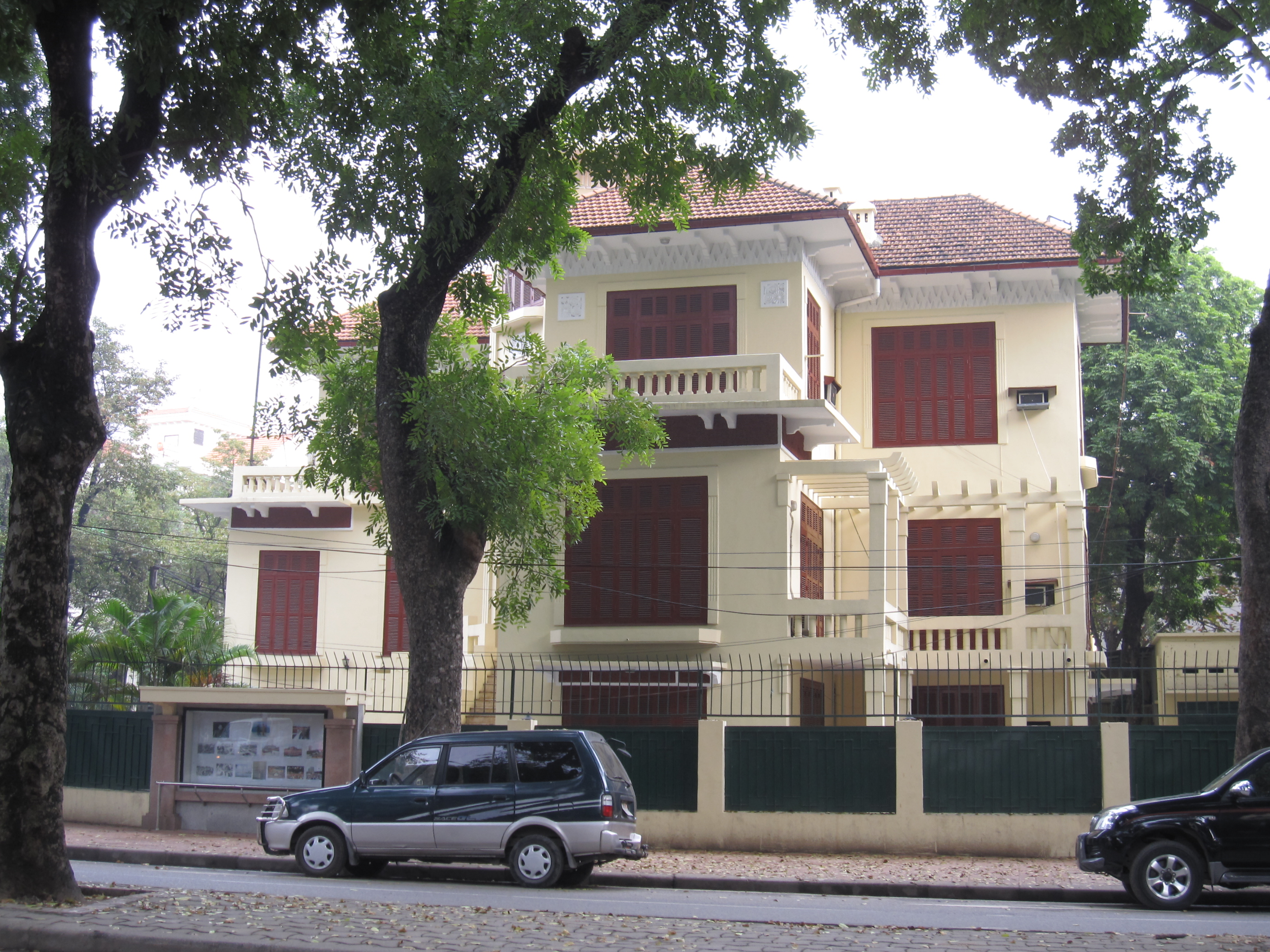
North Korean embassy in Hanoi, Vietnam.

During the Vietnam War, North Korea provided substantial economic and military aid to North Vietnam (1966: 12.3 million rubles; 1967: 20 million; 1968: 12.5 million; 1969: 12.5 million). In 1968, approximately 2,000 Vietnamese students and trainees received education for free in Korea. As a result of a decision of the Korean Workers' Party in October 1966, in early 1967 North Korea sent a fighter squadron to North Vietnam to back up the North Vietnamese 921st and 923rd fighter squadrons defending Hanoi. They stayed through 1968; 200 pilots were reported to have served. In addition, at least two anti-aircraft artillery regiments were sent as well. North Korea also sent weapons, ammunition and two million sets of uniforms to their comrades in North Vietnam. Kim Il Sung is reported to have told his pilots to "fight in the war as if the Vietnamese sky were their own."

From 1968, however, relations between Pyongyang and Hanoi started to deteriorate for various reasons. Anxious to keep the United States bogged down in Vietnam, North Korea disagreed with North Vietnam's decision to enter peace negotiations with the U.S., and reacted negatively to the Paris Peace Accords. During the Cambodian Civil War, North Korea approved the Chinese plan to create a "united front of the five revolutionary Asian countries" (China, Korea, Vietnam, Laos, and Cambodia), whereas North Vietnam rejected it on the grounds that such a front would exclude the Soviet Union and challenge Vietnamese dominance in Indochina. Around this time, the Vietnam War came to an end. The government of North Vietnam, unlike that of North Korea, succeeded in reunifying the whole country by 1975. During the Cambodian–Vietnamese War, the North Korean leadership condemned the Vietnamese invasion of Cambodia, refused to recognize the People's Republic of Kampuchea, and allowed the exiled Norodom Sihanouk to stay in Korea. North Korea also provided supports for the Khmer Rouge during that time, sided with China during the Sino-Vietnamese War, and also demanded Vietnam to be removed from the Non-Aligned Movement. According to historian Balazs Szalontai, Vietnam came to resent what it saw as North Korea's self-centred behaviour, and the two governments became rivals rather than friends. During the same time, Pol Pot, General Secretary of the Communist Party of Kampuchea and the leader of Khmer Rouge, managed to have a visit to North Korea, one of only two foreign trips led by Pol Pot, further strained North Korean–Vietnamese relations, as Pol Pot was a recognized enemy of Vietnam.

=== 21st century ===
In the 1990s and 2000s, North Korean-Vietnamese relations declined even more due to investment and trade disputes.

The former Vietnamese ambassador to South Korea is a graduate of North Korea's Kim Il Sung University. The son of a former staff member in the Vietnamese embassy in Pyongyang, who also attended Kim Il Sung University between 1998 and 2002, gave an interview in 2004 with South Korean newspaper The Chosun Ilbo about the experiences he had while living there.

While its giant neighbor China is an obvious example of economic reform to follow, experts say Vietnam is seen as a far better model by North Korea.

Kim Jong Un came to Vietnam on February 26, 2019, on a 60-hour train ride to attend the Hanoi Summit with U.S. President Donald Trump. He was greatly welcomed by the Vietnamese officials and made a visit to the North Korean Embassy in Hanoi. On March 1 and 2, Kim Jong Un made an official visit to Vietnam, 60 years after his grandfather Kim Il Sung's first visit to the country. He met the Vietnamese President and General Secretary Nguyễn Phú Trọng, Prime Minister Nguyễn Xuân Phúc and National Assembly Chairwoman Nguyễn Thị Kim Ngân. Both countries agreed on tightening diplomatic and economic ties, which were damaged by previous North Korean support for the Khmer Rouge.

General Secretary Tô Lâm visited North Korea in October 2025 to meet Kim Jong Un. The exact dates were later confirmed to be October 9–11, which coincided with the 80th anniversary of the host country's Workers' Party of Korea. This visit was at the invitation of Kim Jong Un, as confirmed by the Vietnamese Ministry of Foreign Affairs, and it was deemed successful. Kim Jong Un welcomed the General Secretary Tô Lâm on October 9, 2025, marking the first visit by Tô Lâm while holding the supreme leadership position of the Communist Party of Vietnam. The visit also marked the 75th anniversary of diplomatic relations between North Korea and Vietnam.

== Diplomatic representatives ==
=== North Korea ambassadors to Vietnam ===
North Korea ambassadors to North Vietnam

1. So Chol (1955–1958)
2. Jon Chang Chol (1958–1962)
3. Ma Dong San (1962–?)

North Korea ambassadors to Vietnam

1. Ri Hong (1988–1993)
2. Ri Hong (1998–2002)
3. Ma Chol Su (2006–2010)
4. Kim Chang Il (2010–2015)
5. Kim Myong Gil (2015–2019)
6. Ri Sung Guk (2024–present)

=== Vietnamese ambassadors to North Korea ===
North Vietnam ambassadors to North Korea

1. Hoàng Văn Hoan (1950–1957, resident in Beijing)
2. Trần Xuân Độ (1957–1963)
3. Lê Thiết Hùng (1963–1970)
4. Bùi Đình Đổng (1970)
5. Lê Đông (1970–1974)
6. Lê Quang Khải (1974–1976)

Vietnam ambassadors to North Korea

1. Lê Quang Khải (1976–1977)
2. Nguyễn Giáp (1983–1986)
3. Dương Chính Thức (1992–1996)
4. Đỗ Thị Hòa (2000–2004)
5. Lê Văn Cự (2007–2010)
6. Lê Quảng Ba (2011–2014)
7. Phạm Việt Hùng (2014–2018)
8. Lê Bá Vinh (2018–2026)
9. Doãn Khánh Tâm (2026–present)

== See also ==
- Koreans in Vietnam
- South Korea–Vietnam relations
- Vietnamese people in Korea
