= Lai Đại Hàn =

People born to Vietnamese mothers and Korean soldiers during the Vietnam War

Lai Đại Hàn ([laːi ɗâˀi hâːn]; Korean: 라이따이한) (Note: Also Lai Daihan or Lai Tai Han in English.) is a term used in the Vietnamese language to refer to a person who was born to a Vietnamese mother and a South Korean father during the Vietnam War. In Vietnamese, the word “Lai” means mixed-ethnicity and “Đại Hàn” is an obsolete term for Korea. The births of these people occurred because of South Korean involvement in the Vietnam War; approximately 350,000 South Korean soldiers were deployed to South Vietnam between 1964 and 1973. It is a politically significant term with regard to South Korea–Vietnam relations and carries a heavy social stigma due to the fact that wartime sexual violence was endemic in Vietnam when these people were conceived. An unknown number of Lai Đại Hàn births were the result of pregnancies from rape. The community has faced unequal and discriminatory treatment from the Vietnamese government, while the South Korean government has refused to acknowledge and address the rape of Vietnamese women during the conflict.

== Etymology ==
A 2010 article in the academic journal Pacific Affairs followed the phrase "Lai Daihan" with the following in parentheses: "(the) children of South Korean fathers and Vietnamese women during the Vietnam War".

The noun or adjective lai (chữ Nôm: 𤳆) can mean any hybrid, including an animal or tree, but in this context is pejorative, meaning "mixed-blood". "Đại Hàn" (chữ Hán: 大韓) was the standard Vietnamese term for South Korea (the Sino-Vietnamese equivalent of Korean: 대한; Hanja: 大韓; RR: Daehan), although today "Hàn Quốc" (chữ Hán: 韓國; Korean: 한국; Hanja: 韓國; RR: Hanguk) is more common. Since "lai" is offensive the term "lai Đại Hàn" itself does not appear in official Vietnamese sources, except in relation for example to the name of the South Korean film "Lai Đại Hàn."

== Issue of sexual consent during conception ==
=== Prevalence of rape of Vietnamese women ===
The number of Lai Dai Han that were born as a result of rape of South Vietnamese women by South Korean troops remains under debate. According to Susumu Nomura, roughly 90% of Lai Dai Han cases resulted from South Korean troops and businessmen engaged in consensual relationships with Vietnamese women, but were forced to leave after the departure of South Korean forces from South Vietnam in early 1973 or during the Fall of Saigon in 1975.

The exact number of Lai Dai Han is unknown. According to Busan Ilbo, there are at least 5,000 and as many as 30,000. According to Maeil Business, however, there are 1,000 at least. A 1998 paper which was cited in a 2015 paper said that the South Korean government put the number of Lai Dai Han at 1,500.

There were estimated to be 800 mothers of Lai Dai Han conceived due to rape who were still alive in 2015, from a petition calling for an apology from the Korean government.

==== Reports and testimonies ====
An August 16, 2013 article in PRI said that South Korean Defense Ministry spokesman, Kwon Ki-hyeon, stated that "Such intentional, organized and systemized civilian massacres by the Korean army are impossible. If such an incident did exist, it would have been exposed and made public a long time ago. The Republic of Korea fought in Vietnam to stop the Communization of a free South Vietnam. Since our army executed our mission under strict rules, there was no sexual exploitation of Vietnamese women." The article also noted that "Historians agree that Korean troops fathered a large number of mixed Korean-Vietnamese children called Lai Dai Han. But it remains unclear the extent to which this was battlefield rape versus prostitution."

An April 25, 2015 article in The Hankyoreh stated that Kim Nak-yeong, who was a staff sergeant at Bình Khê in Bình Định Province, South Vietnam from May 1971 to June 1972 said, "Some of the units didn't cause any problems because they were strictly instructed not to do harm to civilians. However, I heard a lot of talk about brutal sexual assaults taking place throughout the operation zones, and my understanding is that there's a definite possibility it was true." The article also reported quotes from the interviews of ten elderly Vietnamese women who said to be victims of sexual assaults perpetrated by the South Korean military during the Vietnam War in Bình Định Province. One stated that, "Four people took turns doing it to me one at a time", and another was quoted as saying, "They'd put one person at a time in the trench, keep me there all day and night and just rape me again and again".

An October 30, 2016, article in The Hankyoreh said that Jang Ui-seong, head of the Vietnam Veterans' Association of Korea (VVAK), was representing 831 plaintiffs in a defamation lawsuit against Ku Su-jeong for her 2014 interview in the Japanese newspaper Shūkan Bunshun, 2016 interview in The Hankyoreh and statements she made in a video. According to the article, the VVAK denied Ku's research of the South Korean military's conduct during the Vietnam War by saying that "all" of it had been "falsehoods and forgeries". The VVAK continued by saying its veterans have said that "all" of the victims were "Viet Cong disguised as civilians" and that "no sexual violence occurred". Ku's research is backed by interviews of Vietnamese people, "documentation from several investigations by the Vietnamese government", 60 Vietnam War victim memorials in Vietnam, and three Vietnam War "memorials of hatred to South Korean troops". The article said that Ku had as evidence "33 different official documents", several of which were from the "US military command in Vietnam from 1968 to 1970".

=== Impact on Korean society ===
Stephen Epstein, Director of the Asian Studies Programme at the Victoria University of Wellington, said that "Korea's legacy in Vietnam encompasses feelings of guilt, especially in a very concrete manifestation: thousands of children of mixed Korean-Vietnamese descent, the Lai Dai Han, a significant proportion of whom were abandoned by their fathers."

A 25 April 2015 article in The Hankyoreh said that Yoon Mi-hyang, president of The Korean Council for the Women Drafted for Military Sexual Slavery by Japan, said the following while addressing the elderly Vietnamese women she had interviewed who said to have been sexually assaulted by the South Korean military during the Vietnam War, "I can't think of anything I can say to all of you. We were innocent victims too, but hearing now that Vietnamese women were victimized by us Koreans, we feel mortified and sorry as Koreans. That is why we intend to combine our strength and raise the Butterfly Fund to provide some small help to the victims." The Butterfly Fund was started on March 8, 2012, to help people who experience sexual violence during times of war. A 2015 article in The Hankyoreh said, "Now it's time for Seoul to sit down with Vietnamese authorities to find out the truth not only about the civilian massacres that took place during the Vietnam War, but also about the extent of military authorities' involvement in operating and managing "welfare stations" for their troops - and to take appropriate follow-up action."

== Discrimination within Vietnam ==
After the war, the mothers of Lai Dai Han were accused of being collaborators with enemy countries, and were deprived of property, ideologically educated, and imprisoned.

The Lai Dai Han community has been facing social exclusion due to their "mixed ethnicity". It has been reported that many cannot read or write, with most not having access to basic health and education services. In addition to living with "stigma, shame and prejudice", the community also faces acute poverty as of 2020.

A March 27, 2020, article in BBC News details some testimonies of the women of the Lai Dai Han community, who reported that their children "have faced a lifetime of abuse and discrimination, mocked for being Lai Dai Han".

== Legacy ==
=== Memorials ===
An April 27, 2016, article in Tuổi Trẻ said that artists Kim Seo-kyung and Kim Eun-sung would show their Vietnam Pieta statue on May 4, 2016, to the Korean-Vietnamese Peace Foundation. This Vietnam Pieta statue would be used as a model for two statues: one statue that would go in Vietnam and one statue that would go in South Korea. The Vietnam Pieta statue depicted a mother holding a child, and the statue was reminiscent of the Pietà statue from the fifteenth century. The two artists said that the Vietnam Pieta statue was intended to convey a "message of apology and repentance of the South Korean people" to the Vietnamese people for the lives of the Vietnamese people that were lost in "massacres" by the South Korean military with particular focus on the children who were massacred by the South Korean military.

A January 16, 2016, article in The Hankyoreh said that the Kim Seo-gyeong and Kim Woon-seong, the two artists who made the Vietnam Pieta statue, did an interview on January 12, 2016. In that interview, the two artists said that "The South Korean government must demand and it must receive an exact apology from the Japanese government about the issue of the comfort women. Likewise, it must make an exact apology for the massacre of civilians during the Vietnam War. The government isn't fulfilling its role on either of these things right now".

An October 12, 2016 news article reported that the Danang Museum received the "Pieta Vietnam" statue on October 11, 2016, along with 51 other items. These included thirty photographs about a South Korean movement called "An apology to Vietnam", books about the Vietnam War, documentary videos about the Vietnam War, and six pictures that memorialized people who were massacred by South Korean military forces during the Vietnam War.

In June 2018 the Mother and Child by British artist Rebecca Hawkins was unveiled in Church House, Westminster and is sited in St James's Square to stand and speak for the women and their children of the Lai Dai Han, and all victims of sexual violence in conflict around the world. The sculpture was commissioned by the campaign, Justice for Lai Dai Han.

=== Calls for apologies from South Korea ===
Korean President Apology Timeline

←	Kim Dae-jung's apology

←	letter & petition to Park

←	letter to Moon

Vietnam War
South Korea in the Vietnam War
Park Geun-hye presidency
Kim Dae-jung presidency
Park Chung-hee presidency
Moon Jae-in presidency

On August 23, 2001, South Korean President Kim Dae-jung expressed his condolences for violence that South Korea unintentionally committed against the Vietnamese people during the Vietnam War, stating "I am sorry about the fact that we took part in an unfortunate war and unintentionally created pain for the people of Vietnam." and pledged to continue support of Vietnam's national development by giving $19,600,000 of South Korea's Economic Development Cooperation Fund (EDCF) to the "solid waste treatment business". The International Policy Digest described Kim's statement as an "indirect apology".

On October 14, 2015, a letter signed by ten Vietnamese women who said they were raped by the South Korean military during the Vietnam War signed a letter to be delivered to Ban Ki-moon, Secretary General of the United Nations, asking for a "formal apology".

On October 19, 2015, a petition with close to 29,000 signatures asked South Korean president Park Geun-hye for a formal apology from the South Korean government for the systematic rape and sexual assault done by South Korean soldiers to Vietnamese women during the Vietnam War. An October 27, 2015, news article said that United States politician Norm Coleman requested on October 13, 2015, for South Korean president Park Geun-hye to make a public apology for the Vietnamese women who were raped by the South Korean military during the Vietnam War. Coleman said, "What happened to these women, so many of whom lost their innocence at the hands of South Korean soldiers, is one of the great untold tragedies of the Vietnam War".

On June 9, 2017, the Vietnamese government lodged an official protest with the South Korea Embassy regarding President Moon Jae-in honored veterans those who fought in the Vietnam War in a speech on South Korea's Memorial Day, June 8, 2017. "We request the government of South Korea not to take actions or make statements that could hurt the Vietnamese people or negatively affect the two countries' friendly relations," Vietnam's foreign ministry spokesperson Lê Thị Thu Hằng said in a statement.

On June 10, 2019, some members of Justice for Lai Dai Han delivered a letter by hand to be delivered to Prime Minister Theresa May regarding the Lai Dai Han.

A June 19, 2020, article in The Independent said that "the government of South Korea has never recognized or investigated the allegations of sexual violence made by the Lai Dai Han".

=== Education and awareness ===
A 2016 article in Daily Kos said that several Asian-American groups have asked California's Instructional Quality Commission to include what South Korea's military did during the Vietnam War into school textbooks, but it said that handling the issue of "sexual violence" would be a "delicate task".

In the late 1990s after the story of Lai Dai Han emerged in Korea, a charity fraud involving a fundraising campaign intended to teach Lai Dai Han the Korean language and culture had defrauded Korean donors.

== Comparisons to Japan's Korean "comfort women" ==
In a Japanese magazine article by a Tokyo Broadcasting System writer Noriyuki Yamaguchi alleged that comfort women facilities were set up and operated by Korean forces during the war. The article said that in July 2014, Yamaguchi found a letter to Korean General Chae Myung-shin from the US military command in Saigon that appeared to have been written sometime from January 1969 to April 1969 . The article by Noriyuki Yamaguchi alleges that comfort stations were operated by South Koreans much in the same way that comfort women facilities were used by Japanese forces, and accused Park Geun-hye of hypocrisy for highlighting the human rights issues around comfort women while not paying attention to this fact.

A September 4, 2016, opinion piece in The Korea Times discussed the issue of whether or not there were Vietnamese "comfort women" during the Vietnam War, focusing on the term "comfort women" in its analysis. The article said that despite reports of sexual assaults done to South Vietnamese women by the South Korean military during the Vietnam War, the situation is not analogous as there had been no reports of "recruitment, transportation, housing and supplies, management, payment and the post-war dealings with victims" of a comfort women operation as part of a "formal military policy". Because what South Korea did during the Vietnam War did not meet this criterion, the article classified South Korea as not having done a "comfort women" operation during the Vietnam War.

The August 16, 2013, PRI news article said that far-right Japanese nationalists were accusing South Korea of hypocrisy, because Japan had paid and apologized for their comfort women system it perpetrated during World War II, which is likened by some as sexual exploitation, yet South Korea had not done the same in regard to the rape perpetrated by Korean soldiers during the Vietnam War. The article said that Japanese nationalists said South Korea had a systematic rape operation during the Vietnam War which was similar to Japan's systematic comfort women operation during World War II.

A June 16, 2016, article in the Daily Kos said that South Korea has been "very vocal" about the agony Koreans endured from Japan during World War II, pressing for apology and compensation from Japanese prime ministers at different points in time for what Japan did to South Korea during World War II, and the article described this as being done "ironically" in light of what the South Korean military did to other countries' civilians. The article said that "brutal killings, rapes and heinous acts" done by the South Korean military during the Vietnam War have now been unearthed. Referring to South Korea's actions during the Vietnam War, the article said that South Korean president Park Geun-hye should admit to the "historical truths of her country's detestable behavior", and the article said that president Park should be "like Japan" and give an apology and compensation to the victims of what the South Korean military did during the Vietnam War.

A September 1, 2017, article on Justice for Lai Dai Han's website said, "In an audacious display of dishonesty and hypocrisy, Seoul is always quick to highlight the suffering of its own people during past conflicts, but develops a severe case of national amnesia when facing its own crimes in Vietnam." Another article posted on September 11, 2017, on the website mentions that although the Lai Dai Han "were the product of war crimes of the South Korean troops, they do not have compensation and they never received a formal official apology".

== See also ==
- South Korea in the Vietnam War
  - Rape during the Vietnam War
- Kopino, a person born to a Filipina mother and a Korean father after the latter abandons the former
- KoreKorea, a young Kiribati girl who has sex with Korean fishermen
- Comfort women, the Korean sex slaves of Japanese soldiers during World War II
- Wartime sexual violence
  - Raptio, the phenomenon of combatants taking women as prizes during armed conflicts
- War children
  - Amerasian, a person born to an Asian mother and an American soldier
  - Rhineland Bastard, a person born to a German mother/father and an African mother/father
  - Lebensborn e.V., an elaborate German eugenics program to produce healthy "Aryan" children during World War II
  - Brides of the Islamic State, a list of foreign women who immigrated to Iraq and Syria to produce children with local Muslim jihadists
