= South Korea–Vietnam relations =

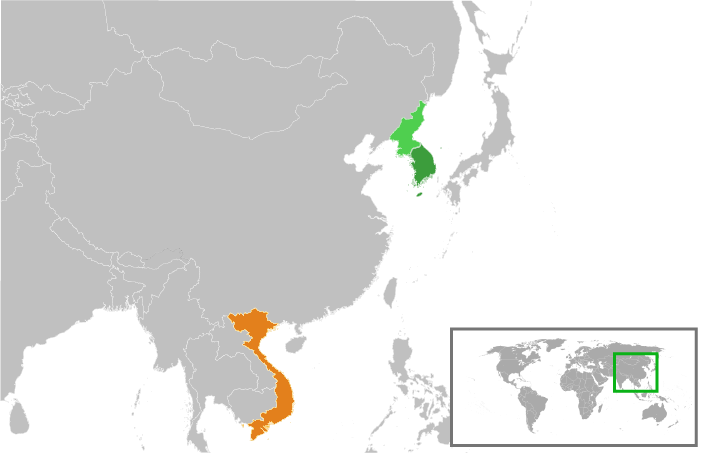
- South Korea: Vietnam

Diplomatic mission
- South Korean embassy, Hanoi: Vietnamese embassy, Seoul

South Korea–South Vietnam relations
- South Korea: South Vietnam

Diplomatic mission
- South Korean embassy, Saigon: South Vietnamese embassy, Seoul

South Korea and Vietnam established formal diplomatic relations on 22 December 1992, though the two countries had already had various historical contacts long before that. According to Vietnamese Prime Minister Phan Văn Khải, "The Republic of Korea is a very important partner of Vietnam and a good model for Vietnam to expand cooperation and exchange experiences during its development process." On 2022, South Korea and Vietnam upgraded their relationship in to "comprehensive strategic partnership", became the fourth country after China, Russia and India to do so.

== History ==
In ancient times, Korea and Vietnam were within the Sinosphere and share the same Confucian ethical philosophy. Ch'oe Ch'i-wŏn (857-?), a Silla official wrote "borders of Jiaozhi" and the Protectorate of Annam. Semi-official encounters regularly happened when envoys from both countries met in Beijing.

The last remaining survivors of the Lý dynasty had fled to Korea following Trần Thủ Độ's total massacre of the Lý family. One of famous Lý survivors was Lý Long Tường, who later helped to defeat the Mongol invasions of Korea. During the First Indochina War, South Korea had recognized the State of Vietnam while North Korea had recognized the Democratic Republic of Vietnam.

== Vietnam War ==
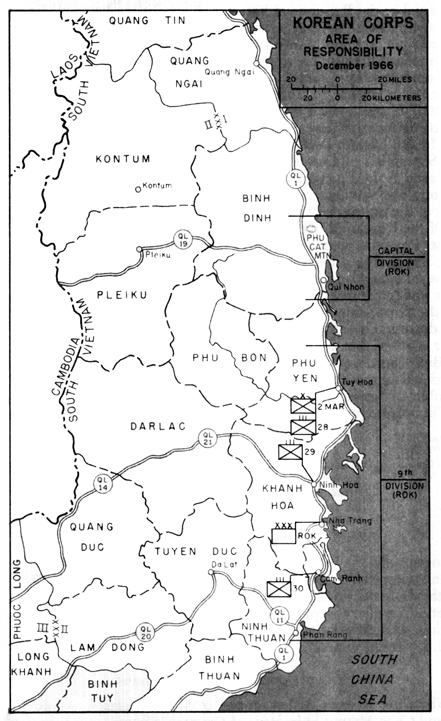
The areas of responsibility of the South Korean army in Vietnam as of December 1966

Both North and South Korea lent material and manpower support to their respective ideological allies during the Vietnam War, though the number of South Korean troops on the ground was larger. Then-South Korean president Syngman Rhee had offered to send troops to Vietnam as early as 1954, but his proposal was turned down by the U.S. Department of State; the first South Korean personnel to land in Vietnam, 10 years later, were non-combatants: ten Taekwondo instructors, along with thirty-four officers and ninety-six enlisted men of a Korean Army hospital unit.

In total, between 1965 and 1973, 312,853 South Korean soldiers fought in Vietnam; Vietnam's Ministry of Culture and Communications in an unofficial investigation estimated they killed 41,400 enemy fighters and 5,000 civilians. After the Vietnam war, there were thousands of children of mixed Korean and Vietnamese descent, called Lai Dai Han, born of Korean workers or soldiers and local Vietnamese. Reportedly, many resulted from widespread "My Lai-style massacres" that involved the rape of Vietnamese Women by South Korean soldiers. Various civil society groups continue to hope for a formal investigation and apology into these events.

In 2001, South Korean president Kim Dae-jung expressed his sorrow that Korea had unintentionally inflicted pain upon the Vietnamese people during the Vietnam War. He also promised to continue supporting Vietnamese development.

As stated by Vietnamese president Trần Đức Lương in 2004:

Nevertheless, with the tradition of tolerance, humanity and peace and friendship, Vietnam's policy in dealing with issues left behind by history is to put aside the past, look forward to the future and cooperate for shared development. The ROK also shares the understanding that sincere and effective cooperation with Vietnam in addressing the consequences of the war is a matter of morality and a practical way to overcome the complex about the past. We highly appreciate the fact that the ROK's Government, mass organizations and individuals have carried out many activities aimed at and made concrete contributions to helping Vietnam's reconstruction and development efforts. In just over 10 years since the establishment of diplomatic relations, Vietnam and the ROK have become each other's important partner. The two countries share cultural and historical similarities well as that of national construction built on people's creativeness.

In 2009, South Korea and Vietnam agreed to lift the bilateral relationship to the “comprehensive partnership”. In 2003, readers of South Korean newspaper Hankyoreh, which ran a series of articles exposing atrocities committed by South Korean troops during the war, donated over US$100,000 to set up a memorial park and peace museum in Phú Yên Province. Former South Korean soldiers such as Ahn Junghyo and Hwang Sok-yong have also written novels about their experiences in Vietnam.

In 2017, Moon Jae-in apologised vaguely to Vietnam, although the issue was minimized by the Vietnamese media and South Korean media as it wasn't seen as an official apology, and South Korean civil groups and individuals have also taken a pro-active effort in reconciliation.

In 2023, a South Korean court ruled in favor of a Vietnamese victim of South Korean atrocities during the war and ordered that the South Korean government compensate the surviving victim. In response, the South Korean government, via its President Yoon Suk-Yeol, repeated its earlier denials of the atrocities, and the South Korean government later announced its appeal of the decision. This strained relations with Vietnam, as a spokesperson for Vietnam's foreign ministry called South Korea's repeated denials "extremely regrettable".

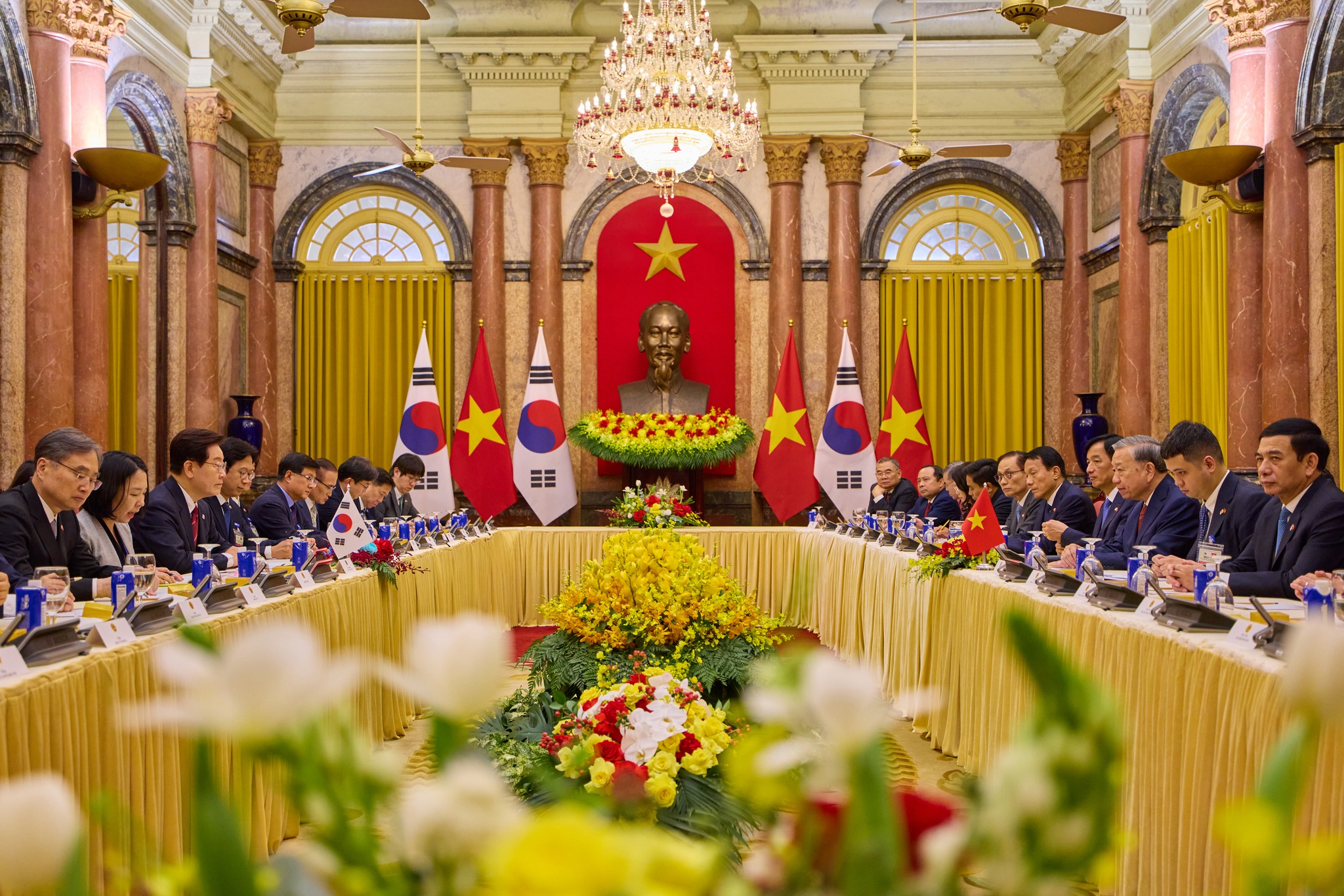
South Korean and Vietnamese leaders, including Lee Jae Myung and Tô Lâm, meet in April 2026

President Lee Jae Myung is critical of South Korean war crimes during the Vietnam War, even comparing them to the Japanese atrocities in Korea. The South Korean President has reportedly planned to publicly address the issue with Vietnam, however, the Vietnamese side privately turned down Lee's intention, citing its greater emphasis on future collaborations instead of talking about the painful past.

== ROKS Cheonan sinking ==
In the aftermath of the controversial 2006 North Korean nuclear test, Foreign Ministry Spokesman Le Dzung expressed the Vietnamese Government's grave concern over the test, stating that it will heighten tensions and threaten the region's stability, and stated that Vietnam supports the "denuclearization" of the Korean peninsula. After the ROKS Cheonan sinking of 2010, Foreign Ministry Spokeswoman Nguyen Phuong Nga said: "The sinking of Cheonan is a regrettable incident. The Government of Vietnam expresses its heart-felt condolences to the Government of the Republic of Korea for the loss of lives in the sinking. Vietnam has attentively and closely been following the current developments in the Korean Peninsula. Vietnam consistently and persistently supports peace, stability in the Korean Peninsula, and favors dialogue for peaceful settlement of all matters. Vietnam wishes that parties concerned could exercise restraint for the sake of peace, stability in the Korean Peninsula and in the region."

== Trade and investment ==
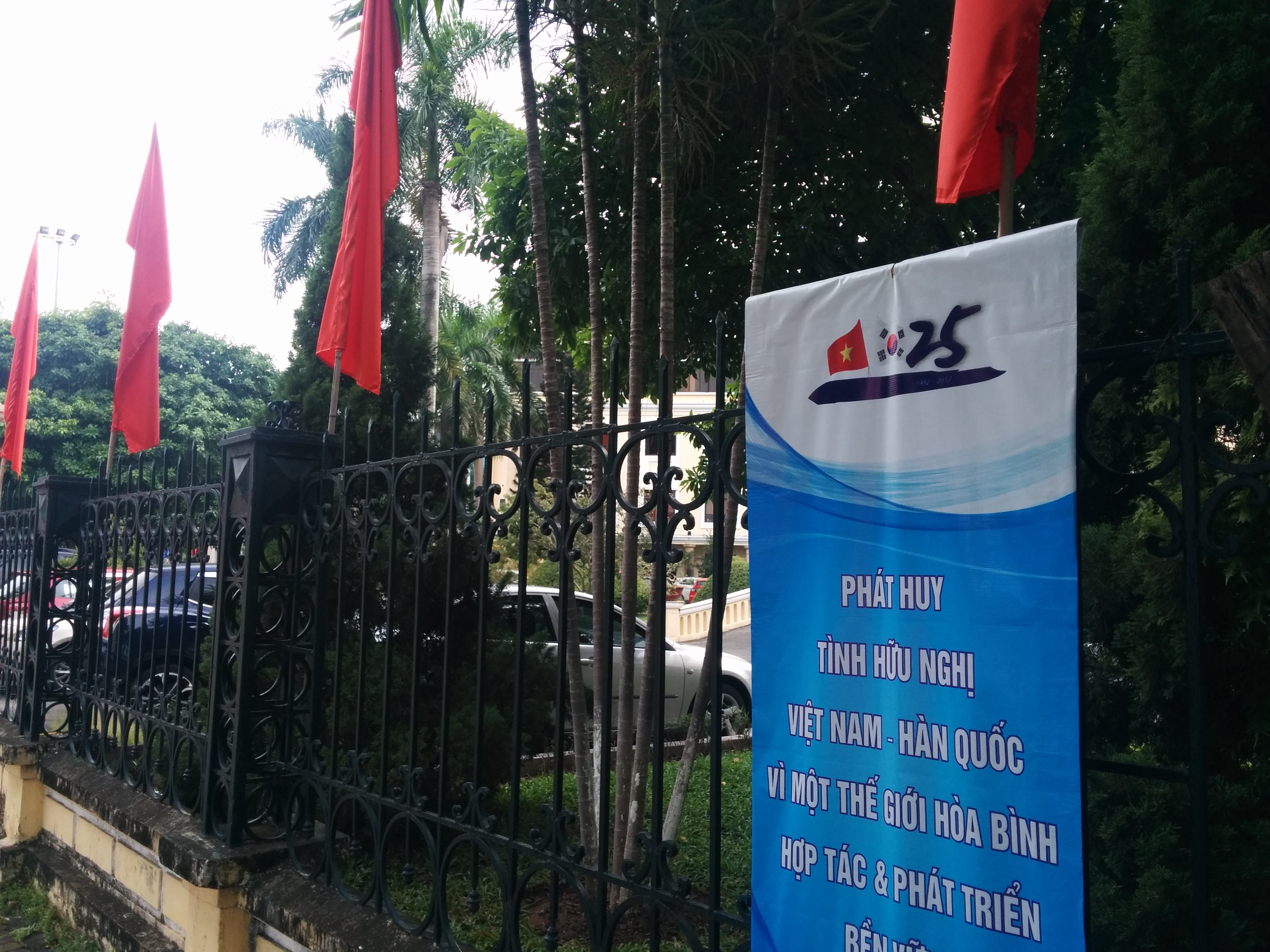
Banner in Hanoi celebrating the 25 years of diplomatic ties

Four years after the 1992 normalisation of diplomatic ties, South Korea was already annually conducting $1.3 billion of trade with Vietnam, making them Vietnam's third-largest trading partner; they were also the fourth-largest foreign investor after Taiwan, Japan, and Hong Kong, having put $1.987 billion into Vietnam. The pace of their investment roughly doubled over the next ten years; in the first five months of 2006, new South Korean investment in Vietnam totalled to around $400 million, and roughly one thousand Korean companies had operations in the country.

Currently, South Korea is Vietnam's third largest export market, as well as its largest foreign investor, with its accumulative registered capital reaching $78.5 billion USD. South Korean Electronics conglomerate Samsung has invested $18 billion USD into Vietnam and has promised to invest more in the future.

== South Korean company ==
As of 2021, there were approximately 9,000 South Korean companies operating in Vietnam, representing 18.5% of Vietnam's total FDI capital.

=== Samsung ===
Samsung entered the Vietnamese market in 1996. Samsung has six factories across Vietnam. They are creating jobs for hundreds of thousands of the country's workers. As of 2020, Samsung accounted for 25 percent of Vietnam's gross domestic product. Samsung Electronics has been Vietnam's largest foreign investor.

=== LG Electronics ===
LG Electronics has three factories in Vietnam.

=== Lotte ===
Lotte entered the Vietnamese market in 1996. It maintains localized operations of its subsidiaries which include Lotte Mart, Lotte Cinema, Lotte Entertainment (for localized distribution of its films and TV shows), Lotteria, and Lotte Center.

=== CJ ===
CJ's Vietnam branch was established in 2004. It maintains localized operations and distributions from a wide range of CJ's businesses and brands, which include CJ Entertainment, CJ CGV, CJ ENM (for localized distribution of its films and TV series), CJ Food, etc.

== Movement of people ==
As of 2009 there are nearly a hundred thousand each of Koreans in Vietnam and Vietnamese people in South Korea.

== Tourism ==
As of 2018, South Korean tourists accounted for 3,485,406 tourists in Vietnam, second only to China (4,966,468 tourists). Flights from South Korea accounted for a remarkable 44.5 per cent of the country's inbound traffic in 2018. Da Nang, and Hoi An are the top destinations that South Korean Tourists visit.

== Diplomatic missions ==
Of Vietnam

- Seoul (Embassy)

Of South Korea

- Hanoi (Embassy)
- Ho Chi Minh City (Consulate)

=== South Korea Ambassadors to Vietnam ===
South Korea Ambassadors to South Vietnam

1. Choe Deok-sin (1956–1958, Minister)
2. Choe Deok-sin (1958–1961)
3. Pak Tongjin (1961–1962)
4. Shin Sang-chul (1962–1970)
5. Yoo Yang-soo (1971–1974)
6. Kim Young-kwan (1974–1975, until the Fall of Saigon)

South Korea Ambassadors to Vietnam

1. Park Noh-soo (1992–1994)
2. Kim Bong-kyu (1994–1997)
3. Cho Won-il (1997–2000)
4. Paik Nak-hwan (2000–2003)
5. Yoo Tae-hyun (2003–2005)
6. Kim Eui-ki (2005–2007)
7. Im Hong-jae (2007–2010)
8. Park Suk-hwan (2010–2011)
9. Ha Chan-ho (2011–2013)
10. Jun Dae-joo (2013–2016)
11. Lee Hyuk (2016–2018)
12. Kim Do-hyun (2018–2019)
13. Park Noh-wan (2019–2022)
14. Oh Young-ju (2022–2023)
15. Choi Young-sam (2023–present)

=== Vietnamese Ambassadors to South Korea ===
South Vietnam Ambassadors to South Korea

1. Dương Văn Đức (1956–1957, Minister)
2. Nguyễn Quí Anh (1957–1964, Chargé d'affaires)
3. Ngô Tôn Đạt (1964–1966, Chargé d'affaires)
4. Ngô Tôn Đạt (1966–1967)
5. Đỗ Cao Trí (1967–1968)
6. Đặng Ngọc Diêu (1968–1969, Chargé d'affaires)
7. Phạm Xuân Chiểu (1969–1975, until the Fall of Saigon)

Vietnam Ambassadors to South Korea

1. Nguyễn Phú Bình (1993–1997)
2. Nguyễn Văn Xương (1997–2001)
3. Dương Chính Thức (2001–2005)
4. Phạm Tiến Vân (2005–2010)
5. Trần Trọng Toàn (2010–2013)
6. Phạm Hữu Chí (2013–2017)
7. Nguyễn Vũ Tú (2017–2020)
8. Nguyễn Vũ Tùng (2020–2024)
9. Vũ Hồ (2024–present)

In June 2023, then South Korean President Yoon Suk-yeol visited Vietnam at the invitation of then Vietnamese President Võ Văn Thưởng, aimed at improving bilateral ties related to economic and other issues.

== See also ==
- Foreign relations of South Korea
- Indo-Pacific Strategy of South Korea
- Korean language education in Vietnam
- Foreign relations of Vietnam
- Park Hang-seo
- Vietnamese people in Korea
