= Shin (Korean surname) =

"Shin" or "Sin"

- Hangul: 신
- Hanja: 申; 辛; 愼
- RR: Sin
- MR: Sin
- IPA: [ɕin]

Shin is a Korean surname. Other rarer romanizations of this surname include Sin or Sheen.

== Clans ==
There are three Chinese characters that can be read as Shin. Between these three characters, there are seven different Korean clans, each of which descends from a different ancestral founder. Two of the six, the Yeongsan Shin clan and the Geochang Shin clan, both trace their origins back to China. Members of the various Shin clans can be found throughout the Korean Peninsula.

As with other Korean family names, the holders of the "Shin" family name are divided into various clans, each known by the name of a town or city, called bon-gwan in Korean. Usually that town or city is the one where the clan's founder lived. The six Shin branches are as follows:

- Pyongsan Shin clan
- Goryeong Shin clan (高靈 申)
- Aju Shin clan (鵝洲 申)
- Saknyeong Shin clan (朔寧 申)
- Yeongsan Shin clan
- Geochang Shin clan

Although the first four clans — Pyongsan, Goryeong, Aju, and Saknyeong — share the same Chinese character (申), they are unrelated in heritage.

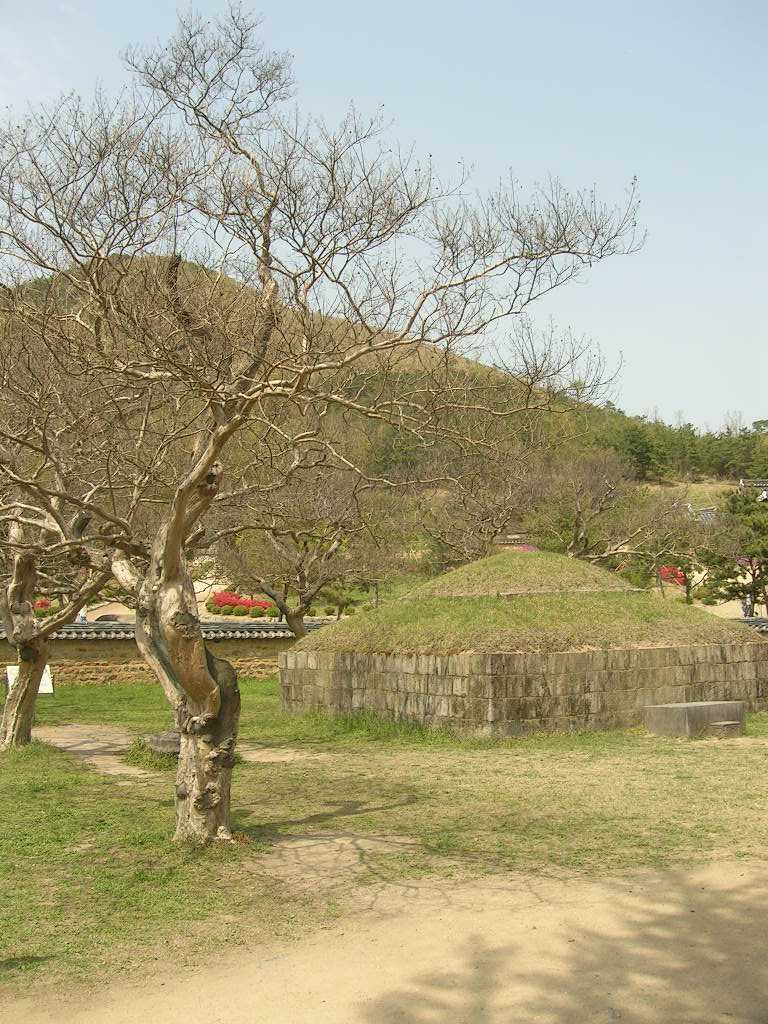
Shrine of Shin Sung-gyeom in northern Daegu.

The Pyongsan Shin clan lineage makes up about 70% of all those with the surname Shin using the Chinese character 申. The clan's founder was General Sin Sung-gyŏm. This clan associated with a mountain in North Korea called "Pyongsan" (平山, literally "mountain of peace"). Sin Sung-gyŏm was originally named Samneungsan (三能山, literally "mountain of three talents"), without a family name, before being granted the Sin surname by King Taejo of Goryeo.

According to the Pyongsan Shin family legend, one day when King Taejo and his generals went out hunting near Pyeongsan, Taejo saw three geese flying above, and asked his generals whether any of them could shoot the geese down. Sin Sung-gyŏm volunteered and asked Taejo which one he should shoot. Taejo asked Shin to shoot the third goose in its left wing and, to Taejo's surprise, Sin successfully felled the goose. Highly impressed, Taejo gifted Sin with 300 gyeol (결; 結, an ancient measurement of area) of local land, which became Sin's hometown.

Sin Sung-gyŏm also saved the life of King Taejo of Goryeo during a disastrous battle with Later Baekje near present-day Daegu in the early 10th century. Taejo awarded General Sin the clan name Pyongsan Sin, after his hometown, for the loyalty and bravery he showed in the battle. Other prominent members of this clan include the 16th-century artist, writer, and poet Shin Saimdang and the 19th-century pansori writer Shin Jae-hyo.

Every year, a number of descendants of the Pyongsan Shin clan gather at the memorial shrine of Sin Sung-gyŏm in the South Korean province of Gangwon Province. Prior to the Korean War, the original shrine was situated in the now North-Korean province of Hwanghae Province, to which the clan land of Pyeongsan traces its roots.

Another well-known family line that also uses the Hanja character 申 is the Goryeong Shin clan, descended from Sin Sukchu, the lead scholar working with King Sejong the Great in the development of Hangul, the Korean written language. Sin Sukchu was also a high ranking government minister and belonged to the Hall of Worthies. The Goryeong Shin lineage makes up about 17% of all those with the surname (申). Three of five members of Sin Sukchu's 16th generation are known to have immigrated to the United States in the 1970s, such as the physician David Sheen. Another prominent member of the clan is Danjae Shin Chaeho, a 19th-century nationalist historian.

== Notable people ==
=== Historical ===
- Sin Sung-gyŏm (died 927), general of the Later Three Kingdoms period
- Sin Ton (1322–1371), Buddhist monk and regent of the reign of King Gongmin of Goryeo
- Sin Sukchu (1417–1475), Joseon politician
- Sin Saimdang (1504–1551), Joseon artist, writer, calligraphist, poet
- Shin Ryu (1619–1680), Joseon general
- Shin Gye-am (fl. 1620s–1630s), Jurchen and Manchu interpreter
- Sin Kwangsu (1712–1775), Joseon poet
- Sin Yunbok (1758–1813), Joseon painter
- Shin Jae-hyo (1812–1884), Joseon pansori theorist and writer
- Sin Sun-seong (1878–1944), Imperial Korean Navy captain
- Shin Gyu-sik (1880–1922), Korean independence activist
- Shin Chae-ho (1880–1936), Korean independence activist and historian
- Shin Pal-gyun (1882–1924), Korean independence activist
- Shin Song-mo (1891–1960), South Korean independence activist and politician
- Sin Ik-hui (1894–1956), South Korean independence activist and politician

=== Contemporary ===
- Shin A-lam (born 1986), South Korean épée fencer, Olympic silver medalist
- Shin A-young (born 1987), South Korean television personality
- Shin Ae-ra (born 1969), South Korean actress
- Albert Shin, Canadian filmmaker
- Shin Baek-cheol (born 1989), South Korean badminton player
- Shin Bo-ra (born 1987), South Korean comedian, singer, actress
- Shin Bong-shik (born 1992), South Korean snowboarder
- Shin Bong-sun (born 1980), South Korean comedian
- Sin Byung-ho (born 1977), South Korean former footballer
- Shin Byung-kook (born 1978), South Korean biathlete
- Shin Che-bon (born 1971), South Korean former footballer
- Shin Cheol-jin (born 1956), South Korean actor
- Shin Choon-ho (1930–2021), South Korean businessman, founder of Nongshim
- Shin Da-eun (born 1985), South Korean actress
- Shin Da-hae (born 1988), South Korean snowboarder
- Shin Daechul (born 1967), South Korean rock/heavy metal guitarist and leader of Sinawe
- Shin Dalja (born 1943), South Korean poet
- Shin Dam-yeong (born 1993), South Korean footballer
- Shin Dong-bin (born 1956), Japanese-born South Korean businessman
- Shin Dong-gab (stage name The Quiett, born 1985), South Korean rapper, composer, lyricist, record producer
- Shin Dong-ho (born 1994), South Korean singer, former member of boy band U-KISS
- Shin Dong-hee (stage name Shindong, born 1985), singer, dancer, member of boy band Super Junior
- Shin Dong-hyuk (born 1980 or 1982), North Korean defector and human rights activist
- Shin Dong-il (born 1968), South Korean film director and scriptwriter
- Shin Dong-in (born 1994), South Korean cyclist
- Shin Dong-keun (born 1981), South Korean footballer
- Shin Dong-kun (born 1961), South Korean dentist and politician
- Shin Dong-mi (born 1977), South Korean actress
- Shin Dong-min (born 2005), South Korean short-track speed skater
- Shin Dong-pa (born 1944), South Korean basketball coach and former player
- Sin Dong-ui (born 1941), South Korean wrestler
- Shin Dong-woo (stage name CNU, born 1991), South Korean singer and actor, member of boy group B1A4
- Shin Dong-woo (born 1998), South Korean actor
- Shin Dong-wook (born 1982), South Korean actor
- Shin Dong-yeol (stage name Bill Stax, born 1980), South Korean rapper
- Shin Dong-yup (poet) (1930–1969), South Korean poet
- Shin Dong-yup (entertainer) (born 1971), South Korean comedian and host
- Eddie Shin (born 1976), American actor
- Sin Eui-hyun (born 1980), South Korean male cross-country skier and biathlete
- Shin Eui-kyung (1898–1988), South Korean educator, independence activist, politician
- Shin Eui-son (born Valeri Sarychev, 1960), Tajik-born South Korean footballer
- Shin Eun-chul (born 1973), South Korean retired amateur boxer
- Shin Eun-joo (born 1993), South Korean handball player
- Shin Eun-jung (born 1974), South Korean actress
- Shin Eun-kyung (born 1973), South Korean actress
- Shin Eun-mi (born 1961), Korean-American classical singer and writer
- Shin Eun-soo (born 2002), South Korean actress
- Shin Gabee (born 1993), South Korean dancer and choreographer
- Shin Goo (born 1936), South Korean actor
- Shin Gwang-il (born 1997), South Korean singer and musician, member of band LUCY
- Sin Gwang-su (spy) (born 1929), North Korean spy
- Sin Gwang-suk (born 1946), South Korean fencer
- Shin Ha-eun, South Korean television screenwriter
- Shin Ha-kyun (born 1974), South Korean actor
- Shin Ha-young (born 1993), South Korean actress
- Shin Hae-chul (1968–2014), South Korean singer
- Shin Hea-sook (born 1957), South Korean former figure skater
- Shin Hong-gi (born 1968), South Korean former professional footballer
- Shin Hwa-yong (born 1983), South Korean footballer
- Shin Hye-jeong (born 1993), South Korean singer and actress, former member of girl group AOA
- Shin Hye-sun (born 1989), South Korean actress
- Shin Hye-sung (born 1979), South Korean singer-songwriter, member of boy band Shinhwa
- Shin Hyo-seob (stage name Crush, born 1992), South Korean singer-songwriter
- Shin Hyun-been (born 1986), South Korean actress
- Hyun Ji Shin (born 1996), South Korean fashion model
- Shin Hyun-joon (general) (1915–2007), South Korean general
- Shin Hyun-joon (actor) (born 1968), South Korean actor
- Shin Hyun-joon (footballer) (born 1983), South Korean former footballer
- Shin Hyun-soo (born 1989), South Korean actor
- Shin Hyung-min (born 1986), South Korean footballer
- Sin Ik-hui (1894–1956), Korean independence activist and politician
- Shin Il-ryong (1948–2022), South Korean actor and entrepreneur
- Shin Il-soo (born 1994), South Korean footballer
- Shin Il-yong (born 1979), South Korean race walker
- Shin In-seob (born 1989), South Korean footballer
- Shin Jae-chul (1936–2012), South Korean martial artist
- Shin Jae-eun (born 1991), South Korean model
- Shin Jae-ha (born 1993), South Korean actor
- Shin Jae-ho (stage name Microdot, born 1993), South Korean-New Zealand rapper and singer
- Shin Jae-min (born 1958), South Korean bureaucrat
- Shin Jae-min (stage name Sanchez, born 1986), South Korean-New Zealand rapper and singer
- Shin Jae-hwi (born 1994), South Korean actor
- Shin Jae-pil (born 1982), South Korean footballer
- Shin Jae-won (born 1998), South Korean footballer
- Shin Jae-young (born 1989), South Korean former professional baseball player
- Jane Shin (born 1980), Canadian academic and former politician
- Shin Jea-hwan (born 1998), South Korean artistic gymnast, Olympic gold medalist
- Jean Shin (born 1971), American artist
- Jeena Shin (born 1973), New Zealand artist
- Shin Jee-won (born 1996), South Korean actress and singer, former member of girl group Berry Good
- Shin Jeong-ah (born 1972), survivor of the Sampoong Department Store collapse who later lied about her academic credentials
- Sin Jeong-seop (born 1974), South Korean volleyball player
- Shin Jeong-yil (1938–1999), South Korean politician
- Shin Ji-a (born 2008), South Korean figure skater
- Shin Ji-hoon (born 1998), South Korean singer and actress
- Shin Ji-min (born 1991), South Korean former singer and rapper, former member of girl group AOA
- Shin Ji-sang, South Korean manhwa artist
- Shin Ji-soo (born 1994), South Korean singer and actress, former member of girl group D.Heaven
- Shin Ji-yoon (born 2002), South Korean singer, former member of girl group Weeekly
- Sin Jin-ho (born 1988), South Korean professional footballer
- Shin Jin-seo (born 2000), South Korean professional Go player
- Shin Jin-sik (born 1975), South Korean volleyball player
- Shin Jin-won (born 1974), South Korean retired football coach and player
- Jiyai Shin (born 1988), South Korean professional golfer
- Shin Jong-hun (born 1989), South Korean boxer
- Shin Jong-kook (born 1993), South Korean singer, former member of boy band SPEED
- Sin Joon-sik (born 1980), South Korean taekwondo practitioner, Olympic silver medalist
- Shin Joon-sup (born 1963), South Korean middleweight amateur boxer, Olympic gold medalist
- Shin Joong-hyun (born 1938), South Korean rock guitarist, singer-songwriter, known as Korea's "Godfather of Rock"
- Shin Jung-geun (born 1966), South Korean actor
- Shin Jung-hwan (born 1974), South Korean singer and entertainer
- Shin Jung-hwan (footballer), (born 1986), South Korean footballer
- Shin Jung-hwan (stage name Shinyu, born 2003), South Korean singer, member of boy band TWS
- Shin Jung-hyeon (born 1938), South Korean rock guitarist and singer-songwriter
- Sin Jung-ja (born 1980), South Korean basketball player
- Shin Jung-rak (born 1987), South Korean baseball player
- Shin Kang-woo (born 1992), South Korean actor and singer
- Shin Kuhn (1941–2015), South Korean lawyer and politician, former director of the National Intelligence Service
- Shin Kwang-ho (born 1983), South Korean painter and artist
- Shin Kwang-hoon (born 1987), South Korean professional footballer
- Shin Kwang-soo (born 1965), South Korean former sailor
- Shin Kyeong-nim (1936–2024), South Korean writer
- Shin Kyuk-ho (1922–2020), South Korean businessman, founder of Lotte Corporation
- Shin Kyung-hwan (born 1987), South Korean para-badminton player
- Sin Kyung-hyen (born 1977), South Korean taekwondo practitioner
- Shin Kyung-sook (born 1963), South Korean writer
- Kyung Sun Shin (born 1933), Korean-born master of judo
- Michael Shin (born 2004), South Korean racing driver
- Shin Mi-sung (born 1978), South Korean curler
- Shin Min-a (born 1984), South Korean actress and model
- Shin Min-jun (born 1999), South Korean professional Go player
- Sin Myong-ok (born 1965), North Korean gymnast
- Sin Myong-su (born 1966), North Korean gymnast
- Shin Myung-chul (born 1978), South Korean baseball player
- Sin Na-hee (born 1990), South Korean figure skater
- Shin Na-yeong (born 1999), South Korean professional footballer
- Sin Nam-ho (born 1960), North Korean sport shooter
- Nelly Shin (born 1972), Canadian politician, first Korean Canadian to be elected to the House of Commons
- Nelson Shin (born 1939), South Korean animation director, founder and president of AKOM Production, Ltd.
- Nikolai Shin (1928–2006), Uzbekistani painter
- Shin Ok-cheol (stage name Outsider, born 1983), South Korean rapper
- Oleksandr Sin (born 1961), Ukrainian politician, former mayor of Zaporizhia
- Paull Shin (1935–2021), American politician, the first Korean American in the Washington State Legislature
- Peniel Shin (born 1993), American rapper and singer, member of boy band BtoB
- Peter Shin, American animator, director, producer
- Shin Rin-ah (born 2009), South Korean actress
- Shin Rok (born 2002), South Korean weightlifter
- Shin Ryu-jin (born 2001), South Korean rapper and singer, member of girl group ITZY
- Shin Sae-bom (born 1992), South Korean short track speed skater
- Shin Sang-ho (born 1947), South Korean ceramicist
- Shin Sang-hoon (born 1993), South Korean ice hockey player
- Shin Sang-kyu (born 1968), South Korean wrestler
- Shin Sang-ok (1926–2006), South Korean filmmaker
- Sin Sang-sik (born 1941), South Korean wrestler
- Shin Sang-whi (born 2000), South Korean footballer
- Shin Sang-woo (footballer) (born 1976), South Korean football manager and former player
- Shin Sang-woo (ice hockey) (born 1987), South Korean professional ice hockey player
- Shin Se-kyung (born 1990), South Korean actress
- Sin Seok-gyo (born 1971), South Korean field hockey player
- Sin Seok-gyun (born 1966), South Korean field hockey player
- Sin Seon-ho (volleyball) (born 1978), South Korean volleyball player
- Shin Seong-hyun (born 1990), South Korean baseball player
- Shin Seong-ja (born 1968), South Korean fencer
- Shin Seul-ki (born 1998), South Korean actress
- Shin Seung-chan (born 1994), South Korean badminton player, Olympic bronze medalist
- Shin Seung-ho (born 1995), South Korean actor
- Shin Seung-hun (born 1968), South Korean singer
- Shin Seung-hwan (born 1978), South Korean actor
- Shin Shin-ae (born 1959), South Korean actress and trot singer
- Shin Si-ah (born 1998), South Korean actress
- Shin So-jung (born 1990), South Korean retired ice hockey player
- Shin Sol-yi (born 2004), South Korean artistic gymnast
- Sin Son-ho (born 1948), North Korean diplomat and Permanent Representative to the United Nations
- Sin Song-hui (born 1970), North Korean archer
- Shin Soo-hyun (born 1989), South Korean singer, leader of boy band U-KISS
- Shin Soo-ji (born 1991), South Korean former rhythmic gymnast
- Shin Soo-yeon (born 2004), South Korean actress and model
- Shin Soon-ho (born 1959), South Korean former tennis player
- Shin Su-hyun (born 1996), South Korean actress
- Shin Su-jin (stage name Since, born 1992), South Korean rapper
- Shin Su-ran (born 1986), South Korean singer
- Sin Su-yeong (born 1971), South Korean boxer
- Shin Suk-ja (born 1942), South Korean political prisoner held in the North Korean political prison camp
- Shin Sun-nam (footballer) (born 1981), South Korean footballer
- Sun Yung Shin (born 1974), American poet, writer, consultant, educator
- Shin Sung-rok (born 1982), South Korean actor
- Shin Sung-woo (born 1968), South Korean singer and actor
- Shin Tae-yong (born 1970), South Korean football manager and former professional player
- Sin Ui-gun (born 1958), North Korean football manager
- Shin Won-ho (director) (born 1975), South Korean director and television producer
- Shin Won-ho (born 1991), South Korean singer and actor, member of boy band Cross Gene
- Shin Won-ho (footballer) (born 2001), South Korean professional footballer
- Shin Won-sik (born 1958), South Korean politician
- Shin Woo-chul, South Korean television director
- Shin Yea-ji (figure skater, born 1984), South Korean former figure skater
- Shin Yea-ji (figure skater, born 1988), South Korean former figure skater and choreographer
- Shin Yechan (born 1992), South Korean musician, leader of band LUCY
- Shin Ye-chan (born 2001), South Korean singer and actor, member of boy band OMEGA X
- Shin Ye-eun (born 1998), South Korean actress
- Sin Ye-young (born 1991), South Korean singer
- Shin Yeon-shick (born 1976), South Korean film director and screenwriter
- Shin Yeon-suh (born 1993), South Korean actress and singer, former leader of girl group Gugudan
- Shin Yeong-eun (born 1987), South Korean rower
- Shin Yon-ho (born 1964), South Korean football manager and former player
- Shin Yong-mok (born 1974), South Korean poet
- Sin Yong-nam (born 1978), North Korean football coach and former player
- Shin Young-chul (born 1964), South Korean former volleyball player
- Shin Young-jun (born 1989), South Korean footballer
- Shin Young-kyun (born 1928), South Korean actor, film producer, politician
- Shin Youngok (born 1961), South Korean classical soprano singer
- Shin Young-rok (born 1987), South Korean footballer
- Shin Young-soo (born 1982), South Korean volleyball player
- Shin Youngsook (born 1975), South Korean musical theatre actress
- Shin Young-sun (born 1969), South Korean biathlete
- Shin Yu-bin (born 2004), South Korean table tennis player, Olympic bronze medalist
- Shin Yu-na (born 2003), South Korean rapper and singer, member of girl group ITZY
- Shin Yung-kyoo (1942–1996), North Korean footballer
- Shin Yung-suk (born 1986), South Korean volleyball player

=== Fictional ===
- Stephen Shin, a character of DC Comic series Aquaman
- Shin Kyung-soo, one of the two female leads of 2003 South Korean drama Rosemary
- Shin Ji-hyun, main character of 2011 South Korean drama 49 Days
- Shin Suk-ki, the main protagonist of 2004 South Korean movie Shinsukki Blues
- Shin Ji-hoon, one of main characters of 2012 South Korean television series I Need Romance 2012
- Shin Joo-yeon, female lead of 2014 South Korean series I Need Romance 3
- Shin Ji-min, real name of Song Yi-kyung, a main character from 2011 South Korean drama 49 Days
- Shin Chae-kyung, female lead of 2017 South Korean drama Queen for Seven Days
- Shin Se-gi, split personality of Cha Do-hyun, a DID patient and main character of 2015 South Korean television series Kill Me, Heal Me
- Shin Ha-kyung, female lead of 2014 South Korean series Punch
- Shin Suk-ho, main lead of 2016 South Korean series Entertainer
- Shin Woo Yeo, main lead of 2021 South Korean series My Roommate Is a Gumiho
- Shin Young-joo, female lead of 2017 South Korean drama Whisper
- Shin Sang, male character of 2021 South Korean series Mouse
- Shin Ah-ri, one of the female leads of 2021 South Korean series No Matter What
- Shin Ha-ri, female lead of 2022 South Korean series Business Proposal

== See also ==
- Korean name
- Korean language
- List of Korean family names
