= Yi Chongjang =

Korean military officer (1544–1592)

- Hangul: 이종장
- Hanja: 李宗張
- RR: I Jongjang
- MR: I Chongjang

Courtesy name
- Hangul: 문경
- Hanja: 文卿
- RR: Mungyeong
- MR: Mun'gyŏng

Posthumous name
- Hangul: 무강
- Hanja: 武剛
- RR: Mugang
- MR: Mugang

Yi Chongjang (Korean: 이종장; Hanja: 李宗張; 1544–1592) was a Korean magistrate and military official who fought at the Battle of Chungju during the first of the Japanese Invasions of Korea in 1592.

== Biography ==
Yi Chongjang was born in 1544. His family, the Hongju Lee clan, has its ancestral seat in present-day Hongseong, South Chungcheong Province. His father was Yi Han (이한; 李漢). From early childhood, Yi Chongjang was known for his filial piety. After passing the military service examination (무과; 武科) in 1569 (Seonjo Year 2), he was recommended by Chief State Councillor Yi Sanhae (이산해; 李山海) for higher military service in 1589. In 1591, he was charged by the Office of the Censors (사간원) to Sinchon County (신천군; 信川郡).

The following year, at the onset of the invasion, he was appointed the Chungju District Magistrate and Auxiliary Defense Commander (충주목사 겸 조방장; 忠州牧使兼助防將) in Chungcheong Province. There, he aided General Sin Rip, General Yi Il, and others in the effort to stop the advance of Konishi Yukinaga’s First Division to Seoul.

During Konishi's rapid movement from Sangju toward Chungju, General Sin made the decision to fight a battle on the plains before Chungju Castle rather than at the Joryeong Pass. The Korean forces were arrayed on and around a hill known as Tangeumdae at the confluence of the Dalcheon and Han Rivers. On June 5 (1592.4.27 Lunar) Magistrate Yi and General Yi sent scouts to reconnoiter the Japanese forces blocking the road at the Danwol Post Station. On June 6 (1592.4.28 Lunar), Konishi's First Division assaulted the Korean positions. In the ensuing battle, Yi Chongjang died along with his son, Yi Hŭirip (이희립; 李希立). Yi Chongjang was posthumously named Mugang (무강; 武剛).

== Popular culture ==
Portrayed by Song Hoseop in the 2004–2005 television series Immortal Admiral Yi Sun-sin.
