= Battle of Sangju (1592) =

Battle of the 1592 Japanese invasion of Korea

- Part of the Imjin War
Date	June 3, 1592 (Gregorian Calendar); April 25, 1592 (Lunar calendar)
Location	Sangju, North Gyeongsang, Korea
Result	Japanese victory

Belligerents
Toyotomi-ruled Japan	Kingdom of Joseon

Commanders and leaders
Konishi Yukinaga	Yi Il

Strength
16,700	900

Casualties and losses
100 casualties	Most killed and army entirely annihilated

The Battle of Sangju was a battle during the Japanese invasions of Korea (1592–98). After capturing Busan and Dongnae, the Japanese army under Konishi Yukinaga advanced at a rapid rate of almost 20 kilometres (12 mi) per day towards the Joseon capital of Hanseong (present-day Seoul) .

== Background ==
Joseon General Yi Il arrived at Sangju on 2 June with only a force of 60 cavalrymen. On receiving his formal assignment to block the Japanese advance from Busan towards Hanseomg while he was still in Gyeongsang Province, he found that his company of 300 supposedly first-rate troops consisted largely of untrained students and clerks conscripted out of government offices to replace men whose names were on the military lists, but who were either missing, already deceased, or claiming exemption due to illness. Rather than attempting to march this untrained force into battle, he took only his veterans, and hoped to recruit forces from the local garrison. On arriving in Sangju, he found that the garrison was completely depleted, as all of the soldiers had been called away to defend the provincial capital of Daegu to the south. With no soldiers, Yi decided to use grain from the government warehouses to recruit local peasants, and managed to gather a force of 900 men. These men were untrained and were little more than a mob, and Yi thought that he might have perhaps a week to train them. however, the Japanese army under Konishi Yukinaga arrived the following day.

== Battle ==
When one of Yi's peasant conscripts brought word that the Japanese advance contingent had been spotted, Yi refused to believe it and had the man beheaded for spreading rumors. He felt that it was impossible that the Japanese could have advanced from Busan to Sangju in only ten days. However, the report was soon verified, and Yi deployed his force on a hill behind Sangju.

Konishi divided his army into two groups. The first, led by Konishi and Matsura Shigenobu took the town of Sangju without a fight. The second, consisting of 6700 men led by Sō Yoshitoshi, Ōmura Yoshiaki, and Gotō Mototsugu, headed directly to confront Yi. They approached through a forest, observed but out of range of Yi's archers. The archers failed to send warning to Yi, fearing the same fate as the man who had just been beheaded, and Yi was unaware of the Japanese approach until the vanguard emerged from the forest and shot down a scout less than a 100 metres (330 ft) from his position. The Japanese army then fanned out in three groups and rushed the Koreans. At 50 metres (160 ft) Yi's untrained forces broke and were cut down.

== Aftermath ==
Yi managed to escape north, discarding his armor and his horse in the process. He continued through the strategic Choryong Pass, which could have been held to good effect against the Japanese, and joined his superior, General Sin Rip at Chungju.

The Japanese army continued its advance towards Chungju.

== See also ==
- Battle of Ch'ungju

== Bibliography ==
- Alagappa, Muthiah (2003), Asian Security Order: Instrumental and Normative Features, Stanford University Press, ISBN 978-0-8047-4629-8
- Arano, Yasunori (2005), The Formation of a Japanocentric World Order, International Journal of Asian Studies
- Brown, Delmer M. (May 1948), "The Impact of Firearms on Japanese Warfare, 1543–1598", The Far Eastern Quarterly, 7 (3): 236–53, doi:10.2307/2048846, JSTOR 2048846, S2CID 162924328
- Eikenberry, Karl W. (1988), "The Imjin War", Military Review, 68 (2): 74–82
- Ha, Tae-hung; Sohn, Pow-key (1977), 'Nanjung Ilgi: War Diary of Admiral Yi Sun-sin, Yonsei University Press, ISBN 978-89-7141-018-9
- Haboush, JaHyun Kim (2016), The Great East Asian War and the Birth of the Korean Nation
- Hawley, Samuel (2005), The Imjin War, The Royal Asiatic Society, Korea Branch/UC Berkeley Press, ISBN 978-89-954424-2-5
- Jang, Pyun-soon (1998), Noon-eu-ro Bo-nen Han-gook-yauk-sa 5: Gor-yeo Si-dae (눈으로 보는 한국역사 5: 고려시대), Park Doo-ui, Bae Keum-ram, Yi Sang-mi, Kim Ho-hyun, Kim Pyung-sook, et al., Joog-ang Gyo-yook-yaun-goo-won. 1998-10-30. Seoul, Korea.
- Kim, Ki-chung (Fall 1999), "Resistance, Abduction, and Survival: The Documentary Literature of the Imjin War (1592–8)", Korean Culture, 20 (3): 20–29
- Kim, Yung-sik (1998), "Problems and Possibilities in the Study of the History of Korean Science", Osiris, 2nd Series, 13: 48–79, doi:10.1086/649280, JSTOR 301878, S2CID 143724260
- 桑田忠親 [Kuwata, Tadachika], ed., 舊參謀本部編纂, [Kyu Sanbo Honbu], 朝鮮の役 [Chousen no Eki] (日本の戰史 [Nihon no Senshi] Vol. 5), 1965.
- Neves, Jaime Ramalhete (1994), "The Portuguese in the Im-Jim War?", Review of Culture, 18: 20–24
- Niderost, Eric (June 2001), "Turtleboat Destiny: The Imjin War and Yi Sun Shin", Military Heritage, 2 (6): 50–59, 89
- Niderost, Eric (January 2002), "The Miracle at Myongnyang, 1597", Osprey Military Journal, 4 (1): 44–50
- Park, Yune-hee (1973), Admiral Yi Sun-shin and His Turtleboat Armada: A Comprehensive Account of the Resistance of Korea to the 16th Century Japanese Invasion, Shinsaeng Press
- Rockstein, Edward D. (1993), Strategic And Operational Aspects of Japan's Invasions of Korea 1592–1598 1993-6-18, Naval War College
- Sadler, A. L. (June 1937), "The Naval Campaign in the Korean War of Hideyoshi (1592–1598)", Transactions of the Asiatic Society of Japan, Second Series, 14: 179–208
- Sansom, George (1961), A History of Japan 1334–1615, Stanford University Press, ISBN 978-0-8047-0525-7
- Sohn, Pow-key (April–June 1959), "Early Korean Painting", Journal of the American Oriental Society, 79 (2): 96–103, doi:10.2307/595851, JSTOR 595851
- Stramigioli, Giuliana (December 1954), "Hideyoshi's Expansionist Policy on the Asiatic Mainland", Transactions of the Asiatic Society of Japan, Third Series, 3: 74–116
- Strauss, Barry (Summer 2005), "Korea's Legendary Admiral", MHQ: The Quarterly Journal of Military History, 17 (4): 52–61
- Swope, Kenneth M. (2006), "Beyond Turtleboats: Siege Accounts from Hideyoshi's Second Invasion of Korea, 1597–1598", Sungkyun Journal of East Asian Studies, 6 (2): 177–206
- Swope, Kenneth M. (2005), "Crouching Tigers, Secret Weapons: Military Technology Employed During the Sino-Japanese-Korean War, 1592–1598", The Journal of Military History, 69: 11–42, doi:10.1353/jmh.2005.0059, S2CID 159829515
- Swope, Kenneth M. (December 2002), "Deceit, Disguise, and Dependence: China, Japan, and the Future of the Tributary System, 1592–1596", The International History Review, 24 (4): 757–1008, doi:10.1080/07075332.2002.9640980, S2CID 154827808
- Swope, Kenneth M. (2009), A Dragon's Head and a Serpent's Tail: Ming China and the First Great East Asian War, 1592–1598, University of Oklahoma Press
- Turnbull, Stephen (2002), Samurai Invasion: Japan's Korean War 1592–98, Cassell & Co, ISBN 978-0-304-35948-6
- Turnbull, Stephen (2008), The Samurai Invasion of Korea 1592-98, Osprey Publishing Ltd
- Turnbull, Stephen (1998), The Samurai Sourcebook, Cassell & Co, ISBN 978-1-85409-523-7
- Villiers, John (1980), SILK and Silver: Macau, Manila and Trade in the China Seas in the Sixteenth Century (A lecture delivered to the Hong Kong Branch of the Royal Asiatic Society at the Hong Kong Club. 10 June 1980).
- Yi, Min-woong (2004), Imjin Wae-ran Haejeonsa: The Naval Battles of the Imjin War [임진왜란 해전사], Chongoram Media [청어람미디어], ISBN 978-89-89722-49-6
