= Sin Sunggyŏm =

Korean general (fl. 10th century)

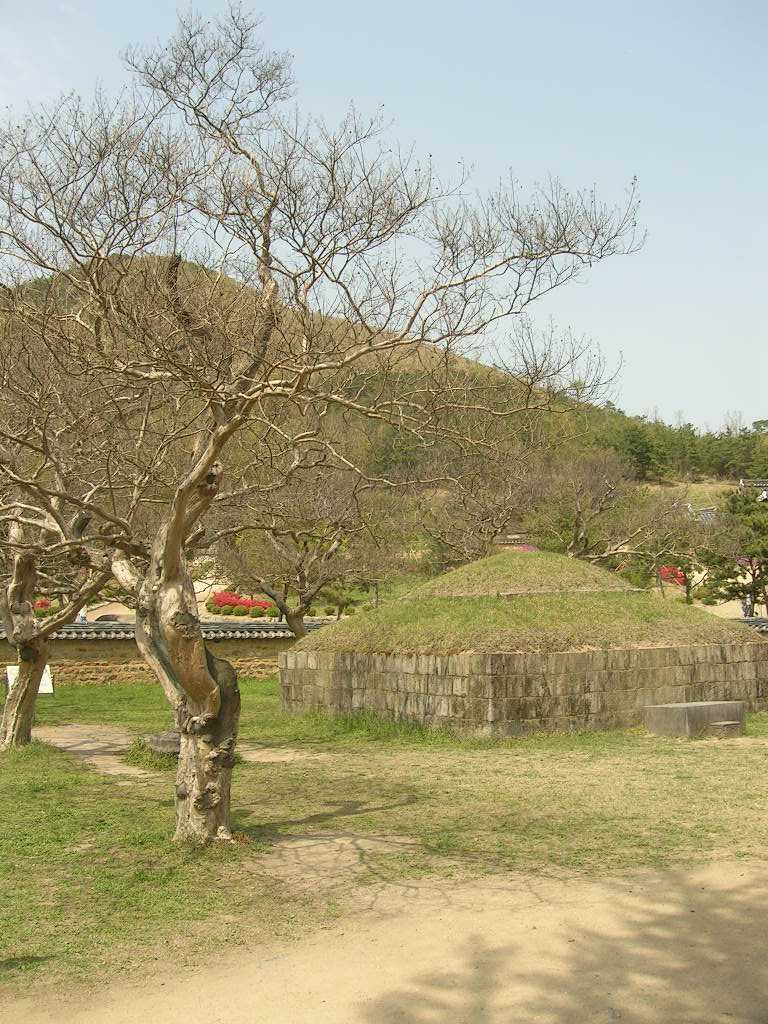
- Shrine of the general Sin Sunggyŏm in northern Daegu, South Korea.

Korean name
- Hangul: 신숭겸
- Hanja: 申崇謙
- RR: Sin Sunggyeom
- MR: Sin Sunggyŏm

Posthumous name
- Hangul: 장절
- Hanja: 壯節
- RR: Jangjeol
- MR: Changjŏl

Other names
- Hangul: 능산, 삼능산
- Hanja: 能山, 三能山
- RR: Neungsan, Samneungsan
- MR: Nŭngsan, Samnŭngsan

Sin Sunggyŏm (Korean: 신숭겸; Hanja: 申崇謙; 882 – October 927) was a Korean general during the turbulent Later Three Kingdoms period in the early 10th century. Born in Gwanghaeju (present-day Chuncheon), he became a general in the kingdom of T'aebong. He was instrumental in helping Wang Kŏn, who later founded the state of Goryeo to achieve power. He is widely viewed as the founder of the Pyongsan Shin clan, which includes the famous actress Shin Se-kyung.

Sin is remembered today for giving his life for Wang Kŏn in the aftermath of a rout of their forces by Later Baekje near present-day Daegu. According to the legend, the two exchanged armor so that the king would be able to escape the battlefield. While Wang Kŏn escaped the battlefield, Sin and the remaining army fought bravely against the Later Baekje army. But eventually, his army was routed and in the woods Sin was shot with arrows and was killed by the enemy. He was beheaded and his head was sent to Kyŏn Hwŏn, King of Later Baekje.

Through his only son, Sin became the 16th great-grandfather of Shin Saimdang and the 17th great-grandfather of Sin Rip.

== Family ==
- Father - name unknown (845 – ?)
- Mother - name unknown (845 – ?)
- Sibling(s)
  - Older brother - Sin Nŭngil (신능길; 申能吉; 872 – ?)
- Wives and their issue
  - Lady Kim (김씨; 金氏; 869 – ?)
    - Daughter - Lady Sin of the Pyongsan Sin clan (평산 신씨; 平山 申氏; 896 – ?)
    - Daughter - Lady Sin of the Pyongsan Sin clan (평산 신씨; 平山 申氏; 900 – ?)
    - Son - Sin Pojang (신보장; 申甫藏; 903 – ?)
    - Daughter - Lady Sin of the Pyongsan Sin clan (평산 신씨; 平山 申氏; 913 – ?)
  - Lady Yu of the Munhwa Yu clan (문화 유씨; 文化 柳氏; 912 – ?) - No issue.

== Cultural references ==
- First Love (1996–1997) (Note: In Episode 26, there is a scene where Choi Soo-jong and Lee Seung-yeon look around the tomb of Sin Sunggyŏm in Chuncheon, after that, 4 years after the end of first love, Choi Soo-jong playing the role of Taejo in Taejo Wang Geon, and the scene appears that he weeps loudly when he sees Sin Sunggyŏm serving as bait and going to die.)
- Taejo Wang Geon (2000–2002), portrayed by Kim Hyung-il
- Thousand Days Unofficial History - Episode 73 (ko) (2018)
- Taejo Wang Geon (2022)

== See also ==
- List of Goryeo people
- History of Korea
- Military history of Korea
