= Ojukheon =

Treasure of South Korea

Coordinates: 37°46′42.814″N 128°52′39.995″E

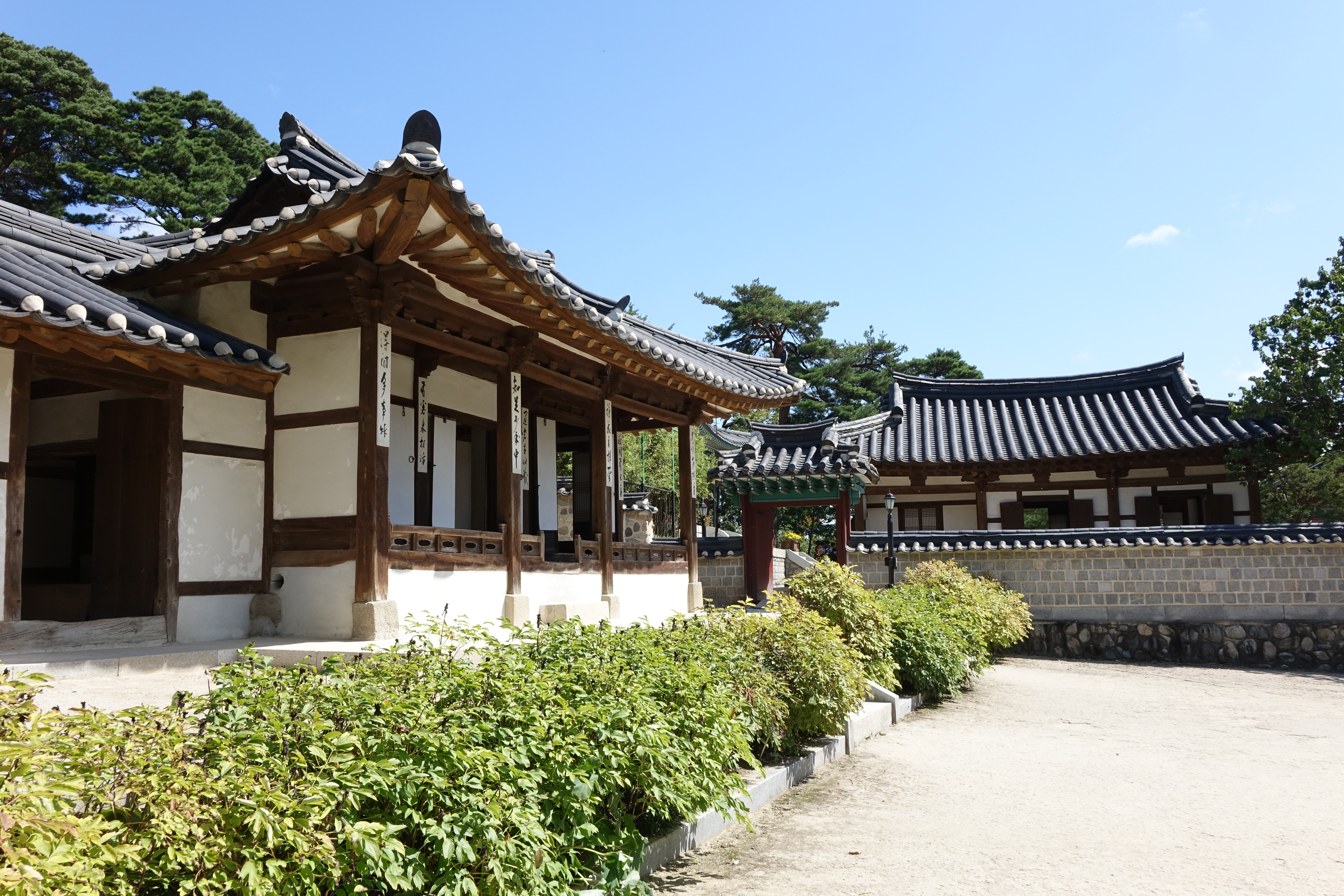
- Ojukheon in 2015
- Interactive map of Ojukheon
- Location: Gangneung, Gangwon Province, South Korea

Treasures of South Korea
- Official name: Ojukheon House, Gangneung
- Designated: 1963-01-21

Korean name
- Hangul: 오죽헌
- Hanja: 烏竹軒
- RR: Ojukheon
- MR: Ojukhŏn

Ojukheon (Korean: 오죽헌; Hanja: 烏竹軒) is a house in Gangneung, Gangwon Province, South Korea where Shin Saimdang and her son Yi I were born. It was designated as Treasure in 1963 because it is one of the oldest buildings in Korea.

Its name comes from black bamboo (ojuk) surrounding the house (heon). It appears as the background of the South Korean 5000 won note.

== History ==
Ojukheon was built in the late 15th century by Choi Eung-hyeon (최응현, 1428~1507). Choi passed on the house to his second son-in-law, Yi Sa-on (이사온) who then passed it on to his son-in-law, Shin Myeong-hwa (신명화), Shin Saimdang's father. The building represents houses of scholar-officials in middle Joseon and shows the change in architecture from jusimpo to ikgong.

Designated a national cultural property and protected under the Joseon Cultural Heritage Protection Ordinance in 1938, the building was dismantled in 1975 as part of the Ojukheon Restoration Project with the construction of Munseongsa Shrine and a memorial hall. In 1995, the old house behind Ojukheon was restored.

== Buildings ==
The following buildings form the Ojukheon complex.

- Ojukheon: The room where Yi was born is called Mongnyongsil (몽룡실; 夢龍室) because Shin dreamed of a dragon the day before his birth.
- Munseongsa (문성사; 文成祠) is a shrine built in 1975 to honor the portrait of Yi. Munseong is a posthumous name King Injo gave to Yi.
- Eojegak (어제각; 御製閣) was built to store Gyeongmongyogyeol, an introductory book to Confucianism, and inkstone used by Yi.

== Natural monument ==
- Yulgongmae (율곡매; 栗谷梅) was planted in the 15th century. Shin is thought to have drawn paintings of this plum tree.

== Museums ==
- Yulgok Memorial Hall: Established in 1965, it displays works by Shin, Yi, Yi U, Yi Maechang and Hwang Giro.
- Gangneung City Museum: Established in 1992, it exhibits relics that show the history and culture of Gangneung.
- Gangneung Money Museum: Established in 2023, real money from the Goryeo Dynasty to the establishment of the Bank of Korea are displayed.

== Gallery ==
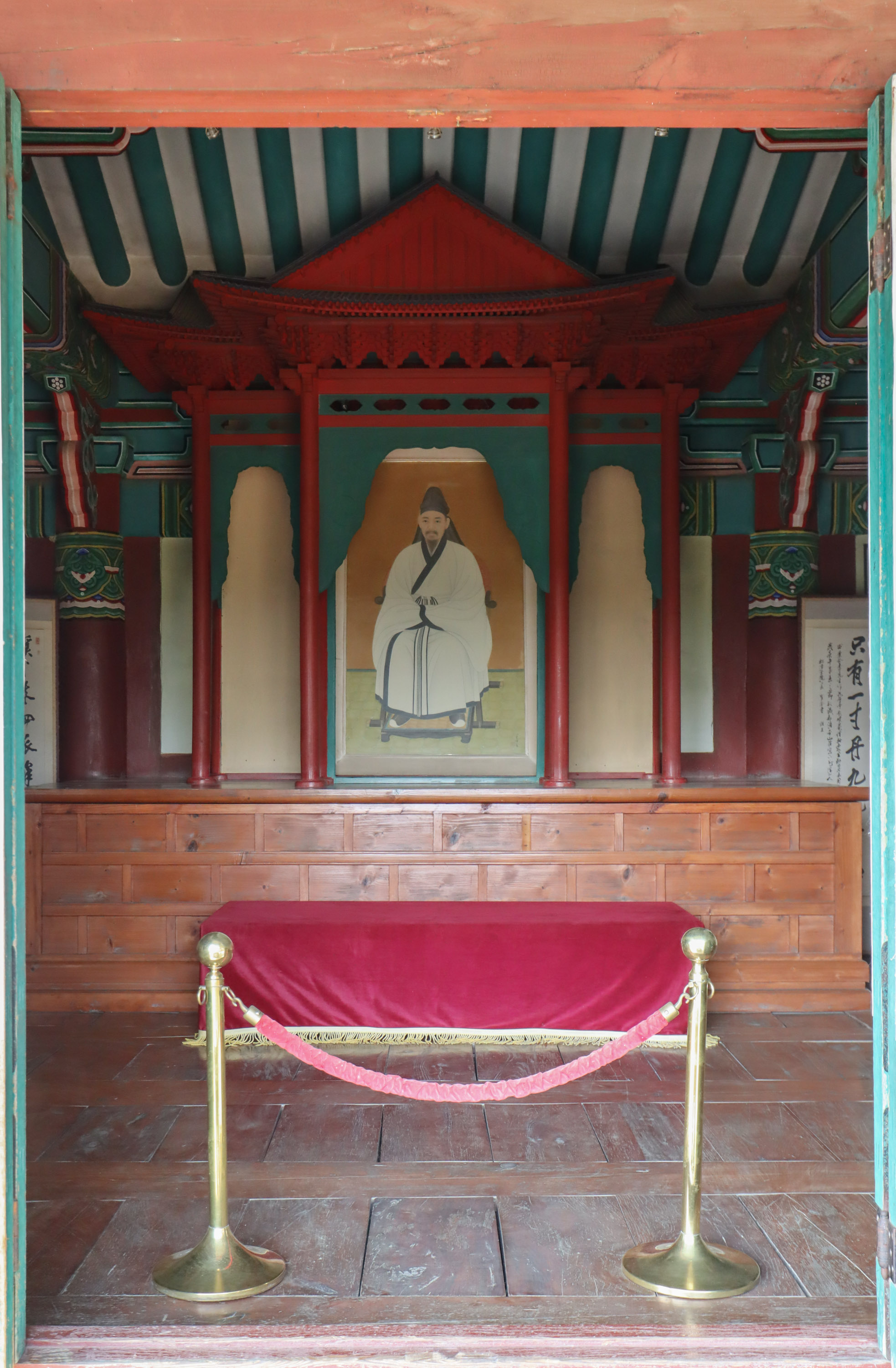
Munseongsa

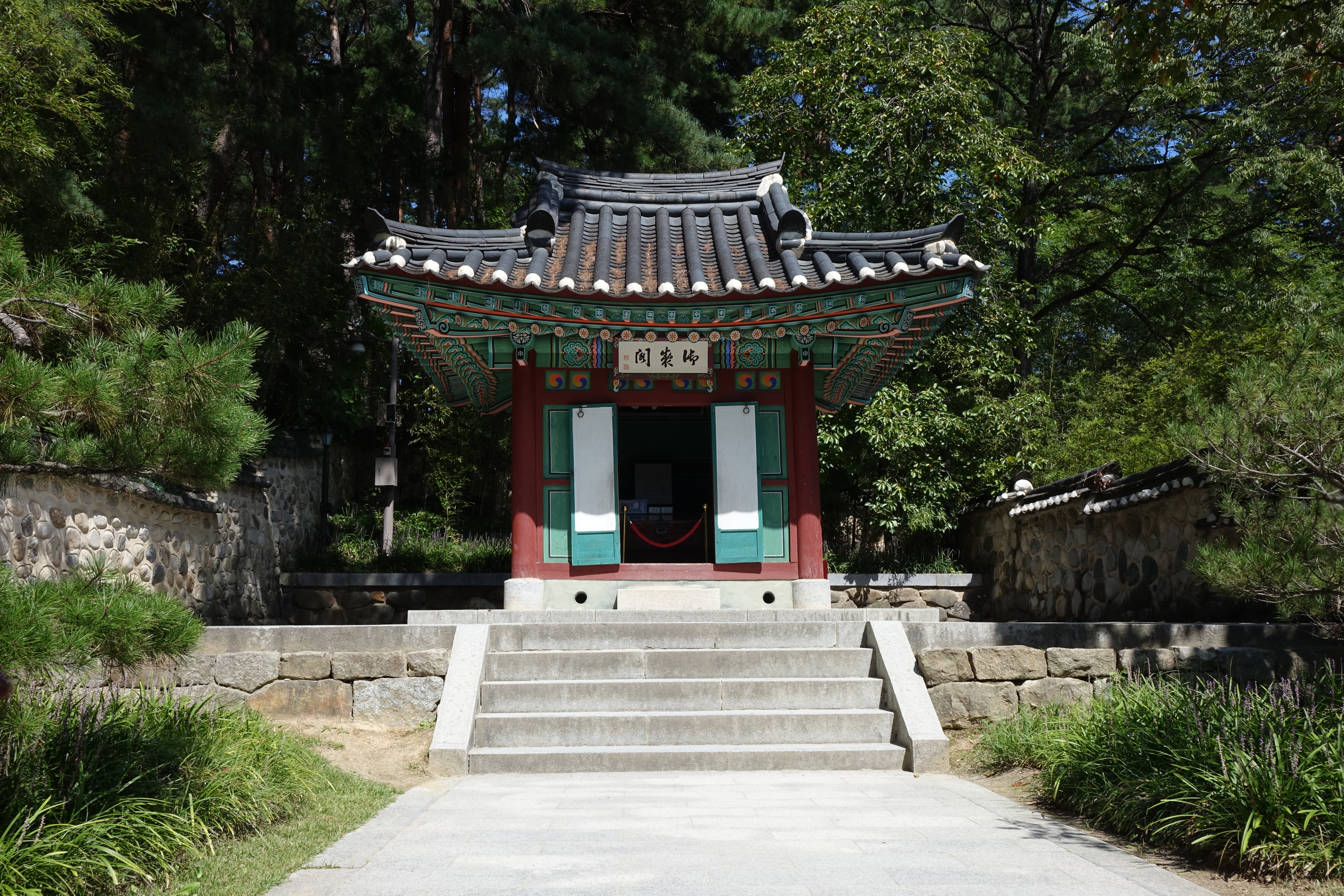
Eojegak

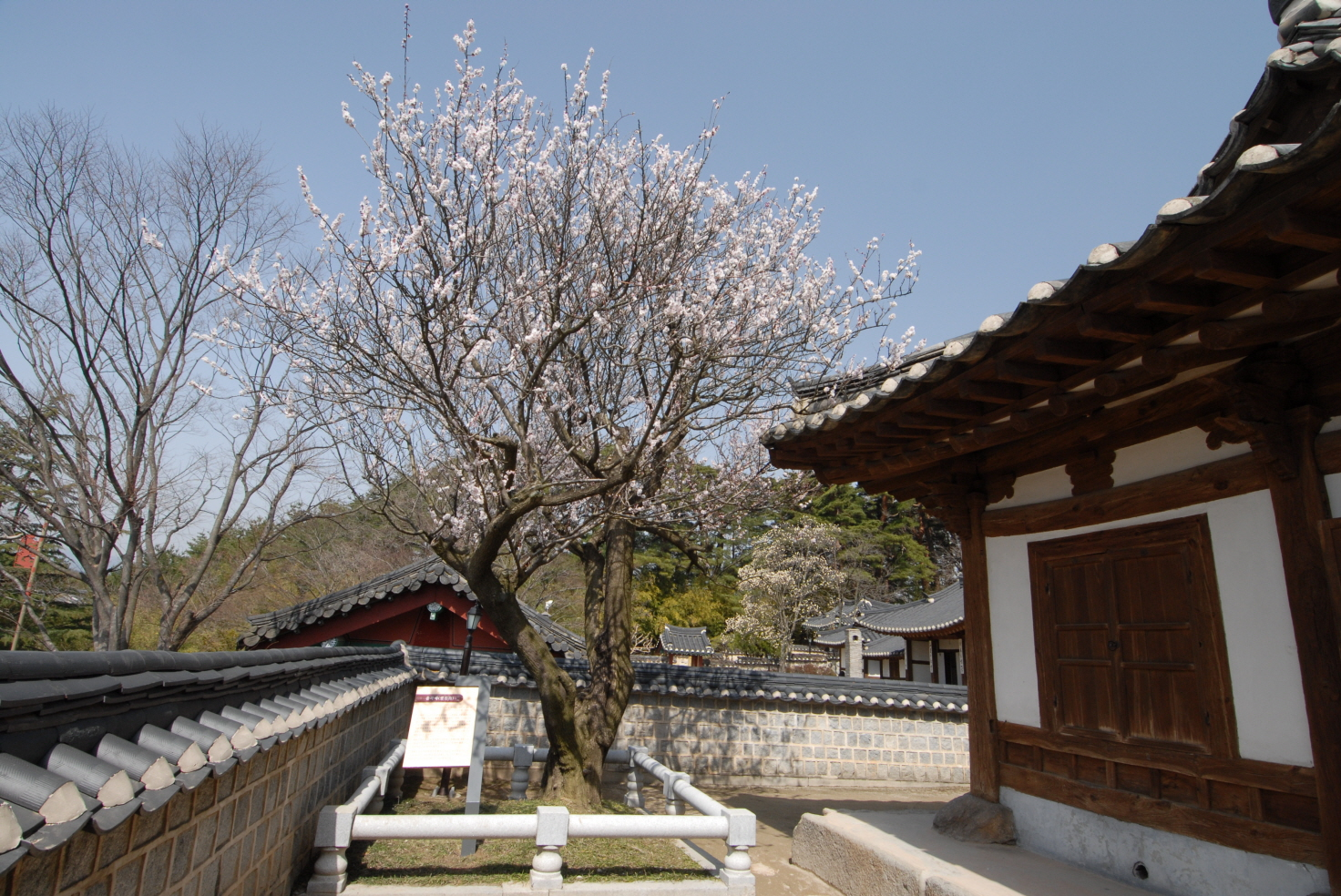
Yulgongmae

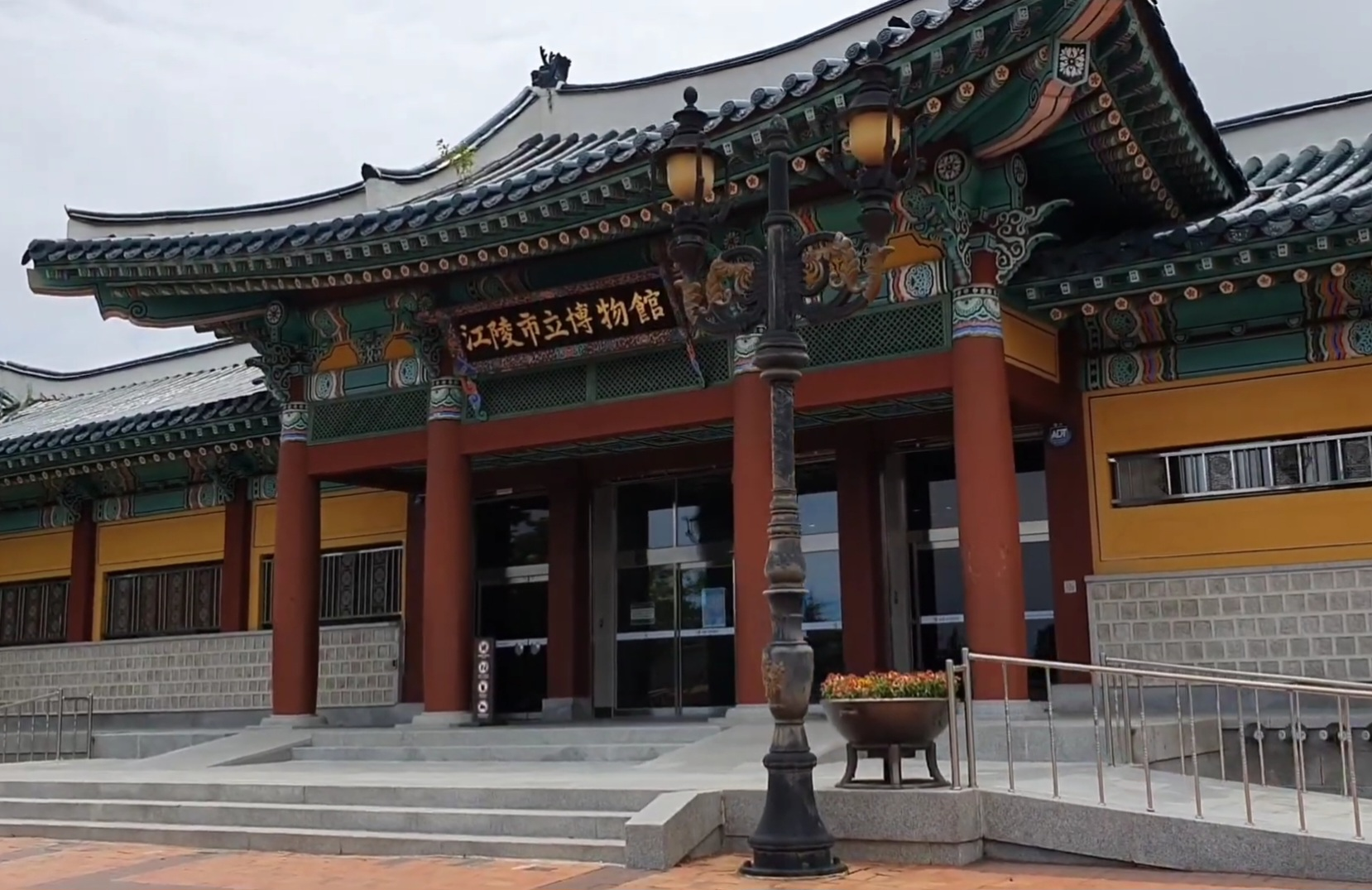
Gangneung City Museum
