= Battle of Chungju =

1592 Japanese victory over Joseon Korea

Battle of Chungju (Choryang Pass)
- Part of Imjin War
Date	June 7, 1592 (Gregorian calendar); April 28, 1592 (Lunar calendar)
Location	Tangeumdae Hill, near Chungju 36°58′N 127°57′E
Result	Japanese victory

Belligerents
Toyotomi Japan	Kingdom of Joseon

Commanders and leaders
Konishi Yukinaga; So Yoshitoshi; Matsuura Shigenobu; Arima Harunobu; Omura Yoshiaki	Sin Rip †; Byeon Gi †; Kim Yeo-mul †; Yi Il; Yi Jong-jang †

Strength
18,700	8,000–16,000

Casualties and losses
About 150 casualties	Annihilation; Most drowned 8,000 Korean troops killed Yi Il fled Hundreds of captives
- Location within South Korea Battle of Chungju (Korea)

The Battle of Chungju or the Battle of Tangeumdae was the last battle of the Chungju Campaign fought between the Koreans and Japanese during the Japanese invasion of Korea in 1592. Chungju is located just south of the Han River and Seoul, Korea's capital. The defeat of the Korean forces at Chungju led directly to the capture of the capital of Hanseong by Japanese forces shortly thereafter.

== Background ==
On receiving word of the Japanese invasion, and the fall of Busan and Dongnae to the Japanese, the Joseon court under King Seonjo took belated steps to appoint generals and to strengthen defenses on the approaches to the capital at Hanseong (present-day Seoul). Knowing that geography would dictate that the Japanese would follow one of three possible routes through the mountains to reach Hanseong, the central (and most direct) route was given the highest priority and its defense was assigned to Yi II and Sin Rip. Both generals had distinguished careers fighting the Jurchen to the north, but were hampered by lack of manpower, as the official military lists of soldiers were filled with missing men or untrained conscripts. Sin Rip was authorized to recruit the Naegeumwi Royal Guards into his forces and was personally given a sword by the king.

Sin Rip assembled his forces at Chungju, consisting of approximately 8000 men. Many of these soldiers had fled from previous engagement with the Japanese at Dongnae, Daegu, and other locations to the south. His original plan was to fortify Choryong Pass, where the terrain could be used to good advantage against the numerically superior Japanese. However, the sudden appearance of General Yi II, minus his armor, horse, and army fresh from defeat at the Battle of Sangju cancelled these plans, as the Japanese army under Konishi Yukinaga was already approaching the pass. Sin Rip then decided to meet the Japanese out on the flat plains near Chungju with his back to the Han River. On one hand, the flat plains would give an advantage to his cavalry, but on the other hand, the Han River made retreat impossible.

In the meantime, a second Japanese army of approximately 20,000 men under the command of Kato Kiyomasa had caught up with Konishi's army at Mungyong, just north of Sangju, where the eastern and central routes to Hanseong merged. Kato was outraged that his rival, Konishi, had disobeyed orders to wait for his arrival at Busan, and had instead advanced far ahead. Kato demanded that his forces now be allowed to take the lead and to capture Hanseong, but Konishi refused. The two armies crossed the Choryong Pass together and approached Chungju, where Kato suddenly announced that he would set up camp, hoping that Konishi would rush headlong into battle with Sin Rip's cavalry, making him look foolish and incompetent.

== Battle ==
As with previous battles at Busan and Dongnae, Konishi split his army into two. Sō Yoshitoshi and Konishi took the left flank and center with 15,000 men and the other commanders (Arima Harunobu, Ōmura Yoshiaki, and Gotō Mototsugu) with 3700 men took the right, fanning out into a large arc. Sin Rip lined up his cavalry division along the river. This classic Chinese strategy is known as bae-soo-jin (배수진, 背水陣 in Korean). However, as with previous engagements, the superior range and firepower of the arquebus-armed ashigaru soldiers inflicted heavy casualties on the crowded Korean forces while remaining out of range of the defender's bows and spears. Sin Rip did manage one cavalry charge, but found that various vegetation on the plain impeded his horses and that the Japanese forces also employed a considerable number of pikemen, who were able to break his charge before he could penetrate the Japanese lines.

Sin Rip and a number of his commanders mounted on horses managed to escape the disaster; however, most of his men were cut down by the Japanese as they attempted to retreat. According to Japanese records, the Koreans lost 3000 men and several hundred were taken prisoner. As was customary, the heads of the slain were taken as trophies of war, but in this battle the number was too great, and it became the practice to take only the noses as "proof", needed when the soldiers applied for rewards. The Japanese took Chungju with minimal losses. Sin Rip later killed himself to atone for the defeat by drowning himself in a spring a short distance from Chungju.

== Aftermath ==
After the battle, the forces of Kato Kiyomasa and Nabeshima Naoshige rejoined Konishi's army. Kato was even further upset over Konishi's success, and almost came to blows over who would lead the final attack on Hanseong. Konishi told Kato that there were two routes to the capital. The direct route to the northwest was the shortest, but crossed the Han River where the river was the widest. The other route was longer, to the north and then west, but crossed the Han River near its headwaters, where it was much narrower. He offered to draw lots over which route to take, but Kato demanded that he be given the direct route. Both generals set off the same night, not wishing for his rival to gain an advantage.

A messenger brought the news of the defeat at Chungju to King Seonjo on 7 June, causing widespread panic. Many fled the city with whatever possessions they could carry, including most of the guards. Although many officials urged King Seonjo to remain in the capital, Prime Minister Yi Sanhae overcame opposition by citing precedents for the king relocating in time of crisis. King Seonjo appointed General Kim Myŏngwŏn as Commander-in-Chief and Field Marshal, and ordered him to defend the capital. Then the king moved to Pyongyang, since the Japanese began to seize the capital. He later moved even further north to the border city of Uiju just before the fall of Pyongyang. While the king was absent from the capital, many people who had lost hope in the government plundered the palace and burned many public buildings. This resulted in even more damage than that perpetrated by the Japanese after they had captured the city.

On 8 June, the vanguard of Kato's army reached the Han River, finding that all boats on the south bank had been destroyed, either by the Koreans, or by Konishi's men sent ahead to impede his progress. On the north bank of the river, Kim Myŏngwŏn deployed his 50 officers and 1000 men to oppose Kato's crossing. Undeterred by the lack of boats, Kato ordered his men to cut down trees and make rafts, effecting a crossing of the Han River near what is now the Yongsan District of Seoul on 11 June. Seeing that he was greatly outnumbered, and unnerved by the arquebus fire from the Japanese troops, Kim fled his command disguised as a civilian, allowing Kato's army to cross unopposed. He reached the South Gate of the city on 12 June, only to find that Konishi's banner was already flying from its roof. Konishi's forces had raced ahead of Kato, and had entered the city through its East Gate hours earlier. Four days later, on 16 June, the army of Kuroda Nagamasa reached the city, together with the army of 10,000 men led by Ukita Hideie of Bizen Province. The remaining five armies of Toyotomi Hideyoshi's invasion force of 158,000 men had already arrived in the vicinity of Busan.

== See also ==
- List of battles during the Japanese invasions of Korea (1592–1598)
- Timeline of the Japanese invasions of Korea

== Bibliography ==
- Alagappa, Muthiah (2003), Asian Security Order: Instrumental and Normative Features, Stanford University Press, ISBN 978-0-8047-4629-8
- Arano, Yasunori (2005), The Formation of a Japanocentric World Order, International Journal of Asian Studies
- Brown, Delmer M. (May 1948), "The Impact of Firearms on Japanese Warfare, 1543–1598", The Far Eastern Quarterly, 7 (3): 236–53, doi:10.2307/2048846, JSTOR 2048846, S2CID 162924328
- Eikenberry, Karl W. (1988), "The Imjin War", Military Review, 68 (2): 74–82
- Haboush, JaHyun Kim (2016), The Great East Asian War and the Birth of the Korean Nation
- Hawley, Samuel (2005), The Imjin War, The Royal Asiatic Society, Korea Branch/UC Berkeley Press, ISBN 978-89-954424-2-5
- Kim, Ki-chung (Fall 1999), "Resistance, Abduction, and Survival: The Documentary Literature of the Imjin War (1592–8)", Korean Culture, 20 (3): 20–29
- Rockstein, Edward D. (1993), Strategic And Operational Aspects of Japan's Invasions of Korea 1592–1598 1993-6-18, Naval War College
- Sansom, George (1961), A History of Japan 1334–1615, Stanford University Press, ISBN 978-0-8047-0525-7
- Stramigioli, Giuliana (December 1954), "Hideyoshi's Expansionist Policy on the Asiatic Mainland", Transactions of the Asiatic Society of Japan, Third Series, 3: 74–116
- Swope, Kenneth M. (2005), "Crouching Tigers, Secret Weapons: Military Technology Employed During the Sino-Japanese-Korean War, 1592–1598", The Journal of Military History, 69: 11–42, doi:10.1353/jmh.2005.0059, S2CID 159829515
- Swope, Kenneth M. (2009), A Dragon's Head and a Serpent's Tail: Ming China and the First Great East Asian War, 1592–1598, University of Oklahoma Press
- Turnbull, Stephen (2002), Samurai Invasion: Japan's Korean War 1592–98, Cassell & Co, ISBN 978-0-304-35948-6
- Turnbull, Stephen (2008), The Samurai Invasion of Korea 1592-98, Osprey Publishing Ltd
