= Pyongsan Shin clan =

Korean clan from North Hwanghae Province

- Country: Korea
- Current region: Pyongsan County
- Founder: Sin Sung-gyŏm

- Pyongsan Shin clan
- Hangul: 평산 신씨
- Hanja: 平山 申氏
- RR: Pyeongsan Sinssi
- MR: P'yŏngsan Sinssi

The Pyongsan Shin clan (Korean: 평산 신씨) is a clan of the Shin family, originating from Korea. The founding member of the clan participated in the foundation of the Goryeo dynasty and gained its power during this time. The founder was bestowed this last name from King Taejo of Goryeo for his services. He did not have a last name prior to that. However, it became less prominent during the following Joseon dynasty.

The old name of Pyongsan was Pyeongju (Korean: 평주), hence the alternative older name for the clan the Pyongju Shin clan (Korean: 평주 신씨).

Not all Koreans with the family name Shin belong to the Pyongsan Shin clan; only about 600,000 (about 70%) hail from this clan. Others belong to other unrelated clans, such as the Goryeong Shin clan, who produced 19th and 20th century notables as Shin Chae-ho.

Painting by Sa An-do : Sin Sung-gyŏm hitting a goose with an arrow above Pyongsan, Korea.

== Clan history during the Goryeo period (918-1392) ==
The Pyongsan Shin clan took its root during the 10th century, at the time of the foundation of the Goryeo Dynasty. At the beginning of the Goryeo period, the country was divided in several kingdoms fighting for supremacy over the peninsula.

The founder of the clan is generally accepted to be General Sin Sung-gyŏm, who helped Wang Kŏn found the kingdom by dethroning the tyrant Kung Ye, alongside Pae Hyŏn-gyŏng (배현경; 裵玄慶), Hong Yu (홍유; 洪儒), and Pok Chi-gyŏm (복지겸; 卜智謙) in 918.

As described on an official description plate at his memorial shrine in the province of Gangwon, Sin Sung-gyŏm died around 927 in a battle in present-day Daegu, fighting bravely to save Wang Kŏn (also referred to as King Taejo), while dressed in the King's clothes. After his death, the King bestowed upon Sin's son and Sin's brother the high aristocratic title of Jangjolgong.

According to the legend, the clan name of Pyongsan Shin was given to Sin Sung-gyŏm before his death, during a hunting trip with King Taejo. A skillful archer, Sin successfully hit "the left wing of the third goose among the flying geese". King Taejo was impressed and bestowed Sin with the land area, Pyongsan, over which the geese had been flying, hence the family line originated there. The area is currently situated in the North Korean province of Hwanghae.

== Clan history during the Joseon period (1392-1910) ==
During the Joseon era, the Pyongsan Shin family developed into one of many yangban families. As other yangban of the time, members of the Pyongsan Shin clan successfully passed the gwageo, or the national civil service examinations. There was no hereditary aristocracy in Korea during the Joseon era, as the bureaucracy was filled by tested and certified professionals. Having peaked during the Goryeo era, the Pyongsan Shin clan produced fewer individuals of national prominence during this era.

== Notable people ==
- Sin Sung-gyŏm, clan progenitor and Goryeo general
- Shin Saimdang (1504 – 1551), Joseon dynasty artist and poet
- Sin Rip (1546 – 1592), Joseon dynasty general
- Shin Ryu (1619 – 1680), Joseon dynasty general
- Shin Jae-hyo (1812 – 1884), Joseon pansori theoretician
- Shin Dol-seok (1878 – 1908), Korean righteous army leader
- Shin Pal-gyun (1882 – 1924), Korean independence activist
- Sin Ik-hui (1894 – 1956), South Korean politician, Speaker of the National Assembly
- Shin Hyun-hwak (1920 – 2007), South Korean politician, Prime Minister
- Nelly Shin (born 1972), Korean-Canadian politician, MP for Port Moody—Coquitlam (2019 – 2022)
