= Shin Gye-am =

Korean translator (fl. 17th century)

- Hangul: 신계암
- Hanja: 申繼黯
- RR: Sin Gyeam
- MR: Sin Kyeam

Sin Gye-am (fl. 1620s–1630s) was a Jurchen and Manchu interpreter during the middle period of Korea's Joseon dynasty. He belonged to the Pyeongsan Sin bongwan. Beginning in 1629, he went to Shenyang, then the Qing dynasty capital, to study the Manchu language and its new script. By 1637, he had translated five works from the old Jurchen script into the new Manchu script, and would go on to translate more. Among the works he translated were Geohwa (巨化), Gunan (仇難), Palsea (八歲兒), Soaron (小兒論), and Sangseo (尙書). He was also involved in the compilation of textbooks used for teaching Manchu to Koreans, and served as an interpreter for Korean prisoners of war captured by Qing forces during the second Manchu invasion of Korea.
