= Lee (Korean surname) =

Korean family name (이; 리)

- Pronunciation: [iː] or [ɾiː]
- Language: Korean

Origin
- Language: Korean
- Origin: Korean
- Meaning: 이 or 리 (Note: 李 is 리 (Ri) in North Korea and mostly 이 (I) in South Korea. However, 이 (I) in South Korea usually use "Lee" as their English surname.); 李: plum; 이 only; 異: different; 伊: that
- Region of origin: Korean Peninsula

Other names
- Variant forms: Ee, I, Yi, Ri, Rhee, Rhie, Reeh
- See also: Li, Lý

Korean name
- Hangul: 이; 리
- Hanja: 李; 異; 伊
- RR: I; Ri
- MR: I; Ri

Percentage of family names based on the 2000 South Korean Census Kim, Gim Lee, I, Yi, Ri, Rhee, Reeh Park, Bak, Bahk, Pak Choi, Choe Jung, Jeong, Chung, Cheong

Lee, I, or Yi (Korean: 이; 리) is the second-most-common surname in Korea, behind Kim (김). As of the South Korean census of 2015, there were 7,306,828 people by this name in South Korea or 14.7% of the population.

Historically, 李 was written as Ni (니) in Korea. The spelling formally changed to I (이) in 1933 when the initial sound rule (두음 법칙) was established. In the McCune–Reischauer romanization of North Korea, it is romanized as Ri (리) because there is no distinction between the alveolar liquids /l/ and /r/ in modern Korean.

== Latin-alphabet spelling ==
Though the Revised Romanization spelling of this surname is I, South Korea's National Institute of the Korean Language noted in 2001 that one-letter surnames were quite rare in English and other foreign languages and could cause difficulties when traveling abroad. However, the NIKL still hoped to promote systemic transcriptions for use in passports, and thus recommended that people who bore this surname should spell it Yi in the Roman alphabet.

However, the majority of South Koreans with this surname continue to spell it as Lee, because conditions for changing passport names are strict. In a study based on 2007 application data for South Korean passports, it was found that 98.5% of people with this surname spelled it in Latin letters as "Lee" in their passports, while only 1.0% spelled it "Yi".

Romanisation of "이" has varied greatly. A few people with this surname historically spelled it Ye, as in Ye Wanyong of the Korean Empire. Rhee has also been used, as in Syngman Rhee and Simon Hang-bock Rhee. Still others use Rieh, as in Sun-Young Rieh.

== Clans ==
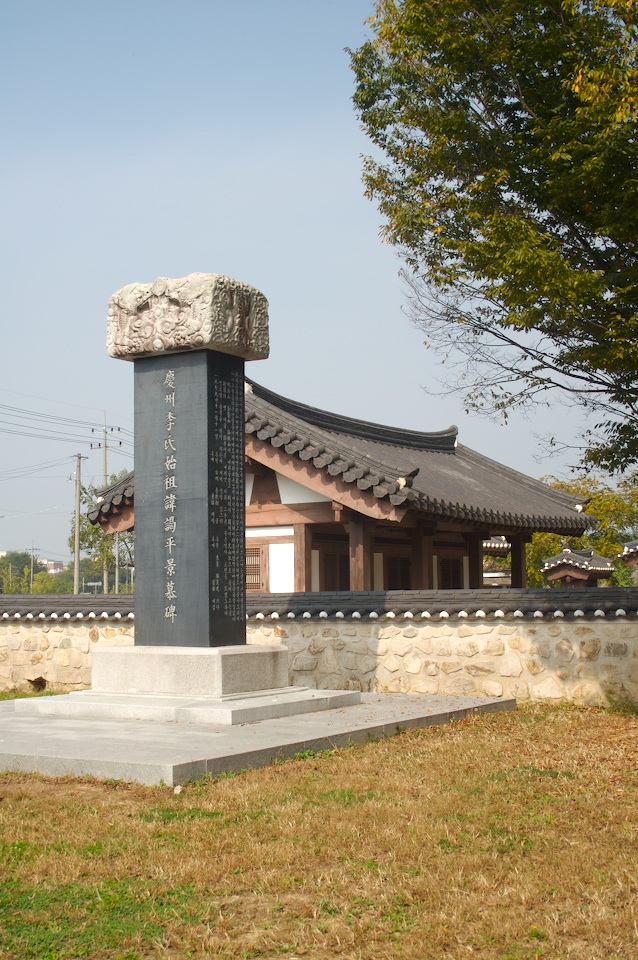
A memorial for the founder of the Gyeongju Yi clan

As with all Korean family names, the holders of the Yi surname are divided into patrilineal clans, or lineages, known in Korean as bon-gwan, based on their ancestral seat. Most such clans trace their lineage back to a specific founder, and are generally not related to one another. This system was at its height under the yangban aristocracy of Joseon, but it remains in use today. There are approximately 241 such clans claimed by South Koreans, with most people in Korea with the surname Yi (李) belonging to either the Jeonju or Gyeongju clans. Surnames Yi (異) and Yi (伊) each have their own clans.

=== Jeonju clan ===
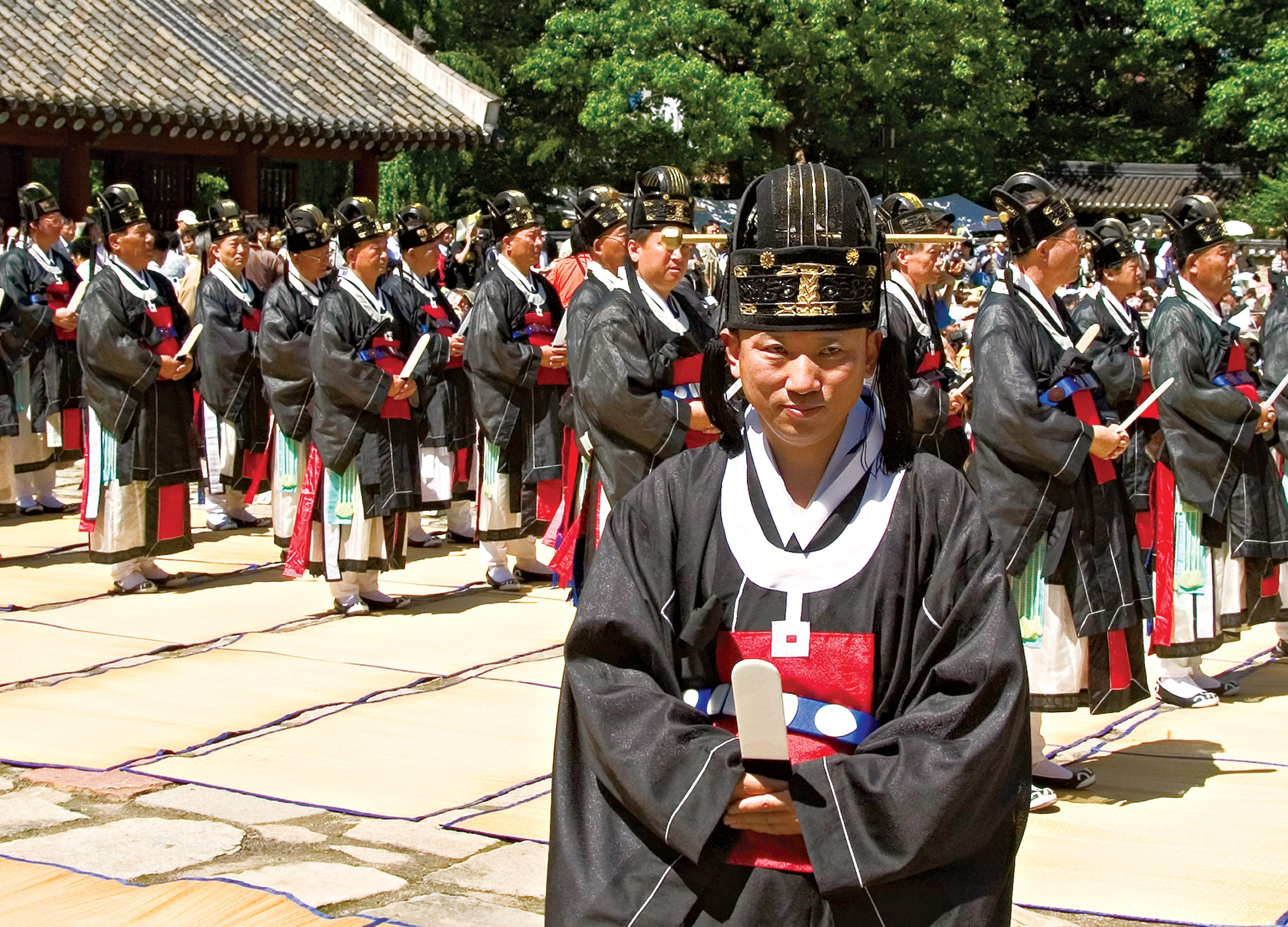
The Jeonju Yi family performs rites (jongmyo jerye) to honor their ancestors in an annual ceremony which has been declared an Intangible Cultural Heritage by the Korean government.

The founder of this clan was Yi Han, a native of Baekje who later married a Silla princess and became a high-ranking official in Silla. His 22nd-generation descendant, Yi Seong-gye, went on to found the Joseon Dynasty. The House of Yi ruled the country for 518 years (between 1392 and 1910) and established many of the cultural, artistic and linguistic foundations for modern-day Korea.

Family seal of the Jeonju Yi clan

During its reign, the House of Yi consolidated its effective rule over the territory of current Korea, which encouraged the entrenchment of Confucian ideals and doctrines in Korean society, imported and adapted Chinese culture, and promoted classical Korean culture, trade, science, literature, and technology.

As of 2005, the pretender to the Joseon throne is Yi Seok. Members of the different branches of Jeonju Yi survived until the formation of the current Republic of Korea. Many families claim membership in the House of Yi, but few actually descend from this lineage. South Korea's first president, Syngman Rhee, claims descent from the lineage.

=== Gyeongju clan ===
Family seal of the Gyeongju Lee clan

The founder of the Gyeongju clan was Yi Al-pyeong (李謁平), one of the village headmen who chose Park Hyeokgeose as the first King of Silla. According to the Samguk Sagi, the Yi name was officially bestowed on the family by King Yuri around 9 CE.

The Gyeongju Yi clan, according to the 2000 South Korean census, numbered over 1.4 million individuals.

The clan also had alternative older names such as the Wolseong Lee clan (月城李氏) and the Gyerim Lee clan (鷄林李氏).

=== Jinwi clan ===
The Jinwi Lee clan is based on the old names of Jinwi-gun, the current Gyeonggi Province, Pyeongtaek-si, and Jinwi-myeon. The Jinwi Lee clan involved in political education for the royal family and served as an adviser to the king and teacher to the crown prince for generations of Goryeo Dynasty. The Jinwi clan is a family that turned out six queens during the Joseon Dynasty. Lee Bang, who served as an adviser to the king and a teacher to the crown prince in the early Goryeo Dynasty, is the founder. Lee Bang's ancestors are the descendant of Lee Geomyeong, an ancestor of Gyeongju Lee Clan.

=== Pyeongchang clan ===
The founder of the Pyeongchang clan was Yi Gwang, an official and military commander during the Joseon Dynasty. Yi Seung-hun, who was the first person that brought Catholicism to Korea, was a member of this clan. This was a yangban clan, founded somewhere between 1580 and 1607.

=== Deoksu clan ===
The founder of this clan was Yi Dong-su, an official of the Goryeo period. This was a prominent yangban clan during the Joseon Dynasty, producing figures including the legendary admiral Yi Sun-sin and the highly influential government official and philosopher Yi I. The clan takes immense pride in producing both Korea's top military commander and arguably top scholar. Both Yi Sun-shin and Yi I are depicted on South Korea's money and have taekwondo forms named in their honor. The clan seat, corresponds to Deoksu-hyeon, an old division of what is now Kaepung County, North Korea.

=== Jinbo clan ===
The Jinbo Yi clan was known for the famous Joseon scholar Yi Hwang, who founded the Yeongnam School and started a private Confucian academy. He also became one of the 18 Sages of Korea (동방 18현). The progenitor of this clan was Yi Seok of the Goryeo Dynasty.

=== Seongju clan ===
The founder of this clan was Yi Sun-yu, a prominent official of late Silla. His 12th-generation descendant, Yi Jang-gyeong, was also a prominent official during the Goryeo Dynasty. Eight generations of Jang Kyung's descendants yielded 75 civil examination qualifiers. As of the 2000 census, 186,188 Koreans of the Seongju Yi clan live in South Korea.

=== Hongju clan ===
The founder of the Hongju Yi clan was Yi Yu-seong, a member of the King's inner circle during late Goryeo. The clan's ancestral seat was bestowed when his 9th generation descendant, Yi Gi-jong, was titled. Hongyang/Hongju is located in present-day Hongseong County, South Chungcheong Province. Especially during the late Goryeo and early Joseon Dynasties, the Hongju Yi clan produced many influential people, including Yi Jong-jang.

=== Yeonan clan ===
The Yeonan Yi clan were aristocrats during the Joseon Dynasty. Several members were Chief State Councillors. The clan also had a high number of Chief Scholars during that period. The progenitor was Yi Mu, who came from Tang China.

=== Hansan clan ===
It is based in Hansan-myeon, Seocheon County, South Chungcheong Province. There are two different branches (Hojanggong family and Kwonjigong family). The founder of this clan is Yi Yoon-kyung. One member of the clan is Yi Saek, a Confucian scholar during late Goryeo. He founded an academy that educated the founders of Joseon. The Hansan Yi clan also produced many scholars in the Joseon Dynasty such as Yi San-hae. Modern figures belonging to Hansan Yi clan include Yi Sang-jae, an independence activist during the Japanese occupation.

== See also ==
- List of Korean surnames
