= Yi Il =

Korean general (1538–1601)

- 이일
- Born: 1538; Yongin, Joseon
- Died: 1601 (aged 62–63); Chongpyong, Joseon
- Military career
- Allegiance: Joseon
- Branch: Army
- Service years: 1558–1601
- Rank: Second junior rank
- Nickname: Junggyeong
- Conflicts: Imjin War: Battle of Sangju (1592); Battle of Chungju; Battle of Imjin River (1592); Siege of Pyongyang (1593)

Korean name
- Hangul: 이일
- Hanja: 李鎰
- RR: I Il
- MR: I Il

Courtesy name
- Hangul: 중경
- Hanja: 重卿
- RR: Junggyeong
- MR: Chunggyŏng

Posthumous name
- Hangul: 장양
- Hanja: 壯襄
- RR: Jangyang
- MR: Changyang

Yi Il (Korean: 이일; Hanja: 李鎰; 1538–1601) was a Korean military official of the mid-Joseon Period. During the reign of Seonjo of Joseon, he made a great contribution to the conquest of the Jurchen people in the north. When Imjin War occurred, he was appointed Mobile Border Commander (순변사; 巡邊使). He was defeated in Sangju and Chungju but, he contributed to the restoration of Pyongyang.

== Biography ==
Yi Il was born in 1538. In 1558, Yi passed the military examination (무과; 武科) and served as Naval Commander of Left Jeolla Province (전라좌수사; 全羅左水使). In 1583, when Nitangjie (니탕개; 尼湯介) and the Wild Jurchens rebelled against the Joseon government in Kyongwon County and Jongseong, Yi was assigned magistrate of Kyongwon and repelled the rebel forces. In 1586, as Nitangjie rebelled again in Hoeryong, Yi had swept base of rebel forces as magistrate of Hoeryong and Yi became Army Commander of Hamgyong Province (함경병사; 咸鏡兵使) in recognition of his contribution. Yi also expended Chesŭngbangnyak (제승방략; 制勝方略), the book on military strategy in the Joseon period. In 1587, when he was Commandant of Hamgyong Province, He detained Yi Kyŏngnok, magistrate of Kyonghung and Yi Sun-sin, Subarea Commander of Chosan (조산만호; 造山萬戶), holding them responsible for losing battle after being ambushed by the Jurchen while harvesting at Noktundo. Later, Yi attacked Jurchen in revenge for their invasion. In the attack, Yi killed about 380 soldiers of Jurchen and burnt about 200 houses. In 1588 and 1589, Yi discussed national defense in frontier with Sin Rip and Chŏng Ŏnsin as Commander of Army Commander of Jeolla Province (전라병사; 全羅兵使).

In 1592, when the Imjin War occurred, Yi was Mobile Border Commander. On 24 April 1592, Yi fought against Japan at the Battle of Sangju. Yi organized a unit about 800 soldiers but they were unstructured. Yi started to train with the rest of them on 25 April. They were defeated by Japan being ambushed. Yi had run off to Chungju and met Sin Rip. Sin Rip tried to kill Yi taking responsibility for the defeat, but Yi wasn't killed because Kim Yŏmul stopped Sin Rip. Yi's apology was accepted since he was an experienced general. Yi participated in Battle of Chungju with Sin Rip and he was defeated and pulled back to Pyongan Province once again. Yi contributed to recapture Pyongyang with forces of Ming by winning Siege of Pyongyang on 8 January 1593.

Later, he had trained the forces and when Hanyang was recaptured and the Military Training Agency (훈련도감; 訓練都監) was founded, he became the Police Chief of the Right (우포장; 右捕將) and concentrated on training soldiers as the Left Initiate (좌지사; 左知事). Yi settled the rebellion of Song Yujin as Mobile Border Commander. In 1601, Yi died in Chongpyong while he was being transported on the suspicion of murder. He was buried in what is Yongin nowadays.
