= Shin Eun-mi =

Amy Chung, better known by her Korean name Shin Eun-mi (Korean: 신은미) (born c. 1961), is a Korean-American classical singer and writer who travelled to North Korea several times over 2011 to 2012. She wrote a book on her experiences travelling to North Korea, which South Korea's Ministry of Culture, Sports and Tourism named a "recommended book" in 2013. She gave a series of lectures in South Korea on the topic of her travels to North Korea. Her lectures, originally given a positive reception, later became locations of demonstrations by far-right conservatives. Shin Eun-mi was deported from South Korea on 10 January 2015.

Shin Eun-mi's book is titled A Korean American Housewife Goes to North Korea. The book is a compilation of her travel diaries while traveling North Korea.

A documentary "To Kill Alice" was made about Shin Eun-mi's experience of being deported from South Korea. (Note: The documentary in South Korea was titled (in English) "How Red Are You", but the name changed to "To Kill Alice" when it was released outside of South Korea) The film was made by director Kim Sang-kyu.
