= Shin Saimdang =

Korean calligraphist and poet (1504–1551)

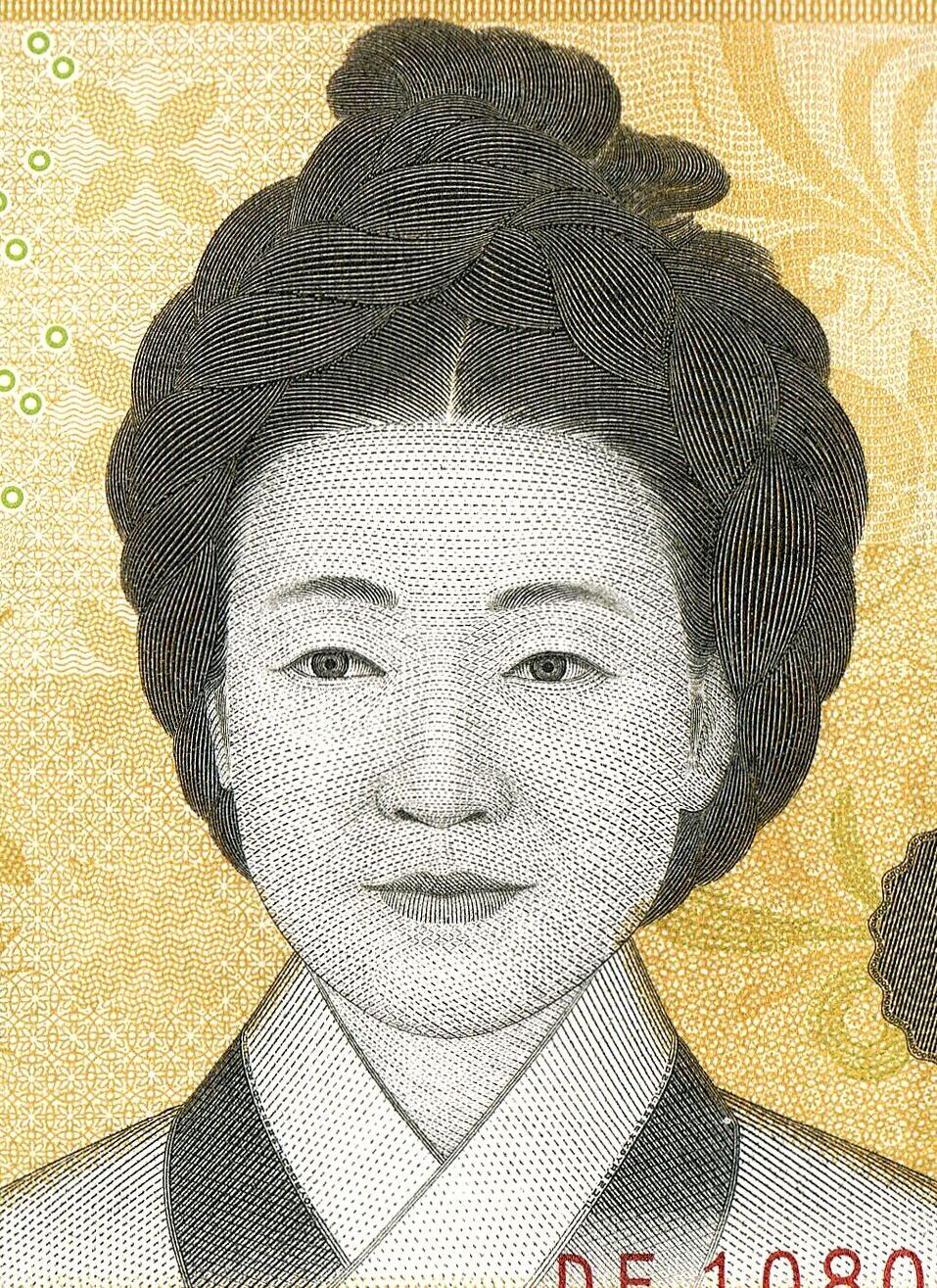
- Shin Saimdang as depicted on a South Korean won banknote
- Born: December 5, 1504; Bokpyeong-chon, Ojukheon, Gangneung, Gangwon Province, Joseon
- Died: June 20, 1551 (aged 46); Yulgok-chon, Junae-myeon, Paju County (former district of Paju), Gyeonggi Province, Joseon
- Occupations: Artist, calligraphist, poet
- Spouse: Yi Won-su (m.1522–1551)
- Children: 5 sons including Yi I, and 3 daughters
- Family: Pyongsan Shin clan

Korean name
- Hangul: 신사임당
- Hanja: 申師任堂
- RR: Sin Saimdang
- MR: Sin Saimdang

Birth name
- Hangul: 신인선
- Hanja: 申仁善
- RR: Sin Inseon
- MR: Sin Insŏn

Shin Saimdang (Korean: 신사임당; Hanja: 申師任堂; December 5, 1504 – June 20, 1551 (Note: In the Korean calendar (lunar), she was born on the 29th day of 10th lunar month of 1504 and died on the 17th day of the 5th lunar month of 1551.)) was a Korean artist, writer, calligraphist, and poet, who lived during the Joseon period. She was born in Gangneung, Gangwon Province. Her birth home, Ojukheon, which is also her maternal family's home, is well-preserved to this day. She was the mother of the Korean Confucian scholar Yi I. Often held up as a model of Confucian ideals, her respectful nickname was Eojin ("Wise Mother"). Her real name was Shin In-seon (신인선; 申仁善). Her pen names were Saim (사임; 師任), Saimdang (사임당; 師任堂), Inimdang (인임당; 姻姙堂), and Imsajae (임사재; 姙師齊).

== Biography ==
=== Childhood and education ===
Shin Saimdang was born and raised in Gangneung at the home of her maternal grandparents. Her father, Shin Myeong-hwa, from the Pyongsan Shin clan, was a government official and a friend of the scholar Cho Kwangjo, but he was not politically active. Her mother was Lady Yi of the Yongin Yi clan. Lady Yi's mother, Lady Choi of the Gangneung Choi clan (강릉 최씨; 1459–?), was the third daughter of Choi Eung-hyeon (최응현; 1428–1507). Through his father, Choi Chi-on (최치온), he owned Ohjukheon (the birthplace of Saimdang and Yi I). So when his daughter, Lady Choi, married Yi Sa-on (이사온; 李思溫; 1462 – ?), it was passed down as an inheritance gift to him.

Through her paternal great-grandmother, Lady Shin was also the great-great-great-granddaughter of Queen Wongyeong and King Taejong through her great-great-grandmother, Princess Jeongseon. She was also a second cousins three removed of Shin Rip and a tenth cousin of Queen Inheon, the mother of King Injo.

Saimdang was the third of five daughters. Her father initially resided in Hanseong (modern-day Seoul), and lived largely apart from the family for 16 years. He continued his civil examination preparation with his wife's family's assistance, and visited home several times a year. Saimdang's mother assisted his studies. However, Shin Myeong-hwa did not go beyond the jinsa test (진사), an elementary test for yangban, and gave up the daegwa test (대과) due to the massacre of scholars in the year of Kimyo (기묘사화, 1519 CE). He later moved back to Gangneung.

Lady Yi had continued living with her parents after her marriage, which gave her greater autonomy in how she chose to educate Saimdang and her other daughters. Saimdang's grandfather's beliefs also greatly influenced Saimdang. Her maternal grandfather, Yi Sa-on, taught her as he would have taught a grandson.

Although she was a woman, Saimdang developed an abundant knowledge of Neo-Confucianism, history, and literature, which surprised her father's visitors. Saimdang and her sisters learned the Thousand Character Classic, Dongmongseonseup (동몽선습) and Mingxin baojian from Shin Myeong-hwa. Saimdang was especially talented, earning her father's favor. Having no brothers, she received an education that would have been bequeathed only to a son, and this background greatly influenced the way she later educated her own children.

Shin Saimdang received an education that was not common for women of that era. Besides literature and poetry, she was adept at calligraphy, embroidery, and painting. She was also gifted at writing and drawing, earning praise from Yi Suk-kwon (이숙권).

=== Marriage ===
Shin Myeong-hwa chose Commander Yi Won-su (李元秀) to become Saimdang's husband. Many people felt that this showed poor judgement, because although Yi Won-su's ancestors included Yeonguijeong (Chief State Councillor) and Jwauijeong (Left State Councillor), the family was poor. At that time, Yi Won-su was also unemployed, and his father had died. However, Shin Myeong-hwa prioritised marrying Saimdang to a man who would allow her to continue with her artwork, and Won-su had no objections to this.

On August 20, 1522, the 17-year-old Saimdang married the 22-year-old Yi Won-su, and with his consent she continued to spend time at her parents' home in Gangneung. Yi Won-su's house was in Paju, but Saimdang's father died in the same year that they got married, so she moved back and forth between the two homes in order to care for her mother. She later accompanied her husband to his official posts. She moved to several places including Hanseong and Pyeongchang.

The couple had eight children: five boys and three girls. At the age of 33, she went back to Gangneung to give birth to her third son, Yi I. In 1537, on her return to Hanseong with her baby, she stood on top of a hill at Daegwallyeong and looked back at a village she had just passed. She expressed her love for her mother through a new poem. Aged 38, she managed a new house in Hanseong and lived with her mother.

In this era, obedience was considered an important mark of a good wife, but Saimdang did not listen to her husband Yi Won-su easily. Promising 10 years of separation for his study, she sent her husband to a good mountain. When he came back yearning for his wife, she reprimanded him, threatening to cut off her hair if he didn't study hard. In spite of her efforts, Yi Won-su quit studying after 3 years.

=== Conflict with her husband ===
She noticed that her husband, Yi Won-su, loved a kisaeng named Kwon. When Yi Won-su began living with Kwon, Saimdang strongly disapproved of it and the couple's relationship cooled. Shin Saimdang, who foresaw her death, asked her husband not to marry another woman after she died. Yi Won-su argued that Confucius, Zengzi, and Zhou Dunyi had broken their marriages, but Shin Saimdang contradicted him by telling him that none of those people had remarried. Kwon was considered to be a rash girl who acted unpredictably, the opposite of Shin Saimdang, and it was also said that she was the same age as her eldest son, Yi Seon. When Shin Saimdang discovered the presence of Kwon, she once again asked her husband not to invite Kwon to their home. Quoting the Confucian scriptures, she tried to convince him not to marry Kwon, and to promise not to bring her into their home. Yi Won-su and Shin Saimdang's bad relationship also affected their children. Since his parents' marital relations were not good, Yi I wanted a peaceful family life.

=== Death ===
Yi I loved his mother dearly, so when Shin Saimdang got sick, he went to the shrine where his maternal grandfather's spirit tablet was kept, and prayed for his mother for one hour every day. The family members who were searching for the missing Yi I were moved when they found the young child sincerely praying in hopes of his mother recovering. Despite his efforts, her illness got worse. Shin Saimdang died suddenly after moving to the Pyongan region, on May 17, 1551, at the age of 46. As a result of her death, her son Yi I wandered about with questions about the cause of life and death.

After her death, Yi Won-su didn't marry Kwon, but broke his wife's promise by bringing her to live with him and his children, causing conflict with Yi I. Unlike Shin Saimdang who was a gentle and caring mother, Kwon liked to drink. Shin Saimdang's children suffered because of Kwon, and Yi I ran away from home. It is unclear why Yi Won-su made the unreasonable move to bring in Kwon, but it is also believed that it was caused by jealousy and inferiority towards his wife, Shin Saimdang.

Along with Queen Munjeong, Jeong Nan-jeong, and Hwang Jin-yi, Shin Saimdang is considered one of the most significant women to live during this period of Korean history.

== Works ==
In Joseon, women were discouraged from broadcasting their gifts and talents to the world after marriage. However, Saimdang was able to develop her talents in part because she had no brothers, so she was able to live at her home instead of her husband's, and because her father sought to select a son-in-law who would let Saimdang develop her skills as much as possible.

Shin Saimdang's artwork is known for its delicate beauty; insects, flowers, butterflies, orchids, grapes, fish, and landscapes were some of her favorite themes. Approximately 40 paintings of ink and stonepaint colors remain, although it is believed that many others exist.

Unfortunately, not much of her calligraphy remains, but her style was greatly praised in her time, with high-ranking officials and connoisseurs writing records of her work. The scholar Eo Suk-kwon of Myeongjong mentioned in his book Paegwan Japgi (패관잡기, 稗官雜記; "The Storyteller's Miscellany") that Saimdang's paintings of grapes and landscapes compared to those of the notable artist Ahn Gyeon. In 1868, upon admiring the work of Saimdang, the governor of Gangneung remarked that "Saimdang's calligraphy is thoughtfully written, with nobility and elegance, serenity and purity, filled with the lady's virtue".

Her children also possessed artistic talent. For example, Yi U was so talented in the art that there is an anecdote that "He drew insects using muk, and then the chickens were chasing after it since it looked like real insects." Yi U was also talented in poetry. His brother Yi I said: "If Yi U concentrated in scholarship, he would be better than me." Shin Saimdang's eldest daughter, Yi Mae-chang, was also good at poetry and therefore known as "Little Shin Saimdang".

=== Poetry ===
- Looking Back at my Parents' Home while Going Over Daegwallyeong Pass (유대관령망친정; 踰大關嶺望親庭) – Poem written while leaving her parents' house, grief-stricken from leaving her mother alone.
- Thinking of Parents (사친; 思親) – A poem about filial devotion to her mother.

=== Paintings ===
- Landscape (자리도; 紫鯉圖)
- Mountains and rivers (산수도; 山水圖)
- Grass and insect painting (초충도; 草蟲圖)
- Geese among reeds (노안도; 蘆雁圖)
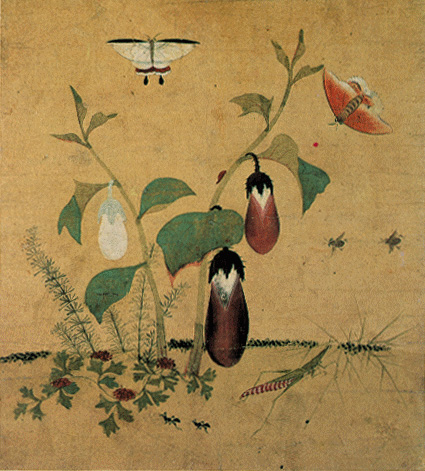
Chochungdo, a painting genre initiated by Shin Saimdang, depicting plants and insects.(chochungdo) Eggplant & grasshopper

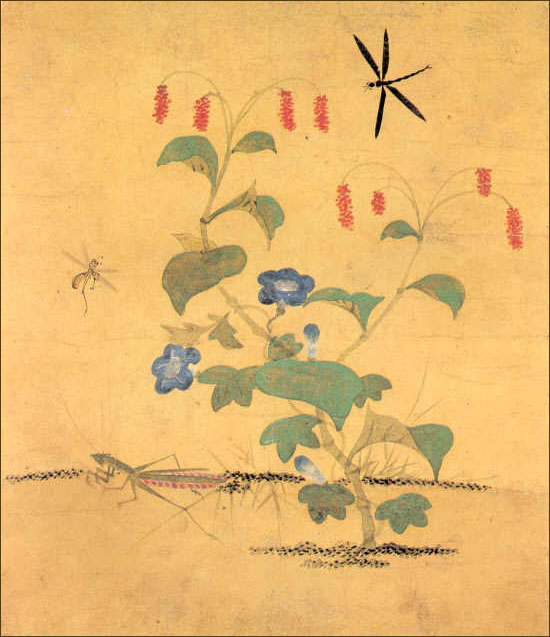
Chochungdo

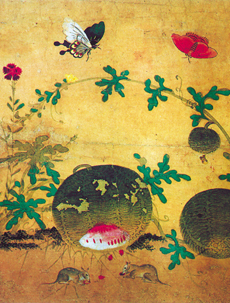
Chochungdo

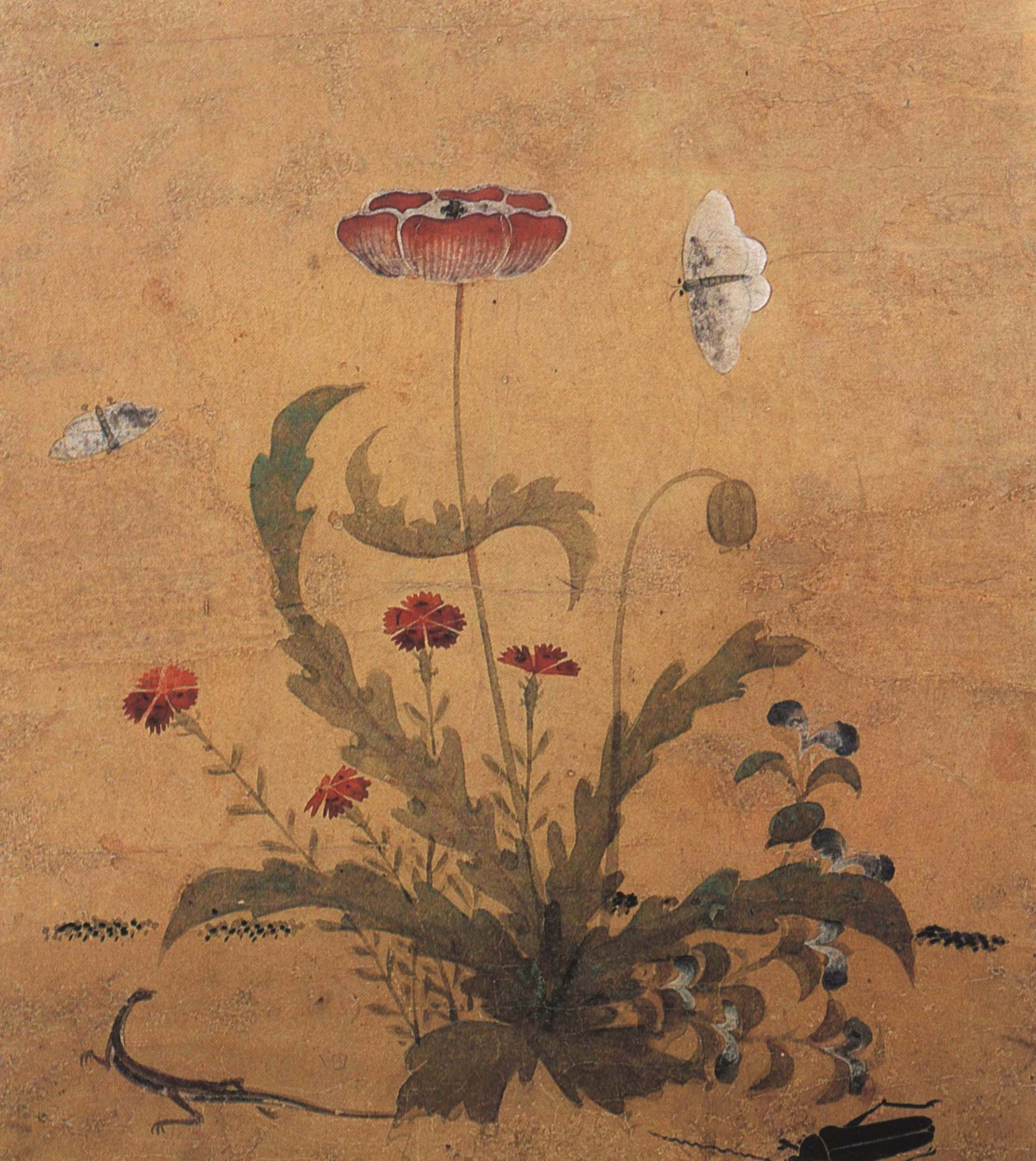
Chochungdo

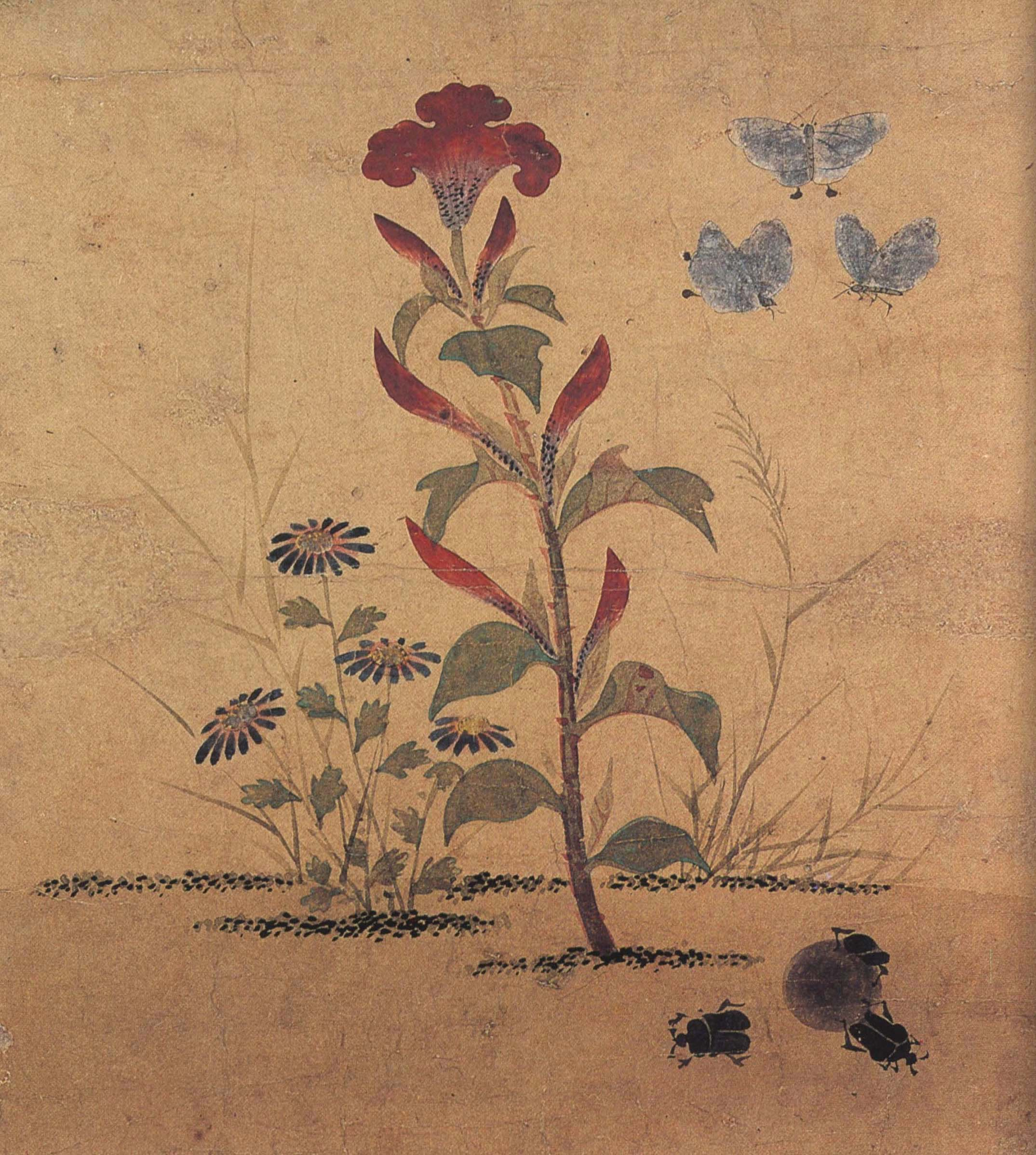
Chochungdo

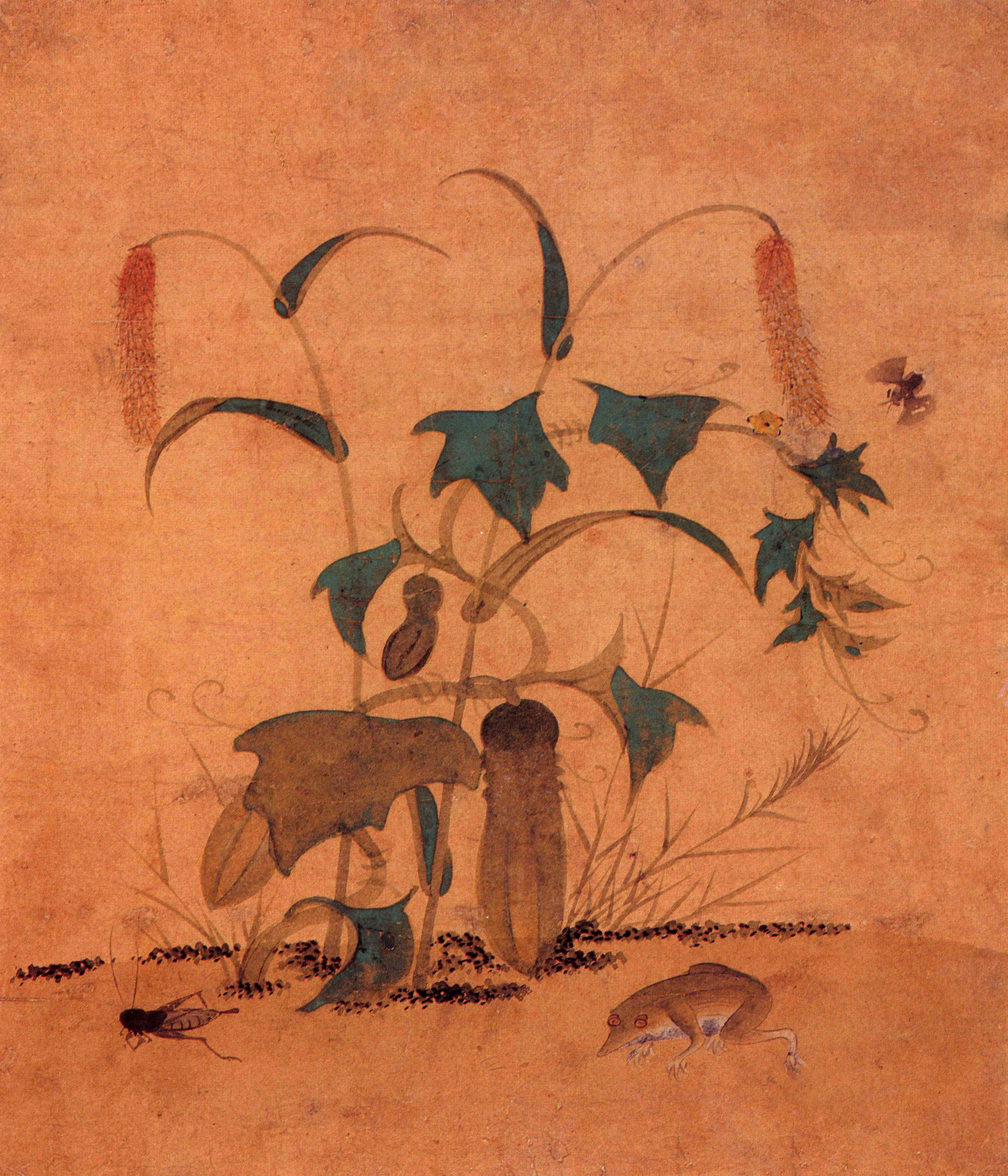
Chochungdo

== Legacy ==
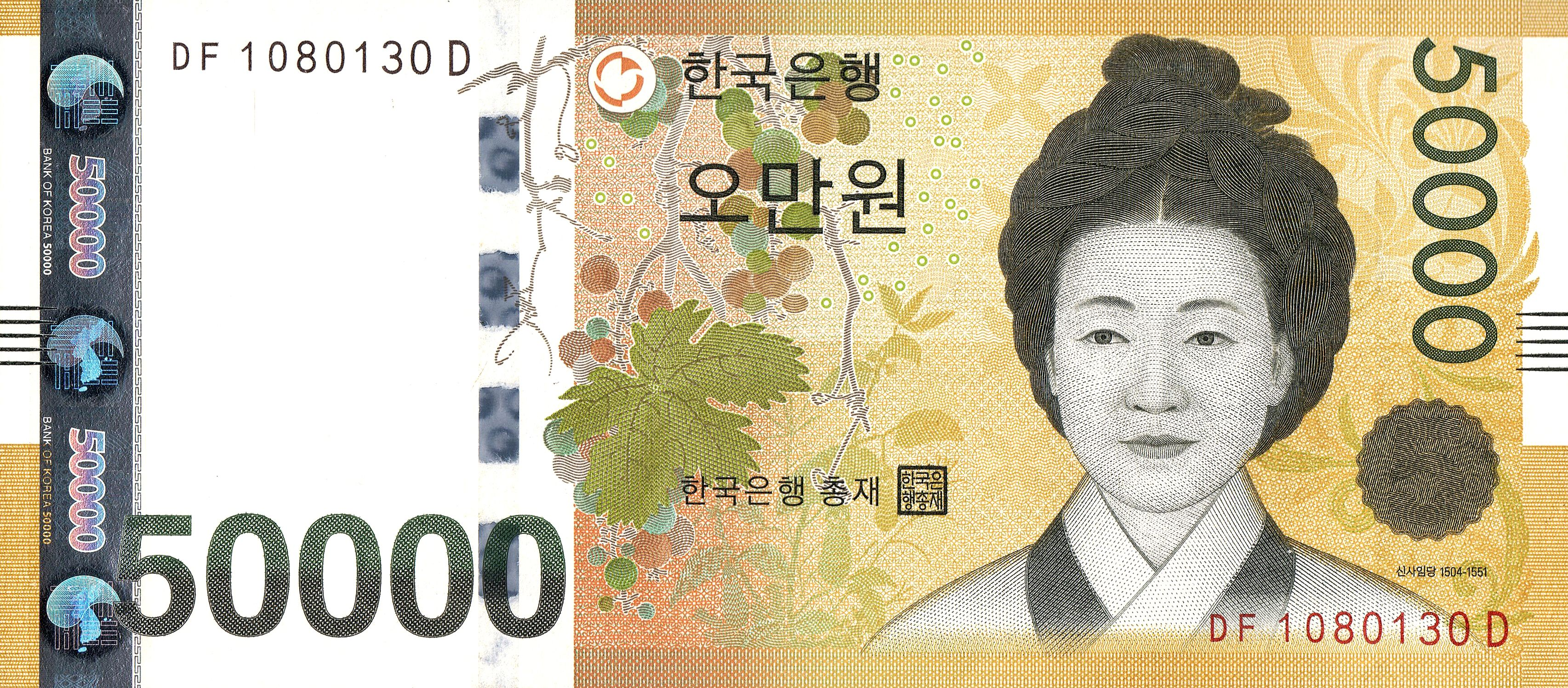
50,000 KRW note

Shin Saimdang is the first woman to appear on a South Korean banknote. The Bank of Korea (BOK; 한국은행) first issued the 50,000 won note in June 2009. The design of the 50,000 won was released on February 25, 2009. A portrait of Shin Saimdang and her drawings, Mokpo Grapes (묵포 포도) and Chochungdosubyeong (초충도수병, the National Treasure No. 595) were illustrated on the front. Paintings (wolmaedo and pungjugdo) were illustrated on the back side. Unlike other bills, the illustrations on the back of this bill were illustrated vertically. On May 5, The Bank of Korea announced that they selected Shin Saimdang as the main character of 50,000 won because she is "a representative female artist in the middle of the Joseon period" and "a person who has accomplished a remarkable achievement in gifted education by fulfilling her wife role". The reason for the selection is that it is expected to contribute to raising awareness of gender equality in Korean society and to raise the importance of education and family. (Other candidate characters of 50,000 won were Kim Ku, Gwanggaeto the Great, Ahn Chang-ho, Chang Yŏngsil, and Yu Gwan-sun).

Feminist critics, however, have criticized this selection as reinforcing sexist stereotypes about women's roles.

== Family ==
- Father
  - Shin Myeong-hwa (신명화; 申命和; 1476–1522)
- Mother
  - Lady Yi of the Yongin Yi clan (용인 이씨; 龍仁 李氏; 1480 – ?)
- Sibling(s)
  - Older sister - Lady Shin of the Pyongsan Shin clan (평산 신씨; 平山 申氏; 1497 – ?); Yi Ju-nam’s first wife
  - Older sister - Lady Shin of the Pyongsan Shin clan (평산 신씨; 平山 申氏; 1502 – ?)
  - Younger sister - Lady Shin of the Pyongsan Shin clan (평산 신씨; 平山 申氏; 1508 – ?)
  - Younger sister - Lady Shin of the Pyongsan Shin clan (평산 신씨; 平山 申氏; 1511 – ?)
- Husband
  - Yi Won-su (이원수; 李元秀) of the Deoksu Yi clan (덕수 이씨; 德水 李氏; 1500 – 14 May 1561)
- Issue
  - Son - Yi Seon (이선; 李璿; 1524 – ?)
  - Daughter - Yi Mae-chang (이매창; 李梅窓), Lady Yi of the Deoksu Yi clan (덕수 이씨; 德水 李氏; 1529 – ?)
  - Son - Yi Beon (이번; 李璠; 1531–1590)
  - Son - Yi I (이이; 李珥; 7 January 1537 – 27 February 1584)
  - Son - Yi Woo (이우; 李瑀; 1542–1609)
  - Daughter - Lady Yi of the Deoksu Yi clan (덕수 이씨; 德水 李氏; 1547 – ?)
  - Daughter - Lady Yi of the Deoksu Yi clan (덕수 이씨; 德水 李氏; 1550 – ?)

== In modern culture ==
- Portrayed by Ko Eun-ah in the 1978 film Scholar Yul-gok and His Mother Shin Saimdang.
- Portrayed by Kim Ye-ryeong and Jeong In-sun in the 2003 EBS TV series Yeoksa Theater.
- Portrayed by Kim Ye-ryeong in the 2005 EBS TV series Jump.
- Portrayed by Lee Young-ae and Park Hye-su in the 2017 SBS TV series Saimdang, Memoir of Colors.

== See also ==
- Good Wife, Wise Mother
- History of Korea
- Korean painting
