= Shin Pal-gyun =

Korean independence activist (1882–1924)

- Hangul: 신팔균
- Hanja: 申八均
- RR: Sin Palgyun
- MR: Sin P'algyun

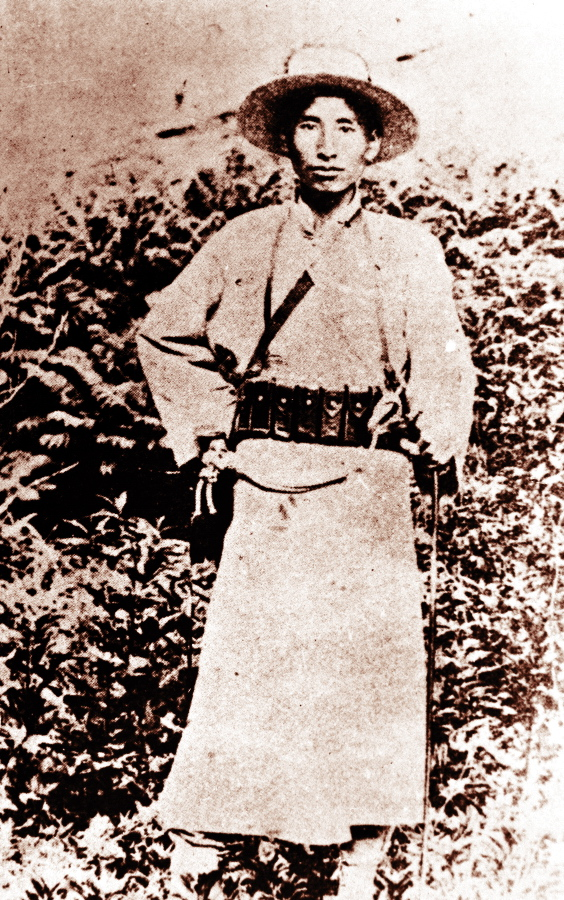
Shin Pal-gyun

Shin Pal-gyun (Korean: 신팔균; Hanja: 申八均, May 19, 1882 – July 2, 1924) or Shin Dong-chun (신동천; 申東川) was an independence activist of Korea. His wife Im Su-myung (임수명) was an independence activist also.

== Biography ==
Shin Pal-gyun was born in Seoul on May 19, 1882. His great-great-grandfather Shin Hong-ju, grandfather Shin-hun, and father Shin Seok-hee were all high-ranking military officers. Especially his father Shin Seok-hee was the officer that negotiationed Treaty of Ganghwa and Joseon-America Treaty. So Shin Pal-hyun naturally grew up a soldier of Korean Empire. He graduated the Military Academy and he became a military officer in 1903.

In 1907, the Korean army was disorganizationed by Japan. In 1909, he decided to start the independence movement. After Japan-Korea Annexation Treaty, fled to Manchuria and Primorsky Krai, and settled in West Jiandao. He joined Shinheung Military Academy. He worked there as an instructor and he trained many independence activists. At the same time he graduated Imperial Japanese Army Academy and worked there. He met Chi Ch'ŏngch'ŏn and Kim Gyeong-chun at Manchuria. These three men decided to have names which includes '天'(means 'sky' in Chinese). Shin Pal-gyun's artificial name was Shin Dong-chun.

In 1920, he went to South Manchuria and participated in independence movement organisation. He used to fight against Japanese police in North Pyongan Province.

In 1924, when he was doing the outdoor discipline, he was assassinated by a Chinese mounted bandit who was employed by Japanese force.
