= Chungju =

City in North Chungcheong, South Korea

- Municipal City
- Panoramic view of Chungju

- Flag Emblem of Chungju

- Location in South Korea
- Coordinates: 36°58′N 127°57′E
- Country: South Korea
- Region: Hoseo
- Administrative divisions: 1 eup, 12 myeon, 12 dong

Government
  - Mayor: Don Lee (이동석)

Population (September 2024)
  - Total: 207,369
  - Dialect: Chungcheong
- Time zone: UTC+9 (Korea Standard Time)

Korean name
- Hangul: 충주시
- Hanja: 忠州市
- RR: Chungju-si
- MR: Ch'ungju-si

Chungju (Korean: 충주) is a city in North Chungcheong Province, South Korea.

The city is famous for the annual martial arts festival held in October, and for being the hometown of former UN Secretary-General, Ban Ki-moon.

== Symbol ==
The city's symbols include the chrysanthemum (city flower), the Mandarin duck (city bird), and the apple tree (city tree).

== History ==
During Hideyoshi's Invasions of Korea, Chungju was the site of the Battle of Chungju, where the Korean general Shin Rip was defeated by the Japanese general Konishi Yukinaga. This defeat resulted in King Seonjo fleeing from Hanseong (Seoul) to Pyongyang.

== Chungju Lake ==
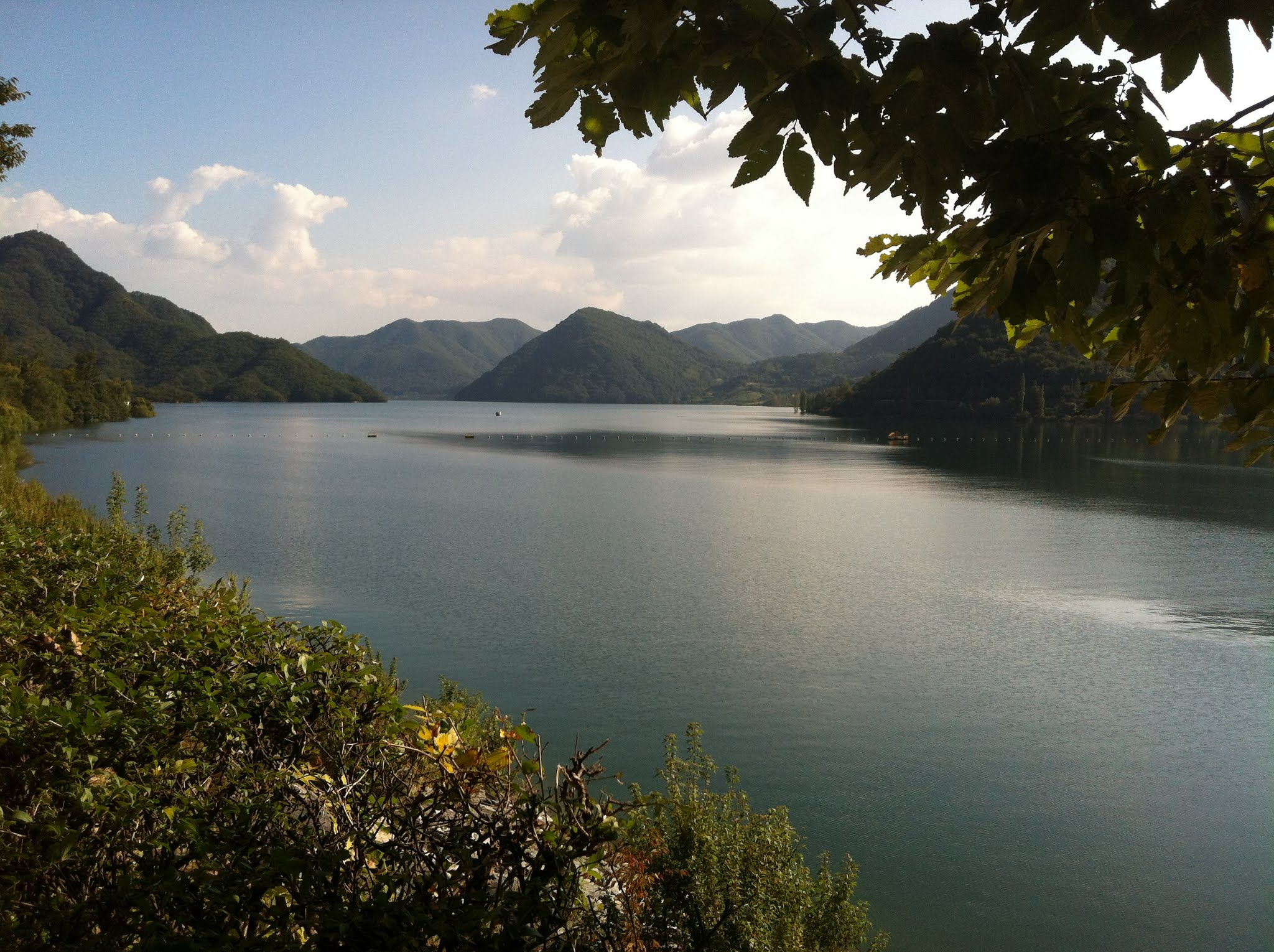

Chungju Dam is the country's largest multi-purpose dam, linking Chungju and its surrounding neighborhoods. It creates an artificial lake with a vast body of water.

Woraksan Mt and Songnae valley are located nearby. Additionally, this area has a cherished cave area/springs.

=== 2013 World Rowing Championships ===
The 2013 World Rowing Championships were held at Tangeum Lake, Chungju between August 25 – September 1.

=== Olympic and Paralympic Qualification Regatta ===
It had been intended that the Asia and Oceania Qualification Regatta for the 2020 Olympic and Paralympic Games would be held there from April 27 to 30, but it was cancelled because of the coronavirus outbreak.

== Products ==
Chungju is renowned for its apple production. The principal reasons are the large amount of daylight received and the significant temperature differences. The growing of apples started 300 years ago from China, and it was 1912 when the city officially began to plant trees. As of 2009, the apple cultivation area is 1,871 ha and production amount is 41,592. Apple production accounted for 44.6% of total production in Chungcheongbuk-do (as of 2009). The scale is the greatest in North Chungcheong Province.

== Education ==
There are two universities in Chungju: Konkuk University (Chungju campus) and Korea National University of Transportation (formed by the 2012 merger of Chungju National University and Korea National Railroad College). In addition to being home to these two Universities, Chungju also has many primary, middle, and high schools with excellent classroom facilities.

There is one international school, Chungju Chinese Elementary School.

== Climate ==
Chungju has a monsoon-influenced humid continental climate (Köppen: Dwa) with cold, dry winters and hot, rainy summers.

Climate data for Chungju (1991–2020 normals, extremes 1972–present)
Month	Jan	Feb	Mar	Apr	May	Jun	Jul	Aug	Sep	Oct	Nov	Dec	Year
Record high °C (°F)	13.8 (56.8)	22.3 (72.1)	26.2 (79.2)	33.5 (92.3)	34.7 (94.5)	35.6 (96.1)	37.9 (100.2)	40.0 (104.0)	35.2 (95.4)	30.1 (86.2)	25.5 (77.9)	17.8 (64.0)	40.0 (104.0)
Mean daily maximum °C (°F)	2.5 (36.5)	5.8 (42.4)	11.9 (53.4)	19.2 (66.6)	24.5 (76.1)	28.0 (82.4)	29.7 (85.5)	30.3 (86.5)	26.0 (78.8)	20.2 (68.4)	12.3 (54.1)	4.5 (40.1)	17.9 (64.2)
Daily mean °C (°F)	−3.2 (26.2)	−0.5 (31.1)	5.3 (41.5)	11.9 (53.4)	17.5 (63.5)	22.1 (71.8)	24.9 (76.8)	25.2 (77.4)	19.9 (67.8)	12.9 (55.2)	5.7 (42.3)	−1.3 (29.7)	11.7 (53.1)
Mean daily minimum °C (°F)	−8.3 (17.1)	−6.1 (21.0)	−0.9 (30.4)	4.8 (40.6)	10.9 (51.6)	16.8 (62.2)	21.1 (70.0)	21.3 (70.3)	15.2 (59.4)	7.1 (44.8)	0.3 (32.5)	−6.2 (20.8)	6.3 (43.3)
Record low °C (°F)	−28.5 (−19.3)	−23.0 (−9.4)	−13.9 (7.0)	−5.6 (21.9)	1.4 (34.5)	7.5 (45.5)	11.7 (53.1)	11.4 (52.5)	2.6 (36.7)	−5.9 (21.4)	−11.6 (11.1)	−21.9 (−7.4)	−28.5 (−19.3)
Average precipitation mm (inches)	20.0 (0.79)	29.4 (1.16)	41.5 (1.63)	73.8 (2.91)	87.4 (3.44)	134.7 (5.30)	293.3 (11.55)	273.0 (10.75)	140.2 (5.52)	56.7 (2.23)	39.4 (1.55)	24.9 (0.98)	1,214.3 (47.81)
Average precipitation days (≥ 0.1 mm)	6.6	6.3	8.1	8.8	8.7	9.1	16.7	14.5	9.5	6.2	8.2	7.4	110.1
Average snowy days	6.6	5.0	2.2	0.2	0.0	0.0	0.0	0.0	0.0	0.1	1.2	5.2	20.4
Average relative humidity (%)	67.0	62.2	58.1	55.1	59.5	65.8	75.1	75.5	74.9	73.6	70.8	69.6	67.3
Mean monthly sunshine hours	163.5	171.8	199.8	214.3	233.3	198.2	142.0	164.6	169.0	185.5	145.9	150.8	2,138.7
Percentage possible sunshine	54.8	57.5	54.8	59.1	55.4	50.0	39.9	46.9	50.6	55.5	49.8	52.3	51.9
Source: Korea Meteorological Administration (snow and percent sunshine 1981–2010)

== Sister cities ==
City	Division	Country	Year
Yugawara	Kanagawa Prefecture	Japan	1994
Taichung	N/A	Taiwan	1969
Musashino	Tokyo	Japan	1997
Daqing	Heilongjiang	China	2001

== Notable people ==
- Ban Ki-Moon, UN Secretary-General
- Lee Seung-hyo, actor
- Lee Geung-young, actor
- Park Jeong-min, actor
- Jung Jin-young, singer and member of B1A4
- Kwangchul Youn, South Korean operatic bass and academic voice teacher
- Kim Seon-tae, former civil servant and YouTuber
- Park Sung-woong, actor
- Jang Yoon-jeong, singer

== See also ==
- List of cities in South Korea
- Tangeum Lake
- People Power Party (South Korea)
