= Sin Rip =

Korean general (1546–1592)

- Hangul: 신립
- Hanja: 申砬
- RR: Sin Rip
- MR: Sin Rip

Courtesy name
- Hangul: 입지
- Hanja: 立之
- RR: Ipji
- MR: Ipchi

Sin Rip (Korean: 신립; Hanja: 申砬; 16 November 1546 – 7 June 1592), sometimes Shin Rip or Shin Rib, was a Korean general and a member of the Pyeongsan Sin clan.

== Biography ==
He passed the Korean national military examinations at the age of 22. Sin earned prominence by driving out the Nitanggae barbarians from the northern provinces of Joseon dynasty. Sin was a successful general who also gained renown for protecting the borders of Joseon against the Jurchen. When the fortifications at Busan fell to the Japanese at the outset of the Japanese invasions of Korea (1592–1598), Sin Rip, the Vice Minister of War, was despatched to Chungju to stop the advancing invaders. He raised a substantial force, 8,000 strong, consisting primarily of cavalry. He was joined at Chungju by Gyeongsang Provincial Governor Kim Su, who had previously collected a large force at Daegu while waiting for a general to be sent from the capital, Hanseong (modern day Seoul). When no general materialized and it was learned that the Japanese were en route, Kim's force largely evaporated.

Sin Rip was en route to the Choryeong Stronghold to block the Choryeong Pass which the Japanese would have to use to move north when he learned that Yi Il's forces had been routed at Sangju by Konishi Yukinaga's First Division and that General Yi had fled, he decided to remain at Chungju and fight the Japanese on level terrain to better employ his cavalry. This, however, left a key choke point undefended and facilitated Konishi's forces' advance northward. Sin selected a large, natural amphitheater at a place called Tangeumdae (탄금대), with mountains at one side and a curving river at the other to make his stand. The only approaches were two narrow passages at either end where the mountains met the river. Apparently Sin chose this site thinking to best employ his cavalry against a Japanese enemy that was predominantly infantry.

Modern analysts have also theorized that Sin, in light of reports of Korean forces fleeing in the heat of battle, may have contrived to lock his troops into a life or death situation where they would be forced to fight for their very survival. In the battle, Sin Rip was up against great odds. The Japanese, moreover, were equipped with a type of musket, arquebus, which Sin had not seen in action. The Japanese outnumbered the Korean cavalry by more than 2:1 (18,700 to 8,000) and Sin's cavalry were largely raw recruits plus some scattered remnants of defeated forces from the south.

On June 6, 1592, Konishi's troops advanced to crush Sin's forces. The Japanese blocked both the narrow entrances and then sent musketeers and archers to rain down a withering hail of musket balls and arrows on the Korean forces. Suddenly aware of their tactical disadvantage, many of the Korean forces broke ranks and frantically tried to escape through one or the other of the passages, but were either cut down by the Japanese or drowned in the river. A few broke through the Japanese lines and fled. Sin and his officers escaped but committed suicide rather than being taken prisoner by the Japanese.

== See also ==
- Battle of Sangju
- Battle of Chungju
- Korea
- Japanese invasions of Korea (1592–98)
