= Racism in Korea =

Racism in Korea (Korean: 인종주의 / 레이시즘; Hanja: 人種主義) may refer to:

- Racism in North Korea
- Racism in South Korea
