= Anti-Japanese sentiment in Korea =

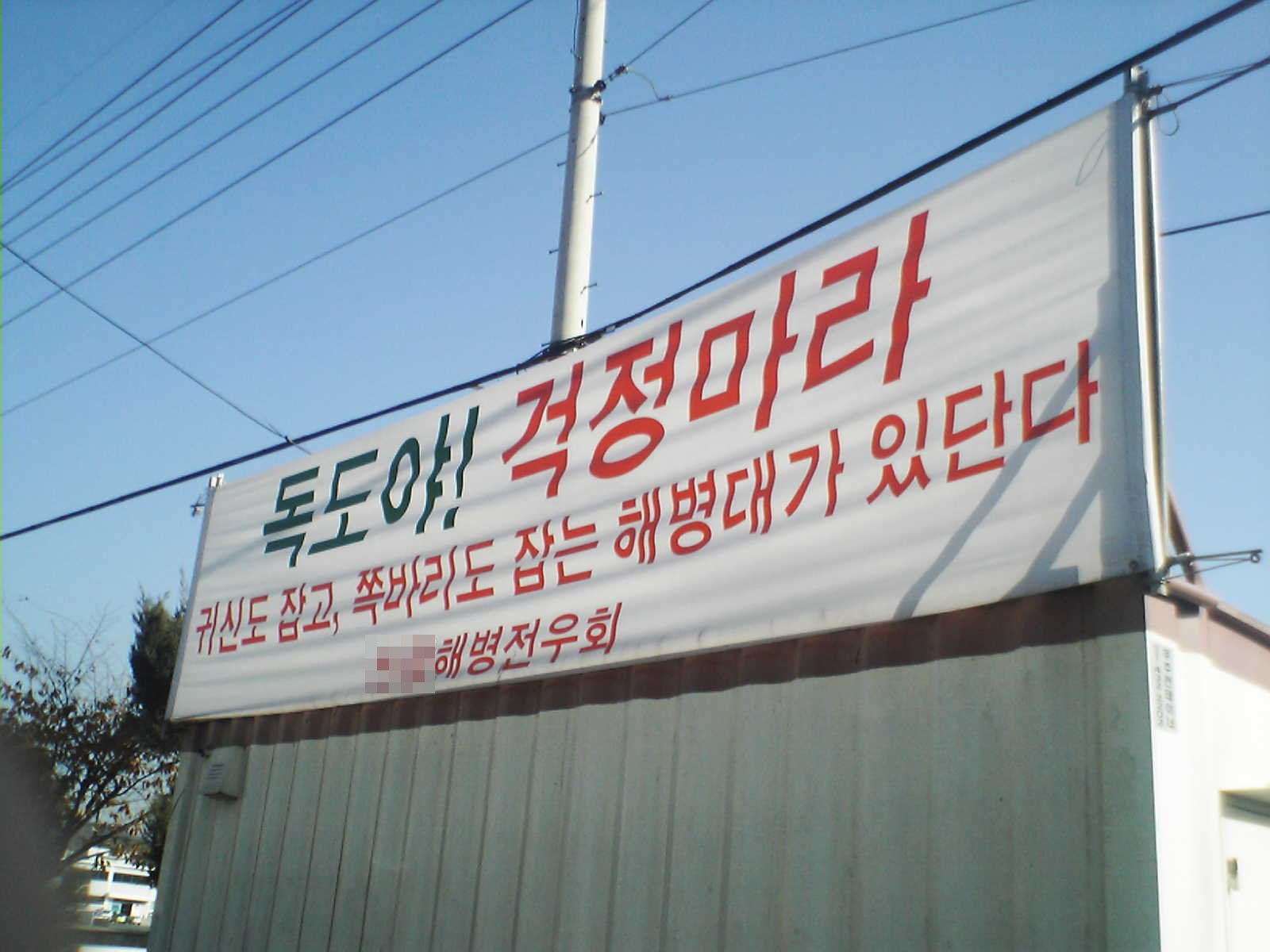
An anti-Japanese banner in Korean. The banner concerns the Liancourt Rocks dispute and refers to Japanese people as Jjokbari (쪽바리), a disparaging ethnic slur against people of Japanese ancestry. Roughly translated, the banner says "To Dokdo: Worry not, as we have the ghost-busting, Jap-hunting MARINES with us!"

Anti-Japanese sentiment (Note: Korean: 반일감정; Hanja: 反日感情; RR: Banil gamjeong) in Korean society has its roots in historic, cultural, and nationalistic sentiments.

The first recorded anti-Japanese attitudes in Korea were expressed in response to the Japanese pirate raids and the later 1592−98 Japanese invasions of Korea. Sentiments in contemporary society are largely attributed to the Japanese rule in Korea from 1910 to 1945. A survey in 2005 found that 89% of those South Koreans polled said that they "cannot trust Japan." More recently, according to a BBC World Service Poll conducted in 2013, 67% of South Koreans view Japan's influence negatively, and 21% express a positive view. This puts South Korea behind mainland China as the country with the second most negative feelings of Japan in the world.

Anti-Japanese sentiment in Korea has decreased in the 2020s; according to a poll in conducted in late 2025 by the Japanese Public Interest Incorporated Newspaper and the Communications Research Association, 56.4% of South Koreans had a favorable view of Japan, with favorability especially high in those in their 20s and 30s.

== Historical origins ==
=== Japanese invasions of Korea ===
During that time, the invading Japanese dismembered more than 20,000 noses and ears from Koreans and brought them back to Japan to create nose tombs as war trophies. In addition after the war, Korean artisans including potters were kidnapped by Hideyoshi's order to cultivate Japan's arts and culture. The abducted Korean potters played important roles to be a major factor in establishing new types of pottery such as Satsuma, Arita, and Hagi ware. This would soon cause tension between the two countries, with Koreans feeling that a part of their culture was stolen by Japan during this time.

== Effect of Japanese rule in Korea ==
Korea was ruled by the Japanese Empire from 1910 to 1945. Japan's involvement began with the 1876 Treaty of Ganghwa during the Joseon Dynasty of Korea and increased over the following decades with the Gapsin Coup (1882), the First Sino-Japanese War (1894–95), the assassination of Empress Myeongseong at the hands of Japanese agents in 1895, the establishment of the Korean Empire (1897), the Russo-Japanese War (1904–05), the Taft–Katsura Agreement (1905), culminating with the 1905 Eulsa Treaty, removing Korean autonomous diplomatic rights, and the 1910 Annexation Treaty (both of which were eventually declared null and void by the Treaty on Basic Relations between Japan and the Republic of Korea in 1965).

=== Japan's cultural assimilation policies ===
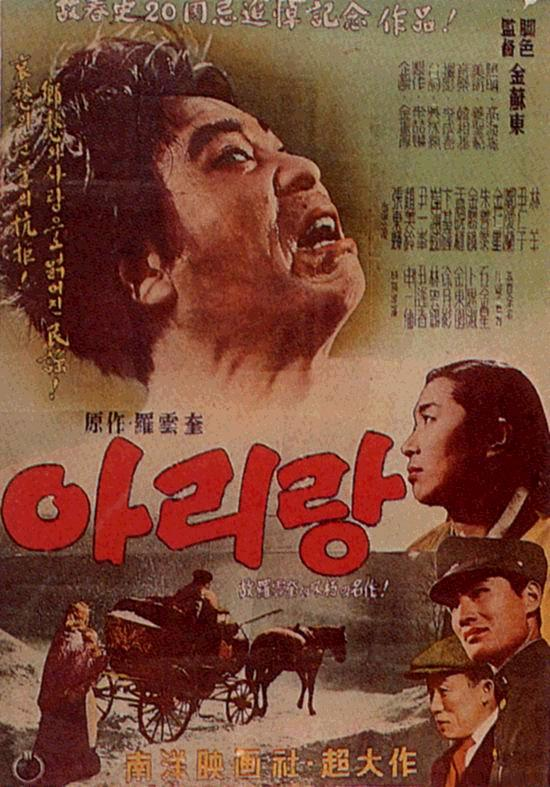
Movie poster of Arirang (1957). The original movie was produced in 1926 by the Korean film director Na Woon-gyu.

The Japanese annexation of Korea has been mentioned as the case in point of "cultural genocide" by Yuji Ishida, an expert on genocide studies at the University of Tokyo. The Japanese government put into practice the suppression of Korean culture and language in an "attempt to root out all elements of Korean culture from society."

"Focus was heavily and intentionally placed upon the psychological and cultural element in Japan's colonial policy, and the unification strategies adopted in the fields of culture and education were designed to eradicate the individual ethnicity of the Korean race."

"One of the most striking features of Japan's occupation of Korea is the absence of an awareness of Korea as a 'colony', and the absence of an awareness of Koreans as a 'separate ethnicity'. As a result, it is difficult to prove whether or not the leaders of Japan aimed for the eradication of the Korean race."

After the annexation of Korea, Japan enforced a cultural assimilation policy. The Korean language was removed from required school subjects in Korea in 1936. Japan imposed the family name system along with civil law (Sōshi-kaimei) and attendance at Shinto shrines. Koreans were formally forbidden to write or speak the Korean language in schools, businesses, or public places. However, many Korean language movies were screened in the Korean peninsula. In addition, Koreans were angry over Japanese alteration and destruction of various Korean monuments including Gyeongbokgung and the revision of documents that portrayed the Japanese in a negative light.

=== Independence movement ===
On March 1, 1919, anti-Japanese rule protests were held all across the country to demand independence. About 2 million Koreans actively participated in what is now known as the March First Movement. A Declaration of Independence, patterned after the American version, was read by teachers and civic leaders in tens of thousands of villages throughout Korea: "Today marks the declaration of Korean independence. There will be peaceful demonstrations all over Korea. If our meetings are orderly and peaceful, we shall receive the help of President Wilson and the great powers at Versailles, and Korea will be a free nation." Japan repressed the independence movement through military power. In one well attested incident, villagers were herded into the local church which was then set on fire. The official Japanese count of casualties include 553 killed, 1,409 injured, and 12,522 arrested, but the Korean estimates are much higher: over 7,500 killed, about 15,000 injured, and 45,000 arrested.

=== Comfort women ===
Many Korean women were kidnapped and coerced by the Japanese authorities into military sex slavery, euphemistically called "comfort women" (위안부, wianbu). Some Japanese historians, such as Yoshiaki Yoshimi, using the diaries and testimonies of military officials as well as official documents from Japan and archives of the Tokyo tribunal, have argued that the Imperial Japanese military was either directly or indirectly involved in coercing, deceiving, luring, and sometimes kidnapping young women throughout Japan's Asian colonies and occupied territories. In the case of recruiting Japanese comfort women (일본군위안소 종업부 등 모집에 관한건) (1938.3.4), the Ministry of Army records that the method of recruiting military "Japanese Military Sexual Slavery" in Japan was "similar to kidnapping" and was often misunderstood by the police as kidnappers.

== Contemporary issues ==
According to Robert E. Kelly, a professor at Pusan National University, anti-Japanese racism in South Korea stems not just from Imperial Japanese atrocities during the colonial era, but from the Korean Peninsula's division. As most Koreans, north and south are racial nationalists, most South Koreans feel a kinship and racial solidarity with North Korea as a result. Due to this perceived racial kinship, it is considered bad form for a South Korean to hate North Korea, to run the risk of being called a race traitor. As a result, Kelly says, South Koreans take out the anger rising from Korean division against Japan. This view is supported by another professor, Brian Reynolds Myers of Dongseo University.

=== Japanese textbook revisionism ===
Anti-Japanese sentiment is also due to various Japanese textbook controversies. On June 26, 1982, the textbook screening process in Japan came under scrutiny when the media of Japan and its neighboring countries gave extensive coverage to changes required by the Minister of Education. Experts from the ministry sought to soften textbook references to Japanese aggression before and during World War II. The Japanese invasion of China in 1937, for example, was modified to "advance". Passages describing the fall of Nanjing justified the Japanese atrocities by describing the acts as a result of Chinese provocations. Pressure from China successfully led the Ministry of Education to adopt a new authorization criterion – the "Neighboring Country Clause" (近隣諸国条項) – stating: "textbooks ought to show understanding and seek international harmony in their treatment of modern and contemporary historical events involving neighboring Asian countries."

In 2006, Japanese textbooks stated that the Liancourt Rocks are Japanese territory. These islands are disputed territory claimed by both Japan and South Korea, who claimed sovereignty over them in 1952. The head of the South Korean Ministry of Education, Kim Shin-il, sent a letter of protest to Bunmei Ibuki, the Minister of Education, on May 9, 2007. In a speech marking the 88th anniversary of the March 1 Independence Movement, South Korean President Roh Moo-hyun called for Japan to correct their school textbooks on controversial topics ranging from "inhumane rape of comfort women" to "the Korean ownership of the Liancourt Rocks".

== Effects of sentiments ==
=== Society ===
A 2000 CNN ASIANOW article described popularity of Japanese culture among younger South Koreans as "unsettling" for older South Koreans who remember the occupation by the Japanese.

In South Korea, collaborators to the Japanese occupation government, called chinilpa, are generally recognized as national traitors. The South Korean National Assembly passed the special law to redeem pro-Japanese collaborators' property on December 8, 2005, and the law was enacted on December 29, 2005. In 2006, the National Assembly of South Korea formed a Committee for the Inspection of Property of Japan Collaborators. The aim was to reclaim property inappropriately gained by cooperation with the Japanese government during colonialization. The project was expected to satisfy Koreans' demands that property acquired by collaborators under the Japanese colonial authorities be returned. Under such conditions, one who has pro-Japanese sentiment seems to try to hide it. According to an anonymous survey done by the BBC in March 2010, 64% of South Koreans are actually supportive of Japan.

While some South Koreans expressed hope that former Japanese Prime Minister Yukio Hatoyama would handle Japanese-South Korean relations in a more agreeable fashion than previous conservative administrations, a small group of protesters in Seoul held an anti-Japanese rally on October 8, 2009, prior to his arrival. The protests called for Japanese apologies for World War II incidents and included destruction of a Japanese flag.

The former United States ambassador to South Korea, Harry B. Harris Jr., who is of Japanese descent, has been criticized in the South Korean media for having a moustache, which his detractors say resembles those of the several leaders of the Empire of Japan. A CNN article written by Joshua Berlinger suggested that given Harris's ancestry, the criticism of his mustache may be due to racism.

In August 2019, Seoul, the capital of South Korea, had planned to install more than 1,000 anti-Japan banners across the city in a move to support the country's ongoing boycott against Japanese products. The banners featured the word "NO", in Korean, with the red circle of the Japanese flag representing the "O". The banners also contained the phrases "I won't go to Japan" and "I won't buy Japanese products". However, after 50 banners were installed, the city had to reverse course and apologize amid public criticism that the campaign would further strain the relationship between South Korea and Japan.

=== National relations ===
Yasuhiro Nakasone discontinued visits to Yasukuni Shrine due to the People's Republic of China's requests in 1986. However, former Japanese Prime Minister Junichiro Koizumi resumed visits to Yasukuni Shrine on August 13, 2001. He visited the shrine six times as Prime Minister, stating that he was "paying homage to the servicemen who died for defense of Japan." These visits drew strong condemnation and protests from Japan's neighbors, mainly China. As a result, China and South Korea refused to meet with Koizumi, and there were no mutual visits between Chinese and Japanese leaders after October 2001 and between South Korean and Japanese leaders after June 2005. Former President of South Korea Roh Moo-hyun suspended all summit talks between South Korea and Japan.

=== Education ===
A large number of anti-Japanese images made by school children from Gyeyang Middle School, many of which depicting acts of violence against Japan, were displayed in Gyulhyeon station as part of a school art project. A number of the drawings depict the Japanese flag being burned, bombed, and stepped on, in others the Japanese islands are getting bombed and destroyed by a volcano from Korea. One depicts the Japanese anime/manga character Sailor Moon holding up the South Korean flag with a quote bubble saying roughly "Dokdo is Korean land".

According to a survey conducted by Korean Immigrant Workers Human Rights Center in 2006, 34.1% of the primary school students in the Incheon region answered that "Japanese should be expelled from Korea". This rate was considerably higher compared to answers to the same question regarding Chinese (8.7%), Black African (8.7%), East Asian (5.0%), Black American (4.3%), and White American (2.3%) immigrants.

== See also ==
- History of Japan–Korea relations
- Japanese people in North Korea
- Japanese people in South Korea
- Japan–Korea disputes
- Japan–North Korea relations
- Japan–South Korea relations
- Anti-imperialism in South Korea
- Censorship of Japanese media in South Korea
- Liberalism in South Korea
- Racism in North Korea
- Racism in South Korea
