= Refugees on Jeju Island =

Refugees who fled the Yemeni Civil War

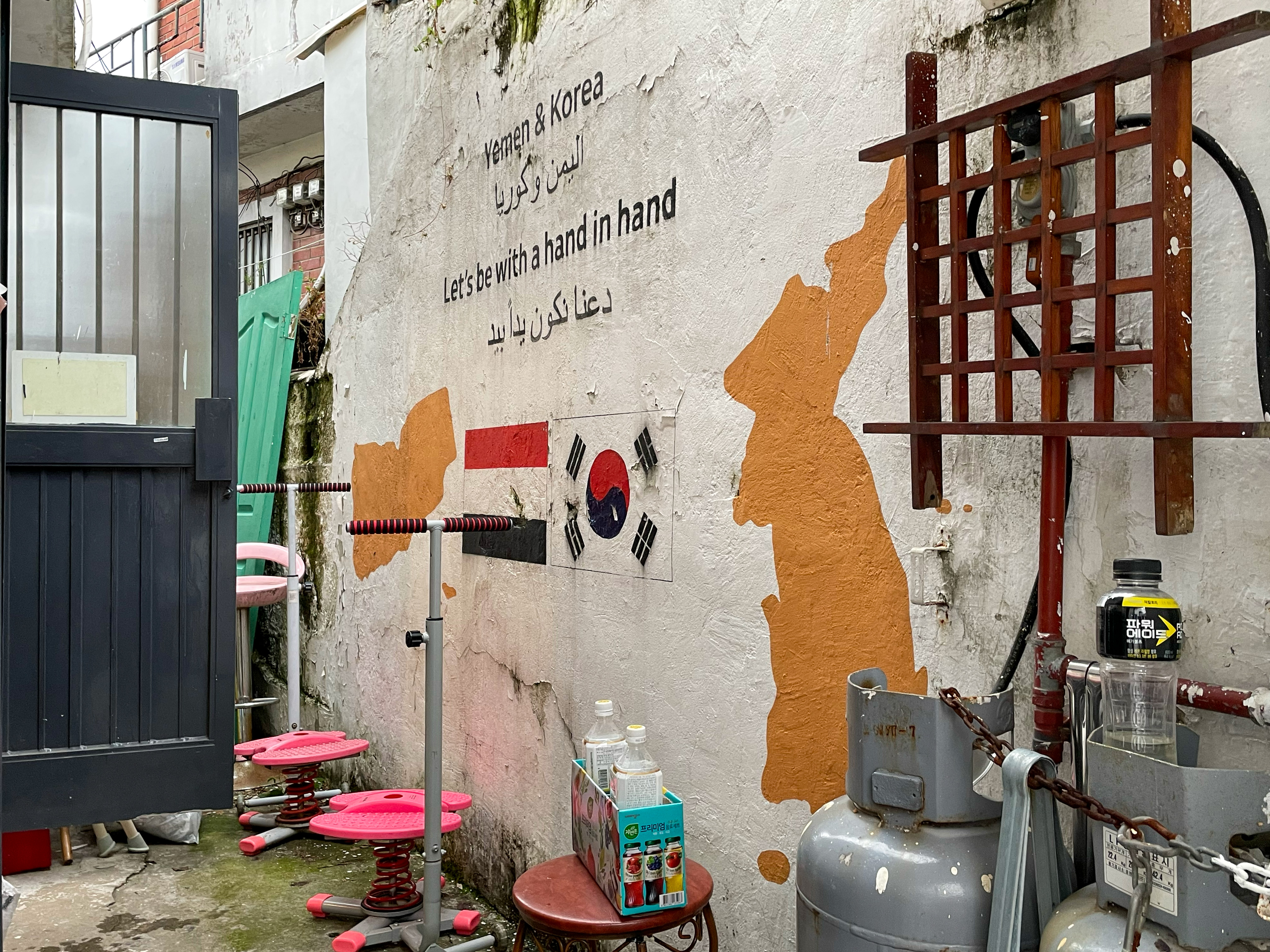
'Yemen & Korea Let's be with a hand in hand' street art in Itaewon

The Refugees on Jeju Island (Korean: 제주 예멘 난민) are less than 552 Yemenis, mostly men, who traveled to South Korea as tourists, then claimed asylum on Jeju Island throughout 2016 to 2018. They are staying on the island under refugee status determination, which led to controversy in South Korea.

== Background ==
The number of refugees fleeing the civil war in Yemen and seeking shelter on Jeju Island through its visa-waiver program rapidly increased in the year 2018. No Yemenis requested refugee status on Jeju in the first year of the war, only seven did so in 2016, and only 42 did so in 2017, but in 2018, the number of applications rose to about 500. As of May 2018, 942 foreigners requested refugee status in Jeju and 515 are Yemenis according to the Jeju Immigration Office. Worries about security increased within the island in response to the spike, with numerous accusations of Yemenis committing crimes adding to the hostile reception of the asylum seekers. Reflecting the negative public sentiment, a petition was posted on the Blue House website requesting the expulsion of the Yemeni refugees. The Jeju Refugee office was not ready for such an increase in refugees as they only had one Arabic interpreter and only one refugee officer.

=== Jeju's visa-waiver program ===
Many of the Yemeni refugees fled to Malaysia first, because Malaysia allows a three-month stay visa-free. Of the few countries which do not require visas for Yemenis, Malaysia was favored as the initial destination, mostly due to the cultural similarities deriving from sharing a common Islamic religious tradition. However, Malaysia is not a signatory of the 1951 United Nations Refugee Convention, and therefore avoids the legal obligation to protect the rights of the displaced. As Malaysia prohibited the Yemenis from staying longer, they moved to Jeju Island through the region's visa-free program. Jeju's visa-waiver program was introduced on May 1, 2002, as a part of Special Act on the Development of Jeju International Cosmopolitan City (제주특별자치도 설치 및 국제자유도시 조성을 위한 특별법) for the purpose of encouraging more tourists into the island.

=== Special Entry arrangements for the Jeju island ===
Special Entry arrangements in Jeju are provided for nationals of all countries not allowed visa-free entry into Korea. The duration is up to 30 days, and the conditions are limited to only those who arrive directly into Jeju Island by flights or ships. In this case, the permitted area or range for the Special Entry is limited to Jeju Island only. In December 2017, budget airline AirAsia began a direct flight from Malaysia to Jeju, which many point to as a contributing factor for increased asylum seekers.

== Action ==
On June 1, 2018, the Korean Immigration Service excluded Yemen from its list of visa waiver countries and imposed restrictions on Yemeni refugees on Jeju Island that would prevent them from leaving for other parts of South Korea. Jeju Island's government assisted Yemeni refugees with finding employment in sectors facing labor shortages. The Korea Immigration Service provided humanitarian assistance and management of refugee applicants while preventing additional Yemeni immigration. The Jeju Provincial Office said that it would do its best to protect Jeju citizens while providing humanitarian aid to Yemen refugees.

More than 700,000 South Koreans signed a petition to the Blue House asking for changes to the immigration policy of South Korea and for the refugees to be removed.

On July 12, 2018, hundreds of South Koreans protested against the presence of Yemeni refugees in Jeju Island.

On August 2, 2018, lawmaker Cho Kyoung-Tae held a conference to discuss the possibility of repealing the refugee law. Cho claimed that no-visa entry policy for any foreigners on Jeju island should be abolished.

Lawmaker Lee Un-ju denounced the refugees on Jeju Island as "fakers seeking jobs and money" and opposes them.

In February 2019, the first Yemeni restaurant on Jeju Island called "Wardah" (meaning 'flower' in Arabic), was opened by a South Korean and a Yemeni refugee who later got married.

== See also ==
- Refugees in South Korea
- Visa policy of South Korea
