= Immigration to South Korea =

South Korea has relatively low immigration rates due to its restrictive policies, though in recent years, with more relaxed laws, the influx of immigrants into South Korea has been rising, with foreign residents accounting for 5.3% of the total population in 2025, putting it ahead of rest of East Asian countries, including China, Japan, and Taiwan. Nevertheless, a number of them are ethnic Koreans with a foreign citizenship. Many residents from China, post-Soviet states, the United States and Japan are, in fact, repatriated ethnic Koreans (labelled "Overseas Koreans") who may meet criteria for expedited acquisition of South Korean citizenship. In 2025, among the 2.73 million foreign citizens who live in South Korea, 848,724 of them are ethnic Koreans and 625,663 are short-term residents. Between 1990 and 2020, South Korea's migrant population has grown 3.9%, the second-highest level of growth in the world. By nationality, Chinese nationals account for 34.4%, Vietnamese nationals 12.5%, United States nationals 6.9%, and Thai nationals 6%.

According to the United Nations, in 2024 foreign born residents represented 3.5% of the total population, which is slightly below the world average of 3.7%.

== History ==
Those who have at least one South Korean parent are automatically granted South Korean nationality from birth, regardless of their decisions on whether to choose the nationality of the foreign parent or the country of birth (if born outside South Korea).

Requirements for General Naturalization include:

- Must have had domicile address in South Korea for more than five consecutive years
- Must be a legal adult according to South Korean Civil Law
- Must have good conduct
- Must have the ability to maintain living on his/her own assets or skills; or is a dependent member of a family so capable. Applicants must have basic knowledge befitting a South Korean national; such as understanding of the Korean language, customs and culture

In 2007 the UN declared South Korea an official receiving country. The number of foreigners in South Korea grew from 390,000 in 1997 to 1 million in 2007. Among these are 630,000 temporary laborers, as well as 100,000 foreigners married to South Korean nationals. Furthermore, there are 230,000 illegal immigrants.

Main sending countries are Asian countries, such as China, Vietnam, Mongolia, the Philippines, Thailand, Nepal, Pakistan. There are also migrants from Nigeria, Ghana, Russia, and the United States.

Nominally, the South Korean government says it wants to create a multicultural society and foreigner-friendly environment.

President Lee Jae-myung has pursued a restrictive immigration approach to protect domestic labor, characterized by a 40% cut to foreign work visas for 2026 and stricter Refugee Act regulations.

=== Issues facing immigrants ===
The number of immigrants in South Korea has increased since 2000, but immigrants have problems adjusting due to various issues. Some issues facing immigrants are low wages, lack of support systems, language barriers, and difficulty gaining citizenship. The Ministry of Justice established the Korea Immigration & Integration Program (KIIP), to help immigrants adjust and integrate into the new society [26]. Another problem Immigrants face is discrimination. Bum Jung Kim and Fernando Torres-Gil made the following assessment, “Unfortunately, despite its economic need for immigrant labor, Korean society has not been able to move past its deeply rooted “pure blood” ideology”. This ideology is firmly ingrained in Korean society, but the need for foreign immigration is undeniable.

In 2018, the arrival of approximately 500 Yemeni asylum seekers on Jeju Island prompted widespread, intense anti-immigrant sentiment, with over 700,000 individuals signing an online petition urging the government to reject their applications and deport them.

=== Visa Options ===
South Korea currently has a variety of long-term visa options for those interested in residing in the country. The S-3 work visa is available to foreigners employed by Korean employers. The D-2 student visa is available to foreigners enrolled in an eligible university. For Korea language program there is D-4 visa category. South Korea also offers a temporary resident visa which allows stays for up to five years, known as the F-4 visa. There is the F-2 visa, which allows residency by marrying a South Korean citizen. The initial permit is issued for three years, then an application for the F5 can be submitted. The F-5 allows permanent residency or long-term status extension. To keep this visa, visits to Korea every two years are required, and the visa needs to be renewed after ten years. Marrying a Korean citizen is a requirement to obtain Korean citizenship. Permanent residency can also be obtained through business investments. The C-2 business visa is available if you start a business in South Korea or invest in an existing business. It can be renewed as a permanent visa. All visas will take two to four weeks to process and have associated fees. E-7-4 is a long-term residency visa that requires residing in the country for four out of the last ten years, a minimum salary of 25 million KRW, and an endorsement by the company of employment. A point system is used during the application process. Higher points are assigned for higher salary, lower age, and higher language proficiency scores. Additional points can be added and/or deducted for various reasons.

=== Initiatives ===
South Korea has projected a 40% decline in domestic university enrollments. Due to this projected decline the Korean Council for University Education (KCEU), implemented new programs to encourage the enrollment of foreign students. These changes have lowered the financial balance requirement for D-2 visas from $20,000 USD to $15,000 USD. The D-4 visas have been reduced from $10,000 to US$7,600. The Ministry for the Korean Immigration Service has relaxed the rules for students who want to reside in South Korea after graduation. The long-term E7-4 visa resident requirement has been reduced from five to four years. The government has also relaxed hiring restrictions for foreign workers. According to ICEF Monitor, “This last point appears to reflect a turn in Korean policy toward a more open immigration policy aimed at attracting greater numbers of skilled foreign graduates. . .”.

=== Issues with current immigrant policies ===
As described in the new national plan for immigration policy, the government claims a "world-class South Korea" welcoming of foreigners. However, Brian Reynolds Myers argues that the government's goals and policies are fundamentally discriminatory, stemming from racist attitudes in the country and ethnic nationalism. In response, the South Korean government introduced new regulations in April 2014, which meant foreign spouses would have to pass a Korean-language proficiency test and earn a minimum wage of $14,000.

==== Temporary workers and illegal immigrants ====
Since 1991 South Korea has experienced a large influx of foreign workers. Approximately 10,000 Asian workers came to South Korea under a newly established trainee program in 1992. In June 1996, there were 57,000 trainees in South Korea. Despite its growth, the trainee program also had problems—namely that the trainees became undocumented workers due to wage differentials, and that they were not protected by the Labor Standard Law as they were not considered laborers.

Since 2004, the South Korean government has followed the "Employment Permit Program" for foreigners, the product of a decade of interaction between Korean citizens and foreign migrant workers. Legally, foreigners are allowed to enter mainly to fulfill low-wage jobs, and they are excluded from receiving social services. Public opinion data shows that Korean citizens retain a discriminatory attitude towards foreign workers.

==== Immigration violations of human rights ====
There are many reports from legal and illegal immigrants who have been jailed in South Korea because of small problems or misunderstanding or overstaying their visas for a long time. Also, there are some reports about beating and abusing the prisoners. South Korean immigration however paid for the deportation ticket and made sure they are integrated in their new homes.

==== Foreign brides and children of multiethnic families ====
Foreign brides and their multicultural children are growing into a major political issue. Sending countries are likely to worry about their immigrants due to deep-rooted discrimination against foreigners in South Korea. Now, most immigration into South Korea comes from Southeast Asia, and immigrant treatment, particularly if there is abuse of foreign brides, is likely to provoke not only domestic problems, but also diplomatic tension. What immigration there has been, is frequently so focused on the birth-rate problem that it is more properly called bride-importing than immigration.

The term "onnurian" (온누리안) refer to a person of mixed heritage, most commonly applied to children of a South Korean father and a Southeast Asian mother. Another term, "Kosian", was coined in 1997 by intercultural families to refer to themselves, but its use spread in the early 2000s as international marriages became increasingly common in rural areas. The term is now considered offensive by some who prefer to identify simply as ethnically Korean.

Number of spouses from western countries settling in the country with South Korean spouses has also been on a consistent rise.

Spouses of South Korean nationals can acquire South Korean citizenship more easily than other foreigners, which encourages thousands of spouses to naturalize every year.

The government of South Korea initiated a discussion whether to establish independent Immigration Office to accommodate fast-growing immigration and to prepare inclusive and rational immigration policies, from 2003, without progress. The Foreigner Policy Committee headed by the South Korean prime minister is responsible for coordinating the country's policies concerning foreigners, which had formerly been handled by multiple ministries. However, its role is limited due to a shortage of resources and manpower. Establishing an Immigration Office is expected to solve these problems by concentrating all the related resources and manpower under one umbrella.

According to the UN Recommendations on Statistics of International Migration (revised in 1998), long-term international immigration is recorded after an individual enters a country and establishes his usual place of residence there for more than a year. Therefore, when the South Korea government builds new policies, immigrant laborers and children of illegal migrants should be counted to follow this guideline.

South Korea is a signatory to the 1951 Convention relating to the Status of Refugees. The South Korean government is the ultimate authority to determine who is eligible to receive refugee status in South Korea.

==== Migrant laborers ====
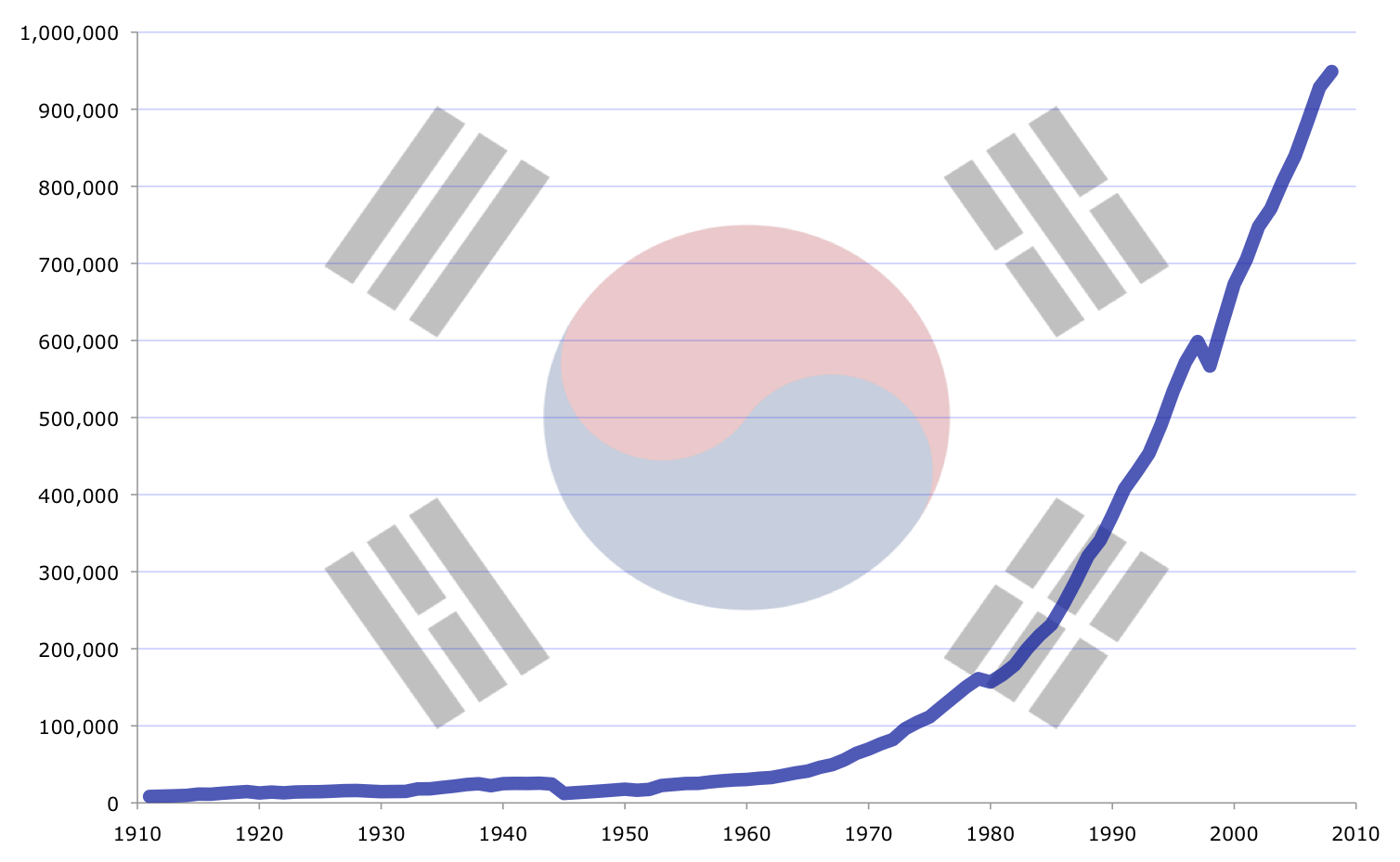
The South Korean economy grew almost non-stop from less than 20k to over a trillion dollars in less than half a century

South Korea used to be a net sender of immigrants until 2007, sending farmers, miners, nurses, and workers to the United States, Germany, and the Middle East. The ethnic Korean diaspora numbers 7.49 million as of 2019, including 2.54 million in the United States and 2.46 million in China.

South Korea experienced government-initiated rapid economic growth from the 1960s on, which has been called the "Miracle on the Han River". Until the end of 1980s, South Korea was able to sustain its growth without foreign laborers because of its abundant young population and low wages. But starting from the 1990s, South Korea's plummeting birth rate and growing cost of labor caused labor shortages especially in the so-called "3D jobs" (for "dirty, dangerous, and difficult"), which translated into demand for foreign labor.

Economic development and urbanization led many people to leave rural areas and move to cites. However, according to traditional Confucian norms which a lot of older South Koreans still adhere to, the eldest son must remain with his parents. Chronic shortages of women arose in rural areas, and international marriages began to fill this unmet demand.

Many migrant workers live in the industrial suburbs of Gyeonggi Province such as Siheung and Ansan, where foreigners account for 7.6% of the population.

== Statistics ==
=== Nationality of foreign nationals ===
There are 2.73 million foreign nationals in South Korea as of June 2025. Among them, 625,663 are short-term residents. These figures exclude foreign-born people who have naturalized and therefore obtained South Korean citizenship; the total number of naturalized South Korean citizens surpassed 200,000 in 2019.

Country	2024	2019
China	958,959	1,101,782
Vietnam	305,936	224,518
Thailand	188,770	209,909
United States	170,251	156,982
Uzbekistan	94,893	75,320
Nepal	74,641	42,781
Indonesia	73,180	48,854
Philippines	70,392	62,398
Russia	69,252	61,427
Japan	65,216	86,196
Cambodia	63,681	47,565
Mongolia	57,093	48,185
Myanmar	53,914	29,294
Kazakhstan	44,549	34,638
Taiwan	35,838	42,767
Sri Lanka	35,792	25,064
Bangladesh	31,220	18,340
Canada	28,604	26,789
Australia	19,430	15,222
Pakistan	18,355	13,990
India	16,851	12,929
Malaysia	12,951	14,790
Hong Kong	12,786	20,018
Others		104,898
Total	2,650,783	2,524,656

==== Ethnic Koreans with foreign citizenship ====
Ethnic Koreans in overseas started immigrating to South Korea in large numbers, especially since the 2000s. They mainly include ethnic Koreans from China and the former Soviet Union, along with Korean Americans. They can apply for F-4 visa which grants them the right to work and live more freely than foreigners of non Korean origin.

Rank	Nationality	Population
1	China	656,142
2	United States	48,837
3	Uzbekistan	43,320
4	Russia	38,369
5	Kazakhstan	22,426
6	Canada	17,923
7	Australia	5,465
8	Kyrgyzstan	4,116
9	New Zealand	2,661
10	Germany	889
11	Japan	873
-	Others	7,703
-	Total	848,724

==== Foreign spouses ====
Number of foreign spouses married to South Korean citizens as of December 2023. This figure excludes those who have naturalized and therefore obtained South Korean citizenship.

Rank	Nationality	Total	Husbands	Wives
1	China	60,048	14,039	46,009
2	Vietnam	39,956	4,475	35,481
3	Japan	15,662	1,325	14,337
4	Philippines	12,557	610	11,947
5	Thailand	8,669	140	8,529
6	United States	5,093	3,484	1,609
7	Cambodia	4,794	788	4,006
8	Uzbekistan	2,792	238	2,554
9	Mongolia	2,583	222	2,361
10	Russia	2,408	167	2,241
11	Taiwan	1,806	186	1,620
12	Canada	1,491	1,171	320
13	United Kingdom	1,344	1,119	225
-	Others	11,196	5,870	5,326
-	Total	174,895	34,526	140,369

== See also ==
- Demographics of South Korea
- Foreigners in Korea
- Refugees in South Korea
- Racism in South Korea
