= National Petition to the Blue House =

E-petition platform

- Native name: 청와대 국민청원
- Romanized name: Cheongwadae gungmincheongwon
- Website type: Government site
- Founded: August 19, 2017
- Dissolved: May 9, 2022
- Successor: Gungminjean
- Headquarters: {{{location_country}}}
- Owner: The Blue House
- Key people: Moon Jae-in; Im Jong-seok

The National Petition to the Blue House, also known as the Online Petition to the Blue House or succinctly as the National Petition (Korean: 국민청원), was a South Korean government website that was created as part of the Moon Jae-in administration's political communication effort to address citizen concerns in South Korea. The website was first released to the public on August 19, 2017, on then-president Moon Jae-in's 100th day in office. The website's goal was to establish a platform of direct communication between the government and the people under the philosophy that "the government will answer when the public asks". The National Petition is composed of a system in which government and Blue House officials respond to every petition recommended by more than 200,000 people over a period of 30 days.

Multiple petitions on the website became topics of interest and coverage for mainstream media after gaining tens of thousands of recommendations from other users. Many of these petitions requested changes in South Korean law or a thorough investigation into previously underdocumented criminal incidents.

The website was dissolved along with the end of Moon's presidential term on May 9, 2022.

== History ==
The online platform was first proposed by Chief Presidential Secretary Im Jong-seok, who believed that just "like the White House... [the presidential office] should also answer the people's petitions." With Moon's approval of the plan, a 'public communication platform' was first established on the Blue House's official website on August 17, 2017, to celebrate the president's 100th day in office on August 19, 2017. A new tab named "People's Communication Plaza" was first introduced, with functions such as discussion rooms, Kookmin Newspaper High School, talent recommendation, and Hyoja-dong Photography Museum. The platform was modeled after the Obama Administration's petitioning website, We the People.

As of 23 February 2018, more than 124,500 postings were posted, averaging 658 daily.

The website was decommissioned by the Blue House on May 9, 2022, at the end of Moon's term as president. The Yoon Suk Yeol administration subsequently created the Gungminjean (Korean: 국민제안; lit. 'National Proposal') as a website to replace the National Petition on June 23, 2022.

== Functions ==
Each petition could be labeled into one of the following 17 categories:

- Political reform (정치개혁)
- Diplomacy/Reunification/Defense (외교/통일/국방)
- Jobs (일자리)
- Future (미래)
- Growth engines (성장동력)
- Rural communities (농산어촌)
- Health and welfare (보건복지)
- Child care/Education (육아/교육)
- Safety/Environment (안전/환경)
- Low fertility rates/Aging measures (저출산/고령화대책)
- Administration (행정)
- Petting animals (반려동물)
- Transportation/Construction/Territory (교통/건축/국토)
- Economic democratization (경제민주화)
- Human rights/Gender Equality (인권/성평등)
- Culture/Art/Sports/Media (문화/예술/체육/언론)
- Others (기타)

If a petition received more than 200,000 recommendations over 30 days, official answers from government officials, including ministers and senior secretaries, were given within 30 days. In comparison, The White House's We the People answered petitions that had the approval of 100,000 people over 30 days. However, the National Petition did not require a separate subscription unlike We the People.

In May 2018, an analysis of all 160,000 proposed public petitions, which were submitted until April 13, showed that the most mentioned keywords were "baby," "women" and "policy." The most popular label was "Human rights/Gender equality". Yoon Young-chan, senior secretary for public communication, said that "we(the government) had been able to examine specifically where the will of the people was," and added that the government will continue its efforts to improve the quality of people's lives.

== Notable Petitions ==
=== Law and punishment ===
- On May 3, 2017, a petition to amend South Korea's juvenile laws was posted on the website. It became the first petition to obtain an official answer from the Blue House. The petition regarded a middle school group assault case on September 1, in Busan Metropolitan City. The perpetrators of the case were denied criminal punishment, as they were under the age of 14 and were not eligible for criminal punishment by South Korean law. The incident brought public rage, leading to the petition's recommendation from more than 200,000 citizens. On 25 May, Senior Presidential Secretary for Civil Affairs Cho Kuk announced his position through social media and the official account of the presidential office's website, replying that "it is more important to prevent crime, rather than lowering the age limit." Cho, while saying that the public request has a legitimate aspect, further elaborated that "the issue with protection disposal and victim protection will improve if we(the government) concentrated on improving it for two or three years with determination," and promised governmental effort.
- On September 6, 2017, a petition including a request for the abolition of laws that reduced criminal sentences for crimes committed under the influence of alcohol and an opposition to Cho Doo-soon's release from prison was submitted to the website. Cho Doo-soon, a convicted felon who kidnapped and sexually assaulted a 3rd-grade elementary schoolgirl in 2008, was given a reduced sentence to 12 years in prison as he was drunk and judicially feeble-minded during the assault, and was scheduled for release in 2020. The petition demanded a re-sentencing of his case with life imprisonment. The petition became the third petition to receive an official response, which was also from Cho Kuk. Cho replied that he deeply sympathized with the public anger, but answered that "a retrial of a case can only be claimed on behalf of the benefit of the convict when clear evidence is found that the convict is found to be innocent or a lesser offense." Cho explained that although any law allowing permanent scrutiny of a convicted criminal was abolished after being ruled unconstitutional, additional management at the national level, such as attaching electronic anklets, could take place. Another petition was made on November 4, which requested that any criminal sentence be prevented from being reduced for involvement under the influence of alcohol. Cho Kuk left another reply, saying that "the sentencing standards for sex crimes committed upon victims under the age of 13 have been strengthened," adding that the Act On Special Cases Concerning The Punishment Of Sexual Crimes has been revised so that no sex criminal will receive a reduced sentence just because the perpetuator was under the influence of alcohol. The petition exceeded its benchmark 200,000 recommendations after 63 days from its initial posting and ultimately received more than 610,000 until its expiration in November 5.
- Similarly, a petition to raise the sentence of underage sexual assault to life became the tenth petition to receive an answer after a case similar to the Cho Doo-soon case took place in Changwon. Justice Minister Park Sang-ki said, "If someone raped a child or a teenager, they can already be punished with life imprisonment under current law." According to the Ministry of Justice, the number of first-term prison terms for sex crimes against children and adolescents increased from 370 in 2009 to 1,304 in 2017 before and after the Cho Doo-soon case, and the proportion of prison sentences to punishment has also increased from 73 percent to 81 percent. He also explained that there were such cases in the past, but that the punishment should not be commuted in cases where people committed sexual crimes under the influence of alcohol. Park also pleaded that the public "trust the government and report the damage" if anyone has been subjected to sexual offense.
- The answer to the No.9 petition is about 'feminism in Primary and Secondary high school education mandatory'. Yoon Yeong-chan, senior presidential secretary for public communication in charge of the answer, said, "Although the textbooks are supposed to include gender equality, they lack quantitative and quality, and there is no explicit gender equality," stressing that the breakdown of the situation should precede how real education is conducted and what the school's human rights index is. On whether or not the regular curriculum of integrated human rights education will be included, he said, "We need to conduct various studies on what content to include." "First of all, we will use the Office of Education's budget of 1.2 billion won to develop learning materials. Also, the Ministry of Gender Equality and Family and the Office of Education will work together to provide education for adult rights. We can't solve a lot of things in one second, but I want you to know that the government is looking for a step-by-step change," he said.
  - Three responses were answered in a combination of similar personalities: the request for active protection from countries without distinction between men and women; the ban on hidden spy cameras; and the petition for the forced use of nude photos by Yang Ye-won. Police Commissioner Lee Chul-sung and Gender Equality and Family Minister Chung Hyun-baek jointly responded to the petition that more than 400,000 people ask for the protection of a nation unrelated to gender, saying, "I feel a great responsibility as a police chief," adding, "We will make extra efforts to correct the unfairness felt by women." Regarding Yang Ye-won, he also promised swift and stern handling, and said he will push to strengthen the education of police officers to prevent any secondary damage. "The government will work harder until the day comes when women feel safe and do not feel discriminated against by gender," Chung Hyun-baek said, noting that the law is being revised to root out digital sex crimes.
- 33rd and 34th petition answer, petition to save children who are being sexually harassed and petition to prevent gang violence. Min Kap-ryong, deputy chief of the National Police Agency, was in charge of the answer. In the 33rd petition, the problem was a video clip showing a man having continuous sex with his seven-year-old daughter. Min Kap-ryong said the video was a pornographic piece produced, and promised a swift investigation, although it is difficult to relate to sexual abuse of children. He apologized for the delay in the police investigation and the lack of support for the investigation as the site where the video was uploaded has a server in the U.S. In the 34th petition, a man was hit by a group of eight people in Gwangju, putting him on the verge of blindness, a case in which police were criticized for their passive response. Min Gap-ryong promised to "do his best to ease public anxiety" by setting up an all-out response system and strengthening the role of the 112 general situation room as a control tower to enhance police's on-site response.
- The 47th and 48th answers were answered by Deputy Prime Minister for Social Affairs Kim Sang-gon, who tied a petition to toughen punishment for underage sexual offenders and repeal of the "Children Act." Regarding the "Children Act," he said that the criteria for 14 years of age, which were created in 1953, were discussed at the pan-government level to lower them to 13 years of age. Related to the sexual assault case among middle school girls, he also introduced related "proposed bills are under legislative discussion at the National Assembly," but said that since juvenile crimes are not resolved only by toughening punishment, efforts should also be made to prevent juvenile crimes and educate juvenile offenders, even if it takes time.
- The 49th answer is a petition on child abuse, which was answered by Um Kyu-sook, a secretary for women's families. Eom Kyu-sook said the legal system has been supplemented to strengthen punishment since the "special law on punishment of child abuse crimes" was enacted, adding that the system needs to be supplemented to the issue of "the fact that various circumstances are taken into account during the sentencing process and that the sentence is mitigated."
- The 50th answer was a demand for a special investigation into the digital sex crime industry, with National Police Agency Commissioner Min Kap-ryong as the answer. Min Kap-ryong said, "We have already set up a special investigation team at the National Police Agency and a corresponding organization at front-line police stations to actively take measures to prevent such crimes and report their victims," adding, "We are also cooperating with the National Tax Service to recover the profits from crimes." He also said that the changed atmosphere is also detected, with midnight functions working and alerting people to digital sex crimes, such as shutting down adult bulletin boards on Internet websites.
- Answer No. 57. The answer is to a petition that he could not be punished properly for insisting on a mental and physical medicine for the perpetrator in connection with the murder of an apartment in Gangseo-gu, where ex-husband murdered his divorced wife. Gender Equality and Family Minister Jin Sun-mi said, "We will come up with measures for domestic violence, acknowledging the lack of measures to protect the victims," but declined to give an immediate answer to areas related to mental and physical drugs, saying, "It is up to the judiciary to check and punish criminal cases."

Answer No. 56, 58, 59 and 60. On 11 December 2018, Kim Hyung-yeon, attorney general, answered four petitions together. All of these cases had something in common: the victim had died and the sentence had been lowered as the perpetrator was recognized to be in a state of so-called feeble-minded due to drinking. While answering the question, Kim Hyung-yeon said, "We should not allow punishment just because we were drunk," adding that efforts will continue to tighten standards in the future. He also stressed that there is a low possibility that mental and physical drugs will be recognized as the courts make decisions through stricter judgment.

- It was the 74th time that a petition to severely punish a foster mother who abused a 15-month-old girl to death while she was on foster care was answered. "We will strengthen public intervention," said Um Kyu-sook, secretary for women's families. He also recalled that he had already submitted a bill to the National Assembly on improving employment of domestic workers.
- The 80th answered petition was about assault incident between two high school students.The attacker was sentenced to 8 months of imprisonment, 2 years of probation, and 160 hours of social labor. But victim's mom posted this petition claiming that "Because the assailant's dad and relatives are senior executives, the investigation was crude, and the trial result was weak. Also the appeal case was canceled without notification." As a reply, Jung Hye-seung, said that "It's a misunderstanding that family relation of assailant had affected the result of trial, and the appeal case was opened but the victim's side hadn't showed up on the day, so it was canceled."
- The 81st answered petition is about the case named 'Sexual violence death of Young-Gwang high school girl'. The assailants made the victim to drink 3 bottles of Soju. When she was drunken asleep, they took naked pictures of her and left her in the hotel room. The victim died due to fatal amount of excessive alcohol. Jung Hye-seung, the Head of Digital communication center, replied that "There will be a second trial under the law." and "The maneuver of our society to crimes that sexually assault victims and record them after calculatedly uses drugs and drinks to make them lose consciousness is changing. We offer great condolences to the friends who shouted out their voices and the bereaved.
- Answer 76 was a demand for punishment for skating coach Cho Jae-beom's alleged sexual assault. Yang Hyun-mi, the cultural secretary in charge of answering the question, said, "The government has already announced measures to root out corruption in the sports industry, including (sex) violence, and the NHRC also plans to establish a special investigation team on sports and human rights, while announcing its plan to establish an independent state monitoring system." Also, the sports community is currently having a hard time anticipating the midnight function, and he also said, "Thank you to the players who have once again encouraged me."

=== Social Issues ===
- The second answer came on 26 November. On 30 September, a petition was filed to abolish the abortion crime, calling it a tragedy for all, and more than 200,000 people agreed to give an official answer. Cho Kuk, senior presidential secretary for civil affairs, replied, "The right to life of a fetus is very precious, but there are side effects such as the production of illegal medical practice due to punishment-oriented policies." He stressed that the current legislation is a step that requires social discussion, saying, "All responsibilities are imposed only on women, and no responsibilities are taken on the state or the men." There were also cases in which the Constitutional Court made constitutional decisions on abortion crimes in 2012, but in February 2017, a petition was filed with the Constitutional Court to confirm whether Article 269 and Article 270 of the Criminal Law concerning abortion crimes were unconstitutional. On 11 April 2019, the Constitutional Court ruled that the penal code banning abortion in the early stages of pregnancy and punishing violations was unconstitutional. However, the court ruled that the law should be amended based on the judgment that abortion cannot be allowed in full immediately.
  - The 25th answer is GMO's duty to mark GMOs and a petition to ban the use of school meals, which continues to be a safety issue. There is no production of GMO crops for edible purposes in Korea, and only six types of soybean, corn, canola oil, sugar beet, alfalfa and cotton are allowed to be imported, said Lee Jin-seok, secretary for social policy. The current system requires technology to indicate that GMO products are GMO products only when GMO protein genes are detected, which claimed a complete indication of GMO products when all raw materials are GMO products. Lee Jin-seok, however, said, "There are differences on safety issues, and since the self-sufficiency rate of soybeans and corn is less than 10 percent, there is a possibility of price hikes and trade friction can occur," adding, "We should consider it carefully and comprehensively." On the opinion that GMO food should be excluded from public meals, he said, "It is not actually used as the current standard."
- Answer No.38. The answer to the petition against the opening of the Queer Culture Festival was 38th. "The presidential office cannot approve or ban the program," said Jeong Hye-seung, secretary of New Media. "We will replace the answer by telling the Seoul Metropolitan Government about the current situation." Regarding the participants' clothing and the sale of adult goods, the Seoul Metropolitan Government also said it will deploy police personnel to prepare for various situations, adding that the city "has gone through deliberation and concluded that there is no problem in using the plaza" under a related ordinance.
- The answer No. 42 was answered by Justice Minister Park Sang-ki, asking for the abolition of the permit for refugee applications. Saying that he "severely accepts the people's concerns," Park Sang-ki said he will improve the refugee system by identifying false refugees by strengthening verification of the refugee identity, punishing refugee brokers, and establishing a new culture and refugee tribunal. However, he stressed that it is time for a realistic and reasonable refugee policy to be implemented, saying, "It is difficult to withdraw from the Convention on the Status of Refugees or abolish the Refugee Act in consideration of its international status." Answer No.43. Jung Hye-seung, head of the Digital Communication Center, answered a petition asking for the release of her husband, who was imprisoned in the Philippines, for the 40th time. Chung said the embassy in the Philippines has received a reply saying that the Philippine police will investigate the matter and that he is doing his best by conducting visits to the consulate and providing legal advice.
- Answer No. 45 and No. 46. Choi Jae-kwan, secretary for farming and fishing, replied by tying together two petitions on a ban on eating of dogs and cats. On a petition to exclude dogs from livestock, Choi Jae-kwan said he would consider overhauling related regulations, saying there are aspects that are "not right for the times." Meanwhile, Rep. Pyo Chang-won of the main opposition Minjoo Party of South Korea proposed a revision to the "Animal Protection Law" similar to the petition, which supported its passage. The presidential office Cheong Wa Dae said the discussions are expected to be brisk as related bills have been proposed to the National Assembly, adding that the government will also actively participate in the necessary discussions.

=== News and media ===
- New Media Secretary Chung Hye-seung and Justice Secretary Kim Hyung-yeon responded together to the petition for the closure of Ilbe Storehouse, an Internet site that shares false information and defies the reputation of individuals, and the petition calling for punishment of Yoon Seo-in, who portrays the victim of the Cho Doo-soon case. As for the Ilbe site, he replied that the closure is possible, but added that procedures are needed to confirm the requirements. "We have to wait and see if the percentage of Ilbe's illegal information postings reaches the criteria for closing the site," said Kim Hye-seung, secretary of the presidential office. As for Yoon Seo-in, he can be punished with libel under the Act on Promotion of Information and Communications Network Utilization and Information Protection after he states that what cartoons he publishes and draws is freedom of speech and freedom of art. However, Cheong Wa Dae said it does not conduct or direct investigation into individual cases and that the victim's intention is the most important. The cartoon was deleted about 10 minutes after it was released amid strong public criticism, and the cartoonist posted an apology to the victims and their families. In addition, " satirical cartoon, problem through a national criticism that ' self-regulation ' operation, which is helped in 10 minutes is meaningful." he added.
- Answer 77 was against the HTTPS prevention policy. The main point of the petition was that the Korea Communications Commission blocked HTTPS to block access to illegal sites, which could result in monitoring and eavesdropping on opinions critical of the government. Lee Hyo-sung, chairman of the KCC, acknowledged that it had never done so in the past, saying, "We lacked efforts to win public sympathy and communicate with each other," and vowed to take all measures to become a transparent and trusted government. However, he stressed that illegal gambling sites and pornographic sites that are currently blocked are subject to the current law, and said, "We will continue to discuss the adequacy of the level of Internet regulation.

=== Diplomatic issues ===
- The answer to No. 26 came in response to a petition from Kim Hye-ae, secretary for climate and environment, for China to lodge a protest against the fine dust issue. Kim Hye-ae said that South Korea, China and Japan have been jointly conducting fine dust research for five years, adding that the results will come next month, stressing that it is still not clear that the cause of fine dust is China. For this reason, it is difficult to apply the violation of international law even if the lawsuit is filed with China," it said. She also said the government is fully aware of the seriousness of the fine dust problem, adding that it is pushing all measures in all directions.

== Criticism ==
Regarding the following side effects and criticism of the petition, New Media Secretary Jung Hye-seung said on 30 May 2018 that it could be possible as a playground for the people. Jung stressed that the principle of "when the people ask, the government answers when the people ask" is "the government's duty of course." However, he said, "We should refrain from requesting a petition for the death penalty, abusive language, slander, false information, and eminence of certain people," and expressed his intention to carefully respond to the issue so that it has more net function than reverse function.

=== Neglect of representative democracy ===
《The Chosun Ilbo》 cited strengthening of online publicity, including the reorganization of the presidential office's homepage and expanding video content such as Facebook, as an example of direct democracy without going through the media. It also criticized the presidential office, which has exclusive rights to information, for distributing news and videos through social media such as its website and Facebook, and for even distributing information directly. It also published critical comments from opposition parties, including Liberty Korea Party spokesman Kang Hyo-sang, People's Party spokesman Kim You-jeong (b. 1969) and Bareun Party chief spokesman Park Jung-ha. The Senior Secretary for Public Communication, Yoon Young-chan sid, "It is not that we will ignore democracy, but that there is a weakness in representative democracy, so we need to communicate directly with the people in the age of one-person media." "The former president's homepage and the homepage of government ministries had all the channels for public discussion and suggestions," he said. "The current government has made it more complementary and sophisticated." "(The press) provides a lot of information, and ... "On the one hand, we have no choice but to create a platform that can unleash the people's direct needs." "In case of major messages or major policies, they will be disclosed to the media first and not to the public first," he said.

Choi Jang-jip, an honorary professor at Korea University, also cited the blue house petition for the people as a side effect of direct democracy. "There are many cases in which people are asking for issues that require deep discussion," Professor Choi said. "There is a risk that (the opinion) will be driven to a cause of excitement to skip the process of calm deliberation." In addition, Choi Chang-ryul, dean of the Graduate School of Education at Yongin University, said, "There is no concern that opinions of certain classes or groups will be excessively reflected," but also said, "It is positive in terms of actively reflecting the people's opinions."

=== Social conflict promotion ===
It is pointed out that the heat of the petition is causing a number of problems. 16 November, came anonymous claims is "Japanese military sexual slavery in the military for soldiers to be almost mandatory military service without pay two years when introduced". This is required "The blue hose to sex trafficking brothel owners to be alive and is not different Japanese military sexual slavery old women against the act.", and that the petitioner's punishment.Nearly 80,000 people joined petition. There are petitions that cannot be made in that the judicial system should be respected, such as a petition urging the dismissal of Shin Kwang-ryol, a senior judge who accepted former Defense Minister Kim Kwan-jin's arrest. As for a petition to make it mandatory for women to serve in the military, a fight petition was filed to transplant artificial palaces to men, turning the national petition site into a "fighting ground." Some argue that the petition should be changed to a real-name system and added a function of protest against the petition. However, the blue house said that it wanted to respect the court's judgment, saying that the court judged the real-name Internet system unconstitutional and that imposing a real-name duty on all citizens to catch the few malicious comments was to treat all citizens as potential criminals. "So far, the self-purification function is working well," he said. "If we add the function of 'I' we can turn the petition board into a discussion board."

=== Excessive expression of opinion ===
Some of the more than 50,000 petitions are said to be unnecessary. They also ask for policy and institutional suggestions such as "improving English education," "revision of the law on child leave," and "abandoning the Korean age," as well as civil complaints such as where to appeal to job scams, to ask for support for dating, to re-hire Guus Hiddink as the national football coach, or to wrap up Chinese chili powder. They say that there are many practically impossible petitions for the government to come forward directly, with fan clubs supporting idol stars becoming a battleground when they criticize or complain of unfairness and petition to dissolve the main opposition Minjoo Party in response to the main opposition Liberty Korea Party's request for the disbandment of the unconstitutional party. There is a petition asking for student human rights and the right to warm up students, a petition to guarantee girls the right to wear school uniform pants, a petition to the president not to take pictures with pretty female entertainers, and a petition to educate people around the world free of Korean for free, and a Cheong Wa Dae official pointed out that the petition has degenerated into a playground, saying, "I understand that, but the president is not the king of Joseon era." Moon Jae-in president also said "Under the current legislation, acceptance is impossible to annoying sometimes.". "But I think it's a very desirable phenomenon," he said. "I think we need a place for the people to express their opinions. Any petition that we can't resolve right now will serve as a guide to improving legislation in the long run." Cheong Wa Dae also announced that it will make efforts to revive the purpose of direct democracy, supplement its counter-function and boost its net function. Academics also assessed that it has a "symbolic meaning," with Hwang Sang-min, a psychology professor at Yonsei University, stressing that the most important thing is to be given an opportunity to talk to citizens. Meanwhile, Lee Taek-kwang, a sociology professor at Kyung Hee University, said, "It is a matter for Cheong Wa Dae to ponder in the future as to how the petition will be raised and how it will be implemented into a democracy of hangover."

However, some argue that the National Assembly's petition system, another channel for petitioning, is nominal. In fact, the number of petitions in the 16th National Assembly, which opened in 2000, has decreased from 765 to 227 in the 19th National Assembly, which opened in 2012. The number of petitions adopted is also small, meaning only two were adopted by the 19th National Assembly because the petition is not properly reviewed by the subcommittee of the petition screening committee within the standing committee even if it is received. Also, unlike Cheong Wa Dae, it is cumbersome that a parliamentary petition should be accompanied by a letter of recommendation from lawmakers.

=== Controversy over overlapping petitions ===
There is controversy over overlapping voting through Kakao Talk. The presidential office Cheong Wa Dae's public petition, along with Facebook and Twitter and Telegram, can participate through four different social networks, including Kakao Talk, which was registered on 6 Jan. by repeatedly cutting off its connection to the "Korea's presidential office" account in the setup menu and then re-connecting it, is suspected that it did not vote for the petition registered on 6 Jan.. The petition is under suspicion for obtaining consent from more than 100,000 people two days before the deadline. In response to the controversy, Cheong Wa Dae blocked the public petition board from pressing its consent on Kakao Talk, leaving a message on its bulletin board, "We have found inappropriate logins of some users and are temporarily suspending the Kakao Talk connection among social login services." It also said it will continue monitoring in the future. Controversy over the overlapping voting has been around in the past, with some community-focused postings encouraging overlapping participation, such as "I have agreed with 12 ids" and "When I turn on my personal information protection mode on my phone, I can change my account and participate in it." In addition, some pointed out that because the method of participation in a public petition utilizes four SNS accounts, one can actually agree up to four times and Twitter can create an account indefinitely, which may "have procedural problems" in which certain public opinion is excessively represented.

=== Controversy over deletion of petition ===
The Jeju refugee crisis occurred in June 2018 when some 500 Yemenis applied for refugee status in the Jeju Special Self-Governing Province. As the number of asylum seekers grew more than 12 times in five months at the time, a petition was posted on the Cheong Wa Dae public petition board, claiming that the government should abolish the visa and refuse to accept refugees. However, the petition, which sought the consent of 180,000 people for four days, was deleted late Wednesday, creating another problem. In particular, the issue of transparency and procedural justification of deletion was raised without explaining the reason for deletion. The presidential office Cheong Wa Dae explained two days later that it was too late to respond as many comments were posted in the near future, but it is reported that it is practically difficult to inform all petitions that are deleted. However, the petition against Kim Bo-reum, Park Ji-woo and cartoonist Yoo Seo-in also failed to quell controversy in terms of equity, given that the answer was made even though it amounted to defamation against others.

In July 2018, a petition was deleted to stop selling acetaminophen at convenience stores, and in January, a petition was filed regarding the law on forced conversion, but it was also deleted.
