= South Korean nationality law =

Citizenship Act

National Assembly
- Citation: Act No. 16
- Territorial extent: Republic of Korea (includes South Korea and North Korea)
- Enacted by: Constituent National Assembly
- Enacted: 20 December 1948
- Effective: 20 December 1948
- Administered by: Ministry of Justice

Amended by
- 3 December 1997 (amending the whole law); 18 September 2018 (last amended)
- Status: Amended

- Citizenship Act
- Hangul: 국적법
- Hanja: 國籍法
- RR: Gukjeokbeop
- MR: Kukchŏkpŏp

The South Korean Citizenship Act (Korean: 국적법; Hanja: 國籍法) details the conditions in which an individual is a national of the Republic of Korea (ROK), commonly known as South Korea. Foreign nationals may naturalise after living in the country for at least five years and showing proficiency in the Korean language.

Citizenship of South Korea is granted to qualifying individuals under the South Korean Citizenship Act and its fifteen amendments. Citizenship status reflects the rights, duties, and identity of individuals in relation to the South Korean state.

There are elements of the jus sanguinis principle of citizenship acquisition in South Korean nationality law, as citizenship inheritance is possible for those with a blood relationship to ethnic Koreans. However, the stringency of this standard has been complicated by politics, the effects of globalisation, as well as historical patterns of migration. Maintaining the balance between the supposed homogeneity of South Korean society and the discourse of progress has proven somewhat tenuous. Despite this, the pliability of citizenship policies in recent years seems to indicate a larger trend that welcomes the addition of select foreigners.

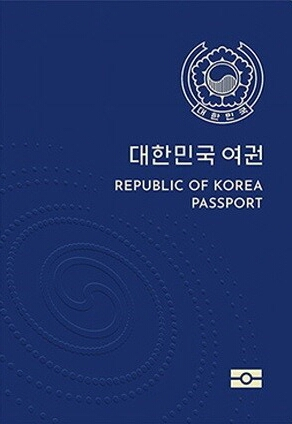
Citizens of South Korea are eligible to acquire a standard South Korean passport. The passport can be used to verify nationality and identity, and is issued by the Ministry of Foreign Affairs.

== Terminology ==
Citizens, or members of the South Korean state, are often referred to through the discourse of kungmin. This term was inherited by Koreans from the Japanese, whose concept of kokumin is a translation of the German staatsvolk. Kokumin is characterized by philosophies of loyalty to the state and its leader as opposed to sovereignty over a state by an ethnic group (as in the German staatsvolk). Because of its etymological roots, there has been a persistent tension between notions of duty and rights for kungmin.

Citizenship (siminkwon) and nationality (kukchok) may be referred to interchangeably in the South Korean context due to a blurriness between these concepts both in legislation and culture.

== History ==
The Joseon kingdom (renamed the Korean Empire in its final years) did not have codified regulations governing Korean nationality. After the kingdom was annexed by the Empire of Japan, all Koreans became Japanese subjects. Colonial authorities did not explicitly extend Japanese nationality law to the Korean Peninsula, preventing Korean subjects from automatically losing Japanese nationality by naturalizing as foreign citizens elsewhere.

=== 1948–1997: Post-Republic of Korea ===
Korea continued to lack formal regulations until 1948, when the United States Army Military Government in Korea enacted temporary measures dealing with nationality as it prepared to establish a South Korean state. Under these measures, a Korean national was defined as any person born to a Korean father. This tradition is based on the principle of jus sanguinis a patre. Children born to a Korean mother only inherited her nationality if the father was stateless or had unknown nationality status. Koreans who had acquired a different nationality were considered to have lost Korean nationality, but could have it restored upon renunciation of their foreign nationality or removal from the Japanese koseki. The first native law regulating nationality was passed by the Constituent National Assembly later that year and largely carried over this framework.

The 1948 law placed particular significance on the nationality of male heads of household. Foreign women who married South Korean men automatically acquired ROK citizenship but the reverse was not true. When foreign men naturalized as South Koreans, their wives and children were concurrently granted citizenship. Foreign women were also unable to naturalize independently of their husbands. Additionally, all naturalized citizens were prohibited from holding high political or military office. These restrictions on public service were repealed in 1963 and major reforms in 1998 decoupled a woman's nationality from that of her husband.

In 1997, the Republic of Korea Nationality Law Amendment extended the qualifications for South Korean citizenship so that any child born to a South Korean parent may acquire South Korean nationality at birth, regardless of the parent's sex. This amendment sought to address the problem of gender inequality in the previous Nationality Law, a concession that the Kim Young-Sam administration planned to reach parity with international standards and bolster transnational relations.

Following the allowance of non-gendered citizenship inheritance from parents, new barriers were put in place in the aim of limiting foreigners’ acquisition of South Korean citizenship. Naturalization through marriage, which was once granted automatically to foreign wives of South Korean men, was given stricter criteria. Through an additional amendment to the Nationality Law in 1997, applicants for naturalization on the basis of marriage to a South Korean citizen would first need to establish residency for two years.

=== 1998–2007: Reactions to expanding citizenship ===
Between 1998 and 2004, there were a series of limitations put on citizenship rights and naturalization in an effort to allay public opinion regarding the many privileges of South Korean citizenship afforded to overseas South Koreans and other foreigners. In 2005, Military Service Law was extended to require service by all male citizens, regardless of whether they were permanent residents in another country. To be released from military obligation, South Korean men were required to renounce their South Korean citizenship. However, many concessions have since been made in service of advancing the economic interests of South Korea. In 2007, legislation was introduced to allow high-skilled foreigners to obtain D-10 visas. Prior to this, foreigners were required to secure employment in South Korea to be deemed eligible for a visa.

=== 2010–2022 ===
In 2010, a new amendment offered South Korean citizenship to talented foreigners, regardless of ethnic background, without the residency requirements for those seeking naturalization through marriage. Similarly, between 2011 and 2016, several amendments were made that would allow South Korean citizens to maintain multiple citizenships–a dispensation which was expressly prohibited in the years prior. Despite the absence of ethnic requirements in recent nationality law amendments, opportunities for flexible citizenship tend to attract affluent and highly educated foreigners and Korean Americans. Those seeking naturalization through marriage tend to be women and ethnic minorities. In this way, eligibility for South Korean citizenship remains fraught along ethnic, gender, and class lines.

Because international standards for human rights directly impact domestic politics, the political practicality of offering citizenship rights to migrants is growing steadily. Advocacy groups representing the interests of undocumented people continue to push for the protection and dignity of migrants under the state. However, this sentiment is not universal as nativism is on the rise in South Korea–this has been attributed to the erosion of citizens' rights in the name of market fundamentalism.

=== 2023–present ===
In 2023, in light of South Korea's aging population and shrinking workforce, the Ministry of Justice announced a proposal to make it easier for children of long-term residents to become naturalized. In the previous year, 14,000 foreigners gained South Korean citizenship. 58% of them had emigrated from China and 30% from Vietnam. A petition against the ministry's proposal gained hundreds of thousands of signatures, and an online hearing was overwhelmed with expletive-laced comments. An opposition party pointed to "unreasonable claims" from some Chinese people that kimchi and hanbok are "also Chinese", comparing this to "cultural fraud" and "invasion".

== Citizenship Act ==
The Constitution of South Korea entrusts the National Assembly with the responsibility of establishing laws which govern citizenship. The Nationality Act of 1948 was the first piece of legislation enacted by the National Assembly which established the boundaries for acquisition of South Korean citizenship. Since its enactment, the Nationality Act has since been amended fifteen times.

=== Act on Immigration and Legal Status of Overseas Koreans of 1999 ===
In 1999, the Act on Immigration and Legal Status of Overseas Koreans officially established the relationship of overseas Koreans (chaeoe tongp’o) to the South Korean State in legal terms. This law virtually granted dual citizenship rights—to work, to stay in the country for a prolonged period, to own property—to certain groups of diasporic Koreans, such as those residing in Japan and Korean Americans.

While this Act appears to indicate an openness to the inclusion of overseas Koreans generally, over fifty percent of this population was initially excluded from receiving the benefits of South Korean citizenship. This was due to criteria in the law which deemed the nationalities of many Korean Chinese and Korean Russians unverifiable. The heritage and identities of those whose ancestors migrated away from Korea prior to the establishment of the South Korean state in 1948 were regarded as particularly precarious.

The provision in the original version of this law which excluded some overseas Koreans was considered controversial both in South Korea and around the world, which resulted in the Constitutional Court ordering the revision of the act in accordance with the “equality principle” of the South Korean Constitution. Of course, even as problematic verbiage in the Overseas Korean Act was discarded in 2004, there remain practical issues associated with this law that continue to limit certain overseas Koreans’ South Korean citizenship rights.

== Acquisition and loss ==
Individuals automatically receive South Korean nationality at birth if at least one parent is a South Korean national, whether they are born within the Republic of Korea or overseas.

Foreign permanent residents over the age of 20 may naturalise as ROK citizens after residing in South Korea for more than five years and demonstrating proficiency in the Korean language. The residency requirement is reduced to three years for individuals with a South Korean parent who were not already ROK citizens, and two years for applicants with South Korean spouses. This is further reduced to one year for applicants who have been married to South Koreans for more than three years. Minor children cannot naturalise independently, but may apply with a foreigner parent who is also naturalising. Successful naturalisation applicants are typically required to renounce their previous nationalities within one year, unless they naturalised through marriage. Individuals who are granted nationality by the Ministry of Justice specifically for their exceptional occupational ability or contributions made to the country are also exempt from this requirement. Exempt individuals must alternatively make a declaration not to exercise their foreign nationality within South Korea.

Naturalisation was exceptionally rare until 2000; the average number of foreigners acquiring citizenship from 1948 until that point was 34 people per year. Since then, this rate has sharply increased. The cumulative number of naturalized citizens reached 100,000 in 2011 and 200,000 in 2019.

Before 1998, ROK citizenship was transferable solely by descent to children of South Korean fathers but not mothers. Individuals who can only trace their South Korean ancestry through the maternal line before this year are not ROK citizens at birth. Persons born to South Korean mothers and foreign national fathers between 13 June 1978 and 13 June 1998 were able to apply for South Korean nationality without any residency requirements until 31 December 2004, which was not be considered as naturalization.

South Koreans residing abroad who voluntarily acquire a foreign nationality automatically have their ROK citizenship revoked and are obligated to report this change of status to the Ministry of Justice. ROK nationals may also lose South Korean nationality when they obtain foreign national status indirectly or involuntarily through marriage, adoption, or legal recognition of parentage. These individuals have a six-month period to make a formal declaration of their intention to retain South Korean nationality.

ROK citizenship can also be relinquished by application to the Ministry of Justice. Female citizens who are also foreign nationals at birth must declare their intention to retain or renounce ROK nationality before age 22. Male citizens who obtained foreign nationality by birth must make this declaration before 31 March of the year they become age 18. Dual nationals who retain South Korean nationality after this point are subject to conscription orders and are not permitted to renounce ROK nationality until they have completed military service. In 2025, there are reported cases of dual U.S. citizens, residing in the U.S., and actually called on for military duty through this principle, as they did not relinquish their Korean citizenship at the time.

Former South Korean citizens may subsequently apply for nationality restoration, subject to the renunciation of their previous nationalities. However, former nationals who reacquire ROK nationality after reaching age 65 with the intention of permanently residing in South Korea are exempt from this requirement.

== Rights and restrictions ==
South Korean citizens are required to register for South Korean identity cards, eligible to hold Republic of Korea passports, and able to vote in all elections on the national and local level. Dual citizens are prohibited from holding any office that requires them to perform official duties of state. All male citizens between the ages of 18 and 35 are required to perform at least two years of military service. When travelling to foreign destinations, South Koreans may enter 192 countries and territories without a visa, as of 2022.

=== North Koreans ===
Virtually all North Korean citizens are considered South Korean citizens by birth, due to the ROK's continuing claims over areas controlled by the Democratic People's Republic of Korea (DPRK). Upon reaching a South Korean diplomatic mission, North Korean defectors are subject to an investigatory review of their background and nationality. If they are found to be ROK citizens, they are entitled to resettlement in South Korea and would receive financial, medical, employment, and educational support as well as other targeted welfare benefits upon arrival. Male citizens from North Korea are exempt from conscription.

However, the South Korean government does not acknowledge the following groups of DPRK citizens as holding ROK nationality: naturalized DPRK citizens who are not ethnically Korean, North Koreans who have voluntarily acquired a foreign nationality, and North Koreans who can only prove their lineage through maternal descent before 1998. Individuals in the first two groups are denied all forms of protection while those in the last category may be resettled in South Korea on a discretionary basis.

According to a 2021 study, "North Koreans have often struggled to acquire state recognition when making claims to citizenship from abroad, and acquisition of ROK citizenship remains an incremental and contingent process, one that requires a high degree of agency from North Koreans seeking resettlement."

=== Overseas Koreans ===
The South Korean government categorizes ROK nationals and ethnic Korean non-nationals living abroad into several groups based on their emigration status and parental domicile. The term "Overseas Koreans" encompasses both South Korean nationals with permanent residence in another country and ethnic Koreans who formerly held ROK nationality and their descendants.

Within the class of South Korean nationals living abroad are "second-generation South Koreans", which are defined in legislation as ROK nationals who settled abroad at a young age or were born overseas, have lived outside of South Korea until age 18, and whose parents are also permanently residing abroad. The "second-generation" term in this context is not tied to immigrant generations and may be used to describe South Korean nationals whose families have been domiciled abroad for many generations. Nationals of this class who have reported their emigration status to the Ministry of Foreign Affairs may indefinitely defer conscription orders, but would be required to fulfill their service obligations upon their permanent return to South Korea.

Former ROK nationals and their descendants have favored status when resident in South Korea. These individuals have facilitated work authorization, access to the state healthcare system, and rights equivalent to citizens in property purchases and financial transactions.

==== Zainichi Koreans in Japan ====
Zainichi Koreans are ethnic Koreans living in Japan who trace their ancestry to migrants who had permanently settled there before the Second World War. When Korea was a Japanese colony, Koreans were considered to be Japanese subjects but this status was revoked by the Treaty of San Francisco in 1952. After normalization of relations between Japan and South Korea in 1965, the Japanese government granted permanent residency to Zainichi ROK nationals. Korean residents who were previously politically aligned with the DPRK switched their allegiance to the ROK so that they could acquire South Korean nationality and subsequently claim Japanese permanent residence. North Korea-aligned residents were later granted permanent residency in 1982. Both groups were reclassified in 1991 as special permanent residents (SPR), which granted the Zainichi near-total protection from deportation (except in the most severe cases of illicit activity) and expanded their employment opportunities. SPR status is specific to this class of individuals with colonial-era origins; more recent South Korean immigrants to Japan cannot apply for this type of residency.

DPRK-affiliated or non-aligned Zainichi do not actively claim ROK nationality and are treated by the Japanese government as if they were stateless, holding a unique Chōsen-seki designation as an alternative. Although they are considered to already possess ROK nationality, their refusal to exercise that status hinders their ability to travel to South Korea. Chōsen-seki may request permission to enter the ROK with certificates of travel that are issued by South Korean diplomatic missions at their discretion, but these have been increasingly difficult to obtain since 2009.

== Controversies ==
Scholars have argued that citizenship is not a fixed status that can be achieved, but rather an ongoing project that changes over time. Because of this tension between notions of stability and fluidity, the concept of citizenship is a site of struggle. South Korea's struggles with recognizing and classifying who should qualify for citizenship reflect both the plasticity of national identities and geographical boundaries. Because exclusivity and exclusion are inherently tied to notions of citizenship, this means that not only are migrants shaped by their reception in a new polity, but citizens too are shaped by determinations of belonging. To this extent, citizens and non-citizens are thought to be formed through a mutually constitutive process in reaction to the policies of the state.

== See also ==
- Constitution of South Korea
- National Assembly (South Korea)
- North Korean nationality law
- Immigration to South Korea
- Foreigners in Korea
- South Korean passport
- Illegal immigration to South Korea
