= Aging of South Korea =

Overview of aging in South Korea

South Korea's population pyramid from 1960 to 2020

Projected population pyramid from 2020 to 2100

In demographic terms, aging refers to an increase in the proportion of senior citizens to the total population. The term "senior citizen" encompasses those aged 65 or older. In 2045, South Korea is projected to become the world's most aged population, surpassing Japan. Senior citizens will reach 46.5 percent of the population in 2067, outnumbering the working-age population.

Aging is often caused by the dramatic improvement of living standards derived from the development of science and medicine, increasing the life expectancy of the average individual; however, a decrease in birth rates can be a major contributor. South Korea's birth rate has declined since 1960, becoming a prominent issue within the country.

Until the 1980s, it was widely believed that the South Korean demographic trend would end and that the population would eventually stabilize, but birth rates continued to decrease. In 2021, this culminated in South Korea experiencing a natural population decline for the first time in its history.

Analysts state that South Korea's current low birth rates are caused by the country's high economic inequality, including the high cost of living, low wages for an OECD member country, lack of job opportunities, as well as rising housing unaffordability.

South Korea's population, fertility rate and net reproduction rate, 2022

South Korea's portion of the elderly population is projected to grow at the fastest pace in the world, from 14.9 percent in 2019 to 46.5 percent in 2067. Consequently, this will lead to South Korea's population declining sharply within the next few decades to about 25–30 million, down from 51 million as of 2022.

View source data.
View source data.

== Causes ==
The main cause of South Korea's aging is low fertility. Decreased fertility rates tend to be caused by lower marriage rates, more delayed marriages, and increased age of parents. Existing research suggests that economic factors such as income, labor market conditions, as well as socio-cultural factors – including changes in the values of education and gender roles, and family and health policy – are the main causes of lower fertility rates.

=== Fertility ===
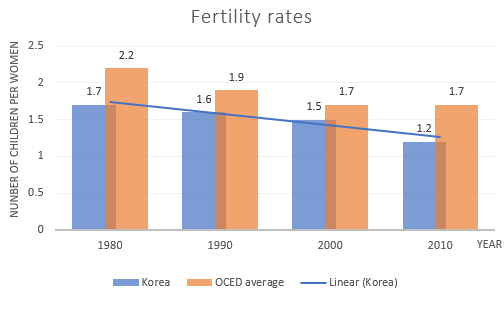
Fertility rates in Korea and the OECD average, 1980 to 2010

The total fertility rate in OECD countries, 2023

Unlike countries in Europe where fertility rates naturally fell below the level of population replacement due to industrialization and socio-cultural factors, Korea's birth rates fell sharply due to birth control policies. Korea's birth control policy began in the 1960s and ended in the mid-1990s when birth rates fell significantly below the level of population replacement. As a result, Korea's fertility rate declined by about half from the end of the 1970s (2.90 births/woman) to 1.56 births/woman at the end of the 1980s. In the 2000s, when low birth rates started to become a problem, the government tried to alter policy to increase it, but the birth rate still declined at a more rapid rate than any other country.

On the other hand, the Korean population tends to have more males than females due to the traditional preference for male babies. Other developed nations with a more balanced sex ratio have had less population degrowth. This suggests that if the South Korean preference for male babies is weakened, balancing the gender ratio, the negative effect on the birth rate may be removed.

The South Korean fertility rate of 1.8 children per woman was below the OECD average fertility rate of 2 children per woman in 1984 and has remained below average since then. In 2018, the total fertility rate in South Korea declined to 0.98. In order to maintain a population of 50 million, the fertility rate would need to match the replacement level of 2.1. Among OECD countries, Korea was the only country whose fertility rate declined below 1.

The number of newborn babies declined 8.6% from 2017 to 2018, becoming the lowest birth rate for South Korea. In 2022, the fertility rate declined further to 0.81. Sejong City is the only area where the population is expected to increase.

Live births, Crude Birth Rate and Total Fertility Rate by Administrative Division as of 2022
Area	Live births	Crude Birth Rate	Total Fertility Rate	Resident Population
Seoul	42,602	4.5	0.59	9,428,372
Busan	14,134	4.3	0.72	3,317,812
Daegu	10,134	4.3	0.76	2,363,691
Incheon	14,464	4.9	0.75	2,967,314
Gwangju	7,446	5.2	0.84	1,431,050
Daejeon	7,667	5.3	0.84	1,446,072
Ulsan	5,399	4.9	0.85	1,110,663
Sejong	3,209	8.5	1.12	383,591
Gyeonggi Province	75,323	5.6	0.84	13,589,432
Gangwon Province	7,278	4.8	0.97	1,536,498
North Chungcheong Province	7,452	4.7	0.87	1,595,058
South Chungcheong Province	10,221	4.8	0.91	2,123,037
North Jeolla Province	7,032	4.0	0.82	1,769,607
South Jeolla Province	7,888	4.3	0.97	1,817,697
North Gyeongsang Province	11,311	4.3	0.93	2,600,492
South Gyeongsang Province	14,017	4.3	0.84	3,280,493
Jeju Province	3,599	5.3	0.92	678,159
South Korea (Total)	249,186	4.9	0.78	51,439,038

Total Fertility Rate (2002–present)
Date	Fertility Rate
2002	1.178
2003	1.191
2004	1.164
2005	1.085
2006	1.132
2007	1.259
2008	1.192
2009	1.149
2010	1.226
2011	1.244
2012	1.297
2013	1.187
2014	1.205
2015	1.239
2016	1.172
2017	1.052
2018	0.977
2019	0.918
2020	0.837
2021	0.808
2022	0.778

=== Causes of fertility decline ===
==== Government policy ====
After the post-World War II baby boom led to a drastic population increase, the South Korean government implemented an anti-natalistic policy in the 1960s. The National Family Planning program created by the Park Chung Hee government was done so as a modernization effort that wanted to transform rural life through social science and international collaboration. Although the program did in fact cause this transformation, historians state that population concerns in Korea developed much earlier than this narrative says it does. Debates about population and social reform predated the Park administration and even the founding of the Republic of Korea itself. Korean scholars and reformers had already been discussing rural transformation and early forms of population control as far back as the early 1930s, so the policies of the 1960s built upon ideas and discussions that had existed for decades. This government program mandated that South Korean healthcare centers provide a family planning consultation by introducing traditional contraception methods, including intrauterine devices, vasectomies, and condoms to the public.

==== Sex preference ====
In the twentieth century, selective abortion of female fetuses had an important impact on the low birth rate. In Korea, there was a strong sex preference for a son because of a focus on the preservation of the family name.

From 1981 to 1988, the sex ratio at birth continued to increase to about 116.55 males to 100 females in the early 1990s. The natural human sex ratio at birth is around 105 males to 100 females, so anything higher indicates sex-selective abortion. Despite sex-selective abortion being illegal, the number of prospective parents aborting female fetuses after checking the sex increased. As a result, in 1988, the government banned doctors from revealing the sex of a fetus to expecting parents.

==== Education cost ====
Koreans prioritize their children's education, which is in alignment with their Confucian values that emphasize the relationship between higher education and socioeconomic status. Some Korean citizens send their children to expensive hagwon, for-profit after-school educational institutes, in the hope that their children achieve the high results required to enter a prestigious university. In 2009, more than 75% of South Korean children attended private academies.

The hagwon curriculum emphasizes English, math, and writing because of the competitiveness of entering the nation's top three universities: Seoul National University, Korea University, and Yonsei University (collectively known as SKY). In Korean society, sending children to hagwon became a social norm to the point that those who cannot afford to send their children to hagwon are regarded by others as irresponsible and ignorant parents.

In 2005, a national survey revealed that 18.2% of women aged 20 to 29 years chose not to have a second child because of the cost of extra education. Parents prefer no more than one or two children to focus on each child's success with the less financial burden. According to a survey by the Health Ministry in 2012, 90% of people who participated in the survey stated that they are reluctant to have children because of high education cost, including private education fees.

==== Society of extreme competition ====
Korea, like other East Asian countries, has a society with much competition and demands on individuals (from an early age at school and later in the workplace). Long working hours and constant social pressure for excellence generate stress and fear of failure among people, especially young people (this may also explain why Korea has one of the highest suicide rates in the world). As a result, many Koreans choose not to have children and sometimes even to remain single. And most married couples wish to have only one child to devote more means and energy to the educational and professional success of that one child.

==== Female labor force ====
As the economy has developed, more South Korean women have entered university, resulting in a growth in the female workforce. More women have postponed marriage and pursued improvement of their standard of living rather than having children. From 1985 to 2007, the average age at which a South Korean woman first married increased from 24.1 years to 28.1 years. Moreover, the female college enrollment rate also increased from 31.3% in 1990 to 83.8% in 2008. As the percent of women working outside the home increased from 42.8% in 1980 to 50.2% in 2005, the birth rate also decreased from 6.0 children per woman in 1960 to 1.13 per woman in 2006.

==== Increased divorce rate ====
The divorce rate increased by 70% from 1970 to 2000 in South Korea. Divorce is the most significant event that affects family dissolution, which results in a low fertility rate. Even though divorce affected birth rate slightly overall from 1970 to 2000, after the economic crisis in 1997, the rapid increase in the divorce rate affected the decrease in the birth rate. This rise in divorce shows social changes in South Korea where ideas about family and marriage had already been shifting for decades before the crisis. Earlier population policies and social pressures encouraged keeping families small and placed new expectations on people, which, over time, made traditional family structures less stable.

In the economic crisis, many families were dissolved as they could not afford to support their family members. The crude divorce rate (divorces per 1,000 population) increased to 2 in 1997 and rose rapidly to 2.5 in the following year. In 2003, the crude divorce rate jumped again to 3.5.

=== Longevity ===
In the first half of the 1950s, life expectancy was only 42 years on average (37 for men, 47 for women). South Korea now has one of the highest life expectancies, ranking 15th in the world. The average baby born in South Korea today can expect to live to 82 years (79 for men and 85 for women). In contrast, the global average is 72 years (70 for men, 74 for women).

The UN projects life expectancy will continue to improve; by 2100, the average baby born in South Korea will live to the age of 92 (89 for men, and 95 for women). A separate study published in The Lancet showed that women in South Korea are projected to be the first in the world to have an average life expectancy above 90 – with the researchers predicting a 57% chance this will happen by 2030.

== Effects ==
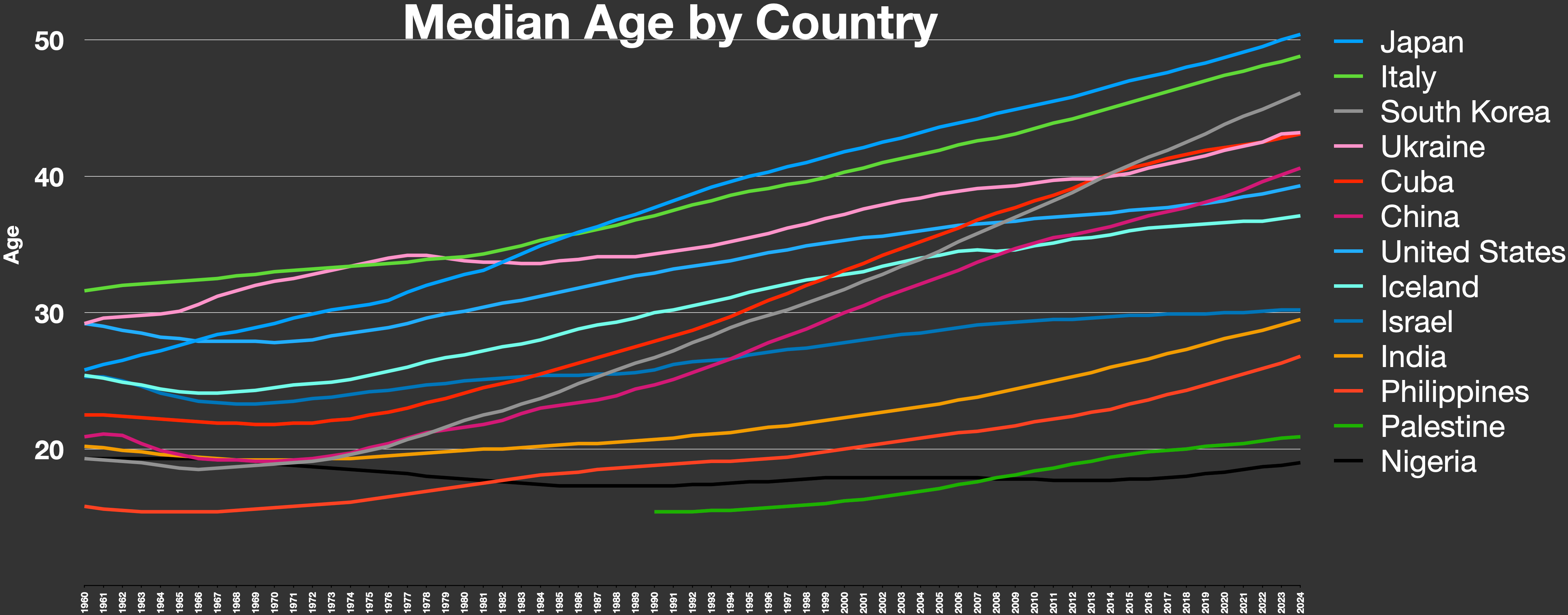
Median age by country

The biggest consequence of South Korea's aging is that the quality of life for the elderly decreases. The main reason for this is that the elderly lack the income to live decent lives. Over 40% of South Koreans aged 65 and above live in poverty, which is the highest rate among the OECD countries. The government has sought to support senior citizens by providing temporary and direct support to those in poverty. There is a limit to how old people can live in a way that contributes to society. It can be said that poverty caused by the exclusion of the elderly from the labor market is difficult to solve, and can only be solved through social respect and support for the elderly.

As the aging population of South Korea is rapidly increasing, one of the major effects of this is that more people will be requiring frequent hospital visits and access to physicians, beds, and other healthcare services (Kang et al., 2023). Not all elderly in South Korea have easy access to these services and hospital/clinic locations. A study which used an “Enhanced Two-Step Floating Catchment Area” method was able to measure the spatial accessibility among the older populations in South Korea (Kang et al., 2023). This study took place in Seoul, Busan, Daegu, Incheon, Gwangju, Daejeon, and Ulsan. Results showed that those who had the greatest accessibility to healthcare services were located in the bigger cities such as Seoul and in fact, areas with the highest elderly population had the lowest accessibility rates to nearby health care services. (Kang et al., 2023).

Possible solutions to this suggest that mobile vans could be a potential way to reach these regions with a high aging population. In the future, the aging population is expected to increase. It is important that South Korea begins to prepare for the future demands of these effects. First, making sure that all elderly has spatial accessibility that deems sufficient within urban locations (Kang et al., 2023). The elderly’s proximity to nearby parks, nature, social services, and healthcare facilities should be increased (Kang et al., 2023).

Chul Chung, President of Korea Economic Research Institute said:

"The declining fertility rate leads to a decline in the workforce and purchasing power and slowing economic growth, which in turn directly affects the sustainability of corporate management, meaning companies need to actively address the issue."

— Chul Chung, President of Korea Economic Research Institute

=== Future population ===
The Ministry of Gender Equality and Family showed that the Korean youth population was 14 million in 1980. However, the youth population decreased significantly to 10.2 million in 2012, constituting 20.4% of the country's total population. This decline of the youth population is caused by the low birth rate and will affect the future population count. In 2013, the Korean government revealed that if the fertility rate continues to decrease, the number of people ages 9 to 24 years old will decline by 50% from 2013 in 2060. Under the low growth scenario, the working age population is projected to drop from 33.48 million people in 2017 to 14.84 million people (44.1% of the total population) in 2067.

This trend will affect South Korea socially and economically in the long term. Because the number of children continues to decrease, school closures continue to increase. If this trend continues, schools will need to be consolidated and rural city administrations will need to be merged to reduce unnecessary personnel and expenditures.

South Korea also has an aging society, which means that there are a greater number of senior citizens with a smaller number of young people to support them. A survey from the Health Ministry in 2012 reported that more than 83% of respondents believe that this aging society will lead to more taxes and a labor shortage.

=== Productive age population ===
While the number of elderly people is increasing, the number of elderly supported by every 100 working-age people is expected to soar from 37.6 in 2019 to 120.2 in 2067, among the highest levels in the world.

=== Economic ===
People have different economic needs and different degrees of contribution to the economy at each stage of their lives. In general, people do not earn income in their childhood, but they do have access to learning activities under the care of their parents. People tend to generate income until they retire; in retirement they depend on money they saved in their working years.

The population decline resulting from a low fertility rate could diminish South Korea's potential economic growth to less than 2% as the labor force declines. This lack of economic growth could affect South Korea's sovereign credit and fiscal strength after 2030. Furthermore, the declining number of children could also affect the Korean Army's military budgets. As the number of eligible young men is decreasing, the government could pressure the armed forces to maintain the current military structure while their budget decreases, as national funds are redirected to the problems of aging and low fertility.

The decline in fertility rates can lead to a positive effect known as "the demographic dividend" under certain circumstances. This outcome can lead to a boost in a country's economic growth by altering its age distribution, resulting in a greater number of working-age individuals and fewer dependent young children and elderly people.

=== Military ===
South Korea's declining birth rate has become a national-security challenge: Fewer young men are around for military service. South Korea's active military will shrink to half a million personnel by 2022, from the current total of about 600,000. The military service, which lasts between 18 and 22 months, is viewed as a rite of passage for South Korean men. But the pool of able-bodied draftees is projected to shrink by nearly half over the next two decades, according to South Korea's Defense Ministry.

== Government policies ==
South Korea's measures to combat aging and its effects include strengthening income security for retirees, finding ways to increase productivity to compensate for the reduction of the working-age population, and taking the leap to an aging-friendly economy.

=== Promotion of pro-natalist policies ===
The Korean government implemented a new policy in 2006 that aims to improve reproductive healthcare services to resolve the low fertility rate. However, this policy had no effect to increase the fertility rate. Therefore, the Committee on Ageing and Future Society (CAFS) was founded in 2003 to increase the fertility rate and to prepare for the problem of an upcoming aging society. The Presidential Committee on Aging Society and Population Policy, which is reinforced by CAFS, announced the First Basic Planning for Low Fertility and Aged Society in 2006. This planning includes support for daycare and preschool education and economic benefits for multi-child families, such as social insurance.

The Korean government announced the pro-natal policies to increase the fertility rate in South Korea on December 2, 2018. The purpose of this policy is to create a positive environment for parents to have more than 2 children by decreasing medical and child-rearing expenses and providing a better support system for working mothers.

Moon Jae-in, the president in South Korea who was elected in 2017, announced that the government will expand a subsidy for parents of young children to triple the proportion of infants and toddlers looked after by publicly run centers. The government expects that before 2022, the number of newborn babies could decrease to less than 300,000 per year, so their goal is to maintain a rate of more than 300,000 newborn babies every year because of the continuous decrease in fertility rate.

The Ministry of Health and Welfare stated that this government's improved plan would increase the standard of living for an entire generation and resolve the problem of low fertility rate in the long term. Starting in 2019, the government promised to provide financial support of medical expenses for infants younger than 1 year. Additionally, the government plans to offer financial support for preschool children by 2025.

The government also increased financial support for married couples who have difficulty conceiving a child. That married couple could be subsidized more than 70% of the medical cost for artificial insemination for a maximum of four sessions. Starting in the second half of 2019, according to the Ministry of Health and Welfare, parents who have children younger than 8 years old can leave work an hour earlier, and paid paternity leave is increased to 10 days.

=== Strengthening income security system stable retirement ===
As the average life expectancy grows older, the problem of poverty may intensify. Accordingly, the 3rd Basic Plan intends to strengthen the public and private retirement income security system. To relieve blind spots in public pensions, the government will expand women's pension entitlements and increase their participation in national pensions such as one-time and part-time special employment.

The plan is to establish a one-person national pension system. The plan is to increase membership by easing the requirements for housing pension and farmland pension. They will improve the financial system in preparation for long-term risks due to the safety assets of the elderly and expand the retirement preparation services so that they can prepare for their own retirement.

=== Expanding conditions that can improve the quality of life of the elderly ===
To improve the quality of life of the elderly, they will expand the conditions to improve the quality of life for the elderly. This includes efforts to create a safe living environment. Specifically, the process includes vitalizing the health mileage system, strengthening chronic disease management, expanding comprehensive nursing care and nursing services, strengthening long-term care insurance system quality management, and reinforcing hospice palliative care services. They will support the health of the elderly by supporting them. The company plans to support active retirement by expanding social participation opportunities such as developing leisure culture tailored to the elderly and expanding participation in volunteer support. They will create a safe living environment by expanding rental housing for the elderly, mandatory safety training for senior drivers, and reducing traffic accidents for elderly pedestrians through the establishment of elderly protection zones.

The combination of South Korea’s rapid aging population and the slowing economy has left many children unable to care for their aging parents. This has left many elderly people in South Korea living alone and supporting themselves with little financial means. Research from 2006 to 2016 showed that elderly people who live with family have overall greater life satisfaction than those who live alone (Roh & Weon, 2022). Those elderly who lived alone reported higher levels of poverty and thoughts of suicide (Roh & Weon, 2022).

The impact that living arrangements have on the elderly were measured by an individual’s overall thoughts and impressions on their health conditions, living conditions, social network, and their overall environment (Roh & Weon, 2022). Researchers named Shin and Sok used a 20-question survey created by Yun which asked elderly participants about their emotions and life experiences. Results found that those living with family members were less likely to consider suicide, develop depression, and experience deteriorating health conditions (Roh & Weon, 2022).

This shows one way the lives of elderly people in South Korean can be improved by living with friends and family instead of by themselves. Not everyone has the means to live with relatives or close friends. In this case, several studies reported that elderly who live alone but who partake in regular physical activity and social relationships have higher overall life satisfaction (Roh & Weon, 2022).

=== Manpower utilization plan compared to the reduction of productive population ===
As the decrease in the number of people available for production began in earnest in 2016, they are devising measures to utilize women, middle-aged and foreign workers. Women's employment will be activated by diversifying the form of work such as part-time work and strengthening the reemployment support system for career-breaking women. Korea will strengthen the working base of middle-aged and older workers by spreading the wage peak system to establish the 60-year-old retirement age system and mandatory life support service. In order to expand the recruitment of overseas talented individuals, especially in areas where there is a shortage of domestic specialists, the government will provide opportunities for long-term employment and settlement, and establish a mid- to long-term immigration policy to utilize foreign workers.

=== Leap to an age-friendly economy ===
As the elderly population grows, active efforts for the aged-friendly industry are needed. Therefore, the 3rd basic plan aims to foster the industrial sectors such as medical care, tourism, and food related to the elderly, and to support the development of universal design and user-oriented elderly-friendly products. Meanwhile, in order to cope with the reduction of school age population due to low birth rate, they will promote university structural reform, teacher training, and reschedule supply and demand plan.

In order to cope with the declining population in rural areas due to aging and urbanization, the government also proposes measures to revitalize return-to-home villages. It plans to reform the national pension system and stabilize the income base of health insurance to manage the financial risk of social insurance. The government will plan to reform special occupational pension plans. For the efficient use of national finance, the government proposes measures to reorganize quasi-duplicate financial projects, expand revenue bases, and manage mid- to long-term financial risks.

== See also ==
- Aging of Japan
- Aging of China
