= Sovereign credit =

Sovereign credit is the credit of a sovereign country backed by the financial resources of that state. Sovereign credit is the opposite of sovereign debt. Fiat money is sovereign credit and sovereign bonds are sovereign debts. When money buys bonds, sovereign credit cancels sovereign debt.

== See also ==
- Sovereignty
- Debt
- Government debt
