= Racism in South Korea =

Racism in South Korea comprises negative attitudes and views on race or ethnicity which are related to each other, are held by various people and groups in South Korea, and have been reflected in discriminatory laws, practices and actions (including violence) at various times in the history of South Korea against racial or ethnic groups. It has been recognized as a widespread social problem in the country. South Korea lacks an anti-discrimination law, which was recommended by the UN Human Rights Committee in 2015. The law has been reported stalled due to "lack of public consensus".

An increase in immigration to South Korea since the 2000s catalyzed more overt expressions of racism, as well as criticism of those expressions. Newspapers have frequently reported on and criticized discrimination against immigrants, in forms such as being paid lower than the minimum wage, having their wages withheld, unsafe work conditions, physical abuse, or general denigration.

In the 2017–2020 World Values Survey, of the 1,245 South Koreans surveyed, 15.2% reported that they would not want someone of a different race as a neighbor. This represents a sharp decrease from the 2010–2014 World Values Survey, where of 1,200 South Koreans surveyed, 34.1% mentioned that they would not want someone of a different race as a neighbor. In the 2010–2014 survey, 44.2% reported they would not want "immigrants/foreign workers" as neighbors. By the 2017–2020 report, this figure was at 22.0%.

According to a survey conducted by the National Human Rights Commission of Korea among foreign residents in South Korea in 2019, 68.4% of respondents declared they had experienced racial discrimination, and many of them said they experienced it due to their Korean language skills (62.3%), because they were not Korean (59.7%), or due to their race (44.7%).

However, in a news article from 2023, Statistics Korea reported that 19.7% of foreign residents in Korea faced racism, mostly due to their nationalities (58.0%) and fluency in Korean (27.9%).

According to a report of the Committee on the Elimination of Racial Discrimination, undocumented migrant children are left without many of the rights enjoyed by their South Korean counterparts. The process used to determine refugees status is designed "not to protect refugees but to keep them out." Migrant workers are only allowed to change their job with their old employer's permission. Migrant workers who work in agricultural sector, small businesses and domestic services are the most vulnerable to discrimination because of the temporary nature of their work.

== History ==
Scholars believe Korea's strong national identity comes from a long tradition of "thousand years of 'pure' ancestral bloodlines, common language, customs, and history" and was strengthened during and after the Japanese colonialism in the 20th century. The Japanese's attempts to erase Korean language, culture and history had constructed ethnocentrism and ethno-nationalism as a method for Koreans to reclaim and maintain their sovereignty.

According to Katharine Moon, the Asian financial crisis in 1997 is one of the events that shaped Korean's dominant attitude towards immigrants and foreigners. In the 1997 crisis, the IMF forced South Korea to take a bailout and the adverse effect it had on Korean's economy caused the closings of financial institutions, losing jobs for 5% of workers and decreased earnings for the majority of the population.

It was also observed that, due to a lack of an anti-discrimination law, incidents occurred where non Korean people were denied services at clubs or in taxis without consequences.

=== Attitudes against different races and groups ===
Overt racist attitudes are more commonly expressed towards immigrants from poorer Asian countries, Latin America, and Africa, while racist attitudes toward immigrants of Western European and Japanese descent are more commonly expressed via subtle racism and microaggressions. Related discrimination has also been reported with regard to mixed-race children, Chinese Korean, and North Korean immigrants.

Muslims also encounter racism and prejudice from a significant segment of Korean society, which is further complicated due to the foreign or immigrant background of many Muslims living in Korea. It was observed that many Koreans perceive Muslims as a potential "terrorist group", with these negative views stemming from the rising prevalence of Islamophobia in Korea and elsewhere in Asia, along with stereotypical representations of Muslims and Islam in Korean media. In 2006, American football player Hines Ward, who was born in Seoul to a South Korean mother and a black American father, became the first South Korean-born American to win the NFL Super Bowl's MVP award. This achievement threw him into the media spotlight in South Korea. When he traveled to South Korea for the first time, he raised unprecedented attention to the acceptance of "mixed-blood" children. He also donated US$1 million to establish the "Hines Ward Helping Hands Foundation", which the media called "a foundation to help mixed-race children like himself in South Korea, where they have suffered discrimination." Hines Ward was granted honorary South Korean citizenship.

=== COVID-19 pandemic ===
During the COVID-19 crisis, 1.4 million foreigners living in South Korea were initially excluded from the government's subsidy plan, which includes relief funds of up to 1 million won to Korean households. Although all people are susceptible to the virus, only foreigners who are married to Korean citizens were eligible for the money because of their "strong ties to the country". Following backlash, financial aid was extended to most foreigners in August that year.

The COVID-19 pandemic in 2020 has made schools in South Korea go fully online but the immigrant and refugee children have not received proper education opportunities due to the lack of appropriate online curriculum for them.

In March 2021, several regions in Korea ordered all foreigners to undergo testing for COVID or risk a fine. This legislation has been criticized by activists for being discriminatory and racist.

==== Vaccine passport controversy ====
South Korea implemented a vaccine passport system during the COVID-19 pandemic, restricting access to high-risk venues such as bars, restaurants, and clubs. Korea's vaccine passport system was criticized as being discriminatory because it did not recognize the vaccinations of foreigners who had been vaccinated overseas unless one has obtained a quarantine exemption, while allowing recognizing overseas vaccinations of Korean nationals with or without a quarantine exemption.

The then British Ambassador to South Korea, Simon Smith, criticized the vaccine passport on the official Twitter account for the British Embassy in Seoul, saying "If evidence produced by a Korean national of an overseas vaccination is good enough for that vaccination to be registered for the vaccine pass, the same evidence should be good enough to register the overseas vaccinations of foreign nationals too." The United States embassy made a public statement saying, "The U.S. Embassy in Seoul is aware of the Korean Government's discriminatory policy which prevents U.S. citizens from registering vaccinations received in the United States with local health centers" and that they were raising their concerns to the highest levels of government to resolve this issue.

On December 6, 2021, the ambassadors from the US, UK, Canada, Australia, New Zealand, India, and the EU Delegation to Korea jointly urged the South Korean government to recognize overseas vaccinations of foreigners. South Korea reversed their policy on December 9, 2021, allowing non-Korean nationals to register their vaccines, which allowed access to the vaccine passport and the third booster shot.

== Legislation ==
Recent legislation – in particular, the Foreign Workers' Employment Act (2004) and Support for Multicultural Families (2008) – have improved the situation of immigrants, more efficiently protecting their human and labor rights. In 2011, the South Korean military abandoned a regulation barring mixed-race men from enlisting, and changed the oath of enlistment to not reference racial purity (minjok) to citizenship. Similarly, related concepts have been withdrawn from school curricula. This has been accredited in part to international pressure – in particular, concern from the UN Committee on the Elimination of Racial Discrimination, which stated persistent ethnic-centric thinking in South Korea "might be an obstacle to the realization of equal treatment and respect for foreigners and people belonging to different races and cultures".

As of September 2021, South Korea was lacking an anti-discrimination law, which has been globally recommended by the UN Human Rights Committee in 2015. It is frequently discussed in South Korean media and by politicians. As a result, incidents have been reported where people were denied service at drinking establishments and clubs because of their ethnicity. Legislations to protect against discrimination has been brought up in 2007, 2010, and 2012. but the bills faced objections chiefly by conservative Protestants. Another attempt has been made in 2020 by a minor liberal Justice Party to "ban all kinds of discrimination based on gender, disability, age, language, country of origin, sexual orientation, physical condition, academic background and any other reason."

According to a survey conducted by the National Human Rights Commission of Korea among foreign residents in South Korea in 2019, 68.4% of respondents declared they had experienced racial discrimination, and many of them said they experienced it due to their Korean language skills (62.3%), because they were not Korean (59.7%), or due to their race (44.7%).

== In education ==
Only 40% of mixed-race elementary and middle school students, or students born out of international marriages are considered Koreans by their classmates. Almost 50% of students said they have difficulties maintaining relationships with students who do not share the same nationality background. The reason given by Korean students is because of their classmates' different skin colors (24.2%), fear of being outcast by other Korean students (16.8%), and feeling of embarrassment if being friends with mixed-race children (15.5%).

In an article published in 2009 in the journal Academic Leadership, Paul Jambor (assistant professor at Korea University) claimed that Korean college students exhibit discrimination towards foreign professors by calling them by their first names and not showing the same amount of respect towards them as students traditionally show towards their Korean professors.

In a news article published in 2007, there were reported cases of discrimination against foreign professors in universities in terms of equipment provision and office space. The article also states that the hourly wages and job security of foreign professors were low. Lack of interculturality has also been reported as an issue, where foreign staff were not introduced to domestic staff, but rather, other foreigners, leading international faculty to describe their jobs to be "extremely lucrative, dead end jobs".

== See also ==
- Anti-Korean sentiment
- Multicultural families in South Korea
- Racism in North Korea
- Refugees in South Korea
