= Flexible citizenship =

Ideology on the reasons people choose their citizenship

Flexible Citizenship is an ideology on citizenship that asserts that economic reasons are the primary reason people choose their citizenship as opposed to identifying with a community based on shared political rights.

== Background ==
Flexible citizenship is a form of citizenship that redefines the traditional citizenship view based on membership of political rights and participation within a nation state. Flexible citizenship is arguably based on that globalization has made economic concerns the major contributing factor in people in ‘choosing’ their citizenship as opposed to citizenship based on an allegiance to country's government. Therefore, people arguably will choose their citizenship based on economic reasons rather than political rights or participation within what nation state they reside.

== History ==
The thought of flexible citizenship has arisen over the past few decades after the Cold War. Due to the growing changes and increasing levels of technology in the world, flexible citizenship has become applicable to many migrants within many states. Globalization has been the primary reason for the development of various new forms of citizenship. Due to Globalization, the access to borders has become increasingly easier for people to move from nation to nation. Also, it has given people the greater opportunity to gain access on information where the greatest accesses to jobs are held. Due to the great migrations and interconnected borders that have arisen from globalization, traditional citizenship has been challenged by various scholars who have brought forth new thoughts of how citizenship should work in the contemporary world. For instance, the Cosmopolitan scholars such as Nussbaum and Appiah and Post-national citizenship theorists have challenged the view of looking towards citizenship as purely based on rights to political participation.

This form of citizenship could arguably be derived from a form of transnational citizenship that is clearly seen in contemporary society. These individuals travel to nations to find employment, but do not have the same the traditional rights (such as political rights) that residents gain in their society. Although most of these migrants lack political rights, they do have some employment rights in countries like the United States.

== Application ==
As it is true that populations of people have been traveling around the world all of history to find greater access to economic gains, it has never been this numerous. Predominantly during the 1980s, there began an increasing trend of populations (predominantly from Taiwan and Hong Kong) to travel around the world to search for work to send money back to their families in their country of origin. Many people from these areas searched for as migration workers in the United States, Canada, Australia, and New Zealand. However, it not just migration workers that use this flexible citizenship for their advantage. Numerous Chinese elites send their children overseas to these countries' universities to gain access to an elite education that will benefit them in country of origin, and could also set up important business connections that could benefit their country of origin. This term of the “astronaut family” has been developed to challenge the traditional view of the nuclear family.

Within in some countries in Europe, contemporary examples of flexible citizenship can be seen. The example of Turkish guest workers in Germany is an example of both transnationalism and flexible citizenship. For instance, after World War II there was a shortage of able-bodied men to work lower position jobs, therefore migrant workers from many countries were recruited to take this position. Primarily, these guest workers came from Turkey to fill these positions. Although there was initially a rule of ‘quick return’ for the migrant workers, the German government realized it was more profitable to keep the migrant workers there, and issued them guest worker permits that let these Turkish guest workers stay indefinitely.

In the United States, examples of flexible citizenship with migrant workers in the Southwest can be found. As stated early, migrant workers in the United States have the rights to information on workers' compensation and a minimum wage. However, many of these migrant workers live below the poverty line and do not receive these wages due to the fear of deportation. The primary argument that most of these migrants have left their country of origin is once again economic concerns, and finding job opportunities in the United States. For instance, there is an abundance of farming jobs in the United States that many United States citizens are unwilling to do. Therefore, many of these migrant workers are granted permit residence as a result.
