= Wardah (restaurant) =

Yemeni restaurant in Jeju City, South Korea

Restaurant information
- Established: November 7, 2018
- Food type: Yemeni cuisine
- Location: 24-1 Gwandeok-ro 8-gil, Jeju City, Jeju Province, South Korea
- Coordinates: 33.5110°N 126.5231°E

Wardah (Korean: 와르다; Arabic: وردة, romanized: warda, lit. 'flower', IPA: [ˈwæɾdæ]) is a Yemeni restaurant in Jeju City, South Korea. It first opened on November 7, 2018. It was reported in 2019 that the restaurant is one of very few halal restaurants in Jeju Province. The restaurant is owned and operated by a couple: South Korean Ha Min-gyeong and Yemeni refugee Mohammad Al-Mamari ("Amin"). The restaurant is named for a nickname given to Ha by the local Yemeni community.

Al-Mamari arrived in South Korea in May 2018, fleeing the Yemeni civil war. Ha became involved in the refugee community after she offered to provide shelter for refugees; she would end up sheltering 100 over the course of a year. Ha decided to open a halal restaurant to help feed the community; it soon reportedly became a local Muslim community center. The two were married in April 2019.

The restaurant serves Yemeni cuisine as well as other Arab cuisine dishes. Yemenis were reportedly allowed to eat at half price. The restaurant has reportedly become popular amongst Korean locals and tourists as well.
