= Refugees in South Korea =

South Korea joined the Convention Relating to the Status of Refugees in 1992 and became the first country in East Asia to enact its own refugee law in 2012. According to the ministry of justice in South Korea, there have been 12,208 asylum applicants since 1992 and it has accepted 522 (4.2% of the total applicants) as refugees. The UNHCR categorized 44 industrialized countries in the world as refugees receiving countries. South Korea is one of the receiving countries in Asia-Pacific, including Japan. The number of asylum applications in 2013 increased by 85%; however, according to the Ministry of Justice in South Korea, the acceptance rate of refugees was 7.3% at the end of 2014. UNHCR said among the Parties relating to the Status of Refugees, 38% of asylum seekers were accepted as refugees, which is Korea's acceptance is much lower than international standards. The top three nationalities of people accepted as a refugee are Myanmar (154), Bangladesh (84), and Ethiopia (73). Refugees from Myanmar were accepted because of political reasons but the number of refugees has decreased as the political situation in Myanmar has improved. Approximately 1,000 Syrian nationals came into South Korea between 2014 and 2016 and most were granted humanitarian visas.

The process of application for asylum is very complicated in South Korea. Asylum seekers in South Korea are not allowed to get a job for the first 6 months, which prevent illegal stay for getting a job. They are not in the public health insurance system, as well. The Korean government provides support for living expenses to asylum seekers, but for only 7% of them because of a lack of budget. It takes over a year to be categorised as a refugee. The asylum seekers have to be permitted to extend their residence for every 6 months, a year for people who are staying under humanitarian grounds. However, it is hard to be performed precisely because there is not enough human resources for status determination.

In 2018, 500 refugees fleeing the civil war in Yemen came to Jeju Island, causing unease among some of the residents of Jeju Island. Among many activist groups and celebrities, Jung Woo-sung raised attention to the situation of the refugees and reaffirmed his support for them.

== See also ==
- Immigration to South Korea
- North Korean defectors
- Refugees on Jeju Island
