= Immigration policy of South Korea =

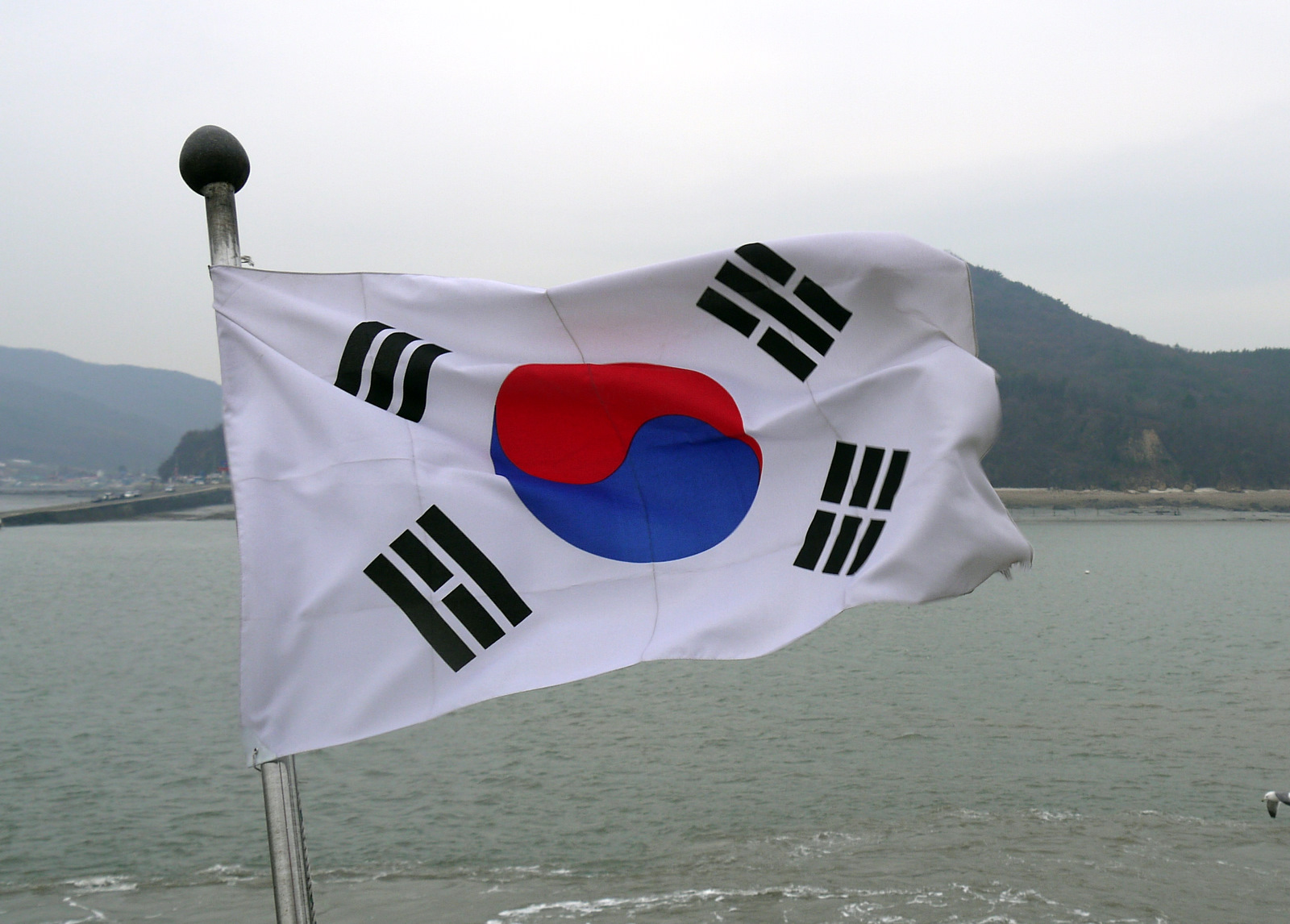

In South Korea, immigration policy is handled by the immigration services of the Ministry of Justice, Ministry of Labor, Ministry of Health and Welfare and the Ministry of Foreign Affairs and Trade. The Nationality Act, Immigration Control Act, Multicultural Families Support Act, and the Framework Act on Treatment of Foreigners are the foundations of immigration policy in Korea. The Korean government initiated a discussion in 2003 on establishing an independent immigration office to accommodate fast-growing immigrant and to prepare inclusive and rational immigration policies; however, there has been little progress. The Foreigner Policy Committee, headed by the Prime Minister, coordinates foreigner-related policies which were handled by many ministries. However, its role is limited because of a shortage of resources and manpower. The establishment of an Immigration Office is expected to solve these problems by concentrating all related resources and manpower under one umbrella.

== History ==
=== Korea as a sending country ===
Korea was a sending country which sent farmers, miners, nurses and laborers to the United States, Germany and the Middle East. The Korean diaspora around the world consisted of 6.82 million people, as of 2009; there were 2.34 million Koreans in China and 2.1 million Korean Americans. The total Korean diaspora (which reached over seven million in 2007) declined by 0.22 million in 2009.

=== Korea as a receiving country ===
After the 1988 Seoul Olympics, Korea opened its border to the general public, which resulted in increased exchanges with foreign countries. The United Nations declared Korea an official receiving country in 2007, and the number of foreigners in Korea grew from 390,000 in 1997 to 1,000,000 in 2007. Among these, temporary laborers were 630,000 and foreigners who married Korean nationals were 100,000. The number of undocumented immigrants were 230,000. The primary sending countries were mostly Asian, such as China, Vietnam, Mongolia, the Philippines, and Bangladesh; however, some immigrants come from Nigeria, Ghana, Russia and the U.S.

Since taking office in June 2025, President Lee Jae Myung has pursued a policy shift aiming to reduce South Korea's reliance on low-wage foreign labor, arguing that the heavy reliance on migrant workers in key industries undermines domestic wage levels. His administration initiated a policy to raise the minimum salary for foreign workers and implemented a 40% reduction in foreign work visas scheduled for 2026, while also reviewing the autonomous visa issuance authority of local governments. Additionally, Lee has pursued stricter Refugee Act regulations, including restrictions on re-application for denied asylum seekers.

== Background ==
The main reason new policies were implemented was the low birth rate in Korea and decrease in population.

=== Economic growth ===
Korea experienced government-initiated rapid economic growth beginning of the 1970s, known as the "miracle of Han River". Until the end of the 1980s, Korea sustained its development without foreign laborers due to sufficient labor. However, during the 1990s the low birth rate and growing payroll costs caused a labor shortage (especially in the voluntary sector).

=== Rural female shortage ===
With development and urbanization, many people left rural areas. Young people headed for cities in search of better jobs and a better standard of living. Continuing an agrarian and Confucian society tradition, the eldest sons were left behind with their parents. This trend caused a chronic shortage of marriageable women in rural areas. International marriage began in rural areas, and most international-marriage cases are handled by dating service companies with commission.

== Policies ==
=== Nationality Act ===
Effective 14 June 1998, persons with at least one Korean parent are automatically granted Korean nationality from birth, regardless of their decision on whether to choose the nationality of the foreign parent or country of birth (if born outside Korea). The requirements for General Naturalization are as follows:

- Must have had domicile address in the Republic of Korea for more than five consecutive years
- Must be a legal adult, according to Korean civil law
- Must have good conduct
- Must have the ability to maintain a living standard on his/her own assets or skills (or is a dependent member of a family capable of that)
- Must have basic knowledge befitting a Korean national (such as an understanding of the Korean language, customs and culture

=== Eligibility for Foreigners ===
Although immigration to South Korea is low due to strict immigration policies, it is on the rise. As of 2016, foreign residents accounted for 3.4% of the total population.

Most immigrants are not eligible for citizenship or even permanent residency unless they are married to a South Korean citizen or have invested more than US$500,000 in the local economy. An exception is made for those whose non-financial contribution to the nation has been specifically recognized by the Minister of Justice and for holders of a business visa who have invested more than US$500,000.

=== Prohibition on political activities ===
Article 17, Clause 2 of the Immigration Act prohibits foreigners living in South Korea from political activity, and Article 46, Clause 8 lists deportation as a possible consequence. The law is being challenged as unconstitutional.

== Results ==
=== Statistics ===
The number of Koreans living abroad exceeds the number of migrants within Korea, with more than 2 million Koreans residing elsewhere, many in advanced countries including the United States, Canada, Australia, and Japan. Despite recent demographic shifts, there is not a systematic effort to woo back Korean nationals abroad. Most of all, what South Korea needs is workers who are willing to work in so-called 3-D (difficult, dangerous, and demanding) jobs, which many Koreans are unwilling to do. However, the country's immigration laws afford the Korean diaspora opportunities to return and work.

=== Korea's Employment Issue Solved ===
One of the Asian Tiger economic success stories, South Korea transformed from a struggling, developing nation to a prosperous, industrialized country as a result of its export-oriented strategy resulting from opening its borders. Gross national product (GNP) increased from US$142 per capita in 1967 to US$27,200 in 2015. Due to its falling unemployment rate, South Korea by the early 1990s realized it needed temporary labor to fill unskilled jobs that natives were becoming less and less willing to do. In fact, without foreign labor, coming chiefly from China and Southeast Asian countries, it would have been nearly impossible to keep the economy growing.

=== Accessibility for North Korean Refugees ===
North Koreans represent the majority of refugees in South Korea, although officially they are not considered refugees and are citizens of the Republic of Korea, since North Korea is still considered part of the Republic's territory. The numbers of North Korean “refugees” have been increasing: 947 arriving in 1998, 1,043 in 2001, 1,384 in 2005, 2,402 in 2010, and 1,275 in 2015.

=== Impact in the USA ===
Contemporary Korean immigrants tend to be highly educated and of high socioeconomic standing compared to other immigrant groups and the overall U.S.-born population. South Korean students have consistently been among the top three largest groups of international students enrolled in U.S. higher education institutions, along with Chinese and Indian nationals. Although the Korean immigrant population in the United States has decreased over the past several years, the country is still home to the largest South Korean immigrant population in the world. Japan (593,000), China (191,000), and Canada (131,000) also have large populations of South Korean immigrants. Kazakhstan hosts the largest number of North Korean immigrants (63,000), followed by the United Kingdom (15,000), Russia (11,000), and the Philippines (6,000), according to mid-2017 estimates by the United Nations Population Division.

Korean immigrants tend to have higher incomes than both the foreign- and native-born populations. In 2017, the median income of Korean immigrant households was nearly $65,000, compared to about $57,000 for all immigrant households and $61,000 for U.S.-born households.

In 2017, more than 19,200 Korean immigrants became lawful permanent residents (LPRs). The majority (59 percent) obtained this status through an employer sponsorship, and slightly more than one-third were sponsored by immediate relatives of U.S. citizens.

The government acknowledges the Korean Americans and their contribution to the society and the nation as a whole. They have even served in the armed forces and as mayors. The number of unauthorized immigrants is less as compared to the other immigrant groups.

== Problems ==
As described in the national plan for immigration policy, the Korean government desires a world-class Korea where foreigners live in harmony with Koreans. However, critics contend that the Korean government’s goals, strategies and policies are fundamentally discriminatory.

=== Abuse of Immigrants ===
There are many reports from legal and illegal immigrants which have jailed in many prisons in South Korea because of small problems or misunderstanding their visas for long time. Also, there are some reports about beating and abusing the prisoners. South Korea immigration also forced them to buy the deportation ticket.

=== Temporary Workers and Illegal Immigrants ===
Since 1991, Korea has experienced a large influx of foreign workers, and the government has utilized trainee programs since 1992. About 10,000 Asian workers came to Korea under this program in 1992, and there were about 57,000 trainees in Korea in June 1996. However, the trainee program experienced problems: the trainees became undocumented workers due to a difference in wages and since they were not classified as laborers, they were not protected by the Labor Standard Law. The Employment Permit Program for foreigners (the government's foreign-labor policy since 2004) is a product achieved by a decade of interaction between Korean citizens and foreign migrant workers. However, these issues have more details to be resolved. On the legal front, the Korean state still allows foreigners to apply for low-wage jobs and excludes them from social benefits. The social dimension of nationhood is shown by public-opinion polls of Korean citizens' attitudes towards foreign workers, which demonstrate discrimination.

=== International Marriage Fraud ===
International marriages reached the highest level in 2008, which accounted for 11 percent of the total marriages in the country. Data show that the demand for foreign spouses is particularly strong among rural never-married and urban divorced Korean men. Southeast Asian women tend to marry rural never-married men, and they are the most adaptive to the host society in the way they show among the highest rates of Korean citizenship and employment. There were more foreign-national women (65 percent) marrying South Korean men than foreign men (20 percent) tying the knot with South Korean women. South Korean men marrying foreign brides were at least more than 10 years older than their brides. Many of South Korean husbands were 45 or older while their brides were in the late 20s on average. Meanwhile, the average age differences between South Korean nationals were 3–5 years (26 percent) and 1–2 years (25 percent). Divorce by international couples, which has been declining since 2012, consisted of about 10 percent of the total number of divorces in South Korea last year.

=== Mistreatment of Foreign Brides ===
The treatment of foreign brides in Korea and their multicultural children is a political issue, covered by the media and the subject of public debate on multiculturalism. Since most immigration to Korea comes from Southeast Asia, immigrant treatment (particularly abuse of foreign brides) provokes domestic and diplomatic tensions. Koreans are conflicted about immigration, which is frequently so focused on the birth-rate problem that it is more properly called "bride-importing" than immigration.

=== Discrimination of Multicultural children ===
In recent years, Korea has experienced an increase in the number of international marriages and multicultural families, and the treatment of these families has become an important social policy issue for the Korean government. Comparison of social exclusion showed that multicultural families tend to experience a higher level of social exclusion in general than Korean families do. A multivariate analysis using a zero-inflated Poisson regression model revealed that females, elderly marriage migrants and those with lower social status were exposed to particularly higher risks of exclusion, whereas those who spoke fluent Korean or possessed fertile social networks were less likely to face social exclusion.

Children with multicultural backgrounds face discrimination at school, reflecting the prejudices against biracial people in the wider Korean society. To make Korea accommodating to them requires a change in Koreans' attitudes, according to experts. Kim Hye-young, 32, a Korean language teacher at Guro Middle School, says multicultural children at her school often face discrimination from classmates. "Children from multicultural backgrounds are treated as second-class citizens by their peers," Kim told The Korea Times on Tuesday. "Some of the students call their classmates with a Chinese parent jjang kkae." Jjang kkae is a demeaning term Koreans use to refer to Chinese people. Park Sung-choon, an ethics education professor at Seoul National University, said he made similar observations while interviewing multicultural children. "One child with a Mongolian parent that I interviewed said it happened everywhere, whether it was in the classroom, the sports field, or a playground," Park said at a multicultural family forum hosted by the Ministry of Gender Equality and Family, Tuesday. "They made fun of him and ignored him for his family background and accent."

=== Changes To Policy ===
Korea now has a comprehensive set of policies targeted specifically at marriage migrants and their families, spanning a range of policy fields that goes beyond migration to include education, social security and childcare. successive Korean governments, developing policies within a social investment framework, have actively sought female marriage migrants to perform those roles and have supported them to do so, however from a feminist viewpoint solely confining a woman to her reproductive status is very problematic. In addition, abuse can stem from the husband feeling superiority and control over a woman who is simply there to bear children rather than for a true partnership.

Policies to combat fraud marriages has also been put into place. Korea's newest policies regarding foreign marriage includes stipulations that a visa will only be issued if the income of a sponsor meets the income requirement by the Minister of Justice. In addition, the foreigner is required to have a Korean language capability to properly communicate with their Korean spouse. A sponsor must have a residential space where a marriage migrant can reside upon entering Korea. The space must be owned or rented under the name of the sponsor or a member of his/her immediate family living with him/her represented on the resident registration. Residency requirement is subject to evaluation based on the size, the number of rooms, and the number of people living in that space other than the sponsor. Lastly, If a sponsor is a naturalized Korean through marriage with a Korean national, and it has not been 3 years since the sponsor acquired Korean nationality, sponsorship of a foreign spouse is not permitted.
