= Racism in North Korea =

Racism in North Korea is a phenomenon that is relatively poorly understood. The North Korean media and government's historical usage of Korean nationalism's ethnicity-based concepts such as "pure blood" has been described as racist.

A classic North Korean short story, "Wolves" (or "Jackals",승냥이, 1951), by Han Sorya, has also been described as racist. According to the documents from Hungarian and East German records, on March 28, 1965, Lázaro Vigoa Aranguren, the ambassador of Cuba to North Korea, was leading a delegation to visit Pyongyang and tried to take a picture of Korean War ruins, when he was subsequently beaten for being a black person, which was soon followed by an apology from Kim Il Sung. A similar incident occurred in the 1960s when a WPK party secretary delivered a speech and proceeded to say that marrying foreigners was a “crime against the Korean ethnicity”, shocking the members of the visiting East German delegation in North Korea. In 2014, North Korean state media published a racist rant directed at US President Barack Obama, comparing him to a "monkey".

North Korea has taken an inconsistent stance against mixed marriages. After it became politically independent of the Soviet Union, North Korea took every effort to break marriages between Korean men and Soviet women, forcing the former wives to return to their countries. In the 1950s, after the presence of German laborers in Hamhung led to German-Korean families, North Korea ordered all German laborers to divorce their wives and go back to East Germany in the early 1960s; their children who looked Korean stayed in North Korea, while those who looked German were sent back to East Germany. However, North Korea took a different stance to the Japanese wives of male Koreans in Japan who were being repatriated to North Korea in the 1950s; all the women were given North Korean citizenship and forbidden to leave North Korea. Multiethnic marriages were also never forbidden for Chinese people in North Korea, and their applications for North Korean citizenship were always approved.

According to North Korea analyst Fyodor Tertitskiy, North Korean propaganda has "never asserted that Koreans are biologically superior" and that in fact, "such a statement was always directly condemned by Kim Jong Il". Instead, "the greatness of the Korean people lies solely in their leader. Koreans are great because they are led by Kim Il Sung, not for any other reason". He adds that having not received proper education, someone like Kim Il Sung's worldview would be "full of contradictions and logical holes", and that "Trying to explain his pattern of thinking and ruling the country with a simple theory – “the DPRK is a racist state,” “the DPRK is a traditional monarchy,” “the DPRK is a carbon copy of the USSR” – would be a distortion of the facts". He also notes that North Korea gives very little weight to racial and nationalist element in its propaganda compared to the cult of personality around its leaders.

== See also ==
- The Cleanest Race
- Propaganda in North Korea
- Racism in South Korea
