= Ch'oe Munbyŏng =

Korean righteous army leader (1557–1599)

- Born: 20th day, 4th month of 1557; Chain, Gyeongju, Joseon
- Died: 24th day, 8th month of 1599; Chain, Joseon
- Burial place: Gyeongsan, South Korea
- Citizenship: Joseon
- Military career
- Allegiance: Joseon
- Branch: Righteous Army
- Conflicts: Imjin War; Siege of Yeongcheon

Korean name
- Hangul: 최문병
- Hanja: 崔文炳
- RR: Choe Munbyeong
- MR: Ch'oe Munbyŏng

Art name
- Hangul: 성재
- Hanja: 省齋
- RR: Seongjae
- MR: Sŏngjae

Courtesy name
- Hangul: 일장
- Hanja: 日章
- RR: Iljang
- MR: Ilchang

Ch'oe Munbyŏng (Korean: 최문병; Hanja: 崔文炳; 20th day, 4th month of 1557 – 24th day, 8th month of 1599) was a Korean righteous army leader active during the mid-Joseon period. During the Imjin War, he organized and commanded a local righteous army in the Chain area of Gyeongsang and participated in military operations against Japanese forces, including those associated with the siege of Yeongcheon in 1592.

Born into the Yeongcheon Ch'oe clan in Chain, then a district of Gyeongju, Ch'oe was raised in a local gentry family. Although he received a Confucian education and maintained scholarly associations with regional literati, he did not pursue the civil service examinations and instead engaged in local study and teaching. Following the outbreak of the war in 1592, he organized a righteous army composed of local supporters and conducted operations in the Chain and Cheongdo areas while coordinating with other regional commanders.

Ch'oe later served as commander of the right division of the combined righteous army during the campaign to retake Yeongcheon in 1592. After the recapture of the fortress, he continued operations in the Chain area and remained active in righteous army activities during the war. After the war, he participated in a local movement led by regional gentry to transfer the administrative jurisdiction of Chain from Gyeongju to Daegu. He died in 1599 at his home in Chain.

== Early life ==
Ch'oe Munbyŏng was born on the 20th day, 4th month of 1557 in Chain District, Gyeongju, Gyeongsang Province, to Ch'oe Sik (최식; 崔湜) and a daughter of Chŏn Sun (전순; 全珣) of the Oksan Chŏn clan. His family was part of the Yeongcheon Ch'oe clan and maintained a tradition of success in the military service examinations. The Yeongcheon Ch'oe clan had settled in the Chain area before the mid-15th century and grew into a prominent local gentry lineage that possessed extensive landholdings and numerous slaves.

Ch'oe Munbyŏng was born into a wealthy family in Chain, but he lost his father at a young age and supported his widowed mother. In 1563, he studied under his maternal uncle Chŏn Kyŏngch'ang (전경창; 全慶昌), through whom he learned the fundamentals of Confucian learning and studied military texts. At the age of sixteen, he demonstrated scholarly insight through discussions of interpretations of the astronomical instruments described in the Transmitted Book of Documents (서전; 書傳), and he placed particular emphasis on the Elementary Learning (소학; 小學). These scholarly accomplishments were recognized by Chŏn Kyŏngch'ang. Chŏn later passed the civil service examination in 1573 and entered government service in the central administration.

From an early age, Ch'oe Munbyŏng showed little interest in pursuing the civil service examinations and instead devoted himself to study in seclusion. In 1579, he established a study hall named Injijŏngsa (인지정사; 仁智精舍) and held lectures and study sessions there with local Confucian students. In 1584, he visited Chŏng Ku and studied under him, later associating with other disciples of Chŏng Ku such as Yi Sŏkkyŏng (이석경; 李碩慶). He also formed connections with influential figures in Gyeongju and neighboring regions—including Yi Hyŏnbae (이현배; 李玄培), Kim Tŭkch'u (김득추; 金得秋)—thereby expanding his scholarly network.

== Imjin War ==
=== Raising a righteous army ===
On the 13th day, 4th month of 1592, Japanese forces appeared off the coast of Busan, marking the outbreak of the Imjin War. The First Division, led by Konishi Yukinaga, captured Dongnae, followed by Cheongdo around the 20th day of the 4th month, Gyeongsan on the 21st, and Daegu on the 23rd. The Second Division under the command of Katō Kiyomasa reached Gyeongju on the 21st day and Yeongcheon on the 23rd day, 4th month of 1592. Chain District was situated between the advance routes of the First and Second Divisions. On the 15th day of the 4th month, while attending a gathering at the local hyanggyo, Ch'oe Munbyŏng heard news of the Japanese invasion from a government clerk who had fled from Yangsan. One week later, on the 22nd day, 4th month, upon hearing that Miryang and Cheongdo had fallen, he took the spirit tablets from the family shrine and fled with his family and household servants to Murhan-dong (물한동; 勿寒洞) in Guryongsan.

On the 2nd day, 5th month of 1592, Ch'oe Munbyŏng circulated a public proclamation to gather supporters. In response, individuals such as Kim Hong (김홍; 金泓), Yu Inch'un (유인춘; 柳仁春), and Pak Yŏngsŏng (박영성; 朴永晟) rallied to his cause. Drawing primarily on local households, he organized a righteous army and, on the 7th day, 5th month of 1592, established an altar on Mount Ch'ŏnjangsan (천장산; 千丈山) and formally raised the force. The army was then divided into left and right divisions, with Kim Hong appointed commander of the right division, Yu Inch'un commander of the left division, Pak Yŏngsŏng commander of the vanguard, and Yi Sang (이상; 李祥) chief commander. In addition, fifteen local clerks and literati were appointed as officers of the force. After establishing the command structure and organizing the troops, Ch'oe Munbyŏng stationed soldiers in ambush at key points within Chain and set up a lookout post on Mount Samch'ŏnsan (삼천산; 三川山) to monitor enemy movements. He also transferred grain from his family granary to Murhan-dong to provision the army.

=== Early battles ===
On the 11th day, 5th month of 1592, Japanese forces crossed Sŏnghyŏn Pass (성현; 省峴), the pass between Gyeongsan and Cheongdo, and advanced to the Omokcheon stream (오목천; 烏鶩川) in Chain. The Japanese troops encamped there for several days and plundered nearby areas. In response, Ch'oe Munbyŏng ordered the righteous army to reorganize their ranks and strictly observe military discipline, after which he directed Yi Sang to lead the assault. The righteous army launched a charge, killing several dozen enemy soldiers and driving the Japanese forces out of Omokcheon. On the 16th day, 5th month of 1592, Japanese troops again advanced from Cheongdo into Chain. Ch'oe Munbyŏng pursued them as far as Tongch'ang (동창; 東倉) in Cheongdo and repelled them there.

Upon hearing of this victory, the Cheongdo righteous army leader Pak Kyŏngjŏn (박경전; 朴慶傳) visited Ch'oe Munbyŏng to discuss forming a joint front. Thereafter, Ch'oe Munbyŏng divided his forces into two units: one stationed at the Chain county seat and the other at Murhan-dong at the foot of Guryongsan. The position at Murhan-dong was concealed within a mountain basin and served as a strategic point linking the Sŏnam (선암; 仙巖) and Tugok (두곡; 杜谷) areas of Cheongdo. It was also located near Unmunsan, where Pak Kyŏngjŏn was based. On this basis, Ch'oe Munbyŏng and Pak Kyŏngjŏn maintained close coordination, frequently providing mutual support and discussing operational plans, while focusing their efforts on blocking Japanese lines of communication.

After the formation of the joint front, the first joint operation took place on the 20th day, 5th month of 1592, when the allied righteous armies attacked Japanese forces stationed at Tugok in Cheongdo. Ch'oe Munbyŏng advanced via Kajihyŏn Pass (가지현; 佳旨縣) and crossed Tonch'ijae Pass (돈치재) before reaching Tugok, where he joined the righteous army led by Pak Kyŏngjŏn. The two forces deployed in a pincer formation along the slopes of Mount Seonuisan (선의산; 仙義山) and engaged the enemy, killing more than one hundred Japanese soldiers and capturing ten loads of captured goods. During the battle, however, the commander Yi Sang was killed in action. On the following day, Ch'oe Munbyŏng held memorial rites for Yi Sang and returned to Chain, where he appointed Yun Ki (윤기; 尹琦) as Yi's successor and reorganized his forces.

Subsequently, Pak Kyŏngjŏn received intelligence that a large contingent of Japanese troops intended to advance toward Sŏnam, where the righteous armies had gathered, and requested assistance from Ch'oe Munbyŏng. In response, Ch'oe Munbyŏng advanced to Sŏnam on the 24th day, 5th month, and joined Pak Kyŏngjŏn. The two commanders lured the Japanese troops approaching from the direction of Mount Eoseongsan (어성산; 御城山) to Dongchangcheon Stream (동창천; 東倉川) in front of Sŏnam, where they launched a coordinated attack from both banks of the stream and defeated them. Three days later, on the 27th day, 5th month, Ch'oe Munbyŏng withdrew his forces to Kajihyŏn Pass. On the 29th day, 5th month, upon receiving information that remnants of the enemy had encamped at Tonggok (동곡; 洞谷), he set out in pursuit. Acting in concert with Pak Kyŏngjŏn, Ch'oe Munbyŏng launched a surprise attack against the Japanese troops temporarily stationed at Tonggok, defeating them and capturing a large quantity of captured goods.

=== Siege of Yeongcheon ===
On the 10th day, 6th month of 1592, Ch'oe Munbyŏng repelled Japanese forces at Paksan (박산; 愽山) in Yeongcheon. On the 22nd day, 6th month of 1592, he visited the camp of the righteous army leader Kwŏn Ŭngsu in Sinnyŏng to discuss the plans for joint operations and the recapture of the fortress Yeongcheonseong. They decided first to attack the wings of the Japanese forces in order to sever their lines of communication before launching an assault on Yeongcheonseong. While Kwŏn Ŭngsu departed to meet Pak Chin, the Army Commander of Left Gyeongsang Province, Ch'oe remained in Chain and continued to defend the area against Japanese incursions, including repelling Japanese troops together with Pak Ŭijang on the 6th day, 7th month of 1592.

When Kwŏn Ŭngsu returned to Sinnyŏng on the 9th day, 7th month of 1592, the joint operations of the righteous armies began in earnest. Together with Kwŏn Ŭngsu, Chŏng Taeim, Chŏng Sea, and other righteous army leaders, Ch'oe Munbyŏng defeated Japanese forces at Pagyŏn (박연; 朴淵) on the 14th day, 7th month of 1592, and on the following day continued to engage the enemy independently at Sogye (소계; 召溪). On the 22nd day, 7th month of 1592, he again joined Kwŏn Ŭngsu at Hayang to defeat Japanese forces, thereby securing the route between Yeongcheon and Daegu and cutting off the Japanese right wing. After severing the enemy's lines of communication, the righteous forces in Yeongcheon formulated a plan to retake the fortress. They requested reinforcements from various counties and concentrated their troops at Ch'up'yŏng (추평; 楸平), the southern plain outside Yeongcheonseong.

On the 23rd day, 7th month of 1592, Ch'oe Munbyŏng arrived at Ch'up'yŏng with the righteous troops under his command. On the following day, the allied righteous army established its command structure, adopted the name Ch'angŭijŏngyonggun (창의정용군; 倡義精勇軍), and organized the force into three divisions. Ch'oe Munbyŏng was appointed commander of the right division, while Kwŏn Ŭngsu, who had been appointed commander of the righteous army by Kim Sŏngil, assumed the position of supreme commander. Beginning on the 25th day, 7th month of 1592, the allied forces began full-scale preparations for the assault on Yeongcheonseong. They adopted fire attacks as their principal tactic, prepared siege equipment, and at the same time cut off the fortress's water supply. The main assault began on the 26th day, 7th month of 1592. The right division under Ch'oe Munbyŏng advanced toward the walls while shielding themselves with large shields against arquebus fire, drawing the Japanese forces out of the fortress. After a brief engagement, the Japanese troops retreated inside the walls.

That night, a monk of Bulguksa who had escaped from captivity reported that the Japanese were preparing a major offensive for the following day. In response, the allied righteous forces reorganized their troops into units composed of Yeongcheon natives and troops from outside the region. Although not a native of Yeongcheon, Ch'oe Munbyŏng was assigned to attack the southeast gate together with the Yeongcheon troops, as the approach to the sector was difficult due to steep cliffs. On the 27th day, 7th month of 1592, the righteous army launched its final offensive against Yeongcheonseong. Ch'oe Munbyŏng, together with Chŏng Taeim, scaled the walls and seized the south gate, then advanced toward Kaeksamun Gate (객사문; 客舍門) on the northern side of the fortress. Once the righteous army entered the fortress, fierce hand-to-hand combat broke out. When a northwesterly wind began to blow, the righteous army launched a prearranged fire attack. As a result of the fire and the ensuing fighting, many Japanese soldiers were killed, and Yeongcheonseong was recaptured.

=== Later activities ===
After the recapture of Yeongcheonseong, Pak Chin and Kwŏn Ŭngsu advanced to attack the Japanese forces in Gyeongju. Ch'oe Munbyŏng, however, did not join this campaign and instead focused on defending Chain. When he received news on the 5th day, 8th month of 1592 that Japanese troops had invaded Chain, he returned from Yeongcheon to Chain. Ch'oe Munbyŏng pursued the Japanese forces as far as Hayang and drove them back, after which he established posts and set ambushes at Sŏnghyŏn Pass to prepare for possible incursions from the direction of Cheongdo. He also set up camp below Paksan in order to monitor enemy movements toward Yeongcheon. The situation in Chain gradually stabilized after Gyeongjueupseong was recaptured under the leadership of Pak Ŭijang on the 7th day, 9th month of 1592.

On the 16th day, 8th month of 1592, Ch'oe Munbyŏng was promoted to the junior fourth rank of Grand Master for Court Dissemination (조산대부; 朝散大夫), and on the 10th day, 9th month of 1592, he was appointed Magistrate of Changgi. However, due to wounds sustained in battle, he was unable to assume the post. Ch'oe Munbyŏng continued his activities with the righteous army thereafter, achieving victories after the 8th month of 1593 at places such as Ahwa (아화; 阿火), Sŏakgang Hill (서악강; 西岳岡), and T'aehwap'yŏng Plain (태화평; 太和平). When the Japanese forces withdrew from Joseon in 1598, Ch'oe Munbyŏng gathered his soldiers, commended them for their service, and formally disbanded the righteous army.

== Later life ==
In 1599, shortly after the war, the local gentry of Chain initiated a movement to detach Chain District from Gyeongju and place it under the jurisdiction of Daegu as part of efforts to rebuild local society. Ch'oe Munbyŏng played a leading role in this movement. Drawing on the prestige of the official appointments he had received through his service during the Imjin War, he participated in the petition for the transfer of Chain's administration and, together with Ch'oe Tusŏng (최두성; 崔斗星), submitted a memorial to the provincial governor.

The precise reasons for pursuing incorporation into Daegu remain unclear. Historians Yi Gwang-woo and Lee Soo-hwan, however, suggest several contributing factors: the failure to resolve problems related to taxation and corvée labor, the enhanced status of the local elites of Chain due to their active participation in the righteous armies during the Imjin War, and the heavy burden imposed by Gyeongju's administrative pressures and interference in the immediate aftermath of the war. Ultimately, Ch'oe Munbyŏng's petition failed due to opposition from officials affiliated with Gyeongju.

=== Death ===
Ch'oe Munbyŏng fell ill in the 4th month of 1599 and died at his home in Ulgok-ri, Chain, on the 4th day, 8th month of the same year. His funeral was held on the 10th day, 10th month at the foot of Guryongsan. He was posthumously promoted to the junior second rank of Grand Master for Excellent Virtue (가선대부; 嘉善大夫) and Right Assistant Mayor (우윤; 右尹) of Hansŏng.

== Legacy ==
=== Memorials ===
A shrine was later established to commemorate Ch'oe Munbyŏng. In 1710 local officials and nearby Confucian literati proposed the construction of a shrine, and in 1711, construction began at Wŏndang-ri to the east of Chain. When the shrine hall was completed in 1712, Ch'oe Munbyŏng's spirit tablet was enshrined there, and the shrine was named Ch'unghyŏnsa (충현사; 忠賢祠). Ch'unghyŏnsa was later elevated to the status of a seowon under the name Yonggyeseowon (용계서원; 龍溪書院) in 1786 during the reign of King Jeongjo, but it was demolished in 1868 following the decree abolishing seowon. Yonggyeseowon was restored in 1979 with support from the Ministry of Culture and Information and the Yeongcheon Ch'oe clan association.

Injijŏngsa, which Ch'oe Munbyŏng had established in 1579 as a place for teaching, served during the Imjin War as a gathering place for the righteous army under his command. After his death the institution was renamed Injijae Hall (인지재; 仁智齋), and in the early eighteenth century it was relocated to a site southwest of Yonggyeseowon and used as a local village school. After Yonggyeseowon was abolished, Injijae served as the place where Ch'oe Munbyŏng's spirit tablet was kept until the seowon's restoration. When Yonggyeseowon was restored in 1979, its ritual function ceased, and the building subsequently fell into serious disrepair. On 18 January 2021, Injijae was designated Local Cultural Heritage No. 1 of Gyeongsan.

=== Relics ===
Horse Saddle of Choe Mun-byeong, Righteous Army Commander is a horse saddle believed to have been produced in the late sixteenth century and traditionally said to have been used Ch'oe Munbyŏng himself during the Siege of Yeongcheon. The saddle measures 56 × 39 × 34 cm, while the flaps measure 105 × 26 cm. The saddle frames are made of hedgehog skin leather, and chrysanthemum motifs are carved on the surface. The saddle was originally preserved in the holdings of Yonggyeseowon. It was later transferred to the Daegu National Museum and is currently deposited at the Gyeongsan Museum. Because its component parts remain intact and its state of preservation is excellent, the object has been recognized for its historical and cultural value and was designated Treasure No. 747 on 7 May 1983.
