= Chŏng Taeim =

Korean general (1553–1594)

- Born: 4th day, 6th month of 1553; Yeongcheon, Joseon
- Died: 8th day, 6th month of 1594; Yeongcheon, Joseon
- Burial place: Yeongcheon, South Korea
- Military career
- Allegiance: Joseon
- Conflicts: Imjin War; Battle of Pagyŏn; Siege of Yeongcheon; 2nd Siege of Gyeongju; 3rd Siege of Gyeongju

Korean name
- Hangul: 정대임
- Hanja: 鄭大任
- RR: Jeong Daeim
- MR: Chŏng Taeim

Art name
- Hangul: 창대
- Hanja: 昌臺
- RR: Changdae
- MR: Ch'angdae

Courtesy name
- Hangul: 중경
- Hanja: 重卿
- RR: Junggyeong
- MR: Chunggyŏng

Chŏng Taeim (Korean: 정대임; Hanja: 鄭大任; 4th day, 6th month of 1553 – 8th day, 6th month of 1594) was a Korean literatus and righteous army leader active during the mid-Joseon period. He participated in local righteous army activities in the Gyeongsang Province during the Imjin War, including the recapture of Yeongcheon Fortress in 1592.

Born in Yeongcheon to the Yeonil Chŏng clan, he studied under his great-uncle from an early age. After the death of his parents in 1562, he observed a three-year mourning period and thereafter resumed his studies. He later discontinued preparation for the civil service examinations and focused on scholarly study.

At the outbreak of the Imjin War in 1592, he raised a righteous army in the Yeongcheon region. He carried out ambushes against Japanese troops in Tangjisan mountain and surrounding areas and participated in the Battle of Pagyŏn, in which combined righteous army forces engaged a Japanese detachment. In the 7th month of 1592, he served as commander of the Center Division of the combined righteous army that besieged and recaptured Yeongcheon Fortress.

He subsequently joined government forces in operations against Gyeongju Fortress, which was recaptured in the 9th month of 1592. In 1593, he received official appointments, serving as magistrate of Pian and later of Yecheon. He continued to take part in military operations in Gyeongsang Province. In 1594, after passing the military examination, he fell ill and died in Yeongcheon.

== Early life ==
Chŏng Taeim was born on the 4th day, 6th month of 1553 in Yeongcheon. He belonged to the Yeonil Chŏng clan; His father was Chŏng Yong (정용; 鄭容), and his mother was a daughter of Kim Ŭngsaeng (김응생; 金應生) of the Gyeongju Kim clan.

Chŏng Taeim began his studies at the age of seven under his paternal granduncle Chŏng Yunsik (정윤식; 鄭允湜), who had served as magistrate of Chinbo and Bonghwa. In 1562, after losing both parents, he observed a three-year mourning period, during which he devoted himself to scholarship and the management of his ancestral graves. In 1568, at the instruction of Chŏng Yunsik, he took up residence at Chayang, where he associated with contemporaries such as Chŏng Sea and further deepened his studies. Following the death of his granduncle in 1569, Chŏng Taeim discontinued preparation for the civil service examinations in 1573 and instead concentrated on the study of the Chujasŏ chŏryo.

== Imjin War ==
=== Raising a righteous army ===
On the 13th day, 4th month of 1592, Japanese forces appeared off the coast of Busan, marking the outbreak of the Imjin War. The following day, they captured Busanjin Fortress and then attacked Dadaejin Fortress and Dongnae Fortress. Japanese forces under the command of Katō Kiyomasa reached Yeongcheon on the 23rd day, 4th month of 1592 and occupied several fortresses in Andong, Sinnyŏng, and surrounding areas. In early the 5th month of 1592, together with his kinsman Chŏng Taein (정대인; 鄭大仁), he raised a righteous army; approximately sixty men, including Cho Hŭiik (조희익; 曹希益), Yi Pŏn (이번; 李蕃), and Chŏng Ch'ŏlli (정천리; 鄭千里), responded to the call. The group acclaimed Chŏng Taeim as commander of the righteous army, appointing Cho Sŏng (조성; 曺誠) and Cho Tŏkki (조덕기; 曺德騏) as deputy commanders.

Chŏng Taeim dispatched Yi Pŏn to Kim Yunguk (김윤국; 金潤國), the magistrate of Yeongcheon who had taken refuge at Myogaksa temple (묘각사; 妙覺寺), to request cooperation, and sent Chŏng Ch'ŏlli to Pak Chin, Army Commander of Left Gyeongsang Province, to report the formation of the righteous army. In response, Pak Chin appointed Chŏng Taeim as ambush commander. Thereafter, through Yi Pŏn and others, he persuaded refugees to enlist and recruited approximately 900 righteous soldiers. Chŏng Taeim's forces commenced active operations in early the 5th month of 1592, beginning with the repulse of Japanese troops at Taedong (대동; 大洞).

=== Early battles ===
On the 5th day, 7th month of 1592, Chŏng Taeim received intelligence that approximately 300 Japanese troops under the command of a general identified as Mayang (마양; 馬楊) had appeared along key routes in the Sinnyŏng area and were committing acts of plunder in places such as Wach'on (와촌; 瓦村). In response, he stationed Chŏng Ch'ŏlli and others in ambush on the slopes of Sŏnghwangdang Beacon Station (성황당 봉수; 城隍堂 烽燧) to monitor enemy movements. He also dispersed his main forces to strategic points along the northern routes and at Tangjisan mountain (당지산; 唐旨山) in preparation for a surprise attack. On the 11th day, 7th month of 1592, when the Japanese troops reached Tangjisan mountain, Chŏng Taeim launched a sudden assault with his concealed forces. The Japanese, taken by surprise, were routed. In this engagement, Chŏng Taeim killed the Japanese commander Mayang and captured spoils of war.

On the 14th day, 7th month of 1592, at Pagyŏn (박연; 朴淵), a key transportation point in Sinnyŏng, Chŏng Taeim joined forces with Kwŏn Ŭngsu, Chŏng Sea, and Hong Ch'ŏlloe (홍천뢰; 洪天賚) to confront another Japanese detachment. At the time, approximately one hundred Japanese soldiers, disguised in Joseon attire and impersonating secret royal inspectors, were moving toward Yeongcheon while committing acts of plunder. The allied righteous forces lay in ambush at Kŏrimwŏn (거림원; 迲林院) and Yŏŭmdong (여음동; 餘音洞) and launched a surprise attack. The defeated Japanese troops dispersed and retreated toward Ŭihŭng and Hayang. Chŏng Taeim, together with Chŏng Sea, pursued those fleeing toward Hayang and once again defeated them in the vicinity of Wach'on. In this battle, the allied righteous army killed more than thirty Japanese soldiers and captured long swords, spears, and horses.

=== Siege of Yeongcheon ===
Following the Battle of Pagyŏn, the Yeongcheon righteous army leaders Chŏng Taeim and Chŏng Sea sought to attack the Japanese forces stationed at Yeongcheon and recapture the fortress. After severing the Japanese lines of communication, the righteous forces developed a plan for the recapture of Yeongcheon Fortress. They requested reinforcements from neighboring counties and assembled their troops at Ch'up'yŏng (추평; 楸平), the southern plain outside the fortress. Chŏng Taeim joined the allied forces from the northern sector with local militia, encamping at Ch'up'yŏng on the 23rd day, 7th month of 1592, where he conducted military training.

On the 24th day, 7th month of 1592, the allied righteous army at Ch'up'yŏng established a formal military command structure and consolidated approximately 4,000 troops into a unified formation as the Ch'angŭijŏngyonggun (창의정용군; 倡義精勇軍). The force was divided into three divisions. Chŏng Taeim was appointed commander of the Center Division, while Kwon Ŭngsu, who had been appointed commander of the righteous army by Kim Sŏngil, assumed command as supreme commander. The righteous army leaders also swore an oath of alliance, pledging to retake Yeongcheon Fortress.

As commander of the Center Division, Chŏng Taeim proclaimed strict military regulations. He publicly announced four capital prohibitions: executing anyone who spread disorder within the ranks, retreated upon sighting the enemy, disobeyed a commander's orders, or abandoned formation during battle. From the 25th day, 7th month of 1592, the allied righteous forces began full-scale preparations for the assault on Yeongcheon Fortress. They adopted fire attack as their principal tactic, procuring brushwood and gunpowder for this purpose, and manufacturing scaling ladders and shields for siege operations. In addition, they deployed a selected detachment of approximately 400 troops to attack Japanese soldiers drawing water outside the fortress, thereby disrupting the water supply within the fortress.

On the 26th day, 7th month of 1592, full-scale combat commenced. Japanese forces sallied out in an attempt at a counterattack but, after engagement, were forced to retreat into the fortress. That night, a monk of Bulguksa who had been held captive by the Japanese escaped and returned to the righteous army camp, reporting that the Japanese planned a general offensive on the following day, the 27th day, 7th month of 1592. In response, Chŏng Taeim, together with Chŏng Sea, proposed dividing the forces into two contingents to meet the anticipated assault. Accordingly, the army was reorganized into units composed of Yeongcheon natives and troops from outside the region, with Chŏng Taeim assuming command of the Yeongcheon contingent. He concentrated scaling ladders at the East and West Gates and assigned a selected detachment of 500 men under Chŏng Ch'ŏlli to be stationed at Mahyŏnsan mountain (마현산; 馬峴山).

On the 27th day, 7th month of 1592, the allied righteous army launched its final assault on Yeongcheon Fortress. Because the Yeongcheon-born troops under Chŏng Taeim were familiar with the fortress terrain, they attacked the southeastern cliffs, which were difficult to access. In particular, Chŏng focused his attack on the Yŏngyangnamnu Pavilion (영양남루; 永陽南樓) at the South Gate. The Japanese command responded by opening the gate and sallying forth, while troops inside the fortress provided covering fire with arquebuses. Chŏng Taeim personally urged on his officers and led the charge. After intense close combat, the Japanese forces retreated into the fortress, and Chŏng's troops entered through the South Gate. During this engagement, Chŏng Taeim pursued and beheaded Pŏphwa (법화; 法化), the Japanese commande under Fukushima Masanori, who leapt into the Namch'ŏn stream (남천; 南川). Following their entry, hand-to-hand fighting ensued within the fortress. When a northwesterly wind arose, the righteous army executed the prearranged fire attack, and many Japanese soldiers were killed in the ensuing blaze and combat. As a result, Yeongcheon Fortress was recaptured.

=== Siege of Gyeongju ===
After the recapture of Yeongcheon Fortress, the Righteous Army and government forces set Gyeongju Fortress as their next objective. Pak Chin concentrated his troops at Angang, and on the 19th day, 8th month of 1592, Chŏng Taeim joined him there with his forces. At approximately 11 p.m. on the 20th day, 8th month of 1592, after completing a military inspection, the Joseon army advanced toward Gyeongju with Kwŏn Ŭngsu in the vanguard. Arriving at Gyeongju Fortress at dawn on the 21st day, 8th month of 1592, Pak Chin established his command headquarters at Kŭmjangdae Pavilion (금장대; 金藏臺) and ordered that the fortress be encircled from the east, west, and north.

In the initial phase of the battle, the Joseon forces held the advantage. However, Japanese reinforcements that had been lying in ambush at Baengnyulsa Temple (백률사; 栢栗寺) and at the local Confucian school joined the fighting, reversing the tide and placing the Joseon army in danger of encirclement. When Japanese troops inside the fortress subsequently sallied out to counterattack, the Joseon forces retreated under pursuit. Chŏng Taeim escaped through the East Gate and withdrew in the direction of Bunhwangsa Temple.

Thereafter, operations to retake Gyeongju Fortress were reorganized under the leadership of Pak Ŭijang, who had been entrusted with command by Pak Chin. On the 7th day, 9th month of 1592, the Joseon army launched a renewed assault on the fortress, with Chŏng Taeim participating in coordination with Pak Ŭijang. An offensive employing Pigyŏk chinch'ŏlloe (time-fused explosive shells) was carried out, and on the 8th day, 9th month of 1592, the fortress was finally recaptured.

== Later life ==
Chŏng Taeim participated in the oath gathering held at Palgongsan Mountain on the 29th day, 9th month of 1592. Twenty men attended the gathering, including Sŏ Chaegyŏm (서재겸; 徐再謙) and Ch'oe Tongbo (최동보; 崔東輔) of Daegu and Kim T'aehŏ (김태허; 金太虛) of Miryang, and they took a blood oath, smearing blood on their lips. Chŏng composed an oath poem pledging loyalty together with other Righteous Army leaders. In the spring of 1593, Chŏng was appointed Magistrate of Pian, where the post had been vacant, and in the 4th month he led government troops in battle at Dongnae. On the 4th day, 5th month of 1593, he was promoted to the rank of General for Planning Strategies (선략장군; 宣略將軍) and appointed Vice Director (첨정; 僉正) at the Office of Military Training (훈련원; 訓鍊院).

On the 8th day, 6th month of 1593, Chŏng joined forces with Kwŏn Ŭngsu, Army Commander of the Left Gyeongsang Province, and Yi Suil, Naval Commander of the Left Gyeongsang Province, participating as a reconnaissance commander in the Battle of T'aehwajin (태화진; 太和津) in Ulsan. He led five successive engagements, during which more than fifty Japanese soldiers were killed and the enemy was driven back to Ulsan Fortress. On the 18th day, 7th month of 1593, he was promoted to the rank of Grand Master for Moral Instruction (중훈대부; 中訓大夫) and appointed Magistrate of Yecheon. In the intercalary 11th month, he was appointed Army Commander (우후; 虞候) of Left Gyeongsang Province and devoted himself to military training and martial instruction.

=== Death ===
In the 2nd month of 1594, Chŏng Taeim was urged by King Seonjo to sit for the military examination and subsequently passed. He was granted a jade belt and a silver hwando by the king. He later operated in the Sangju area but fell ill and returned to his native place, where he died on the 8th day, 6th month of 1594.
