= Chŏng Sea =

Korean righteous army leader (1535–1612)

Duke Kangŭi Chŏng Sea
- Born: 1535; Yeongcheon, Joseon
- Died: 3rd day, 11th month of 1612; Yeongcheon, Joseon
- Burial place: Yeongcheon, South Korea
- Citizenship: Joseon
- Occupation: Literati official
- Military career
- Allegiance: Joseon
- Branch: Righteous Army
- Conflicts: Imjin War; Battle of Pagyŏn; Siege of Yeongcheon; 2nd Siege of Gyeongju

Korean name
- Hangul: 정세아
- Hanja: 鄭世雅
- RR: Jeong Sea
- MR: Chŏng Sea

Art name
- Hangul: 호수
- Hanja: 湖叟
- RR: Hosu
- MR: Hosu

Courtesy name
- Hangul: 화숙
- Hanja: 和叔
- RR: Hwasuk
- MR: Hwasuk

Posthumous name
- Hangul: 강의
- Hanja: 剛義
- RR: Gangui
- MR: Kangŭi

Chŏng Sea (Korean: 정세아; Hanja: 鄭世雅; 1535 – 3rd day, 11th month of 1612) was a Korean literatus and righteous army leader active during the mid-Joseon period. He participated in local righteous army activities in the Gyeongsang Province during the Imjin War, including the recapture of Yeongcheon Fortress in 1592.

Born in Yeongcheon into the Yeonil Chŏng clan, he was educated by his father, a disciple of Yi Hwang, and passed the Literary Licentiate Examination in 1558. Thereafter he maintained scholarly associations in the Yeongnam region, trained students, and participated in study halls and poetry gatherings.

At the outbreak of the Imjin War in 1592, Chŏng Sea organized a righteous army in Yeongcheon composed of disciples, local residents, and monk-soldiers. He was appointed commander and later served in a staff capacity within the regional forces. He participated in the Battle of Pagyŏn, in which combined righteous army units engaged Japanese troops. He took part in preparations for the recapture of Yeongcheon Fortress, including logistical arrangements, troop organization, and preparations for incendiary attacks and siege operations.

Chŏng subsequently joined the siege of Gyeongju. During the fighting, his son was killed while assisting in the withdrawal of Joseon forces. After 1593 he continued to participate in oath assemblies. In his later years, he retired to Yeongcheon, where he engaged in scholarship and education until his death in 1612.

== Early life ==
Chŏng Sea was born in 1535 in Yeongcheon. He belonged to the Yeonil Chŏng clan; his father was Chŏng Yullyang (정윤량; 鄭允良), and his mother was a daughter of Ch'oe Tŏkkŭm (최덕금; 崔德嶔) of the Yeongcheon Ch'oe clan.

Chŏng Sea studied from an early age under his father, who had been a disciple of Yi Hwang. In 1558, he sat for the Literary Licentiate Examination (진사시; 進士試). In the preliminary stage, he composed the historical narrative poem "Zither Terrace" (금대; 琴臺), based on the love story of Sima Xiangru and Zhuo Wenjun, and in the second stage he wrote "Remonstrating Against Digging a Pond in Cold Weather" (천한간각지; 天寒諫鑿池), which depicted the lives and hardships of commoners mobilized for fortress construction, thereby passing the examination. He maintained close relations with Chu Pak (주박; 周博), who took first place in that year's examination, and with fellow successful candidate Cho Kwangik (조광익; 曺光益).

In 1565, Chŏng Sea traveled to the capital to participate in a memorial calling for the execution of Pou. Pou had been appointed abbot of Bongeunsa by Queen Munjeong, who promoted pro-Buddhist policies, leading to conflict with Neo-Confucian literati. After Queen Munjeong died on the 6th day, 4th month of 1565, successive memorials were submitted demanding Pou's execution. On the 23rd day, 7th month of 1565, a memorial campaign led by Kim Kyŏngbu (김경부; 金敬夫) and Confucian scholars from the Yeongnam region was launched, and Chŏng joined it, traveling to the capital to petition for Pou's punishment. However, the memorial was not approved by King Myeongjong, and Chŏng subsequently returned to his home region.

=== Hermit life ===
Thereafter, Chŏng Sea showed little interest in official office and instead continued to associate with friends and travel widely. On the 15th day, 7th month of 1590, he visited Yu Chŏng (유정; 柳汀) together with Kŭm Nansu (금난수; 琴蘭秀) and Cho Tŏkki (조덕기; 曺德驥) during a journey in the mountains. The group held a gathering at which they drank together and discussed the political situation of the time.

神翁書授讀兵年
貫日孤忠已感天
百鍊龍泉能斷石
萬旗圍壘一無全

In his youth he received military instruction from a divine elder;
His solitary loyalty, piercing the sun, had already moved Heaven.
The hundred-tempered Dragon-Spring sword could cleave stone
Encircled by ten thousand banners, no fortress stood.

— Chŏng Sea at Mount Chusasan, 1590

The party then proceeded south to Bulguksa, ascended Yŏngjirŭ Pavilion (영지루; 影池樓), and composed quatrains using the character "rae" (래; 來) as the rhyme word; the following day, they climbed Mount Chusasan (주사산; 朱砂山) and composed poems using the character "ch'ŏn" (천; 天) as the rhyme. On the 28th day, 7th month, they reached Ch'isullyŏng Pass and exchanged poems. On their return, they stopped at Gyeongju and held a poetry gathering at Pŏmyŏngnu Pavilion of Bulguksa, where they discussed the state of the realm.

Chŏng Sea developed ties with leading figures in the Yeongnam region, including Gyeongju and Ulsan, and trained numerous disciples, thus forming a broad network of associates. In 1591, he repaired a study hall named Yonggyesŏsa, originally founded by his father, and devoted himself to teaching and mentoring younger scholars.

== Imjin War ==
=== Raising a righteous army ===
On the 13th day, 4th month of 1592, Japanese forces appeared off the coast of Busan, marking the outbreak of the Imjin War. Japanese forces under the command of Katō Kiyomasa reached Yeongcheon on the 23rd day, 4th month of 1592 and occupied several fortresses in Andong, Sinnyŏng, and surrounding areas. In the early 5th month of 1592, upon learning that Hansŏng had fallen and that King Seonjo had fled the capital, Chŏng Sea discussed the possibility of raising a righteous army with his eldest son, Chŏng Ŭibŏn (정의번; 鄭宜藩). He subsequently resolved to initiate an uprising together with Yu Mongsŏ (유몽서; 柳夢瑞), Cho Hŭiik (조희익; 曹希益), and Chŏng Ŭibŏn. They mobilized approximately 200 disciples, commoners, and monk-soldiers, as well as more than 700 additional militias.

Chŏng Sea was proclaimed commander of the righteous army and organized the force by appointing Ch'oe Pyŏngnam (최벽남; 崔壁南) and Yun Ping (윤빙; 尹聘) as deputy commanders. In its initial phase, the unit primarily conducted ambushes against small Japanese detachments engaged in looting. In the 6th month, he also participated in the Munch'ŏn Alliance, an oath assembly at Gyeongju led by Yun Inham, Mayor of Gyeongju. As a result, Chŏng Sea was officially appointed commander of the Yeongcheon righteous army by Pak Chin, Army Commander of Left Gyeongsang Province, and Kim Sŏngil, the Pacification Commissioner (초유사; 招諭使).

=== Battle of Pagyŏn ===
When Kim Sŏngil appointed Kwŏn Ŭngsu as commander of the righteous army and designated Chŏng Sea and others as commanders of local units in their respective counties, thereby establishing a coordinated chain of command among the righteous forces. On the 14th day, 7th month of 1592, Chŏng Sea fought alongside Chŏng Taeim, Kwŏn Ŭngsu, and Sin Hae (신해; 申海) against Japanese troops at Pagyŏn (박연; 朴淵), a key strategic junction linking Ŭihŭng and Yeongcheon. On that day, more than one hundred Japanese soldiers, masquerading as secret royal inspectors, plundered local inhabitants while disguised in Joseon clothing and moved southward from Gunwi toward Yeongcheon.

When the Japanese forces reached Pagyŏn, the allied righteous army units, which had lain in ambush at Kŏrimwŏn (거림원; 迲林院) and Yŏŭmdong (여음동; 餘音洞), launched a surprise attack. The defeated Japanese troops retreated in scattered groups toward Ŭihŭng and Hayang. Chŏng Sea pursued those fleeing toward Hayang and again routed them in the vicinity of Wach'on (와촌; 瓦村). In this engagement, the allied righteous forces killed more than thirty Japanese soldiers and captured swords, spears, and horses.

=== Siege of Yeongcheon ===
After the Battle of Pagyŏn, Chŏng Sea sought to attack the Japanese forces stationed at Yeongcheon and to recapture the fortress. Having first severed the Japanese lines of communication, the righteous forces formulated a detailed operational plan for the recovery of Yeongcheon Fortress. They requested reinforcements from various counties and concentrated their troops at Ch'up'yŏng (추평; 楸平), the southern plain outside Yeongcheon Fortress. On the 24th day, 7th month of 1592, the allied righteous army established a formal military command structure and reorganized its units under the designation Ch'angŭijŏngyonggun (창의정용군; 倡義精勇軍), and Chŏng Sea was appointed staff officer.

Chŏng Sea transferred the troops he had raised to supreme commander Kwŏn Ŭngsu and, serving as a staff officer, assumed responsibility for operational planning as well as the management of provisions and military supplies. The allied righteous forces adopted fire attack as their principal tactic, securing kindling and gunpowder for this purpose and manufacturing siege ladders and shields. They also deployed an advance unit of approximately 400 men to attack Japanese soldiers drawing water outside the fortress, thereby cutting off the water supply within the walls.

Full-scale fighting commenced on the 26th day, 7th month of 1592. The Japanese forces sallied out of the fortress in an attempt to counterattack but, after engagement, withdrew inside the walls. That night, a monk from Bulguksa who had been held captive by the Japanese escaped and reported intelligence that a general offensive was being planned. In response, Chŏng Sea proposed dividing the forces to meet the anticipated assault. The army was accordingly reorganized into units composed of men from Yeongcheon and those from outside the region, and Chŏng Sea was assigned to the Yeongcheon contingent under the command of Chŏng Taeim.

On the 27th day, 7th month of 1592, the righteous army launched its final assault on Yeongcheon Fortress. The Yeongcheon-born volunteers, including Chŏng Sea, exploited their familiarity with the local topography and attacked the southeastern cliffs, a sector difficult to assault. The Japanese forces opened the gates and sallied forth, while troops inside the fortress provided covering fire with arquebuses. After fierce close combat, the Japanese retreated into the fortress, and the righteous army entered through the South Gate. Hand-to-hand fighting then unfolded within the walls. When a northwesterly wind arose, the righteous forces executed their prearranged fire attack, resulting in significant casualties on the Japanese amid the blaze and ensuing combat. As a result, Yeongcheon Fortress was recaptured.

=== Siege of Gyeongju ===
After the recapture of Yeongcheon Fortress, righteous army units and government forces designated Gyeongjueupseong as their next target. Pak Chin concentrated the righteous forces of Left Gyeongsang Province together with regular troops at Angang. On the 20th day, 8th month of 1592, Chŏng Sea joined these forces after engaging Japanese units in Chain and obstructing the route between Gyeongsan and Cheongdo. Later that night, at approximately 11 p.m., the Joseon army advanced toward Gyeongju after conducting a military inspection, with Kwŏn Ŭngsu leading the vanguard.

The troops reached Gyeongjueupseong at dawn on the 21st day, 8th month of 1592. Pak Chin established his headquarters at Kŭmjangdae Pavilion (금장대; 金藏臺) and directed that the fortress be surrounded from the eastern, western, and northern approaches. Chŏng Sea, together with the Yeongcheon righteous army contingent, was assigned responsibility for operations on the western sector of the siege under the command of Kwŏn Ŭngsu. During the initial stage of the engagement, Joseon forces maintained a tactical advantage. Subsequently, however, Japanese reinforcements positioned at Baengnyulsa Temple (백률사; 栢栗寺) and at the local Confucian school entered the battle. Their intervention altered the course of the fighting and exposed the Joseon forces to the risk of encirclement.

When Japanese troops inside the fortress launched a sortie, the Joseon army withdrew under pursuit. Chŏng Sea and the righteous forces on the western front made a last stand at Kyeyŏn (계연; 鷄淵) outside the West Gate but, after sustaining heavy casualties, were compelled to retreat. In the course of this retreat, Chŏng lost his horse and mounted the horse offered by his son, Chŏng Ŭibŏn, in an attempt to break through the encirclement. Amid the confusion of close combat, however, they became separated; Chŏng Sea succeeded in escaping, whereas Chŏng Ŭibŏn was killed in action. Gyeongjueupseong was later recaptured in the 9th month of 1592, in an assault led by Pak Ŭijang.

== Later life ==
In 1593, after the recapture of Pyongyang and Hansŏng, Chŏng Sea placed the righteous forces under the command of Cho Hŭiik in the 11th month and returned to Yeongcheon. He then conducted the funeral rites for his son, Chŏng Ŭibŏn, who had been killed in the siege of Gyeongju. Although the body could not be recovered, he performed a soul-summoning rite using an arrow and, after receiving elegiac writings from acquaintances, placed them in the coffin together with his son's official garments for burial. When Chŏng Taeim died in 1594, Chŏng Sea also took charge of his funeral.

<八公山會盟韻>
兵場方見士無雙
斷斷危忱父母邦
如我白頭何所補
故携兒子自琴江

<Rhyme on the Alliance at Palgongsan>
On the field of arms I have just seen a peerless warrior,
His resolute loyalty to his fatherland,
As for me, white-haired—what service can I yet render?
Thus I bring my youngs from the Geum River.

— Chŏng Sea at Palgongsan, 1596

In 1596, amid fears of a renewed Japanese invasion, Chŏng went to Palgongsan and, in the 9th month, held an oath assembly with righteous army leaders from other regions. On the 28th day, 9th month of 1596, they performed a blood oath. Thirty-two commanders each composed a single five-character line incorporating their courtesy name, producing a linked sequence of thirty-two lines. Among these, Chŏng Sea contributed the line "堯庭命和叔" (요정명화숙; 'At the court of Yao, He Shu received his charge'), likening his courtesy name Hwasuk (화숙; 和叔) to He Shu who served Emperor Yao and expressing his aspiration for a peaceful and well-governed age. He also composed "Rhyme on the Alliance at Palgongsan" (팔공산회맹운; 八公山會盟韻) to record the intent of the oath. On the 21st day, 7th month of 1597, he further participated in the oath assembly convened at Hwawangsan under the leadership of Kwak Chaeu.

=== Post-war life ===
After the war, in 1599 Chŏng Sea established the study hall Chahojŏngsa (자호정사; 紫湖精舍) on the banks of the Jahocheon Stream (자호천; 紫湖川) and retired there, devoting himself to scholarly pursuits. At this retreat he associated with Cho Hoik, Chang Hyŏn'gwang, and Son Ch'ŏnul (손처눌; 孫處訥), engaging in discussions on moral principles and instructing younger scholars. In the 9th month of 1600, Yi Wŏnik visited Chahojŏngsa and subsequently reported on Chŏng Sea to the court. He was subsequently appointed Record Keeper (봉사; 奉事) of the Directorate of Military Procurement (군자감; 軍資監), but he did not assume the post.

Thereafter, Chŏng relocated Imgo seowon, a Confucian academy dedicated to the commemoration of Chŏng Mongju that had been destroyed during the Imjin War, to Toil-dong (도일동; 道日洞) and rebuilt it, securing the reissuance of its royal charter. In 1607, he was appointed Circuit Inspector (찰방; 察訪) of post stations on the Hwangsan Route (황산도; 黃山道) and served for several months before resigning and returning home.

In his later years Chŏng devoted himself to scholarship and the education of local students in his native district, and he died at his residence in Yeongcheon on the 3rd day, 11th month of 1612.
