= Kwŏn Ŭngsu =

Korean general (1546–1608)

Prince Hwasan Kwŏn Ŭngsu
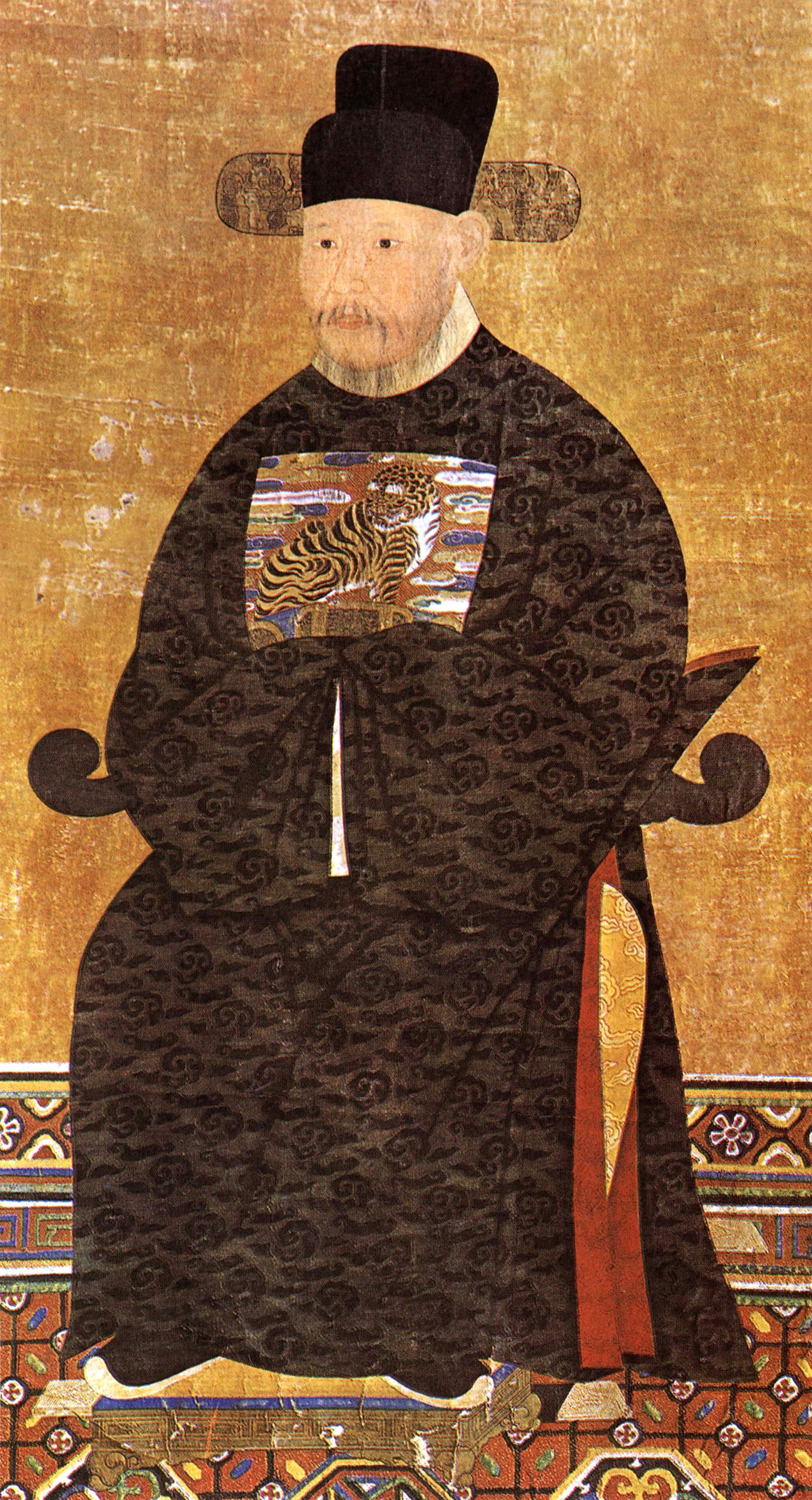
- Portrait of Kwŏn Ŭngsu
- Born: 21st day, 11th month of 1546; Sinnyŏng, Joseon
- Died: 13th day, 7th month of 1608; Hansŏng, Joseon
- Burial place: Yeongcheon, South Korea
- Military career
- Allegiance: Joseon
- Conflicts: Imjin War; Battle of Pagyŏn; Siege of Yeongcheon; 2nd Siege of Gyeongju; 1st Siege of Ulsan
- Awards: 3rd Sŏnmu Merit Subjects

Korean name
- Hangul: 권응수
- Hanja: 權應銖
- RR: Gwon Eungsu
- MR: Kwŏn Ŭngsu

Royal title
- Hangul: 화산군
- Hanja: 花山君
- RR: Hwasangun
- MR: Hwasan'gun

Art name
- Hangul: 백운재
- Hanja: 白雲齋
- RR: Baekunjae
- MR: Paegunjae

Courtesy name
- Hangul: 중평
- Hanja: 仲平
- RR: Jungpyeong
- MR: Chungp'yŏng

Posthumous name
- Hangul: 충의
- Hanja: 忠毅
- RR: Chungui
- MR: Ch'ungŭi

Kwŏn Ŭngsu (Korean: 권응수; Hanja: 權應銖; 21st day, 11th month of 1546 – 13th day, 7th month of 1608) was a Korean military leader of the mid-Joseon period. He is remembered for his role in the early campaigns of the Imjin War, particularly in the recapture of Yeongcheon Fortress in 1592. In 1604 he was invested as a second-rank Sŏnmu Merit Subject and ennobled as Prince Hwasan.

Born in Sinnyŏng, Kwŏn entered government service after passing a special military examination in 1584. He subsequently held posts related to frontier and provincial defense. At the outbreak of the Imjin War in 1592, after the Japanese landings at Busan, he returned to his native region and organized a righteous army.

In the summer of 1592, Kwŏn engaged Japanese forces around Pagyŏn and subsequently commanded a coalition of righteous and regular troops in the siege and recapture of Yeongcheon Fortress. He later took part in operations against Gyeongju and subsequently held military posts in Left Gyeongsang Province. During the Japanese invasion of 1597, he participated in Joseon–Ming allied operations, including the campaign against Ulsan.

After the war, Kwŏn held a series of high-ranking military and court appointments. In 1604, following deliberation by the Office of Meritorious Subjects, he was recorded as a Sŏnmu Merit Subject, and his portrait was placed in the Hall of Meritorious Subjects. He died in 1608 in Hansŏng.

== Early life ==
Kwŏn Ŭngsu was born on the 21st day, 11th month of 1546 in Sinnyŏng. His father was Kwŏn Tŏksin (권덕신; 權德臣), and his mother was a daughter of Yi Yun'gyŏm (이윤겸; 李云謙) of the Seongju Yi clan. He belonged to the Andong Kwŏn clan; his great-grandfather Kwŏn Yŏl (권열; 權挒), who criticized state administration during King Yeonsangun's reign and was subsequently subjected to the extermination of his family, left a testament instructing his descendants not to enter official service. In accordance with this injunction, his grandfather Kwŏn Ran (권란; 權鸞) and his father Kwŏn Tŏksin did not pursue government posts.

In 1579, Kwŏn Ŭngsu lost his parents and wife to an epidemic and subsequently observed the customary three-year mourning period. In his youth, he trained in archery and horsemanship in preparation for potential incursions by the Jurchens and by Japanese forces. In 1584, setting aside his great-grandfather's injunction in light of mounting military threats, he took and passed the special military examination.

In 1585, Kwŏn Ŭngsu was appointed Assistant Record Keeper (부봉사; 副奉事) at the Office of Military Training (훈련원; 訓鍊院). On the 4th month of the same year, he was assigned to Ŭiju, where he carried out defensive duties along the northern frontier. In 1588, he returned to his native region, engaged in agricultural pursuits, and trained younger men. In 1591, he joined the staff of Pak Hong, then Naval Commander (수군절도사; 水軍節度使) of Left Gyeongsang Province.

== Imjin War ==
=== Raising a righteous army ===
On the 13th day, 4th month of 1592, Japanese forces appeared off the coast of Busan, marking the outbreak of the Imjin War. The following day, they captured Busanjin Fortress and then attacked Dadaejin Fortress and Dongnae Fortress. As Japanese troops rapidly pushed toward Dongnae and the Naval Headquarters of Left Gyeongsang Province, Pak Hong burned the ships and provisions under his command and retreated to Sosan Post Station (소산역; 蘇山驛).

In the wake of Pak Hong's withdrawal, Kwŏn Ŭngsu resigned his post and returned to his native region of Sinnyŏng. Meanwhile, Japanese forces under the command of Katō Kiyomasa reached Yeongcheon on the 23rd day, 4th month of 1592 and occupied several fortresses in Andong, Sinnyŏng, and surrounding areas. Amid this situation, on the 27th day, 4th month of 1592, Kwŏn Ŭngsu rallied more than one hundred men and raised a righteous army. Those who joined him included his younger brothers Kwŏn Ŭngjŏn (권응전; 權應銓), Kwŏn Ŭngp'yŏng (권응평; 權應平), and Kwŏn Ŭngsaeng (권응생; 權應生), as well as the local functionary Yi Onsŏ (이온수; 李蘊秀) and U Ŭnggŏ (우응거; 于應据).

The righteous army led by Kwŏn Ŭngsu achieved its first recorded success on the 6th day, 5th month of 1592, when it killed thirteen Japanese soldiers engaged in plundering at Hanch'ŏn (한천; 漢川). In addition, it killed more than two hundred ruffians who were under the command of the local official of Yeongcheon and the government slave Hŭison (희손; 希孫), who had colluded with Japanese forces and pillaged the populace. Subsequently, the unit continued its operations: on the 18th day, 5th month of 1592, it killed five Japanese soldiers; on the 27th day, 5th month of 1592, it killed ten more and captured over twenty bandits aligned with the Japanese army.

In the 6th month of 1592, When Pak Chin was appointed Army Commander of Left Gyeongsang Province and moved to Cheongsong, Kwŏn Ŭngsu proceeded to Pak Chin's camp to coordinate efforts for the recovery of Andong, Yean, and other occupied areas. Pak Chin subsequently appointed Kwŏn Ŭngsu as Auxiliary Defense Officer (조방장; 助防將). On the 9th day, 7th month of 1592, Kwŏn Ŭngsu returned to Sinnyŏng. Historian Choi Hyosik argues that this withdrawal stemmed from Pak Chin's distrust and hostility toward Kwŏn Ŭngsu. By contrast, Kim Chinsu interprets the move as a deliberate delegation, suggesting that Pak Chin entrusted Kwŏn Ŭngsu with independent operational responsibility for the Sinnyŏng and Yeongcheon regions.

=== Battle of Pagyŏn ===
After returning to Sinnyŏng, Kwŏn Ŭngsu formed a coalition with the Yeongcheon righteous army leaders Chŏng Sea and Chŏng Taeim, as well as Hong Ch'ŏlloe (홍천뢰; 洪天賚) of Ŭihŭng, and launched operations against Japanese forces in the vicinity of Pagyŏn (박연; 朴淵). Pagyŏn was a strategic transportation hub located in Sinnyŏng. At the time, approximately one hundred Japanese soldiers, disguised in Joseon attire and impersonating secret royal inspectors, were moving toward Yeongcheon while committing acts of plunder. Kwŏn Ŭngsu stationed commanders and troops in ambush at key points, including Kŏrimwŏn (거림원; 迲林院) and Yŏŭmdong (여음동; 餘音洞), in preparation for engagement.

On the 14th day, 7th month of 1592, when the Japanese forces arrived, fighting ensued. Defeated in battle, the Japanese troops fled in two directions—north toward Ŭihŭng and west toward Hayang. Kwŏn Ŭngsu, together with Hong Ch'ŏlloe, pursued the contingent retreating toward Ŭihŭng as far as Sogye (소계; 召溪) and routed them there. In the battle, the allied righteous forces killed over thirty Japanese soldiers and captured long swords, spears, and horses.

=== Siege of Yeongcheon ===
On the 22nd day, 7th month of 1592, Kwŏn Ŭngsu repelled Japanese forces at Sogye and Sach'ŏn and blocked the principal routes leading into Yeongcheon Fortress. After severing the enemy's lines of communication, the righteous forces under his leadership formulated a plan to retake the fortress. They requested reinforcements from neighboring counties, and Kwŏn Ŭngsu gathered local militias from Cheongsong, Hayang, and other areas, assembling the combined forces at Ch'up'yŏng (추평; 楸平), the southern plain outside Yeongcheon Fortress.

Advancing from Wach'on (와촌; 瓦村) on the 23rd day, Kwŏn Ŭngsu ascended a western hill overlooking the Japanese main force. On the following day, he reorganized the troops assembled at Ch'up'yŏng and established a formal military command structure. He consolidated approximately 4,000 righteous army members gathered from Sinnyŏng, Yeongcheon, Hayang, Chain, and Ŭihŭng, together with regular government soldiers, into a unified force designated as the Ch'angŭijŏngyonggun (창의정용군; 倡義精勇軍). The army was divided into three divisions—Left, Center, and Right. Kwŏn Ŭngsu assumed overall command as supreme commander, appointing Sin Hae (신해; 申海) as commander of the Left Division, Chŏng Taeim as commander of the Center Division, and Ch'oe Munbyŏng as commander of the Right Division.

On the 25th day, 7th month of 1592, preparations commenced for the assault on Yeongcheon Fortress. After reconnoitering enemy positions together with Kwŏn Ŭngp'yŏng, Kwŏn Ŭngsu returned and, with selected troops, launched a surprise attack against Japanese soldiers who had come out to draw water, successfully repelling them. At the same time, in anticipation of employing fire attacks, the forces gathered dry timber, hay, and gunpowder, and equipped themselves with scaling ladders, shields, and other siege implements.

At dawn on the 26th day, Kwŏn Ŭngsu selected a corps of 500 picked soldiers at the vanguard, while he himself ascended earthen mound, raised the military banner, and initiated the assault by firing cannon. He then advanced with the vanguard and killed seven Japanese soldiers. After returning to earthen mound to continue directing operations, he personally shot and killed more than ten additional enemy soldiers. During the engagement, as the tide of battle turned against them, the Japanese troops withdrew into Yeongcheon Fortress. That night, intelligence obtained from a monk of Bulguksa who had escaped from the fortress indicated that the Japanese planned a full-scale offensive on the 27th day, 7th month of 1592. In response, the allied righteous forces reorganized their troops for the siege, dividing them into contingents composed of soldiers native to Yeongcheon and those from outside the region. Kwŏn Ŭngsu, together with Pak Ŭijang and Sin Hae, was assigned to the non-Yeongcheon contingent and directed the assault on the West and North Gates.

On the morning of the 27th day, under Kwŏn Ŭngsu's command, the assault on the West and North Gates of Yeongcheon Fortress commenced. However, the righteous forces initially failed to advance. In response, Kwŏn Ŭngsu enforced strict military discipline by executing several soldiers who refused to advance, thereby compelling the troops to press forward and breach the two gates. When approximately 1,000 Japanese soldiers opened the gates and sallied forth, Kwŏn Ŭngsu personally led the counterattack and killed enemy troops in close combat. The righteous army subsequently entered the fortress, where intense hand-to-hand fighting ensued. As a northwesterly wind arose, the righteous forces launched a fire attack. Many Japanese soldiers perished in the ensuing blaze and combat. Consequently, Yeongcheon Fortress was recaptured.

=== Siege of Gyeongju ===
After the recapture of Yeongcheon Fortress, the righteous army and the regular forces set their next objective as Gyeongju Fortress. Pak Chin concentrated the righteous armies of Left Gyeongsang Province and regular troops at Angang. At approximately 11 p.m. on the 20th day, 8th month of 1592, Pak Chin, having completed a military inspection, appointed Kwŏn Ŭngsu as vanguard commander and advanced toward Gyeongju. At dawn on the 21st day of the 8th month, Kwŏn Ŭngsu advanced at the head of the forward detachment toward Gyeongju Fortress. Upon the army's arrival and the establishment of headquarters at Kŭmjangdae Pavilion (금장대; 金藏臺), Pak Chin ordered the fortress to be encircled on three sides—east, west, and north. Kwŏn Ŭngsu led the Yeongcheon righteous army contingent and assumed responsibility for operations in the western sector of the siege.

The attack commenced with the burning of houses as a signal. In the early phase of the battle, Japanese forces were heavily pressed by Joseon forces and retreated into the fortress. Around noon, however, Japanese reinforcements lay in ambush in the vicinity of Baengnyulsa Temple (백률사; 栢栗寺) and the local Confucian school joined the fighting, turning the tide and placing the Joseon army in an encirclement. At the same time, Japanese troops within Gyeongju Fortress sallied out and launched a counterattack, forcing the Joseon forces to retreat under pursuit. The righteous army contingent on the western front, commanded by Kwŏn Ŭngsu, continued to resist to the end at Kyeyŏn (계연; 鷄淵) outside the West Gate, but ultimately withdrew after sustaining heavy casualties. In the course of this engagement, Kwŏn Ŭngsu was thrown from his horse and suffered injuries. Gyeongju Fortress was later recaptured in the 9th month of 1592, through the assault led by Pak Ŭijang.

=== Later campaigns ===
In the 9th month of 1592, Kwŏn Ŭngsu was promoted to the rank of General of Breaking Spears (절충장군; 折衝將軍) in recognition of his role in the recapture of Yeongcheon Fortress, and was appointed Army Commander (우후; 虞候) of Left Gyeongsang Province. In the 12th month of the same year, he was appointed Auxiliary Defense Officer of Left Gyeongsang Province, and in the 2nd month of 1593 he was promoted to Army Commander of Left Gyeongsang Province.

In the 2nd month of 1593, together with the Provincial Patrol Commissioner (巡察使; 순찰사) Han Hyosun, he repelled Japanese forces at Tangyo (당교; 唐橋). Thereafter, he conducted military operations in Sanyang (산양; 山陽), Andong, and Miryang, among other locations. In the 9th month of the same year, he was appointed Defense Commander (방어사; 防禦使) of Left Gyeongsang Province, and in the 7th month of 1594 he concurrently assumed the post of Defense Commissioner of Chungcheong Province.

=== Chŏngyu War ===
In the early 9th month of 1596, Toyotomi Hideyoshi declared a renewed invasion of Joseon. In the 1st month of 1597, Japanese forces led by Konishi Yukinaga and Katō Kiyomasa were stationed at Sŏsaengp'o and other locations. In response, Kwŏn Ŭngsu joined forces with Sŏng Yunmun, Ko Ŏnbaek, and others, stationing troops in the Gyeongju area in an effort to block the enemy's advance toward the Choryŏng Pass (조령; 鳥嶺) route. However, in the late 7th month of 1597, the Japanese army concentrated at Miryang and then advanced northward toward Jeolla Province, bypassing Gyeongju.

On the 10th day, 11th month of 1597, when the court reorganized Joseon forces into three field armies in order to strengthen coordination with Ming forces, Kwŏn Ŭngsu, together with approximately 200 soldiers under his command, was assigned to the Second Army under Sŏng Yunmun. At that time stationed at Wolseong, he advanced as far as Sangju in accordance with court orders to cooperate with the Ming army, where he received the Ming Vice Commander Haesaeng, and subsequently returned with him to Gyeongju.

The Joseon–Ming allied forces assembled at Gyeongju on the 20th day, 12th month of 1597 in preparation for operations against Ulsan Fortress. The assault on Ulsan Fortress commenced on the 22nd day, and Kwŏn Ŭngsu participated in the engagement alongside Sŏng Yunmun and Pak Ŭijang. The allied forces sustained their offensive for thirteen days, until the 4th day, 1st month of 1598, but ultimately withdrew after suffering heavy casualties. On the following day, Kwŏn Ŭngsu and other Joseon commanders regrouped at Gyeongju to reorganize their forces. On the 22nd day, 9th month of 1598, the Joseon–Ming allied forces again launched an assault on Ulsan Fortress; however, they failed to achieve decisive results and withdrew on the 4th day, 10th month of 1598. After the death of Toyotomi Hideyoshi, Japanese forces evacuated Joseon in the 11th month of 1598.

== Later life ==
After the Imjin War, on the 22nd day, 2nd month of 1599, Kwŏn Ŭngsu was appointed Magistrate of Miryang. There he trained troops and cultivated military farms, reorganizing the regional defense system. At this time, he was also promoted to the junior second rank of Grand Master for Excellent Virtue (가선대부; 嘉善大夫). In the 11th month of 1600, citing illness, he resigned from office and returned to his hometown. On the 1st month of 1601, he was appointed Senior Military Protector (상호군; 上護軍) of the Hobun Royal Guards (호분위; 虎賁衛), but did not assume the post; in the 7th month of the same year, he resettled in Sinnyŏng.

On the 9th month of 1602, Kwŏn was appointed Commander of the Naegŭm Royal Guards, and proceeded to Hansŏng. In the 11th month, he additionally held the office of the First Secretary (도정; 都正) of the Office of Military Training. On the 1st month of 1603, he was appointed Army Commander of Hwanghae Province, but was soon replaced due to illness and transferred to the post of Second Deputy Director (동지사; 同知事) of the Privy Council.

=== Merit ===
In the 4th month of 1603, the Office of Meritorious Subjects (공신도감; 功臣都監) proposed the selection of Sŏnmu Merit Subjects in recognition of distinguished service during the Imjin War from among 26 candidates, including Kwŏn Ŭngsu. King Seonjo favored restricting the number of investitures to a few central figures, including Yi Sun-sin, Wŏn Kyun, Kwŏn Yul, and Ko Ŏnbaek. Court officials, however, argued that meritorious military commanders should be rewarded in order to encourage loyalty and valor in the event of future conflicts. Following the office's strong recommendation, and in recognition of his role in the recapture of Yeongcheon Fortress, Kwŏn Ŭngsu's investiture was approved.

On the 25th day, 6th month of 1604, he was formally invested as a second-rank Sŏnmu Merit Subject and ennobled as Prince Hwasan (화산군; 花山君). In accordance with this distinction, he received from King Seonjo copies of the Xin Jing and the Zuo Zhuan, and in the 7th month was promoted to the senior second rank of Grand Master for Upholding State Laws (자헌대부; 資憲大夫). In the 9th month of the same year, his portrait was enshrined in the Hall of Meritorious Subjects (공신각; 功臣閣), and he was additionally granted a separate portrait. He also received slaves, land, clothing, and horses as royal gifts, and the official ranks of his family members were elevated. On the 28th day, 10th month of 1604, Kwŏn Ŭngsu attended the oath ceremony of the meritorious subjects, and in the 2nd month of 1607 participated in the banquet hosted by King Seonjo to honor their achievements.

=== Death ===
When King Seonjo died in the 2nd month of 1608, Kwŏn Ŭngsu proceeded to the capital and entered the palace to pay his respects. Around this time he fell ill, and on the 13th day, 7th month of 1608, at the age of sixty-three, he died at an inn in Hansŏng.
