= Yi Suil =

Korean military leader (1554–1632)

Great Lord of Kyerim Yi Suil
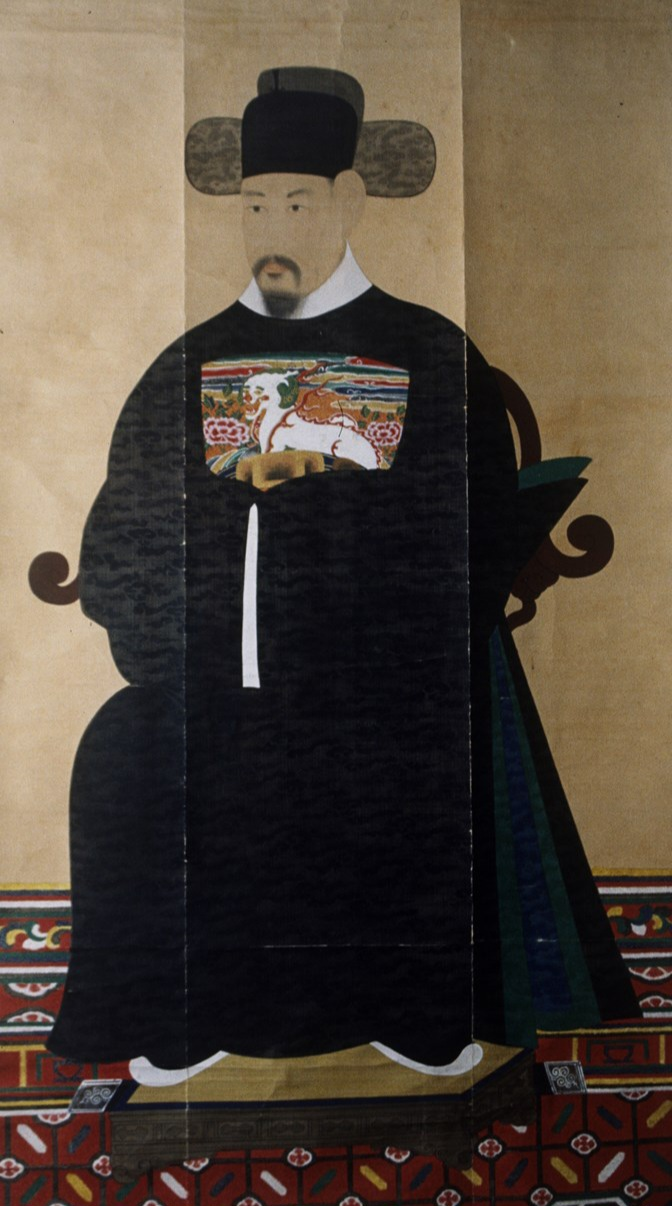
- Born: 1st day, 4th month of 1554; Chungju, Joseon
- Died: 27th day, 5th month of 1632; Hansong, Joseon
- Burial place: Tomb of Yi Suil; Chungju, South Korea
- Military career
- Allegiance: Joseon
- Conflicts: Imjin War; 1st Siege of Gyeongju; Korean–Jurchen border conflicts; Siege of Not'o; Siege of Suŭlhŏ·Kyoro; Yi Kwal's Rebellion; Battle of Anhyeon
- Awards: 2nd Chinmu Merit Subject

Korean name
- Hangul: 이수일
- Hanja: 李守一
- RR: I Suil
- MR: I Suil

Art name
- Hangul: 은암
- Hanja: 隱庵
- RR: Eunam
- MR: Ŭnam

Courtesy name
- Hangul: 계순
- Hanja: 季純
- RR: Gyesun
- MR: Kyesun

Posthumous name
- Hangul: 충무
- Hanja: 忠武
- RR: Chungmu
- MR: Ch'ungmu

Yi Suil (Korean: 이수일; Hanja: 李守一; 1st day, 4th month of 1554 – 27th day, 5th month of 1632) was a Korean general of the mid-Joseon period. Born in Chungju in 1554, Yi Suil passed the special military examination in 1583 and began his service on the northern frontier.

In 1592, while serving as Magistrate of Changgi, Yi Suil faced the outbreak of the Imjin War broke out. He marched with his forces toward Gyeongju but was defeated, after which he served under Han Hyosun in military actions at Yŏnghae, Andong, Yecheon, and elsewhere. In 1593, Yi Suil was appointed Provincial Naval Commander of Left Gyeongsang, established a naval base in Changgi, and reactivated operations of the Left Gyeongsang Naval Forces. As Naval Commander, he distinguished himself in engagements at Ulsan and Ch'ilp'o.

After the Imjin War, Yi Suil served as Provincial Military Commander of North Hamgyong, overseeing campaigns to pacify Not'o, Suŭlho, and Kyoro settlements. as well as construction projects, including the rebuilding of Jinju Fortress and the creation of a new fortress at Songjin. During the reign of King Gwanghaegun, he was repeatedly entrusted with command in the north, serving three separate terms as Provincial Military Commander of North Hamgyong.

During the reign of King Injo, Yi Suil played a role in suppressing Yi Kwal's rebellion in 1624, securing victory at the Battle of Anhyŏn. For his service, he was credited as a Second-rank Chinmu Merit Subject. In subsequent years he held several high offices, including Commander-in-Chief of the Naval Forces of the South, Minister of Justice, and Commander of the Defense of Namhansanseong. In the 3rd month of 1632, at the age of seventy-nine, Yi Suil petitioned for retirement, which King Injo approved. Yi Suil died on the 27th day, 5th month of 1632 at his residence.

== Early life and career ==
Yi Suil was born on the 1st day, 4th month of 1554 at Sigok (시곡; 柿谷) in Chungju, Joseon. He belonged to the Gyeongju Yi Clan; his father, Yi Ran (이란; 李鸞), was posthumously invested with the title Great Lord of Wŏlsŏng, while his mother was a daughter of U Tamnyŏng (우담령; 禹聃齡) of the Danyang U clan. Following his father's death in 1582, Yi, together with his elder brothers Yi Yuil (이유일; 李惟一) and Yi Kŭgil (이극일; 李克一), tended to their mother while preparing for the state examinations.

In the 1st month of 1583, when Nit'anggae instigated a major uprising in Kyongwon, the court announced a special military examination in the 5th month, with the final test held in the 8th month. To reinforce defenses along the northern frontier, the quota of successful candidates was significantly increased, resulting in the appointment of 500 military officials. Yi Suil passed the examination, receiving a thirdclass placement with a ranking of 375th.

In 1584, Yi Suil entered service as a Probationary Record Keeper (권지봉사; 權知奉事) at the Office of Military Training (훈련원; 訓鍊院). Two years later, in 1586, he attained the post of Junior Ninth-rank Military Officer (권관; 權管) at Sonongbo (소농보; 小農堡) in Samsu, Hamgyong Province, after which he served under the regional commander Sin Kak. In 1590, he was appointed Royal Messenger (선전관; 宣傳官), and the following year, in 1591, he assumed the magistracy of Changgi.

== Imjin War ==
=== Outbreak of the Imjin War ===
On the 14th day, 4th month of 1592, following the outbreak of the Imjin War, Yi Suil, acting in accordance with the provisions of the Chesŭng Pangnyak, a regional defense strategy, mobilized his forces toward Gyeongju. Together with Pak Ŭijang, then serving as Executive Assistant to Magistrate (판관; 判官) of Gyeongju, Yi committed himself to the defense of Gyeongju Fortress, implementing a siege posture by sealing the city gates. However, on the 21st day of the same month, the Japanese Second Division under Katō Kiyomasa advanced on the fortress. Faced with mass desertions and an overwhelming numerical disadvantage, the defenders were routed.

Yi consequently withdrew through the western gate of the fortress and retreated to Changgi. On the 23rd day, 4th month of 1592, when a Japanese detachment pressed forward into Changgi territory, Yi positioned his forces outside the local fortress but was once more compelled to retreat in the face of superior enemy strength. Subsequently, he joined Han Hyosun, Magistrate of Yŏnghae, to conduct coordinated operations against Japanese incursions. For his contributions in repelling enemy forces that had entered Yŏnghae, Yi was received promotion in the 6th month to the senior third rank of Grand Master for Comprehensive Governance (통정대부; 通政大夫). He also participated in the defense of Yonggung under Han Hyosun, who, by this time, had been elevated to Provincial Governor (관찰사; 觀察使) of Left Gyeongsang.

Yi was appointed Magistrate of Miryang in the 10th month of 1592. Yet, in the following month, the Office of the Inspector-General filed a petition contending that his recent promotion had been excessive, as his military record lacked exceptional distinction. Consequently, his rank was demoted to the junior fourth rank of Grand Master for Court Dissemination (조산대부; 朝散大夫), though he retained the magistracy of Miryang. While in office, Yi participated actively in military campaigns across Andong, Yecheon, and surrounding districts under Han Hyosun's command. In recognition of his performance, he was appointed on the 10th day, 3rd month of 1593 to the position of Provincial Naval Commander (수군절도사; 水軍節度使) of Left Gyeongsang.

=== Provincial Naval Commander of Left Gyeongsang ===
With the outbreak of the Imjin War, Gyeongsang Province—serving as the principal corridor of Japanese advance—was plunged into temporary disorder, while the Left Gyeongsang Naval Forces were virtually incapacitated, conducting little to no effective operations. Consequently, when Yi Suil assumed the office of Provincial Naval Commander of Left Gyeongsang, his initial activities were conducted primarily on land rather than at sea. On the 8th day, 6th month of1593, in concert with Kwŏn Ŭngsu, Provincial Military Commander of Left Gyeongsang, Yi launched an assault upon Japanese positions at Ulsan, during which their encampments were set ablaze, more than fifty were slain, and many others sustained injuries.

Drawing upon his earlier tenure as Magistrate of Changgi, Yi established a naval base at P'oip'o (포이포; 包伊浦), the naval garrison of Changgi, where he revived the operations of the Left Gyeongsang Naval Forces. From this base, he convened his subordinate naval officers, requisitioned fishing vessels, and oversaw the construction of warships, thereby enlarging his force. In the 7th month of 1593, when seven Japanese ships advanced, Yi, together with Mun Kwando (문관도; 文貫道), Commander of Ch'ilp'o, engaged them in combat and succeeded in capturing four enemy vessels. For this success, Yi was elevated to the junior second rank of Grand Master for Excellent Virtue (가선대부; 嘉善大夫).

Although Yi's fleet achieved successes at sea, the limited size of his forces and the rough seas along the East Coast restricted operations, and the Left Gyeongsang Naval Forces frequently served in the capacity of land troops, as in the 11th month of 1593, when they participated in the defense of Gyeongju following the Battle of Angang. Meanwhile, in recognition of their contributions, the court, during the winter of 1593, dispatched Royal Messenger To Wŏnnyang (도원량; 都元亮) to provide military support, including the construction of nine warships placed under Yi's command. Building upon this reinforcement, Yi's forces captured scattered Japanese troops along the southern reaches of the East Coast. In the 2nd month of 1595, when Japanese warships intruded at Chikchŏndo (직전도; 稷田島) in Yŏnil, Yi, in alliance with Hong Ch'angse, Magistrate of Yŏnil, engaged and defeated them. Shortly thereafter, following the death of his mother, Yi briefly returned to his family home, but soon resumed his duties at headquarters.

=== After Provincial Naval Commander ===
In 1596, Supreme Commander (도체찰사; 都體察使) Yi Wŏnik sought to bring Yi Suil into his service as subordinate general. However, that autumn, as Nurhaci's power expanded, Yi was instead appointed Magistrate of Hoeryong to reinforce the northern defenses. Shortly thereafter, on the grounds that the southern provinces held greater strategic importance than the northern frontier, he was reassigned as Magistrate of Naju in the 1st month of 1597 . Yi, however, did not immediately assume this post. Remaining in Hoeryong, he was entrusted with the troops assembled by Chŏng Munbu, Magistrate of Kilju, and ordered to lead them southward. Before he could formally take office, he was instead appointed in the 4th month of 1597 as Magistrate of Seongju, where the Supreme Field Headquarters had been established.

In the 7th month of 1597, with the outbreak of the Chŏngyu War, the Japanese launched a renewed offensive into the Korean interior. In the 9th month, Yi, alongside Ko Ŏnbaek, Mun Sinŏn (문신언; 文愼言), and others, engaged Japanese forces in the Seongju region, where he reportedly killed twenty-one enemy combatants. At the beginning of 1598, however, Yi fell ill and was unable to resume active duty. The Chŏngyu War ended in the 11th month of 1598 with the Japanese withdrawal, and in the following 12th month Yi was appointed Provincial Military Commander of Right Gyeongsang. Yet in the 1st month of 1599, in the aftermath of the withdrawal, Yi entered into conflict with the Ming official Xu Guanlan over postwar arrangements concerning Suncheon Castle. As a consequence, Yi was dismissed from office and subjected to interrogation. Following a reinvestigation, during which he was defended by the Ming general Mao Guoqi, Yi was reinstated on the 20th day, 2nd month of 1599 as Magistrate of Seongju.

== Northern border conflicts ==
=== Siege of Not'o settlement ===
Meanwhile, Nurhaci, who viewed the Pŏnho—long allied with Joseon—as potential targets of annexation, initiated attacks on the Not'o settlement along the upper Tumen River in the 1st month of 1598. Tensions further escalated in the 3rd month of 1599, when Jurchens of the upper Tumen ambushed Joseon reconnaissance forces, prompting the court to prepare a punitive expedition against the Not'o settlement. To this end, Yi Suil was appointed Provincial Military Commander of North Hamgyong in the 7th month of 1599.

In the 3rd month of 1600, following a Jurchen raid on Puryong, Joseon court seized upon the incident as grounds to implement the planned campaign against the Not'o settlement. On the 14th day, 4th month of 1600, Yi organized a force of three thousand troops into three divisions—Center, Left, and Right—dispatching them from Musan, Ŏyugan (어유간; 魚遊澗), and Pungsan respectively, while he accompanied along the Center Division. At dawn on the 15th, the three divisions executed a coordinated offensive. Yi directed the Left Division to cut off the enemy's retreat, while advancing with the Center and Right Divisions. The Joseon forces destroyed seven settlements, including the Not'o stronghold, before withdrawing the following day to Pungsan Fort at Hoeryong.

=== Siege of Suŭlhŏ and Kyoro settlements ===
In the 8th month of 1600, the Suŭlho and Kyoro settlements of Onsong, in alliance with the Hūlun of the Haixi Jurchens, launched attacks against rival settlements and assisted in the siege of Onsong. In response, Yi Ŭnghae (이응해; 李應獬), Magistrate of Onsong, devised a punitive plan against the two settlements, with Yi Suil placed in command of the operation. On the 20th day, 12th month of 1600, the court authorized the campaign, and Yi Suil and Yi Ŭnghae scheduled it for the 1st month of the following year.

Yi Suil assembled troops primarily from the Six Garrisons of Hamgyong Province, organizing them into three divisions—Center, Left, and Right. Command of these divisions was assigned respectively to Army Commander (우후; 虞候) Yi Yujik (이유직; 李惟直), Magistrate of Onsong Yi Ŭnghae, and Magistrate of Chongsong Yi Hongbo (이홍보; 李弘輔). On 27th day, 1st month of 1601, Yi Suil ordered the simultaneous advance of all three divisions against the Suŭlho and Kyoro settlements. Through a surprise attack, the Joseon forces decisively destroyed both communities.

=== Fortifications ===
In the 12th month of 1602, Yi Suil was appointed Provincial Military Commander of Right Gyeongsang. On the 18th day, 8th month of 1603, he transferred the provincial military headquarters from Changwon to Ch'oksŏksansŏng (촉석산성; 矗石山城) in Jinju, concurrently assuming the office of Magistrate of Jinju. Also, for his contribution in reconstructing the war-ravaged fortress of Jinju, he was elevated to the senior second rank of Grand Master for Upholding State Laws (자헌대부; 資憲大夫).

On the recommendation of Chief State Councillor Yu Yŏnggyŏng, Yi was appointed Magistrate of Kilju in the 8th month of 1605. At this time, in response to the mounting threat on the northern frontier, the court resolved to strengthen the mountain fortresses of Kilju and Myongchon. As Magistrate, Yi oversaw the fortress works at Kilju, which commenced around the 12th month of 1605. In the 7th month of 1606, however, it was decided to relocate the project to Songjin, since the Kilju fortress lay too far from Myongchon and the local populace favored Songjin as the construction site. The new fortress at Songjin was completed by the beginning of the 12th month that same year. However, in the 1st month of 1607, Yi Suil was dismissed from office on the grounds that he had willfully postponed assuming his post beyond the prescribed term and had repeatedly tendered letters of resignation. Two months later, in the 3rd month, he was reinstated to government service as Military Protector (호군; 護軍). Subsequently, in the 6th month of the same year, he was appointed Magistrate of Suwon.

=== Career during Gwanghaegun reign ===
Following the enthronement of King Gwanghaegun in the 2nd month of 1608, Yi Suil was reappointed as Provincial Military Commander of North Hamgyong in the 6th month. AlthAlthough his term formally expired in the 8th month of 1610, the unsettled conditions along the northern frontier made it impractical to replace both the Provincial Governor and the Provincial Military Commander at once, and no suitable successor was available. Accordingly, the court extended Yi's tenure. In the 2nd month of 1612, he was further appointed concurrently as Provincial Military and Naval Commander of Pyongan and Magistrate of Yŏngbyŏn.

Yi Suil subsequently held a succession of posts: in 1614 he was appointed Chief Commander of the Ch'ungjang Guards (충장위; 忠壯衛); in 1615 he served as Provincial Fourth Superintendent (지사; 知事); and in 1616 he became Chief Commander of the Capital Police Bureau, where he distinguished himself by arresting the rebel Yi Ch'ungi (이춘기; 李春起). For this achievement, he was promoted to the lower junior first rank of Grand Master for Esteemed Governance (숭정대부; 崇政大夫). In the 7th month of the following year, he was again appointed Provincial Military Commander of North Hamgyŏng, but when he tendered his resignation on account of advanced age, the court refused to accept it. In the 7th month of 1618, he was further elevated to the upper junior first rank of Grand Master for Esteemed Nobility (숭록대부; 崇祿大夫) in recognition of his service as Chief Commander of the Capital Police and for his long-standing duties of escort and protection. Although his term as Provincial Military Commander expired in 1619, the court requested that he remain in office, and only in the 2nd month of 1622 was Yi Suil relieved of his command in North Hamgyong.

== Career during Injo reign ==
In the 3rd month of 1623, during the Injo Coup, Yi Suil was serving as Mobile Border Commander (순변사; 巡邊使) and was stationed near the Military Headquarter of North Hamgyong at the time of the coup. In the 7th month of 1622, he had also held the office of Special Entry Officer (특진관; 特進官), where he took part in the Royal Lecture and counseled King Injo that the appointment of competent magistrates was crucial for the administration of the northern frontier. Between the 7th and 8th months of that year, he further served three times as examiner for the military service examination.

=== Yi Kwal's rebellion ===
On the 16th day, 1st month of 1623, the court was alerted to Yi Kwal's impending rebellion, which he initiated on the 22nd together with Han Myŏngnyŏn and others. On the 24th Chang Man was appointed Commander-in-chief (도원수; 都元帥), and the following day Yi Suil was designated Provincial Military Commander of Pyongan and Vice Commander-in-chief of the Three Provinces (Pyongan, Hamgyong, Hwaghae).

Yi Suil moved toward Sohung with the objective of securing the strategic corridor that connected Pyongyang and Hansŏng the insurgent forces under Yi Kwal circumvented his position and advanced directly upon the capital. On the 10th day, 2nd month of 1623, upon receiving intelligence that Hansŏnghad already fallen to the rebels, the loyalist commanders reorganized their troops and established camps at Anhyŏn (안현; 鞍峴). At this juncture, Chang Man deployed his forces on the northern perimeter of the hill, oriented southward, while Yi Suil occupied positions on its southern flank. The prevailing east wind obscured the loyalist encampment from the view of the rebel army.

On the morning of the following day, Yi Kwal, misapprehending the strength of government forces, initiated an assault. The vanguard contingents of both sides engaged in initial skirmishes, after which the conflict temporarily reached an impasse. Subsequently, the wind veered to the northwest, a development that proved advantageous for the loyalists. Yi Suil directed his troops against the rebel main body from the rear, disrupting their formations and throwing the insurgent army into disarray. Part of Yi Kwal's central army fled southward to escape Yi Suil's assault, while Han Myŏngnyŏn's vanguard was annihilated by the forces of Nam Ihong and Yi Suil.

=== Merit and aftercare ===
For his merit in suppressing Yi Kwal's rebellion, Yi Suil was invested as a Second-rank Chinmu Merit Subject (진무공신; 振武功臣) and ennobled as Great Lord of Kyerim.

In the 3rd month of 1624 he returned to office as Provincial Military Commander of Pyongan. As both the starting ground of Yi Kwal's revolt and a frontier against Nurhaci's invasions, Pyongan Province Province required particular vigilance. Yi Suil petitioned royal approval to issue certificates of pardon for those who had been involuntarily swept into Yi Kwal's rebellion and branded as traitors, and King Injo approved his request. However, in the 8th month of that year he was dismissed on the grounds that his northern defenses were insufficiently active.

=== Final years ===
In the 2nd month of 1625, Yi Suil was appointed Commander-in-Chief of the Naval Forces of the South (삼도수군통제사; 三都水軍統制使) while concurrently serving as Provincial Naval Commander of Right. In 1628 he was transferred to the post of Minister (판서; 判書) of Justice (형조; 刑曹). In the 7th month of 1631 he was entrusted with overseeing the repair works of Namhansanseong, and in the 9th month he was appointed Commander of the Defense of Namhansanseong (수어사; 守禦使).

In the 3rd month of 1632, at the age of seventy-nine, Yi Suil requested release from duty, and King Injo granted permission. One month after his retirement, Yi Suil died on the 27th day, 5th month of 1632 at his residence.
