= Pak Chin =

Korean general (1560–1597)

Duke Ŭiyŏl Pak Chin
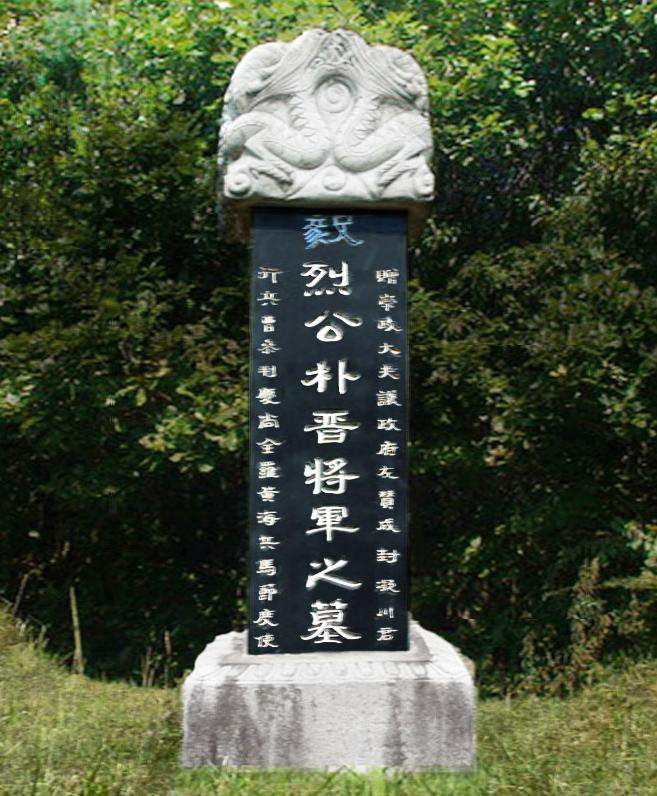
- Tomb of Pak Chin in Baekhak-myeon, Yeoncheon County
- Born: 25th day, 8th month of 1560; Miryang, Joseon
- Died: 30th day, 3rd month of 1597; Hwanghae Province, Joseon
- Burial place: Tomb of Pak Chin; Yeoncheon, South Korea
- Military career
- Allegiance: Joseon
- Conflicts: Imjin War; Battle of Sosan; Battle of Miryang; Siege of Yeongcheon; 2nd Siege of Gyeongju; 3rd Siege of Gyeongju
- Awards: 3rd Wisŏng Merit Subjects (Note: The Wisŏng Merit Subjects were deprived following the King Injo Restoration.)

Korean name
- Hangul: 박진
- Hanja: 朴晉
- RR: Bak Jin
- MR: Pak Chin

Royal title
- Hangul: 응천군
- Hanja: 凝川君
- RR: Eungcheongun
- MR: Ŭngch'ŏn'gun

Courtesy name
- Hangul: 명부, 여회
- Hanja: 明夫, 汝晦
- RR: Myeongbu, Yeohoe
- MR: Myŏngbu, Yŏhoe

Posthumous name
- Hangul: 의열
- Hanja: 毅毅
- RR: Uiyeol
- MR: Ŭiyŏl

Pak Chin (Korean: 박진; Hanja: 朴晉, 25th day, 8th month of 1560 – 30th day, 3rd month of 1597) was a Korean military leader of the mid-Joseon period. He was best known for his service during the Imjin War, particularly as Army Commander of Left Gyeongsang Province, where he oversaw the reorganization of provincial defenses and led campaigns to recover territory from Japanese forces.

Born in 1560 in Miryang, Pak came from a military family and entered official service through special recommendation. After passing the military examination in 1584, he held various posts before being appointed magistrate of Miryang in 1592, shortly before the outbreak of the Imjin War. During the initial Japanese advance, he participated in defensive actions at Sosan and Miryang and was subsequently promoted to Army Commander of Left Gyeongsang Province.

From mid-1592 onward, Pak directed efforts to rebuild command structures in Left Gyeongsang Province. Operating from Andong and Angang, he coordinated regular troops and righteous armies, supported operations to recapture Yeongcheon, and participated in subsequent campaigns to retake Gyeongju. He later served in additional regional commands, including Right Gyeongsang Province, Jeolla Province, and Hwanghae Province.

Pak died in 1597 from injuries sustained during the war and in an assault by a Ming general. Although initially excluded from the list of Sŏnmu Merit Subjects, he was posthumously enrolled in 1613 as a third-class Wisŏng Merit Subjects and granted the title of Prince Ŭngch'ŏn. His tomb in Yeoncheon, Gyeonggi Province, is designated as a Provincial Monument.

== Early life ==
Pak Chin was born on the 25th day, 8th month of 1560 in Miryang, Gyeongsang Province, Joseon. He belonged to the Miryang Pak clan; His father, Pak Insu (박인수; 朴麟壽), served during the reign of King Myeongjong as Naval Commander (수군절도사; 水軍節度使) and Army Commander (병마절도사; 兵馬節度使) of Right Gyeongsang Province, among other posts. His mother was a daughter of Kim Chadal (김자달; 金自達) of the Gangneung Kim clan.

Coming from a military family, Pak received an early appointment by special recommendation and was named Royal Messenger (선전관; 宣傳官). In 1584, while holding the junior sixth rank, he sat for the special military service examination (별시무과; 別試武科) and placed 68th with third-tier honors (병과; 丙科).

In 1589, when the Border Defense Council recruited military officials without regard to regular appointment procedures, Pak was recommended by Sim Sugyŏng, then Minister of War, and was appointed accordingly. He subsequently served as Vice Director (부정; 副正) at the Office of Military Training before being appointed Magistrate of Miryang in 1592.

== Imjin War ==
=== Outbreak of the Imjin War ===
On the 13th day, 4th month of 1592, Japanese forces appeared off the coast of Busan, marking the outbreak of the Imjin War. The following day, they captured Busanjinseong and subsequently attacked the fortress Dadaeposeong and Dongnaeeupseong in succession. Upon receiving news of the invasion, the Governor (관찰사; 觀察使) of Gyeongsang Province, Kim Su, immediately issued a mobilization order throughout the province.

At the time, Pak Chin was serving as Magistrate of Miryang and led the local troops toward Dongnaeeupseong in accordance with the order. However, on the evening of the 15th day, 4th month of 1592, while en route, he learned that Dongnaeeupseong had fallen. He therefore withdrew and joined Yi Kak, the Army Commander of Left Gyeongsang Province, who had established a defensive position at Sosan Post Station (소산역; 蘇山驛) after retreating from Dongnae.

Sosan Post Station occupied rugged terrain advantageous for defense and controlled access to the Great Yeongnam Road beyond Dongnae. Pak Chin emphasized to Yi Kak that failure to hold Sosan would result in the collapse of the Yeongnam defensive line and requested reinforcement from the rear. Accordingly, a defensive formation was established in which Pak Chin led approximately 500 troops at the front while Yi Kak's forces provided support from the rear. After fighting commenced on the evening of the 15th day, 4th month of 1592, the tide gradually turned against Pak Chin's forces, prompting Yi Kak to retreat to Eonyang. With rear support cut off, Pak Chin also withdrew, passing through Yangsan before retreating to Miryang.

=== Battle of Miryang ===
On the 16th day, 4th month of 1592, Pak Chin gathered the scattered remnants of his defeated troops and reorganized his forces, seeking to block the northward advance of the Japanese army in the vicinity of Chagwŏn (작원; 鵲院). Chagwŏn was a strategic point situated at the terminus of the Chakch'ŏn gallery road, beyond the Hwangsan gallery road between Yangsan and Miryang, and contained both a checkpoint and a postal station. Pak Chin deployed his troops near Chagwŏn'gwan and devised a defensive plan to impede the Japanese advance using the narrow cliff road.

When the vanguard of the Japanese First Division led by Konishi Yukinaga was blocked by Joseon forces along the cliff road, the follow-up force led by Matsura Shigenobu attempted to outflank the position by ascending Mount Kŭmbyŏngsan (금병산; 金屛山) and cutting off the rear of Pak Chin's unit. Upon recognizing this maneuver, Pak Chin dispatched his military officers Yi Taesu (이대수; 李大樹) and Kim Hyou (김효우; 金孝友) to Mount Kŭmbyŏngsan to intercept the enemy, but all of their troops were killed in battle after being overpowered.

Following the engagements, the Joseon forces were encircled at Chagwŏn, and Pak Chin withdrew toward Miryang. After setting fire to the government offices, arsenal, and grain stores of Miryang, he broke through the Japanese encirclement and retreated toward Yeongsan. The Japanese First Division subsequently occupied Miryang on the 18th day, 4th month of 1592. Meanwhile, the Japanese Second Division captured Gyeongju on the 21st day, 4th month of 1592, and advanced to occupy Yeoncheon on the 23rd day, 4th month of 1592.

After the Battle of Miryang, Pak Chin executed Confucian scholars of Eonyang who had attempted to collaborate with the Japanese forces, gathered intelligence on Japanese movements under the command of Kim Su, and joined the loyalist forces of Gyeongsang Province.

=== Appointment as Provincial Army Commander ===
On the 6th day, 5th month of 1592, Yun Tusu recommended Pak Chin and Kim Sŏngil to King Seonjo as suitable candidates for the post of Army Commander. On the 10th day, 5th month of 1592, the Royal Messenger Min Chongsin (민종신; 閔宗信) likewise reported that the defeat might have been avoided had Yi Kak and Yu Sungin cooperated effectively. Following such defenses, he was promoted to Army Commander of Left Gyeongsang Province.

In the latter half of the 5th month of 1592, Pak Chin was appointed Army Commander of Left Gyeongsang Province upon reaching Onyang with the loyalist forces of Gyeongsang Province. Historian Kim Jin-su assesses that the post of Army Commander of Left Gyeongsang Province at that time constituted an exceptionally difficult assignment. Owing to the war, the military and administrative command structure in the province had collapsed, and the number of troops Pak Chin could effectively command was no more than fifty. Moreover, because his predecessor Yi Kak had lost the official seal while abandoning the military camp, the legitimacy of his orders was called into question, creating further obstacles to the consolidation of command authority.

In the middle of the 6th month of 1592, Pak Chin crossed the Nakdong River at night with some thirty military officers, thereby entering Left Gyeongsang Province. At the same time, he announced his intention to proceed to Andong and ordered the magistrates of each locality to deploy ambush units and report on the military situation. At Punggak (풍각; 豊角), he gathered scattered civilians and secured approximately five hundred troops, then advanced northward toward Andong. Upon arriving at Sinnyŏng, he appointed Kwŏn Ŭngsu as Auxiliary Defense Officer (조방장; 助防將). In Cheongsong, he received the official seal from Han Hyosun, Magistrate of Yŏnghae, thereby establishing the legitimacy necessary for issuing commands. Thereafter, passing through Cheongsong, he reached Chinbo on the 5th day, 7th month of 1592.

After consolidating his forces in the Chinbo and Cheongsong areas, Pak Chin drove out the Japanese troops occupying Andong. He entered Andong on the 19th day, 7th month of 1592, and was granted military authority by the Regional Inspector (안집사; 安集使) Kim Rŭk. At Kim's recommendation, he established the Military Headquarters of Left Gyeongsang Province there. Thereafter, he stationed elite troops in Andong, repelled renewed Japanese incursions using artillery, and deployed forces along key routes in preparation for Japanese units advancing southward from the Kangwŏn Province region.

=== Siege of Yeongcheon ===
With the entry of Ming forces into the war, the Joseon court ordered southern regional troops to intercept Japanese forces. In response, Pak Chin relocated the Military Headquarters at Angang, which was situated between Yeongcheon and Gyeongju in the middle of the 7th month. He also issued orders to Kwŏn Ŭngsu, directing him to raise troops. Kwŏn Ŭngsu integrated righteous armies from Sinnyŏng, Yeongcheon, Chain, and Ŭihŭng, organizing them into a consolidated volunteer force. On the 24th day, 7th month of 1592, he prepared for an assault on the fortress Yeongcheonseong.

After receiving Kwŏn Ŭngsu's plan, Pak Chin supplied gunpowder and military equipment through his officer Pyŏn Ŭnggyu (변응규; 邊應圭) to support the volunteer forces. At dawn on the 26th day, 7th month of 1592, Joseon forces launched their attack on Yeongcheonseong, and on the 28th day they recaptured the stronghold.

=== Siege of Gyeongju ===
After recapturing Yeongcheon, Pak Chin sought to capitalize on the momentum by planning an operation to retake Gyeongju. He assembled the righteous armies of Left Gyeongsang Province and regular troops at Angang, and toured Cheongsong, Andŏk (안덕; 安德), and Yeongcheon to rally dispersed soldiers and civilians, thereby consolidating additional manpower. After completing a military inspection at Angang on the 20th day, 8th month of 1592, Pak Chin set out at approximately 11 p.m. that same night. He placed Pak Ŭijang and Kwŏn Ŭngsu at the vanguard and led a force of roughly ten thousand troops toward Gyeongju. Although the march was carried out under harsh conditions, with the troops unable even to take proper meals, it is recorded that the soldiers were filled with confidence, buoyed by their recent victory at Yeongcheon.

Pak Chin's army reached the gates of Gyeongjueupseong at dawn on the 21st day, 8th month of 1592. He established his command post at Kŭmjangdae Pavilion (금장대; 金藏臺), situated on a cliff across the stream Seocheon (서천; 西川) overlooking the fortress, and personally directed operations on site. In preparation for the siege, Pak Chin devised a plan to fill the moat surrounding the fortress by stuffing straw mats with grass and rice straw, while simultaneously employing incendiary tactics. He encircled the fortress on three sides—east, west, and north—assigning Pak Ŭijang to command the righteous armies on the eastern flank and Kwŏn Ŭngsu to command those on the western flank.

The attack commenced with the burning of houses as a signal. In the early phase of the battle, Japanese forces were heavily pressed by Joseon forces and retreated into the fortress. The Joseon forces reportedly killed approximately one thousand enemy troops. Around noon, however, Japanese reinforcements arriving from Eonyang lay in ambush in the vicinity of Baengnyulsa Temple (백률사; 栢栗寺) and the local Confucian school. They then launched a surprise attack against the rear of the Joseon forces, initiating a pincer movement. At the same time, the Japanese troops inside the fortress mounted a counteroffensive. Joseon forces continued fighting in the area of Kyeyŏn (계연; 鷄淵) between Gyeongjueupseong and Seocheon, but after sustaining heavy casualties, they crossed the river and withdrew to Angang.

Stationed at Angang, Pak Chin adopted a strategy of isolating Gyeongjueupseong through nighttime artillery bombardments and the deployment of ambush units along key routes to block Japanese reinforcements. Meanwhile, he proceeded to Donghwasa in Daegu to meet Kim Sŏngil, who had newly assumed office as Governor of Left Gyeongsang Province. During his absence, Pak Chin delegated operational command of the campaign to retake Gyeongju to Pak Ŭijang. Pak Ŭijang organized a corps of approximately one thousand selected troops and launched assaults employing Pigyŏk chinch'ŏlloe (time-fused explosive shells). He succeeded in recapturing Gyeongju on the 8th day, 9th month of 1592.

=== Later activities ===
After the recapture of Gyeongju, Pak Chin toured the areas of Yecheon and Andong in preparation for further Japanese incursions. In the course of these inspections, he met with righteous army leaders in various localities to discuss support for volunteer forces and plans for offensive operations against the Japanese. He reinforced logistical capacity by supplying bamboo for arrow production, dispatching musketeers, and providing gunpowder to volunteer units.

On the 6th day, 1st month of 1593, Pak Chin conferred with Han Hyosun, Governor of Left Gyeongsang Province, and the righteous army leader Kim Hae (김해; 金垓). They agreed to attack Japanese forces in the areas of Indong, Daegu, and Sangju. Engagements on the 6th day and 9th day, 1st month of 1593 did not yield significant results. However, on the 21st day, 1st month of 1593, Pak Chin's troops attacked and encircled the Japanese forces at Indong, successfully forcing the remaining enemy troops to retreat toward Daegu. During the course of these battles, Pak Chin was struck by a Japanese bullet, and his health deteriorated. He subsequently petitioned the court for dismissal from his post. Accordingly, he was reassigned as Second Deputy Director (동지사; 同知事) of the Privy Council, and Kwŏn Ŭngsu was appointed as his successor as Army Commander of Left Gyeongsang Province.

On the 10th day, 4th month of 1593, Pak Chin appeared at the temporary royal court. On the 20th day of the same month, by royal command, he conferred with the Ming general Liu Ting (劉綎) on matters of military administration. During this period, he also gathered intelligence on the situation in the capital and the movements of Ming forces, reporting his findings to King Seonjo. After the Japanese army withdrew from Hansŏng and redeployed to the Gyeongsang region, Pak Chin was appointed Commissioner for the Suppression of Bandits (독포사; 督捕使) and was dispatched once again to Gyeongsang Province. He was stationed at Miryang together with Kim Ŭngsŏ, Chŏng Hŭihyŏn (정희현; 鄭希玄), and Yi Siŏn, where they monitored Japanese movements.

In the 11th month of 1593, he reentered the court as Second Deputy Director and reported the military achievements of volunteer commanders and local officials in Left Gyeongsang Province. In the 12th month of 1593, he served as Commander of the Royal Guard (호위대장; 扈衛大將) under the Office of Military Pacification (무군사; 撫軍司) and was responsible for escorting Crown Prince Gwanghae. He subsequently served as Army Commander of Right Gyeongsang Province in 1594 and as Army Commander of Jeolla Province in 1595. In 1596, amid signs of a renewed Japanese invasion, Pak Chin's health deteriorated as a result of wounds sustained during his tenure as Army Commander of Left Gyeongsang Province. On the 6th day, 11th month of 1596, he was concurrently appointed Army Commander of Hwanghae Province and Magistrate of Hwangju in the northern region.

=== Death ===
In the 2nd month of 1597, while stationed in Hwanghae Province, Pak Chin's illness worsened to the point that he could no longer perform his official duties, and even military training had to be suspended. Amid these circumstances, he was assaulted by the Ming general Lou Chengxian (婁承先), sustaining severe injuries including a fractured sternum. Pak Chin died on the 30th day, 3rd month of 1597 at the age of thirty-eight.

== Legacy ==
=== Posthumous titles ===
News of Pak Chin's death was formally conveyed to the court on the 29th day, 5th month of 1597, when Yun Kyŏngnip (윤경립; 尹敬立) reported the matter during a royal lecture. In response, the court granted royal stipends to his mother for her support.

After the war, in the 4th month of 1603, the Office of Meritorious Subjects (공신도감; 功臣都監) proposed the selection of Sŏnmu Merit Subjects in recognition of distinguished service during the Imjin War from among 26 candidates, including Pak Chin. King Seonjo favored restricting the number of investitures to a few central figures, including Yi Sun-sin, Wŏn Kyun, Kwŏn Yul, and Ko Ŏnbaek. Court officials, however, argued that meritorious military commanders should be rewarded in order to encourage loyalty and valor in the event of future conflicts.

During this deliberative process, the list of candidates was revised multiple times. Pak Chin was among the final individuals personally named by King Seonjo, together with Yi Siŏn. The Office of Meritorious Subjects, however, objected that many commanders had rendered distinguished service and that the two should not be singled out for special recognition. Pak Chin was consequently excluded from the final list.

In the 5th month of 1612, Pak Suhyŏng (박수형; 朴隨亨), the son of Pak Chin, submitted a memorial requesting formal recognition of his father's meritorious service during the Imjin War, asserting that it had not been properly acknowledged. In response, King Gwanghaegun ordered the relevant office to review Pak Chin's case. In the following year, officials who had escorted Gwanghaegun during the Imjin War were invested as Wisŏng Merit Subjects. Pak Chin was posthumously enrolled as a third-class Wisŏng Merit Subject and ennobled as Prince Ŭngch'ŏn (응천군; 凝川君). However, following the Injo Restoration of 1623, the Wisŏng Merit Subjects were stripped of their status.

Pak Chin was later posthumously promoted to the office of Left Associate State Councilor (좌찬성; 左贊成), and in 1736, during the reign of King Yeongjo, he was granted the posthumous title Ŭiyŏl (의열; 懿烈).

=== Tomb ===
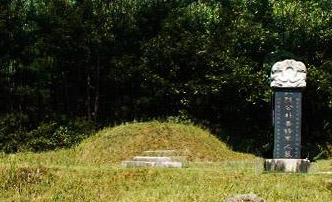
Pak Jin's grave in Yeoncheon

The Tomb of Pak Chin is located within the Civilian Control Zone in Baekhak-myeon, Yeoncheon County, Gyeonggi Province. Within the burial precinct, only the stone pedestal that once supported the original stele remains in front of the burial mound. The present stele, erected in 1987, stands beside it.

On 12 February 1987, the tomb was designated as a Monument of Gyeonggi Province.

=== Assessments ===
Assessments of Pak Chin are divided into positive and negative perspectives.

Regarding Pak Chin's defeat in the early phase of the Imjin War, Yi Sugwang offered a critical assessment, arguing that Pak Chin had used the defense of the gallery road as a pretext to abandon the fortress and retreat. In contrast, a historiographer of the Veritable Records of King Seonjo appraised him as a figure of exceptional loyalty and righteous resolve, noting that while officials of various districts fled and went into hiding, Pak Chin alone led his troops in an attempt to block the invading enemy. In addition, Yi Hangbok evaluated Pak Chin's conduct at Miryang positively. Although he acknowledged that Pak Chin suffered defeat and was forced to withdraw, he emphasized that even in defeat Pak displayed the bearing and spirit of a commander. Yi further observed that Pak regrouped the provincial commanders and troops and reorganized the camp, restored morale, and reawakened among the populace a sense of the necessity of resisting the enemy.

After the recapture of Yeongcheon and Gyeongju, court officials assessed that, in his capacity as Army Commander of Left Gyeongsang Province, his achievements were comparable to those of Yi Sun-sin in terms of military merit. However, there were also negative evaluations concerning his conflicts with local righteous army leaders, with some criticizing him for attempting to suppress the righteous armies. In this connection, Kim Sŏngil pointed out problems in Pak Chin's method of commanding the righteous army leaders of Left Gyeongsang Province. He met Pak Chin at Donghwasa Temple and advised him to pursue reconciliation with the righteous commanders on the basis of mutual respect and personal trust.

Meanwhile, the modern historian Choi Hyosik has argued that although Pak Chin was stationed at Andong, he reported to the court as if the recapture of Yeongcheon had been accomplished entirely under his own command, thereby appropriating the achievements of the Yeongcheon righteous army. By contrast, historian Kim Jin-su contends that Pak Chin's relationship with the righteous forces was not uniformly antagonistic. He notes that Kwŏn Ŭngsu himself offered a positive assessment of Pak Chin, suggesting a more complex dynamic than simple conflict. Kim further points out that Pak Chin supplied Kwŏn Ŭngsu's unit with military provisions and formally reported their battlefield achievements to the court, which led to the promotions of Kwŏn Ŭngsu and Chŏng Taeim. On this basis, he interprets the relationship between the regular army and the righteous forces as having developed into a functional system of cooperation, one that enabled the recovery of key areas in Left Gyeongsang Province.
