= Ko Ŏnbaek =

Korean general (1545–1608)

Prince Chehŭng Ko Ŏnbaek
- Born: 1545; Kyodong, Joseon
- Died: 1608 (aged 62–63); Joseon
- Cause of death: Execution
- Burial place: Ganghwa, South Korea
- Military career
- Allegiance: Joseon
- Conflicts: Imjin War; 1st Siege of Pyongyang; Battle of Byeokjegwan; Battle of Nowŏnp'yŏng; 4th Siege of Gyeongju; Battle of Angang; 1st Siege of Ulsan
- Awards: 3rd Sŏnmu Merit Subject

Korean name
- Hangul: 고언백
- Hanja: 高言伯
- RR: Go Eonbaek
- MR: Ko Ŏnbaek

Art name
- Hangul: 해장
- Hanja: 海藏
- RR: Haejang
- MR: Haejang

Courtesy name
- Hangul: 국필
- Hanja: 國弼
- RR: Gukpil
- MR: Kukp'il

Ko Ŏnbaek (Korean: 고언백; Hanja: 高彦伯; 1545 – 1608) was a Korean military leader of the mid-Joseon period, noted for defending the royal tombs north of the capital during the Imjin War. Born in Kyodong into the Cheju Ko clan, he passed the military service examination and began service on the northern frontier, later holding commands and accompanying missions to Beijing.

With the outbreak of the Imjin War in 1592, he was assigned to the Pyongyang front, where he led a river crossing attack during the siege of the city. He was soon appointed magistrate of Yangju, where he raised local forces, fortified Buramsan Fortress to protect nearby royal tombs, and in 1593 ambushed and repelled a Japanese detachment north of Hansŏng in the Battle of Nowŏnp'yŏng.

Recognized for these achievements, Ko was promoted to Provincial Military Commander of Left Gyeongsang. From Gyeongju he coordinated with Ming generals in defending the region, repelling Japanese attacks, and later acted as intermediary in secret peace talks between Katō Kiyomasa and the monk-official Yujŏng at Sŏsaengp'o, while continuing to direct local raids and defensive operations.

During the Chŏngyu War he again held senior commands in Gyeongsang, joined the unsuccessful siege of Ulsan, and took part in later engagements. In 1604 he was made a Third-rank Sŏnmu Meritorious Subject and Prince of Chehŭng for his wartime service, but in 1608 he was implicated in Prince Imhae's treason case and executed by flogging after King Gwanghaegun's accession.

== Early life and career ==
Ko Ŏnbaek was born in 1545 in Kyodong, Ganghwa. He was a member of the Cheju Ko clan; his father was either Ko Ch'unbang (고춘방; 高春邦) or Ko Yunbang (고윤방; 高允邦). He was born into a hereditary family of local officials that had long served as functionaries in Kyodong.

In 1576, Ko passed the military service examination as a local functionary in Kyodong. In 1587, he was appointed Military Frontier Commander (변장; 邊將) and served as a Military Officer (군관; 軍官) under the Provincial Military Commanders (병마절도사; 兵馬節度使) of North Hamgyŏng and P'yŏngan Provinces. Together with junior ninth-rank military officer (권관; 權管) Yi Myŏngjŏng (이명정; 李明貞), he pursued Jurchen raiders on the northern frontier, and alongside Commander Wŏn Kwan (원관; 元瓘), he defended against incursions by the Jurchens in the region beyond Mount Paektu.

Afterward, he was appointed Subarea Commander (만호; 萬戶) of Ch'ŏngsŏng (청성; 靑城) and Recorder (주부; 主簿) at the Directorate of the Palace Buildings (선공감; 繕工監). He also accompanied diplomatic missions to Beijing on eight occasions.

== Imjin War ==
=== Outbreak of the Imjin War ===
When the Imjin War broke out in the 4th lunar month of 1592, Ko Ŏnbaek marched south as a vanguard commander (척후장; 斥候將) under Sin Rip. However, after Sin's forces were defeated at Chungju, Ko regrouped the remnants of his troops in the area between Yangju and Yeoncheon and took up a defensive position at Taet'an (대탄; 大灘) on the Imjin River.

=== Battle of Pyongyang ===
When King Seonjo fled to Pyongyang in the 5th lunar month of 1592 and then departed again on the 11th day, 6th lunar month of 1592, the city's defense was left to Yun Tusu, Yi Wŏnik, and several local magistrates. Around this time, Ko Ŏnbaek was appointed Magistrate of Nyongwon and was assigned to the Pyongyang front. Yun Tusu, Yi Wŏnik, and Kim Myŏngwon devised a plan to launch a surprise attack across the Taedong River on the Japanese forces encamped on the opposite bank and entrusted Ko with its execution. On the morning of the 14th day, 6th lunar month of 1592, Ko led approximately 400 men across the river via Rŭngrado Island and launched a surprise assault on the camp of Sō Yoshitoshi, inflicting heavy casualties, including the death of the Japanese commander Sugimura Tomokiyo (杉村智清), and breaking through to the enemy's second line. However, with the arrival of Japanese reinforcements, Ko's troops were forced to withdraw, and the Pyongyang garrison also abandoned the fortress under pressure from Japanese troops crossing the river in pursuit.

=== Magistrate of Yangju ===
==== Defense of the royal tombs ====
On the 24th day, 7th lunar month of 1592, Ko Ŏnbaek petitioned to enter Yangju and raise troops to fight the Japanese. King Seonjo conferred upon him the senior third rank and appointed him Magistrate of Yangju, ordering him to defend the royal tombs. In Yangju, Ko recruited local troops, established mountain camps, and employed ambush tactics against Japanese detachments. He fortified the Mount Buramsan, or Kŏmamsan, the guardian mountain of Geonwolleung, King Taejo's tomb, and maintained hidden troops around the royal sites. In the 8th lunar month, Ko ambushed 600 Japanese soldiers raiding the T'owŏn (토원; 兎院) area, luring them into the mountains and killing 62 of them. Over the course of that month, he achieved victories in three separate engagements. For these successes, on the 9th day, 9th lunar month, Ko was promoted to the junior second rank of Grand Master for Excellent Virtue (가선대부; 嘉善大夫). His growing reputation prompted King Seonjo to consider assigning him to defend the royal temporary court at Ŭiju, though the proposal was opposed by the Border Defense Council.

On the 16th day, 12th lunar month of 1592, a group of about fifty Japanese soldiers and fifty Koreans collaborating with the Japanese attempted to desecrate the royal tombs in the Yangju area—King Myeongjong's Gangneung (강릉; 康陵), Queen Munjeong's T'aenŭng (태릉; 泰陵), and the tomb of Deokheung Daewongun. Discovering the plot, Ko led his troops in pursuit, ambushed the intruders, and repelled them, thus preventing the desecration. Because of his successful defense, the royal tombs of Geonwolleung and Gangneung were preserved intact. The court recognized his merits, promoting him to Grand Master for Admirable Righteousness (가의대부; 嘉義大夫) and concurrently appointing him Provincial Defense Commander (방어사; 防禦使) of Gyeonggi on the 27th day, 12th lunar month of 1592. His leadership won him the confidence of the people of Hansŏng and Yangju, who supported his operations, and he began planning a campaign to recapture the capital.

==== Battle of Byeokjegwan ====
In the 1st lunar month of 1593, the allied Ming and Joseon forces recaptured Pyongyang and entered Kaesŏng. On the 25th day of the 1st lunar month, Ko guided Ming General Zu Dashou across the Imjin River and advanced from Paju to Changneung for reconnaissance. There, they clashed with the Japanese vanguard under Katō Mitsuyasu and Maeno Nagayasu, killing more than sixty Japanese soldiers. At dawn on the 27th day of the 1st lunar month, Zu and Ko launched an attack in heavy fog against the vanguard of Tachibana Muneshige's subordinate, Totoki Tsurehisa (十時連久), positioned at Yŏsŏknyŏng Pass (여석령; 礪石嶺). However, the Japanese feigned retreat and lured the allied forces into an ambush, inflicting heavy casualties with musket fire and forcing a withdrawal. In the subsequent engagement, the Ming army was defeated and retreated as far as Pyongyang.

==== Battle of Nowŏnp'yŏng ====
As the Ming army withdrew toward Pyongyang, it advised the Joseon forces to do the same, but the Joseon command instead formulated plans to recapture the capital. Ko Ŏnbaek stationed about 2,000 troops near Yangju. Under orders from Yu Sŏngnyong, Ko, together with Yi Siŏn, Chŏng Hŭihyŏn (정희현; 鄭希玄(賢)), and Pak Myŏnghyŏn (박명현; 朴名賢), blocked the Haeyuryŏng Pass (해유령; 蟹踰嶺) to prevent another Japanese retaliatory advance after the Battle of Haengju.

When Japanese forces in Hansŏng began pillaging the northern outskirts due to supply shortages, Ko and Yi Siŏn positioned their troops at the fortress of Buramsansŏng on the 25th day of the 3rd lunar month, setting ambushes around Nowŏnp'yŏng (노원평; 蘆原坪) and Mount Samgaksan. Before sunrise on the 26th day, Ko led his troops in a surprise guerrilla attack on Japanese raiding parties, driving them back. Reinforcements under Yi Pin (이빈; 李薲) and Yujŏng joined the assault, inflicting further losses on the Japanese, and Ko pursued the retreating enemy, killing more than forty.

The following day, the Japanese appeared near Mount Suraksan. Ko and Yujŏng occupied high ground and fought back with volleys of arrows, inflicting many casualties. However, outnumbered by the Japanese, Ko's troops could not pursue the retreating enemy. For his role in driving the Japanese from the northern outskirts of Seoul and contributing to the eventual recapture of the capital, Ko Ŏnbaek was promoted to Provincial Military Commander of Left Gyeongsang.

=== Provincial military commander of Left Gyeongsang ===
==== Defense of Gyeongju and Angang ====
After his appointment as Provincial Military Commander of Left Gyeongsang, Ko Ŏnbaek relocated the Military Headquarters of Left Gyeongsang from Angang to the walled town of Gyeongju. In the early 8th lunar month of 1593, the Japanese invasion of Gyeongju was part of a broader strategy formed part of a broader strategy to cover the southward retreat of the Japanese army. The Ming army also began stationing troops in Gyeongju, while Joseon commanders such as Pak Ŭijang, Kwŏn Ŭngsu, Hong Kyenam, and Yi Suil remained there to defend the region against renewed Japanese incursions.

On the 6th day, 8th lunar month of 1593, several thousand Japanese troops invaded Gyeongju. In the ensuing battle, the Ming generals Wu Weizhong and Luo Shangzhi were credited with playing a decisive role in repelling the invaders, forcing the Japanese to retreat to Sŏsaengp'o. Nevertheless, the allied Ming–Joseon forces suffered heavy casualties, with more than 500 soldiers killed.

On the 3rd day, 11th lunar month of 1593, the Japanese attacked again in three divisions. Ko Ŏnbaek joined forces with Pak Ŭijang and led Joseon troops to meet them in battle. The Ming troops stationed in Gyeongju initially refused to engage, claiming they were outnumbered, and only later joined the fighting. The combined forces were defeated, suffering about 200 casualties. On the 2nd day, 12th lunar month, the Japanese once again invaded Angang in three columns. Ko Ŏnbaek, again accompanied by Pak Ŭijang, led a picked force to counterattack, while Ming generals Wu Weizhong, Wang Bidi, and Luo Shangzhi quickly mobilized their own select troops after conferring. Ko's contingent spearheaded the assault, breaking through the Japanese main force and forcing it to retreat. Taking advantage of nightfall, the enemy fled back to Sŏsaengp'o.

==== Peace negotiations with Katō Kiyomasa ====
On the 21st day, 2nd lunar month of 1594, Katō Kiyomasa, seeking to distinguish himself in competition with Konishi Yukinaga by conducting independent peace negotiations, sent the captive Chŏng Yŏnbok to deliver a letter to Ko Ŏnbaek, who was then stationed in Gyeongju. The letter proposed talks on a possible peace settlement. After Ko Ŏnbaek consulted with Kwŏn Yul, the matter was reported to the Ming commander Liu Ting. During this process, the Ming court instructed the Joseon court to designate a suitable representative to negotiate with Katō. Because the Joseon government had previously adopted an official stance opposing peace negotiations with Japan, it sought to avoid accusations of violating discipline. Accordingly, all correspondence sent to Katō's camp was issued under Ko Ŏnbaek's name alone, and the discussions were conducted in strict secrecy.

The court organized a peace delegation headed by Yujŏng, while Ko Ŏnbaek, as Provincial Military Commander, served as an intermediary between Katō and Yujŏng and was responsible for reporting the progress of the negotiations at Sŏsaengp'o to the royal court. Two meetings were held at Sŏsaengp'o, on the 14th day, 4th lunar month, and the 12th day, 7th lunar month of 1594. In the 12th lunar month of the same year, Katō refused a third meeting after becoming disillusioned with Joseon's cautious attitude and learned of separate contacts between Kim Ŭngsŏ and Konishi Yukinaga. The Joseon government likewise abandoned direct negotiations with Katō and instead shifted toward a strategy of counterbalancing him through Konishi.

Amid these developments, on the 29th day, 2nd lunar month of 1595, Ko Ŏnbaek submitted a secret memorial to the throne outlining a plan to assassinate Katō Kiyomasa. According to his report, two Japanese soldiers who had defected—Chujilchi (주질지; 酒叱只) and Haksai (학사이; 鶴沙伊)—proposed a detailed scheme: they revealed Katō's travel routes, noting that he often moved with only a small escort, and planned an ambush in the mountains with the cooperation of an insider within Katō's camp named Korobi (고로비; 古老非). They also swore an oath in blood, pledging to carry out the assassination and to spread rumors afterward to induce the Japanese forces to retreat. After deliberation, however, the royal court dispatched a Royal Messenger (선전관; 宣傳官) to Ko Ŏnbaek, ordering him to abandon the plan. Obeying the directive, Ko sent word to Korobi instructing him to cancel the assassination attempt, explaining that a Ming envoy would soon arrive to resume peace negotiations.

==== Later campaigns and request for resignation ====
In the 2nd lunar month of 1594, Ko Ŏnbaek repelled Japanese raiding forces at Kubŏkgok (구법곡; 九法谷), and again in the 3rd lunar month at Imnangp'o. He continued to distinguish himself in combat, again defeating enemy troops at Eonyang in the 10th lunar month of 1595. On the 13th day, 9th lunar month of 1596, Ko submitted a memorial requesting dismissal from office, expressing concern for his aged mother, who was gravely ill. King Seonjo initially approved his resignation but, fearing for the security of the capital, ordered Ko to remain in the vicinity to assist in its defense.

=== Chŏngyu War ===
When the Chŏngyu War broke out in the 1st lunar month of 1597, Ko Ŏnbaek was concurrently appointed Provincial Defense Commander of Gyeongsang and Second Deputy Director (동지사; 同知事) of the Privy Council (중추부; 中樞府). In his initial reports to the court, he assessed the poor condition of Joseon's weaponry and the army's weakened combat readiness and requested that commendations and incentives be granted to the soldiers in order to restore.

Ko subsequently joined Sŏng Yunmun, Provincial Military Commander of Left Gyeongsang, and Kwŏn Ŭngsu, Provincial Defense Commander, in garrisoning Gyeongju to block the Japanese advance through Choryŏng Pass. By late 7th lunar month, Japanese forces instead concentrated at Miryang and advanced toward Jeolla Province, bypassing Gyeongju. Nonetheless, Japanese troops stationed at Sŏsaengp'o frequently raided the Gyeongju area. On the 27th day, 11th lunar month, the Japanese temporarily occupied Gyeongju Fortress, but Ko and his allied forces counterattacked and recaptured the city five days later, on the 2nd day, 12th lunar month.

On the 21st day, 12th lunar month, Ming generals Yang Hao and Ma Gui arrived in Gyeongju and joined forces with Kwŏn Yul. The next day, the allied Ming–Joseon army launched an assault on Ulsan Castle, in which Ko Ŏnbaek participated alongside Kwŏn Yul and Chŏng Kiryong. The allies attacked continuously for thirteen days, until the 4th day, 1st lunar month of 1598, but failed to capture the fortress and withdrew after suffering heavy casualties. On the 5th day, 1st lunar month, Ko and other Joseon commanders regrouped in Gyeongju to reassemble their scattered troops. Although the siege of Ulsan ended in failure, Ko later achieved success in the 2nd lunar month of 1598, when he and Sŏng Yunmun ambushed Japanese soldiers visiting the local shrine Seonangdang in Ulsan, killing thirteen Japanese soldiers.

== Final years ==
=== Merits ===
On the 25th day, 6th lunar month of 1604, the court rewarded those who had rendered distinguished service during the Imjin War. Although the Office of Meritorious Subjects (공신도감; 功臣都監) initially judged that Ko's accomplishments were not exceptionally distinguished, it acknowledged his many years of continuous service. King Seonjo, however, personally intervened, remarking that Ko's captures of Japanese soldiers and his protection of the royal tombs warranted inclusion in the honors list. Accordingly, Ko Ŏnbaek was invested as a Third-rank Sŏnmu Meritorious Subject for his defense of Geonwolleung while serving as Provincial Defense Commander of Gyeonggi during the Imjin War. He was also ennobled as Prince of Chehŭng (제흥; 濟興).

=== Death ===
In the 2nd lunar month of 1608, following King Gwanghaegun's accession, Ko was implicated in the treason case involving Prince Imhae and arrested. Ko testified that he had met the prince only once, in 1599, and that he had refused to procure a hwando (환도; 環刀; lit. 'ringed sword') that the prince had demanded, thereby incurring his anger and breaking off further contact; he therefore asserted that he was not among the prince's confidants. His defense, however, was rejected, and in 1608 he was put to death by flogging on the charge of being one of Prince Imhae's close associates.
