= Guryongsan =

Mountain in South Korea

Coordinates: 37°04′N 128°50′E

Highest point
- Elevation: 1,346 m (4,416 ft)

Geography
- Location: North Gyeongsang Province, South Korea

Korean name
- Hangul: 구룡산
- Hanja: 九龍山
- RR: Guryongsan
- MR: Kuryongsan

Guryongsan (Korean: 구룡산) is a mountain of North Gyeongsang Province, eastern South Korea. It has an elevation of 1,346 metres.

== See also ==
- List of mountains of Korea
