= Pak Ŭijang =

Korean military leader (1555–1615)

Duke Muŭi Pak Ŭijang
- 박의장
- Born: 1555; Yŏnghae, Joseon
- Died: 25th day of 1st month, 1615
- Burial place: Yeongdeok, South Korea
- Military career
- Allegiance: Joseon
- Conflicts: Imjin War; 1st Siege of Gyeongju; Siege of Yeongcheon; 2nd Siege of Gyeongju; 3rd Siege of Gyeongju; Battle of P'ajam

Korean name
- Hangul: 박의장
- Hanja: 朴毅長
- RR: Bak Uijang
- MR: Pak Ŭijang

Art name
- Hangul: 청신재
- Hanja: 淸愼齋
- RR: Cheongsinjae
- MR: Ch'ŏngsinjae

Courtesy name
- Hangul: 사강
- Hanja: 士剛
- RR: Sagang
- MR: Sagang

Posthumous name
- Hangul: 무의
- Hanja: 武毅
- RR: Muui
- MR: Muŭi

Pak Ŭijang (Korean: 박의장; Hanja: 朴毅長; 1555 – 25th day, 1st month of 1615) was a Korean military commander active during the mid-Joseon period. Born in 1555 in Yŏnghae, Gyeongsang Province, Pak Ŭijang passed the military service examination In 1577 and in 1587 was appointed Ch'ampong of the Government Arsenal, receiving his first regular government post. After serving in various positions, he became Executive Assistant to Magistrate of Gyeongju in 1591.

When the Imjin War broke out in the 4th month of 1592, Pak first proceeded to Dongnae but soon returned to Gyeongju, where he took part in the fortess's defense; overwhelmed by superior numbers, however, he was forced to retreat. Regrouping his forces, he joined the Siege of Yeongcheon and subsequently fought in the Siege of Gyeongju. Although the first attempt to retake the fortress failed, in the second he personally led his troops, employing guerrilla tactics and incendiary operations to achieve success.

The following year he repelled Japanese forces at P'ajam and Ulsan, after which he was appointed Mayor of Gyeongju. In that role he devoted himself both to relief for the populace and to military operations, winning distinction in several engagements. When the Chŏngyu War broke out in 1597, Pak continued to secure victories at Yeongcheon, Angang, and Madŭngo, later serving under Ming and Joseon commanders in joint operations. Although the failed siege of Ulsan forced his withdrawal, he returned to fortify Gyeongju and contributed vital provisions.

After the war he held offices including Magistrate of Seongju and Provincial Military Commander of Left Gyeongsang, before dying in 1615 while serving as Provincial Naval Commander of Gyeongsang. Pak was posthumously promoted to Minister of Taxation and was conferred the posthumous title Muŭi. He was also enshrined at Chŏngchungsa in Yŏnghae and at Kubong Chŏngsa.

== Early life ==
=== Birth and education ===
Pak Ŭijang was born in 1555 as the eldest son at Wŏn'gori (원고리; 元皐里) in Yŏnghae, Joseon. He belonged to the Muan Pak clan; his father, Pak Seryŏm (박세렴; 朴世廉), served as Magistrate of Yŏngil, and held other official posts, while his mother, Lady Nam of the Yeongyang Nam clan, daughter of Nam Sijun (남시준; 南時俊). His younger brother, Pak Hongjang, born in 1558, was dispatched to Japan during the Imjin War.

In 1567, Pak Ŭijang, through the arrangements of his father, Pak Seryŏm, and his uncle, Pak Sehyŏn (박세현; 朴世賢), commenced studies under Kim Ŏn'gi (김언기; 金彦璣), a disciple of Yi Hwang. He studied alongside Kwŏn Wi (권위; 權暐) and Sin Chije (신지제; 申之悌), focusing on the Confucian classics and historical texts while concurrently engaging with military treatises. In 1577, he passed the special military examination, receiving assessments from examiners that noted his proficiency in both scholarly and martial disciplines. Following his success in the examination, he continued scholarly exchanges with Kŭm Nansu (금난수; 琴蘭秀), also a disciple of Yi Hwang, indicating sustained involvement in academic activities.

=== Early career ===
Pak Ŭijang began his government service in 1579 with his appointment as Probationary Record Keeper (권지봉사; 權知奉事) at the Office of Military Training (훈련원; 訓鍊院). In 1587, he was appointed Ch'ampong (참봉; 參奉) of the Government Arsenal (군기시; 軍器寺), thereby entering a regular government post. The following year, he successively served as Assistant Record Keeper (부봉사; 副奉事), Record Keeper (봉사; 奉事), and Duty Chief (직장; 直長) within the same office. He was subsequently transferred to the position of Recorder (주부; 主簿) at the Granary of Official Emoulements (광흥창; 廣興倉), and later returned to serve as Recorder at the Government Arsenal. In the 12th month of 1588, he was appointed Magistrate of Chinhae, an external posting. In the 6th month of 1589, he concurrently held the position of Magistrate of Haman, and in 1591, he was appointed Executive Assistant to Magistrate (판관; 判官) of Gyeongju.

== Imjin War ==
=== Outbreak of the Imjin War ===
In the 4th month of 1592, at the outbreak of the Imjin War, Pak Ŭijang, upon receiving urgent reports, advanced with the troops of the Gyeongju Garrison to Dongnae in coordination with Yi Kak, Provincial Military Commander (병마절도사; 兵馬節度使) of Left Gyeongsang, as part of the initial mobilization. After the fall of Dongnae Fortress and the northward advance of the Japanese First Division under Konishi Yukinaga, Yi and Pak to retreated to Eonyang. When Yi subsequently sought to relocate from Eonyang to the Military Headquarter of Left Gyeongsang at Ulsan, Pak argued for continued resistance at Eonyang. However, with the approach of the Japanese Second Division under Katō Kiyomasa, Yi retreated to Ulsan and instructed Pak to return to Gyeongju Fortress to defend the Left Route of Gyeongsang Province.

Upon returning to Gyeongju, Pak Ŭijang found that the inhabitants had already dispersed. Shortly after his arrival, Yun Inham, the Magistrate of Gyeongju, transferred 500 soldiers under the command of Yi Kak to Pak and departed the fortress to assume the post of Fugitive Apprehension Commander (포망장; 捕亡將). Having thus obtained effective military authority, Pak, in coordination with Yi Suil, Magistrate of Changgi, undertook the defense of Gyeongju Fortress. When the vanguard of the Japanese Second Division approached, a large number of soldiers fled, and Pak's forces were overwhelmed and disintegrated under superior enemy strength. On the 21st day of the 4th month, Gyeongju Fortress was captured, prompting Pak to withdraw toward Kigye. Although advised by some to proceed to the royal court in temporary exile, Pak chose to remain in Gyeongju and began preparations for a recapture operation based in Jukjang.

=== Siege of Yeongcheon ===
From his base in Jukjang, Pak Ŭijang rallied dispersed civilians and soldiers, established a forge to manufacture arrows and other weapons, and reorganized his forces. He conducted guerrilla operations against the Japanese, securing victories at Ch'oje (초제; 草堤) and Chain. In the 7th month of 1592, he received a request for military assistance from the Righteous army leader Kwŏn Ŭngsu for the recapture of Yeongcheon Fortress, and he joined Kwŏn's forces at the head of government troops.

On the 26th day of the 7th month, the Joseon army launched its assault on the fortress. As night fell, the force divided into two main contingents, with Pak and Kwŏn commanding the northwestern sector. The following day, Pak concentrated his attack on the west and north gates, employing hand-to-hand combat and incendiary tactics, which resulted in the recapture of Yeongcheon Fortress. In recognition of his service in the operation, Pak was appointed Vice Director (부정; 副正) of the Directorate of the Palace Buildings (선공감; 繕工監).

=== Siege of Gyeongju ===
Following the successful recapture of Yeongcheon Fortress, the Joseon forces launched an operation to retake Gyeongju Fortress. The Provincial Military Commander of Left Gyeongsang, Pak Chin, directed the campaign, assembling government troops and righteous armies at Angang in Gyeongju, with Pak Ŭijang joining the force. On the 20th day of the 8th month, the Joseon army departed Angang and reached Gyeongju Fortress at dawn the following day. Establishing their command post on a cliff across the Seocheon River, they surrounded the fortress on its eastern, western, and northern sides, with Pak Ŭijang commanding the vanguard on the eastern front.

The assault began with the setting of fires to civilian houses outside the fortress as a signal to attack. In the ensuing protracted engagement, Japanese reinforcements concealed at Baengnyulsa Temple (백률사; 栢栗寺) and the local Confucian school joined the battle, surrounding the Joseon forces. Simultaneously, Japanese troops within the fortress opened the north gate and mounted a counterattack. The Joseon army was forced to withdraw across the Seocheon River to Angang, during which Pak Ŭijang sustained a shoulder wound.

Following the failed attempt to recapture Gyeongju Fortress, the Joseon forces regrouped at Angang on the 25th day of the 8th month, 1592. Provincial Military Commander Pak Chin proceeded to Daegu to meet with the newly appointed Governor of Left Gyeongsang, Kim Sŏngil, delegating military command to Pak Ŭijang. Abandoning large-scale frontal assaults, Pak adopted guerrilla tactics utilizing a forlorn hope. From among the government troops and local righteous armies, he selected approximately 1,000 men, including Kim Tŭkpok (김득복; 金得福), appointing Kim as Guard Commander (위장; 衛將), with Hwang Hŭian, Pak Ch'unmu (박춘무; 朴春茂) and others as Staff Officers (장좌; 將佐), while assuming the role of vanguard commander himself. He assigned the Left Provincial Army stationed at Angang to provide covering support, and positioned beacon guards in nearby mountains to light signal fires simultaneously, creating the impression of a large force.

On the 7th day of the 9th month, a concentrated engagement commenced. During the day, Pak Ŭijang led the forlorn hope in guerrilla warfare. At night, under the cover of the Left Provincial Army, he led the vanguard in executing incendiary operations. In particular, the Pigyŏk chinch'ŏlloe, a newly developed timed explosive weapon created by Yi Changson, was continuously launched into the fortress, inflicting considerable casualties and sowing confusion among the Japanese, who had never encountered such a weapon. Despite their disarray, the Japanese maintained a staunch defense, prolonging the battle into the following day. On the night of the 8th day of the 9th month, after fierce fighting, the Japanese forces withdrew to Sŏsaengp'o in Ulsan, and the Joseon army successfully recaptured Gyeongju Fortress.

Pak Ŭijang, while pursuing the fleeing Japanese forces with his elite troops, advanced into Gyeongju Fortress. There, he found the Chibgyŏngjŏn Hall—which had housed the royal portrait of King Taejo—collapsed, and the remaining structures reduced to ashes. Nevertheless, he secured over 40,000 sŏk of grain preserved in the storehouses. He further dispatched troops to block the routes to Eonyang and Ulsan, and to secure the road linking Yeongcheon and Sinnyŏng.

=== Battle of P'ajam ===
After the Ming–Joseon allied forces recaptured Pyongyang Fortress in the 1st month of 1593, the Ming court sought to bring the Imjin War to a close through peace negotiations with Japan. Against this backdrop, on the 10th day of the 3rd month, Pak Ŭijang led 300 troops into combat against roughly 2,000 Japanese soldiers at P'ajam (파잠; 巴岑) in Daegu. Following their defeat at Gyeongju, Japanese forces moved back and forth through Miryang and Cheongdo en route to Daegu. To cut off their passage, Pak lay in ambush at P'ajam and launched a surprise attack. Employing arquebuses which he had become proficient in through his exchanges with Kim Ch'ungsŏn, Pak achieved a decisive victory. In the 5th month of 1593, he subsequently joined Kim T'aehŏ (김태허; 金太虛), the Magistrate of Ulsan, in driving out Japanese forces stationed in Ulsan. For his meritorious service at the Battle of P'ajam, Pak was promoted to the senior third rank of Grand Master for Comprehensive Governance (통정대부; 通政大夫) and appointed Mayor of Gyeongju.

=== Mayoralty of Gyeongju ===
Pak Ŭijang procured over 40,000 sŏk of grain, which he used both to relieve famine-stricken civilians and to sustain military training in preparation for further conflict with the Japanese. He also implemented a system of hwan'gok, enabling displaced peasants to resume their livelihoods despite the devastation of the Imjin War. Militarily, he reorganized local forces into specialized units—suicide squads, supply corps, and peasant militias—allocating wartime duties according to the needs and conditions of the populace.

In the 8th month of 1593, as the threat of renewed Japanese incursions intensified, Ming forces were stationed in Gyeongju Fortress. On the 3rd day of the 11th month, when Japanese troops invaded Angang, Pak, together with Ko Ŏnbaek and Hong Kyenam, organized a defense. The engagement ended in defeat: over 220 Ming soldiers garrisoned at Angang were killed, and Pak, alongside Ko Ŏnbaek, was compelled to retreat. At that time, Ming generals Wu Weizhong and Luo Shangzhi, then stationed in Gyeongju, shut the fortress gates and avoided combat, which allowed the Japanese to plunder and massacre large numbers of civilians. However, on the 2nd day of the 12th month, when the Japanese mounted another assault on Angang, they were successfully repelled by the defenders led by Pak and Ko Ŏnbaek.

In the 12th month of 1593, Pak Ŭijang lost his father but, amid the turmoil of war, was unable even to attend his deathbed. The following year he continued to take the field, repelling Japanese forces in successive engagements—at Yangsan in the 2nd month, at Imnangp'o in Gijang in the 3rd month, again in Gijang in the 5th month, and east of Gyeongju in the 7th month of 1594. Yet the hardships grew severe: from 1593 onward famine and epidemic disease caused a sharp rise in casualties, while displaced peasants failed to return to their villages. The situation was further exacerbated by the corvée obligations imposed by the presence of Ming garrisons.

In 1594, he repeatedly petitioned to resign from his post as magistrate, but the people of Gyeongju submitted memorials requesting his retention in recognition of his effective administration. At the same time, rather than allow the Ming forces to evade combat under the pretext of peace negotiations, Pak took it upon himself to attack the Japanese directly, winning victories and securing spoils of war to safeguard the people of Gyeongju. Ultimately, in recognition of his service in defending Gyeongju, his official rank was elevated to Grand Master for Excellent Virtue (가선대부; 嘉善大夫) in the 10th month of 1595 and continued his post.

=== Chŏngyu War ===
In 1597, following the breakdown of peace negotiations between the Ming and the Japanese, the Chŏngyu War erupted. In the 8th month of that year, Pak Ŭijang met with Kwak Chaeu at Hwawangsansŏng to deliberate defensive measures, after which he selected elite troops to block the Japanese advance toward Gyeongju. As the conflict expanded and Ming reinforcements flooded into the region, however, the burden of corvée labor on the local populace intensified, compelling many peasants to flee. Pak stressed the need to foster disciplined, professional forces through the separation of soldiers from peasants, and he condemned the ruinous effects of scorched-earth tactics, which disregarded the survival of Gyeongju's inhabitants. He also submitted a memorial to the court, reporting the damage inflicted by the stationing of Ming troops.

Even under such straitened conditions, on the 29th day of the 9th month he defeated Japanese forces at Yeongcheon, and again on the 5th day of the 10th month at Angang, driving them back toward Ulsan. On the 5th day of the 11th month, under the command of Sŏng Yunmun, Provincial Military Commander of Left Gyeongsang, he joined Kim T'aehŏ in laying an ambush at Madŭngo (마등오; 馬等烏), where they won another victory. On the 10th day of the 11th month, the court reorganized the provincial forces into three camps, and Pak was assigned to the Second Camp under the joint command of Ming General Li Rumei and Sŏng Yunmun. In the 12th month, he participated in the allied Ming–Joseon campaign at the Battle of Tosan at Ulsan, but after the failure to seize the fortress, he withdrew to Gyeongju to continue its defense. In the 5th month of 1598, in recognition of his role in procuring 700 sŏk of military provisions, he was rewarded with a warhorse.

== Later life ==
After the Imjin War, in the 4th month of 1599, Pak Ŭijang was appointed Magistrate of Seongju and concurrently Defense Commander (방어사; 防禦使) of Left Gyeongsang Province. The following year, he was promoted to Provincial Military Commander of Left Gyeongsang. At this time, Pak Ŭijang also petitioned the court to replenish the troop quotas of each county, and further proposed that those of his subordinate generals holding senior court rank but remaining at headquarters be assigned to frontier defense. In 1607, he was dismissed from office following an impeachment raised by Pak Ijang (박이장; 朴而章), Magistrate of Yŏnghae.

=== Death ===
In 1608 he was reinstated as Provincial Military Commander of Left Gyeongsang. He subsequently served as Magistrate of Indong in 1611 and was appointed Provincial Naval Commander of Chungcheong in 1613. On the 25th day of the 1st month of 1615, while serving as Provincial Naval Commander of Gyeongsang, Pak died at the Naval Headquarter of Gyeongsang.
