= Kim Sŏngil (born 1538) =

Joseon scholar-official (1538–1593)

- Hangul: 김성일
- Hanja: 金誠一
- RR: Gim Seongil
- MR: Kim Sŏngil

Kim Sŏngil (Korean: 김성일; Hanja: 金誠一; 1538–1593) was a Joseon dynasty politician and ambassador. He was a member of the Eastern faction in the Joseon court. He served as envoy to Japan in a Tongsinsa, along with Ho Song and Hwang Yun-gil in 1590, and met with the Japanese regent, Toyotomi Hideyoshi. He died of disease during the Imjin War.

== Mission to Japan ==
In 1588, the Taiko of Japan, Toyotomi Hideyoshi, dispatched the Daimyo Sō Yoshitoshi on a diplomatic mission to the Joseon court. So carried a letter informing the Korean king, Seonjo, of Hideyoshi's intention to invade Ming China, and to march his armies through Korea on the way.

The Joseon officials decided to bring Japan into the Chinese tributary system by establishing diplomatic relations. Kim Sŏng-il was selected as vice-ambassador, along with Ambassador Hwang Yun-gil, from the Western faction, and fellow Easterner Ho Song as recording secretary.

In August 1590, The mission arrived in Kyoto. Hideyoshi did not receive the embassy until December, as he was conducting the Siege of Odawara. The audience did not follow Korean or Chinese diplomatic procedures; the expected feast was neglected, and Hideyoshi brought his one-year-old son into the hall in the middle of the proceedings. Kim found it offensive to appear before Hideyoshi at all, as he was a regent, not a king or an emperor.

Hideyoshi believed the embassy to have been a tribute mission to show Seoul would swear allegiance to Japan. He gave the ambassadors a letter thanking King Seonjo for "surrendering" to Japan, and telling him to use the Korean army to invade China when Hideyoshi ordered him to. The ambassadors, whose only intention was for Japan to become, like Korea, a tribute state of China, protested at the letter. Hideyoshi had the phrase "surrendering to the Japanese court" removed, but the rest of the letter stood unchanged.

== Return to Korea ==
Kim believed Hideyoshi's intentions towards Korea to be peaceful, and upon returning from Japan in 1591, he advocated that King Seonjo not take precautions against a Japanese invasion. The Westerner, Hwang Yun-gil, believed that Hideyoshi was a threat to Korea's national security. The Eastern faction at this time controlled the court, and did not begin any defensive preparations. Anyone who advocated investing in defense infrastructure was seen by the ruling Eastern ministers as a supporter of the Western faction and an enemy. As a result, little was done to prepare for a Japanese invasion.

== Imjin War ==
By 1591, the Joseon court began to realize Hideyoshi intended to attack Korea. Minister of the Left Yu Sŏngnyong broke with the Eastern faction and allowed some defense preparations to be undertaken, and began appointing new army commanders. Kim Sŏng-il was appointed as commander of the Kyongsang Right Army, which guarded Kyŏngsang-do, the province closest to Japan which contained the strategic port city of Busan. He had no previous military experience During this time, he opposed the appointment of Yi Sun-sin to Cholla Left Navy commander.

In 1592, Hideyoshi invaded Korea, landing at Busan and rapidly advancing north. The Joseon court blamed Kim Sŏng-il, for his earlier stance that Hideyoshi would not invade. He was arrested for making a false report to the King, a capital offense. Yu Sŏngnyong intervened and had him released.

Kim Sŏng-il became sick with plague and died in 1593. The Imjin war continued until 1598.
