= Hayang =

Coordinates: 35°55′N 128°49′E

- Town
- Panoramic view of Hayang

- Country: South Korea
- Province: North Gyeongsang
- City: Gyeongsan
- Administrative divisions: 16 beopjeongni, 34 hangjeongni and 315 ban

Area
  - Total: 48.61 km^{2} (18.77 sq mi)

Population (2015.5)
  - Total: 27,236
  - Density: 560.3/km^{2} (1,451/sq mi)
- Website: Hayang Town

Korean name
- Hangul: 하양읍
- Hanja: 河陽邑
- RR: Hayang-eup
- MR: Hayang-ŭp

Hayang (Korean: 하양읍) is a town, or eup in Gyeongsan, North Gyeongsang Province, South Korea. The township Hayang-myeon was upgraded to the town Hayang-eup in 1973. Hayang Town Office is located in Geumnak-ri, which is crowded with people.

== Communities ==
Hayang-eup is divided into 16 villages (ri).

	Hangul	Hanja
Geumnak-ri	금락리	琴樂里
Dori-ri	도리리	島里里
Seosa-ri	서사리	西沙里
Yangji-ri	양지리	陽地里
Sagi-ri	사기리	沙器里
Daegok-ri	대곡리	大谷里
Hansa-ri	한사리	翰斯里
Daehak-ri	대학리	大鶴里
Gyo-ri	교리	校里
Buho-ri	부호리	釜湖里
Eunho-ri	은호리	隱湖里
Namha-ri	남하리	南河里
Cheongcheon-ri	청천리	淸泉里
Hwansang-ri	환상리	環上里
Daejo-ri	대조리	大鳥里
Dongseo-ri	동서리	東西里
