= Hao (given name) =

- Pronunciation: /xaʊ/
- Gender: Male

Origin
- Origin: Chinese
- Meaning: Vast, of water (浩); Bright white (皓); Vast, of the sky (昊); Talented (豪); Vast, bright white (灏); Others

Hao is the pinyin and Wade–Giles transliteration of multiple Chinese masculine given names, written in Chinese as 浩, 皓, 昊, 豪, 灏, or other characters. People with this name include:

- Sun Hao (孙皓，243 – January or February 284), Eastern Wu emperor
- Jing Hao (荆浩, c. 855–915), Five Dynasties landscape painter and art theorist
- Cheng Hao (程顥, 1032–1085), Chinese philosopher
- Fu Hao (符浩, 1916–2016), Chinese diplomat
- Chang Hao (張灝, 1936–2022), Taiwanese historian and sinologist
- Lu Hao (陆昊, born 1967), Chinese politician
- Ning Hao (宁浩, born 1977), Chinese film director
- Wang Hao (王皓, born 1983), Chinese table tennis player
- Zhang Hao (张昊, born 1984), Chinese figure skater
- Rong Hao (荣昊, born 1987), Chinese footballer
- Wang Hao (王皓, born 1989), Chinese chess grandmaster
- Chen Hao (陈浩, born 1990), Chinese baseball player
- Chen Zhihao (陈智豪, born 1990), also known as Hao, Chinese professional gamer
- Chang Hao (張浩, born 1990), Taiwanese windsurfer
- You Hao (尤浩, born 1992), Chinese artistic gymnast
- Liu Hao (刘浩, born 1993), Chinese sprint canoeist
- Christina Gao, born Gao Hao (高昊, 1994), American figure skater
- Zhang Hao (章昊, born 2000), Chinese singer

== See also ==
- Wang Hao (disambiguation)
- Zhang Hao (disambiguation)
- Chang Hao (disambiguation)
- Chen Hao (disambiguation)
- Li Hao (disambiguation)
- Liu Hao (disambiguation)
- Yang Hao (disambiguation)
