= 1598 =

1598 in various calendars
- Gregorian calendar: 1598; MDXCVIII
- Ab urbe condita: 2351
- Armenian calendar: 1047; ԹՎ ՌԽԷ
- Assyrian calendar: 6348
- Balinese saka calendar: 1519–1520
- Bengali calendar: 1004–1005
- Berber calendar: 2548
- English Regnal year: 40 Eliz. 1 – 41 Eliz. 1
- Buddhist calendar: 2142
- Burmese calendar: 960
- Byzantine calendar: 7106–7107
- Chinese calendar: 丁酉年 (Fire Rooster); 4295 or 4088 — to — 戊戌年 (Earth Dog); 4296 or 4089
- Coptic calendar: 1314–1315
- Discordian calendar: 2764
- Ethiopian calendar: 1590–1591
- Hebrew calendar: 5358–5359
- Hindu calendars
- Vikram Samvat: 1654–1655
- Shaka Samvat: 1519–1520
- Kali Yuga: 4698–4699
- Holocene calendar: 11598
- Igbo calendar: 598–599
- Iranian calendar: 976–977
- Islamic calendar: 1006–1007
- Japanese calendar: Keichō 3 (慶長３年)
- Javanese calendar: 1518–1519
- Julian calendar: Gregorian minus 10 days
- Korean calendar: 3931
- Minguo calendar: 314 before ROC 民前314年
- Nanakshahi calendar: 130
- Thai solar calendar: 2140–2141
- Tibetan calendar: མེ་མོ་བྱ་ལོ་ (female Fire-Bird); 1724 or 1343 or 571 — to — ས་ཕོ་ཁྱི་ལོ་ (male Earth-Dog); 1725 or 1344 or 572

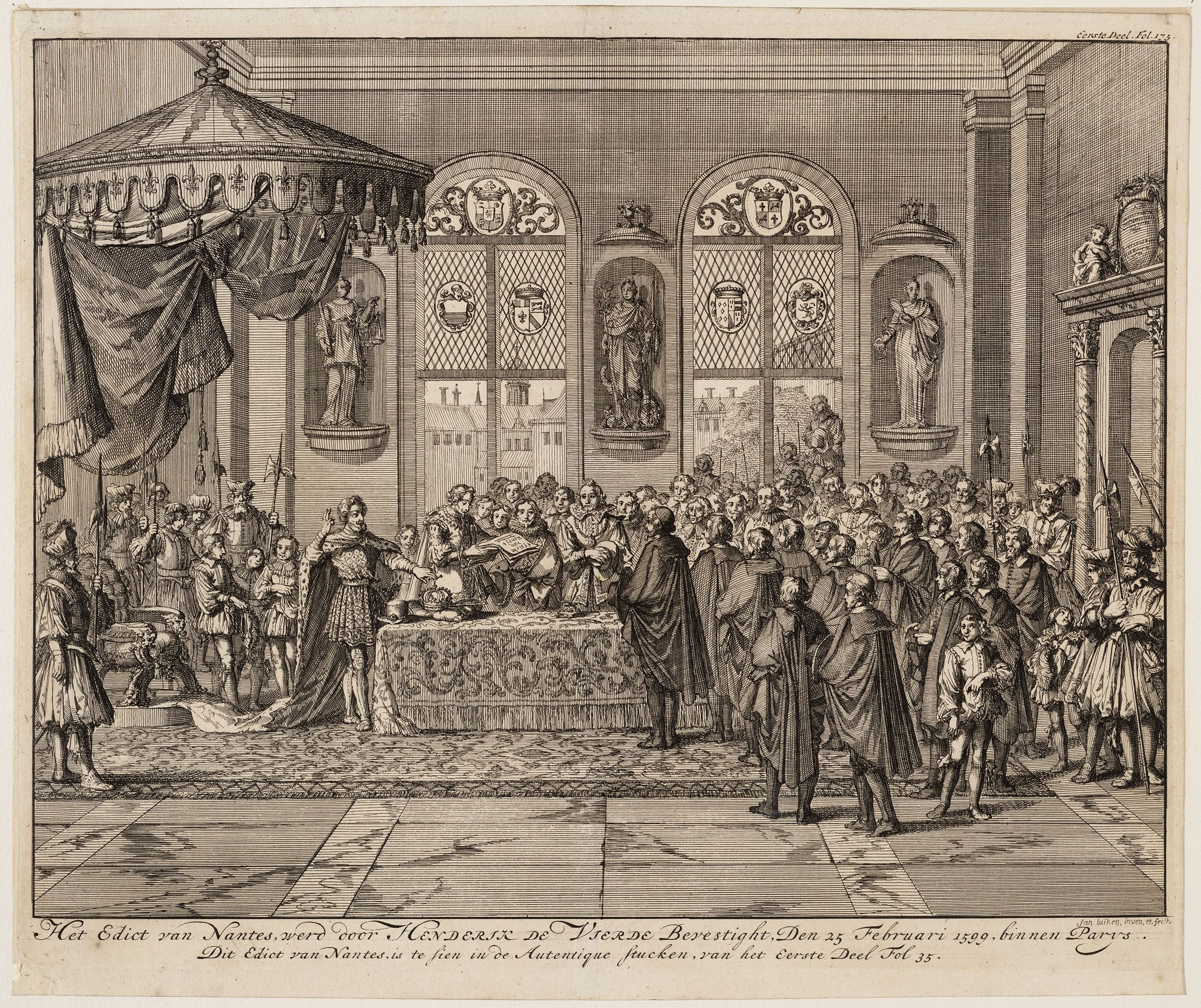
April 13: The Edict of Nantes is signed.

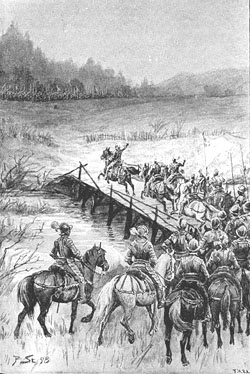
September 25: Battle of Stångebro

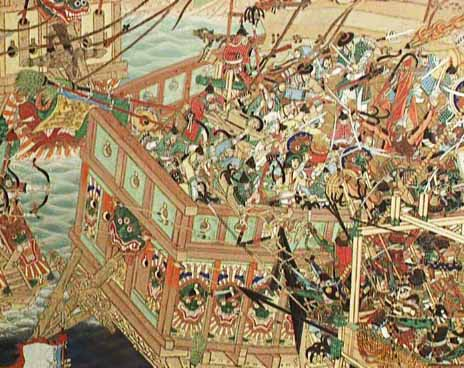
December 16: Battle of Noryang

1598 (MDXCVIII) was a common year starting on Thursday of the Gregorian calendar and a common year starting on Sunday of the Julian calendar, the 1598th year of the Common Era (CE) and Anno Domini (AD) designations, the 598th year of the 2nd millennium, the 98th year of the 16th century, and the 9th year of the 1590s decade. As of the start of 1598, the Gregorian calendar was 10 days ahead of the Julian calendar, which remained in localized use until 1923.

== Events ==
=== January–March ===
- January 8 – In Berlin, Joachim Frederich of the House of Hohenzollern becomes the new Elector of Brandenburg upon the death of his father, Johann Georg von Brandenburg.
- January 17 – The Tsar of the Russian Empire, Feodor I, dies of a sudden illness at the age of 40, leaving no children and bringing an end to the Rurik dynasty. His widow, Irina Godunova, takes action to secure the throne but her rule lasts for only nine days.
- January 26 – After receiving no support from the Russian nobles, the Tsaritsa Irina Godunova abandons her brief rule as autocrat of Russia, and abdicates in favor of her older brother, Boris Godunov.
- January 29 – In what is now South Korea, a force of 50,000 troops of the Korean kingdom of Joseon and Chinese Ming dynasty troops begins the siege of Ulsan, a Japanese-controlled castle located in the southwest port of Ulsan on the Sea of Japan.
- January 30 – In Italy Cesare d'Este moves the capital of the Duchy of Modena and Reggio to the city of Modena, after the Duchy of Ferrara is declared by Pope Clement VIII to be at an end.
- February 21 – Boris Godunov is elected as the Tsar of Russia by unanimous vote of the parliament of nobles, the Zemsky Sobor.
- March 19 – Count Adolf von Schwarzenberg of Austria captures the Turkish fortress at Győr, four years after Turkish forces had taken it over.
- March 20 – The Duchy of Brittany in France is conquered by King Henry IV, who forces the surrender of Philippe Louis de Lorraine-Mercœur, Duke of Brittany. Merceur is then exiled to Hungary.
- March 23 – The abdication of Sigismund Báthory as Prince of Transylvania (now part of Romania) is accepted by the Transylvanian nobles. Sigismund's cousin, Andrew Báthory, is then elected as the new Prince.

=== April–June ===
- April 13 – Edict of Nantes (promulgated April 30): Henry IV of France grants French Huguenots equal rights with Catholics; this is considered the end of the French Wars of Religion.
- April 30 – In Mexico, on the day of the Feast of the Ascension, Juan de Oñate, dispatched by the Viceroy of New Spain to expand the Spanish colony's territory, assembles his group on the south side of the Rio Grande and formally claims all territory north of the river (near what is now the U.S. city of El Paso, Texas) as a colony of the Spanish Empire.
- May 2 – The Peace of Vervins, mediated by Cardinal Alessandro de Medici, ends the war between France and Spain.
- May 6 – King Philip II of Spain announces that his eldest daughter, Isabella Clara Eugenia, will marry Albert of Austria (at the time a Roman Catholic cardinal and Archbishop of Toledo), and that the two will jointly govern the Habsburg Netherlands (now Belgium).
- May 13 (Keichō 3, 8th day of the 4th month) – The Mount Asama volcano on the Japanese island of Honshu erupts.
- May – Tycho Brahe's star catalogue Astronomiæ instauratæ mechanica, listing the positions of 1,004 stars, is published.
- June 9 – The Principality of Wallachia becomes a vassal state of the Austrian Habsburgs and the Holy Roman Empire, after Michael the Brave (Mihai Pătrașcu, with a regnal name of Michael II) signs an agreement at Prague with Rudolf II, Holy Roman Emperor to receive protection from the Ottoman Empire.
- June 15 – England invades the Caribbean island of Puerto Rico with a force of 20 ships and 1,700 men led by the Earl of Cumberland.
- June 27 – The ill-fated Dutch expedition of Jacques Mahu begins as his ship Hoop, along with the ships Liefde, Geloof, Trouwe and Blijde Boodschap, departs from Rotterdam.
- June 30 – England's forces capture the Castillo San Felipe del Morro, the Spanish fortress defending San Juan, after a 15-day battle. When an epidemic begins taking its toll on the English forces, the Earl of Cumberland decides to withdraw and departs in August.

=== July–September ===
- July 10 – John Barrose, a Burgundian fencer who has challenged all comers and killed several, is hanged for murder. Barrose's story is dramatised by playwright Ben Jonson in Every Man in His Humour.
- July 12 – After fording the Rio Grande near what are now the Mexican city of Juarez and the U.S. city of El Paso, Juan de Oñate proclaims the founding of the colony of Santa Fe de Nuevo Méjico (Santa Fe of New Mexico), with himself as the first Viceroy. Oñate establishes the first capital of the New Mexico viceroyalty at a new village, San Juan de los Caballeros, near the Pueblo Indian city of Ohkay Owingeh, now located in Rio Arriba County, New Mexico.
- July 13 – A marriage contract is signed as part of the treaty of Saint-Germain-en-Laye between King Henry IV of France and Duke Charles III of Lorraine, providing for King Henry's niece, Catherine of Bourbon, to marry Duke Charles's son, Henry of Lorraine.
- July 22 – William Shakespeare registers the rights to his new play, The Merchant of Venice, in the Register of the Stationers Company, under the title The Marchaunt of Venyce or otherwise called The Jewe of Venyce.
- July 23 – Sigismund III Vasa, King of Poland and Grand Duke of Lithuania, departs from Danzig (now Gdańsk) with 80 transports, several warships and exiled members of the Swedish parliament to invade Sweden. The troops land at Kalmar on July 31, and secure its surrender.
- July – Philosopher Tommaso Campanella moves from Naples to Calabria, where he will be involved in a revolt against the rule of the Spanish viceroy the following year.
- August 14 – Battle of the Yellow Ford in Ireland: Hugh O'Neill, Earl of Tyrone, gains victory over an English expeditionary force under Henry Bagenal, in the Nine Years' War against English rule.
- August 16 (Keichō 3, 15th day of the 7th month) – The Council of Five Elders, to serve in Japan as regents after the death of General Hideyoshi, is gathered at Fushimi on orders of Hideyoshi, and the members vow their allegiance to Hideyoshi's son, Hideyori.
- September 2 – The Mahu expedition from the Dutch Republic arrives at the Cape Verde Islands off of the coast of Africa, and many of the men become fatally ill, including Captain Jacques Mahu, who dies on September 23.
- September 5 (Keichō 3, 5th day of the 8th month) – With his own death imminent, General Toyotomi Hideyoshi of Japan issues an order directing the Council of Five Elders to bring their children to the Osaka Castle to join Hideyoshi's designated successor, his son Hideyori.
- September 10 – Prince Michael II of Wallachia begins the siege of Nicopolis (now Nikopol in Bulgaria).
- September 13 – Philip III becomes the new King of Spain upon the death of his father Philip II.
- September 17 – Second Dutch Expedition to Indonesia: Jacob Corneliszoon van Neck and three ships commanded by him are separated from the Dutch Republic fleet of Admiral Wybrand van Warwyck, and land on a Portuguese-charted island, Ilha do Cisne. Van Neck names the island Mauritius, after Maurice, Prince of Orange. Although Diogo Fernandes Pereira and sailors from Portugal had, in 1507, become the first Europeans to find Mauritius, van Neck's men apparently are the first to sight the dodo, a now extinct bird.
- September 18 (Keichō 3, 18th day of the 8th month) – General Toyotomi Hideyoshi, who united Japan and became the Chancellor of the Realm, dies after ruling 12 years. He is nominally succeeded by his 5-year-old son, Toyotomi Hideyori, with the regency exercised by the Council of Five Elders.
- September 25 – Battle of Stångebro at Linköping in Sweden: The Catholic King Sigismund of Sweden and Poland is defeated in his attempt to resume control of Sweden by the Protestant forces of his uncle, Charles. Sigismund is deposed shortly thereafter.

=== October–December ===
- October 19 – The Siege of Suncheon, an attempt by Korean and Chinese troops to capture the Japanese-occupied Suncheon Castle. An attempt to lure Japanese General Konishi Yukinaga into an ambush fails when a Korean Army cannon is fired too early and gives away the Korean plan.
- November 2 – Admiral Yi Sunsin of the Korean Navy attempts to bombard the Suncheon Castle, two days after the joint Chinese and Korean land assault is driven back. Korea and China lose 39 ships when a large number of the fleet gets stuck in the shallow waters at low tide and the vessels are attacked by the Japanese. Yi Sunsin calls off the siege the next day.
- November 10 (11th waxing of Tazaungmon 960 ME) – In what is now the Rakhine State of Myanmar, King Min Razagyi of Arakan and the rebel leader Minye Thihathu begin their assault on Pegu, the remaining portion of the Toungoo Empire in southern Burma.
- November 15 – Pope Clement VIII authorizes the marriage between Albert of Austria and Isabella Clara Eugenia of Spain. The two will be married on April 18.
- December 4 – In what is now part of the U.S. state of New Mexico, a dispute breaks out between the Keres people of the Acoma Pueblo (near what is now Albuquerque, New Mexico between the Keres Chief Zutacapan and the Spanish colonial envoy Juan de Zaldívar. After being refused food and shelter for himself and his 16 men, Zaldivar retaliates by pillaging Acoma, and Zutacapan orders a counterattack in which Zaldivar and 11 other men are killed. Spanish troops from the Santa Fe de New Mexico colony retaliate on January 22 by carrying out the Acoma Massacre of 800 people.
- December 16 (Keichō 3, 19th day of the 11th month, lunar calendar) – Battle of Noryang: An allied Korean and Chinese fleet under Korean Admiral Yi Sun-sin and Chinese Admiral Chen Lin defeats the Japanese navy, ending the Japanese invasions of Korea (1592–98).
- December 21 – Battle of Curalaba: The revolting Mapuche, led by cacique Pelantaro, inflict a major defeat on Spanish troops in southern Chile; all Spanish cities south of the Bío Bío River eventually fall victim to the Destruction of the Seven Cities by the Mapuches, and all conquest of Mapuche territories by Europeans practically ceases, until the later 19th century Occupation of Araucanía.
- December 29 – Pope Clement VIII refuses to allow dispensation for Henry of Lorraine, who is Catholic, to marry Catherine of Bourbon, a Protestant Calvinist. King Henry IV of France then intimidates the Catholic Archbishop of Reims into authorizing the marriage.

=== Date unknown ===
- Carnival – Jacopo Peri's Dafne, the earliest known modern opera, is premièred at the Palazzo Corsini, Florence.
- Pentecost – Calvinist congregations in Zurich introduce music into their services.
- The Parliament of England passes the Vagabonds Act, that allows transportation of convicts to colonies.
- Illustrations of Ottoman Turkish and European riflemen, with detailed illustrations of their firearms, appear in Zhao Shizhen's book Shenqipu in this year, during the Ming Dynasty of China.
- The Spanish establish themselves in El Piñal, a trading port on the coast of China in the Pearl River Delta.

== Births ==
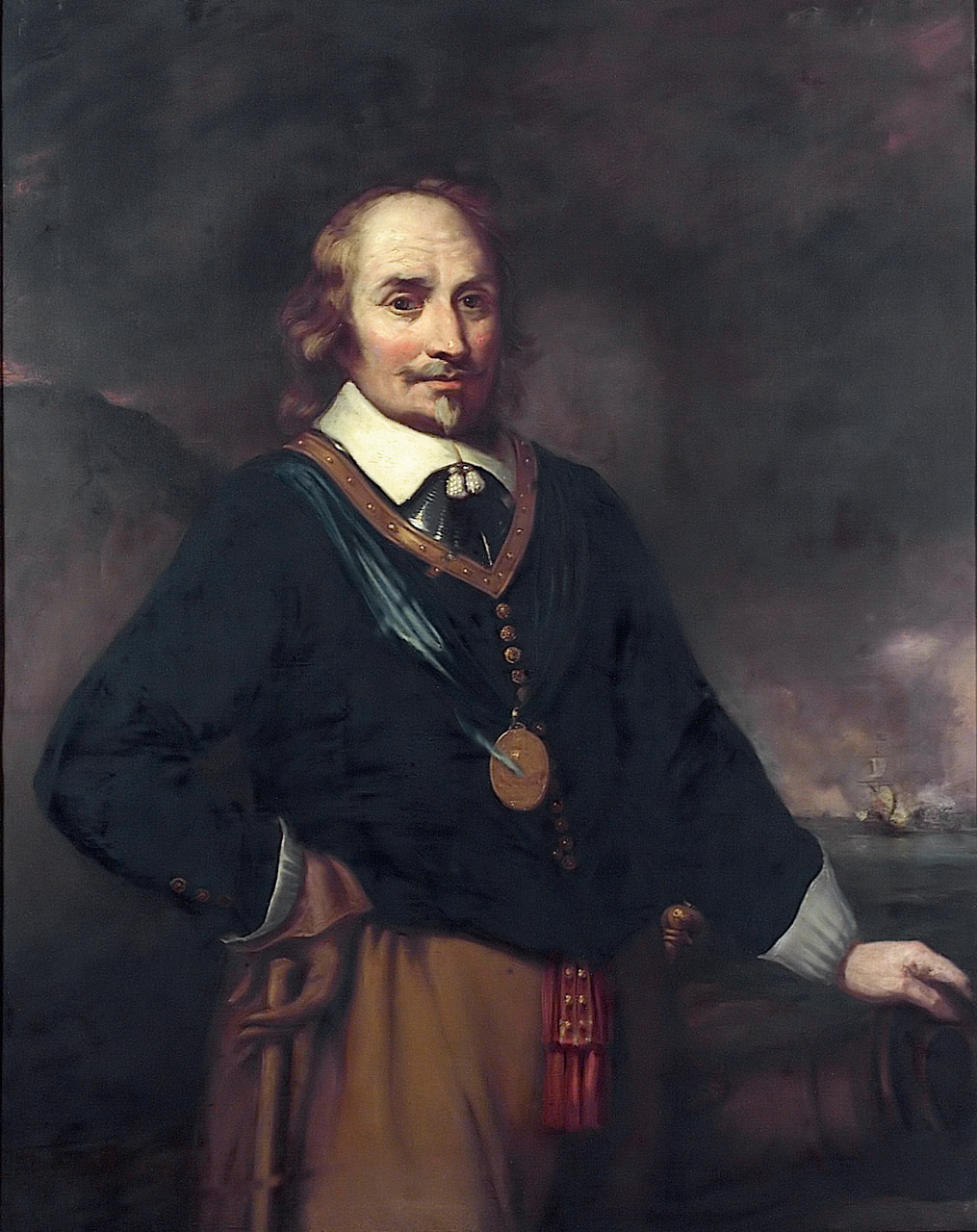
Maarten Tromp

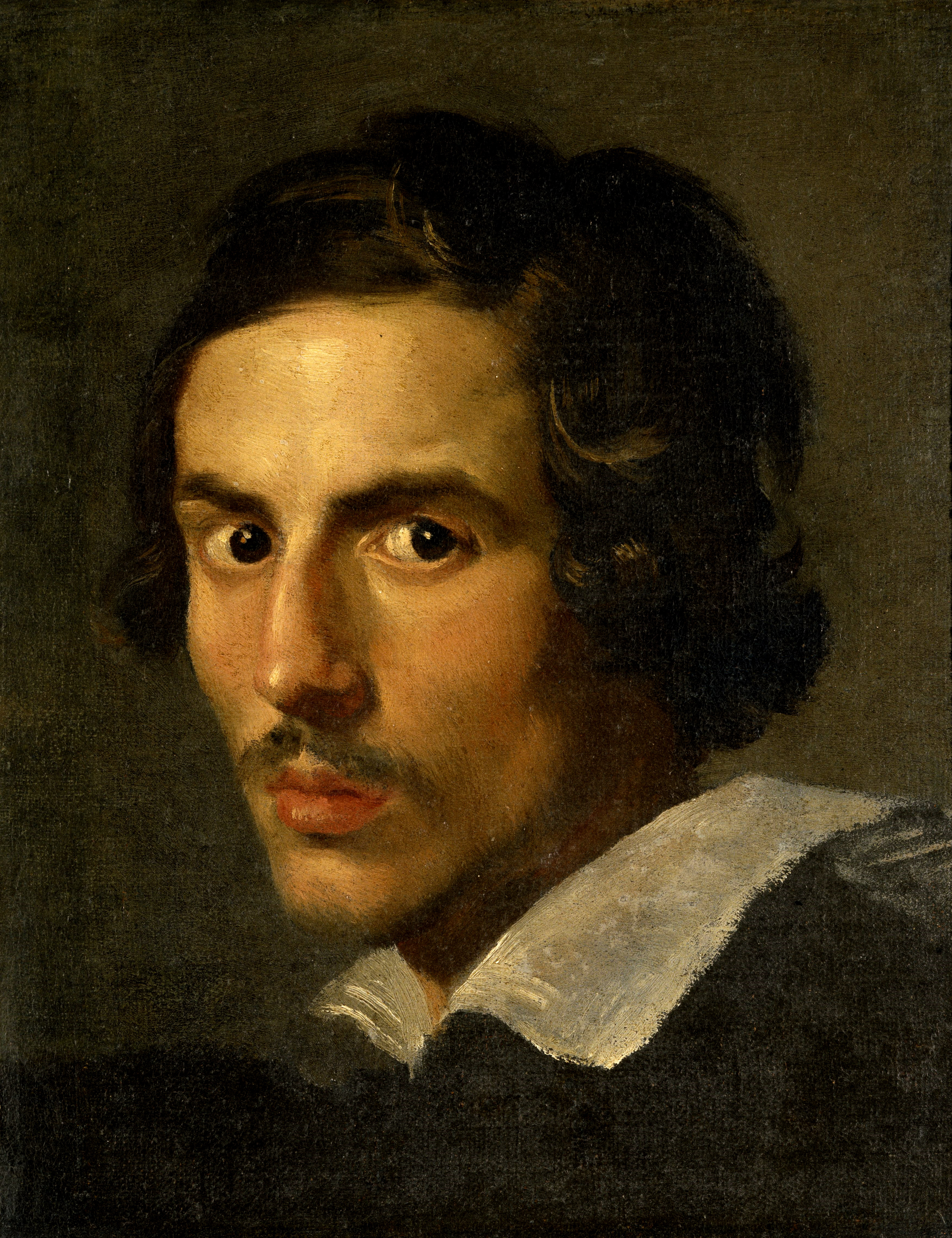
Gian Lorenzo Bernini

=== January–March ===
- January 23 – François Mansart, French architect (d. 1666)
- March 12 – Guillaume Colletet, French writer (d. 1659)
- March 13 – Johannes Loccenius, German historian (d. 1677)
- March 15 – Redemptus of the Cross, Portuguese Carmelite lay brother and martyr (d. 1638)
- March 25
  - Ralph Corbie, Irish Jesuit (d. 1644)
  - Robert Trelawney, English politician (d. 1643)
- March 26 – Sir William Lewis, 1st Baronet, English politician (d. 1677)

=== April–June ===
- April 9 – Johann Crüger, German composer of well-known hymns (d. 1662)
- April 11 – William, Duke of Saxe-Weimar, German nobleman (d. 1662)
- April 17 – Giovanni Battista Riccioli, Italian astronomer (d. 1671)
- April 23 – Maarten Tromp, officer and later admiral in the Dutch navy (d. 1653)
- April 28 – Francis Leigh, 1st Earl of Chichester, English politician (d. 1653)
- May 23 – Claude Mellan, French painter and engraver (d. 1688)
- June 4 – Åke Henriksson Tott, Swedish soldier and politician (d. 1640)
- June 19 – Gilbert Sheldon, Archbishop of Canterbury from 1663 until his death (d. 1677)

=== July–September ===
- July 6 – Kirsten Munk, Danish noble, spouse of King Christian IV of Denmark (d. 1658)
- July 29 – Henricus Regius, Dutch philosopher (d. 1679)
- July 31 – Alessandro Algardi, Italian high-Baroque sculptor active in Rome (d. 1654)
- August 7 – Georg Stiernhielm, Swedish civil servant (d. 1672)
- September 11 – Imre Thurzó, Hungarian noble (d. 1621)
- September 23 – Eleonora Gonzaga, Holy Roman Empress, married to Ferdinand II, Holy Roman Emperor (d. 1655)
- September 24 – Giovanni Francesco Busenello, Italian librettist (d. 1659)
- September 27 – Robert Blake, English admiral (d. 1657)

=== October–December ===
- October 14 – Nicolas de Neufville de Villeroy, Marshal of France (d. 1685)
- October 17 – Jørgen Knudsen Urne, Danish noble (d. 1642)
- October 19 – Isaac Commelin, Dutch historian (d. 1676)
- October 27 – Lars Stigzelius, Swedish Lutheran archbishop (d. 1676)
- November 3 – Christian I, Count Palatine of Birkenfeld-Bischweiler (1600–1654) (d. 1654)
- November 4 – Ernst Adalbert of Harrach, Austrian Catholic cardinal (d. 1667)
- November 7 – Francisco de Zurbarán, Spanish painter (d. 1664)
- November 28 – Hans Nansen, Danish statesman (d. 1667)
- December 7 – Gian Lorenzo Bernini, Italian sculptor (d. 1680)
- December 20 – Ottavio Farnese, Italian noble (d. 1643)
- December 22 – Henri de La Trémoille, French general and noble (d. 1674)
- December 24 – Margaret Stuart, Scottish princess (d. 1600)

=== Date unknown ===
- Bonaventura Cavalieri, Italian mathematician (d. 1647)
- Marmaduke Langdale, Royalist in the English Civil War (d. 1661)
- Baldassarre Longhena, Venetian architect (d. 1682)
- Jean Nicolet, French explorer (d. 1642)
- William Strode, English parliamentarian (d. 1645)
- Guðríður Símonardóttir, Icelandic woman known as a victim of the Turkish abductions (d. 1693)
- probable
  - Jean-Armand du Peyrer, Comte de Tréville and French officer (d. 1672)
  - Mary Bankes, Royalist in the English Civil War, defender of Corfe Castle (d. 1661)

== Deaths ==
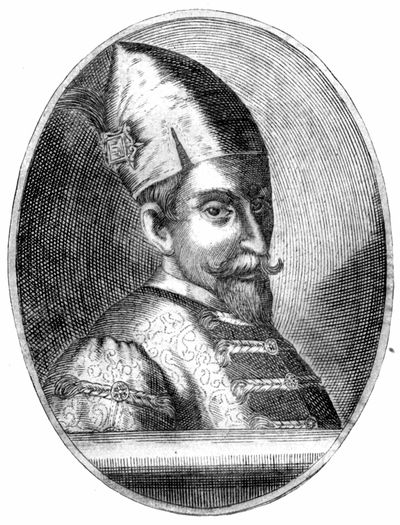
Tsar Feodor I of Russia

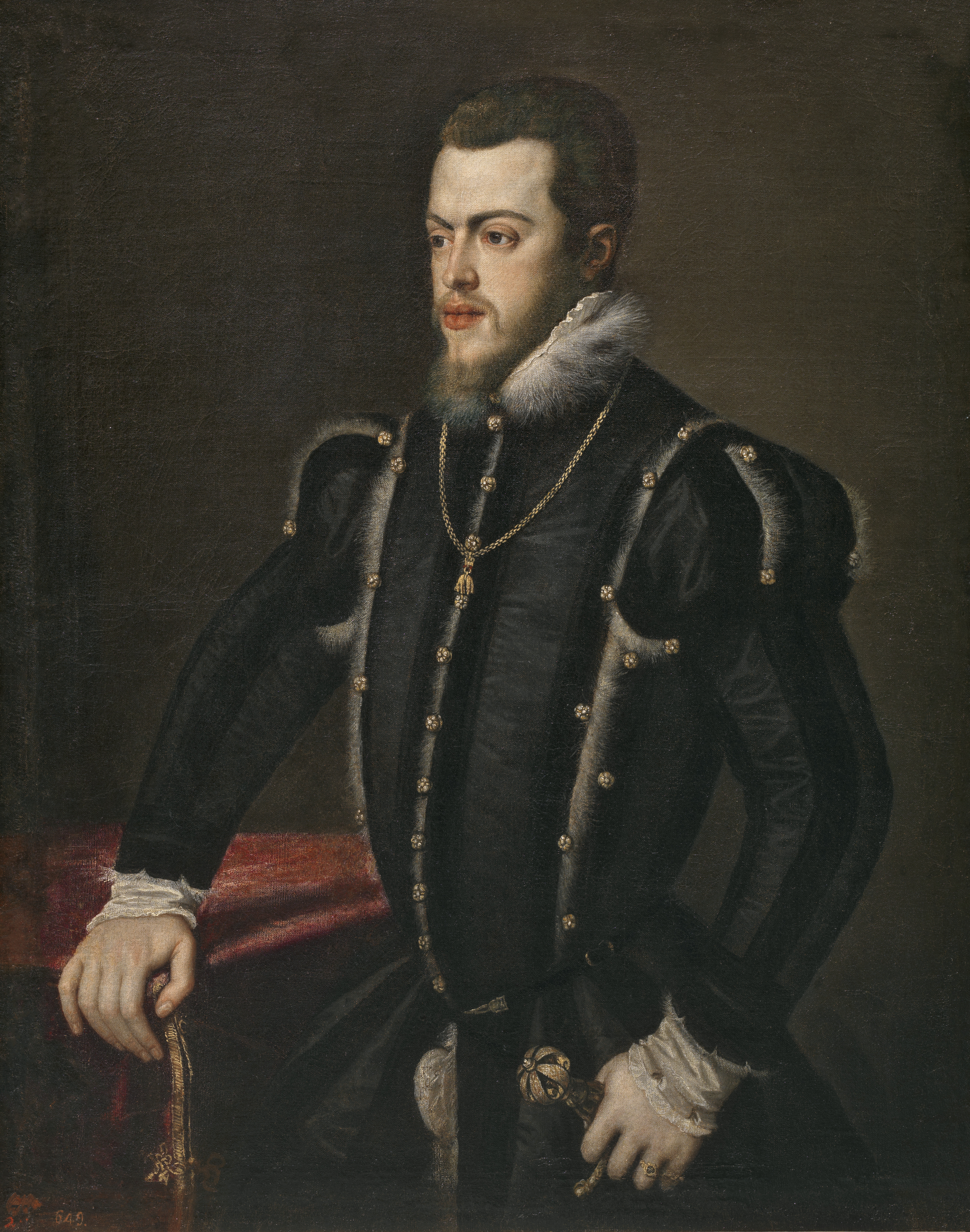
King Philip II of Spain

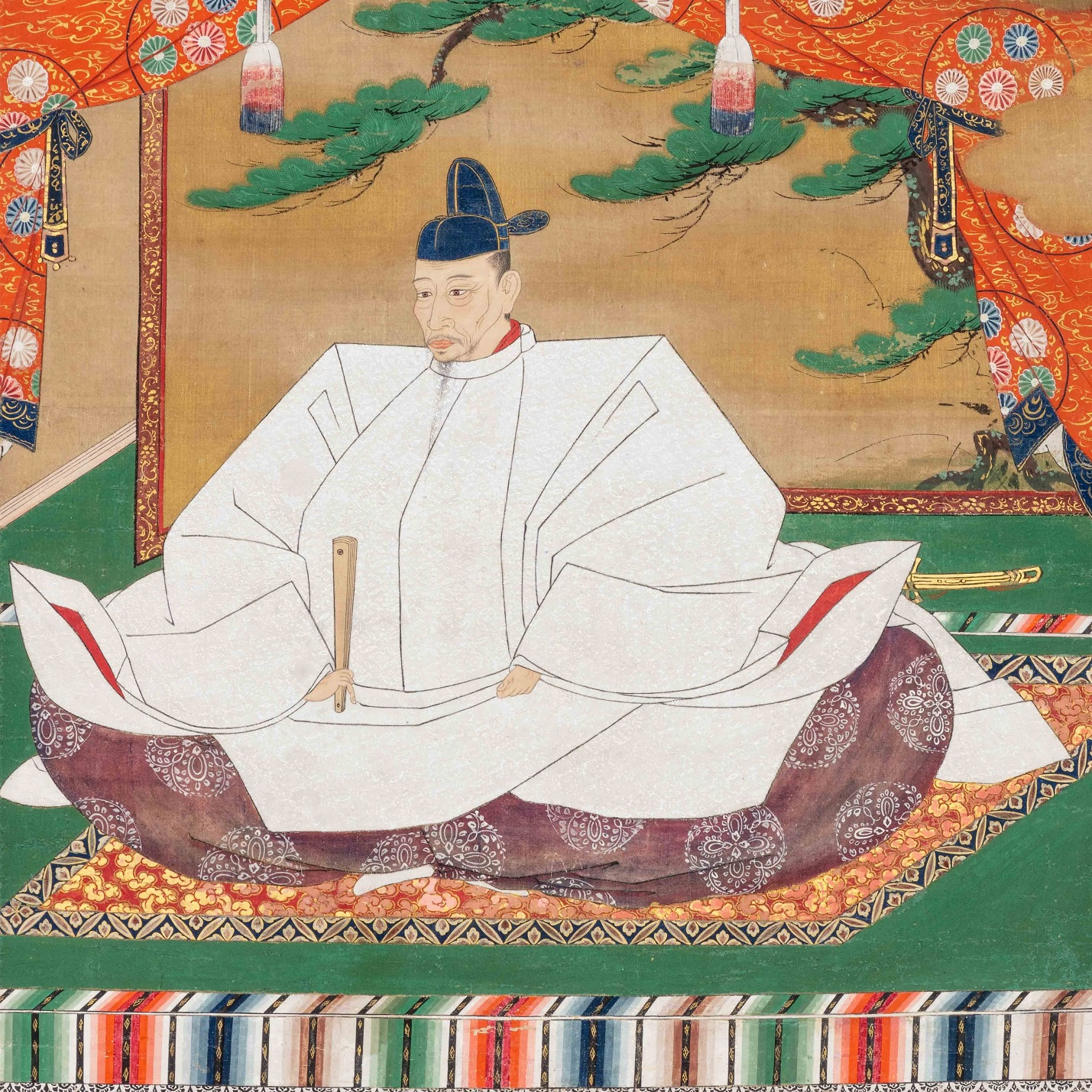
Toyotomi Hideyoshi

- January 8 – John George, Elector of Brandenburg, Margrave and Elector of Brandenburg and Duke of Prussia (b. 1525)
- January 9 – Jasper Heywood, English Jesuit classicist and translator (b. 1553)
- January 16 – Tsar Feodor I of Russia (b. 1557)
- February 10 – Anne of Austria, Queen of Poland (b. 1573)
- March 4 or March 5 – Lucas Maius, Lutheran Reformation pastor, theologian and playwright (b. 1522)
- March 28 – Michele Bonelli, Italian Catholic cardinal (b. 1541)
- April 8 – Ludwig Helmbold, German classical singer (b. 1532)
- April 10 – Jacopo Mazzoni, Italian philosopher (b. 1548)
- April 19
  - Hans Fugger, German businessman (b. 1531)
  - Rokkaku Yoshikata, Japanese daimyō (b. 1521)
- May 3 – Anna Guarini, Italian singer (b. 1563)
- May 18 – Philipp of Bavaria, German Catholic cardinal (b. 1576)
- June – Emery Molyneux, English maker of globes and instruments (date of birth unknown)
- June 28 – Abraham Ortelius, Flemish cartographer and geographer (b. 1527)
- June 25 – Giacomo Gaggini, Italian artist (b. 1517)
- August 4 – William Cecil, 1st Baron Burghley, English statesman (b. 1520)
- August 9 – Andreas Angelus, German pastor, teacher, chronicler of the Mark of Brandenburg (b. 1561)
- September 13 – Philip II of Spain (b. 1527)
- September 18 – Toyotomi Hideyoshi, Japanese warlord (b. 1537)
- October 11 – Joachim Camerarius the Younger, German scientist (b. 1534)
- November 12 – Johannes Schenck von Grafenberg, German physician (b. 1530)
- December 6 – Paolo Paruta, Italian historian (b. 1540)
- December 15 – Philips of Marnix, Lord of Saint-Aldegonde, Dutch writer and statesman (b. 1538)
- December 16 – Yi Sun-sin, Korean naval leader (b. 1545)
- December 31 – Heinrich Rantzau, German humanist writer, astrologer, and astrological writer (b. 1526)
- date unknown
  - Abdulla Khan, Uzbek/Turkoman ruler
  - Teodora Ginés, Dominican musician and composer (b. c. 1530)
  - Nicolas Pithou, French lawyer and author (b. 1524)
