= Waeseong in Jukseong-ri, Gijang =

Japanese fortress in Busan, South Korea

Coordinates: 35°14′30″N 129°14′30″E

Waeseong in Jukseong-ri, Gijang 機張 竹城里倭城 기장 죽성리왜성
- Gijang-gun, Busan, South Korea
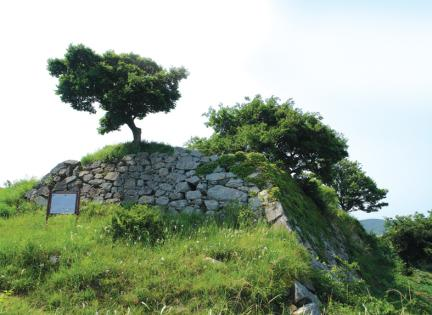

Site information
- Type: Japanese castle (Waeseong)

Location
- Height: 4m

Site history
- Built: 1593
- Built by: Kuroda Nagamasa
- In use: 1593–1598
- Materials: stone, wood, plaster walls

Garrison information
- Past commanders: Kuroda Nagamasa, Katō Kiyomasa

- Waeseong in Jukseong-ri, Gijang
- Hangul: 기장 죽성리왜성
- Hanja: 機張 竹城里倭城
- Revised Romanization: Gijang Jukseong-ri Waeseong
- McCune–Reischauer: Kijang Chuksŏng-ni Waesŏng

Waeseong in Jukseong-ri, Gijang (機張 竹城里倭城; Gijang Jukseong-ri waseong) is located in Gijang-gun, Busan, South Korea. It is a stone fortress built by the Japanese general, Kuroda Nagamasa who was defending the area against the Korean Joseon army in about June 1593, during the second year of the Imjin War.

This fortress built on the stronghold in the rear edge of the village of Jukseong-ri, was 11,176 pyeongs (a unit of area in the Joseon period) in area, about 300 metres in circumference, 4 metres in height, and three-storied. It has been called the Gijang fortress in Japan. It was placed at the strategically important point linking together the Seosaengpo Waeseong fortress in Ulsan, the Hakseong fortress and the Busanjinseong Fortress. Originally, it was built with the stones which had once constituted the Dumopojinseong fortress, so there are still the footstones of it in a row around the villages in Dumopo.

Today, the surrounding areas of the fortress are used as farming fields, but the stone wall still remains maintaining its original state relatively well.

The fortress was designated as a National Heritage Site in 1963, but was removed from the list in 1997.
