= Kwon Yul =

Kwon Yul may refer to:

- Kwŏn Yul (general) (1537–1599), Korean general of the Joseon dynasty.
- Yul Kwon (born 1975), American winner of the reality TV show Survivor: Cook Islands in 2006
- Kwon Yul (actor) (born 1982), South Korean actor
