= Zehao =

Zehao is the Mandarin Pinyin spelling of a Chinese given name.

People with this name include:

- Sun Zehao (born 1995), Chinese professional ice hockey goaltender
- Mok Chek Hou (莫泽浩, Mo Zehao), Malaysian politician, member of the Barisan National and Malaysian Chinese Association

== See also ==
- Hao (given name) for a list of people named Hao
- Hao (name)
- Hao (surname)
