= Japanese castles in Korea =

Japanese castles built in Korea during the 1592–1598 Japanese invasion of Korea

Japanese Castles in Korea (Korean: 왜성; Hanja: 倭城; RR: Waeseong; Japanese: 倭城, romanized: Wajō, Wesōn) are Japanese castles built by the armies of Toyotomi Hideyoshi along the southern shores of Korea during the Imjin War (1592–1598).

Japanese castles in Korea can be classified into two categories: castles built to secure supply lines for Japanese forces moving throughout Korea, and castles built primarily along the southern coast of Korea to serve as seats of governance.

The first category of castles was built between Busan and Seoul at intervals roughly equal to the distance an army could march in one day. The castle network was later expanded northward to Uiju. These castles were established either by reinforcing existing settlements or by building anew when no suitable settlement existed in the area that required a castle. Although their locations are currently unknown, they are also believed to have been built between Kilju and Anbyŏn in Hamgyong Province.

The second category of castles built along the southern coast were in Busan, Ulsan, South Gyeongsang Province, Suncheon, and South Jeolla Province. They are thought to have been built not only on the southern coast, but also inland. Thirty-two areas on the southern coast have already been investigated.

== Cultural Heritage Protection Act ==
Japanese Fortresses in Korea are protected by the Cultural Heritage Protection Act, just like Korean castles are. It is preserved by the Cultural Heritage Administration of Korea. Historically and culturally, Japanese Fortress must be preserved and can be designated as natural reserves and environmental reserves. Discussions that Japan's remnants should be eliminated could violate the Cultural Heritage Protection Act.

Article 2 of the Cultural Heritage Protection Act.

- Under the Cultural Heritage Protection Act, Japanese castles are afforded the same protection as the Korean castle.
- Specifies that property damage may be legally punished for burning, destroying, damaging or destroying a Japanese Fortress without consultation for no reason.

== List of Japanese castles in Korea ==
=== Japanese Invasion of Korea (1592 ~ 1598) ===
Name	Revised Romanization	Hangul	Hanja	Location	Comments
Gijang Castle	Gijang Jukseong-ri Waeseong	기장죽성리왜성	機張竹城里倭城	Busan	
Busanjinjiseong	Busanjin Jiseong	부산진지성	釜山鎭支城	Busan	
Ulsan Castle	Ulsan Waeseong	울산왜성	蔚山倭城	Ulsan	See also Siege of Ulsan
Seosaengpo Castle	Seosangpo Waeseong	서생포왜성	西生浦倭城	Ulsan	
Gwangni Castle	Gwangni Waeseong	광리왜성 (왜성동성, 견내량성)	廣里倭城 (倭城洞城, 見乃梁城)	Ulsan	
Gimhae Castle	Gimhae Waeseong	김해왜성	金海竹島倭城 駕洛城,竹島城	Gyeongsangnam-do	
Angolpo Castle	Angolpo Waeseong	안골포왜성	安骨浦倭城	Gyeongsangnam-do	
Gadeok Castle		가덕왜성	加德倭城	Gyeongsangnam-do	
Ungcheon Castle		웅천왜성	熊川倭城	Gyeongsangnam-do	
Changwon Castle		창원왜성	昌原倭城 馬山倭城	Gyeongsangnam-do	
Jangmunpo Castle		장문포왜성	長門逋倭城	Gyeongsangnam-do, Geoje Island	
Yeongdeungpo Castle		영등포왜성	永登浦倭城	Gyeongsangnam-do, Geoje Island	
Jisepo Castle		지세포		Gyeongsangnam-do, Geoje Island	
Goseong Castle		고성왜성	固城倭城	Gyeongsangnam-do	
Sacheon Castle		사천왜성	泗川倭城 船津里城	Gyeongsangnam-do	See also Battle of Sacheon (1598)
Namhae Castle		남해왜성	南海倭城 船所倭城	Gyeongsangnam-do	
Suncheon Castle		순천왜성	順天城	Suncheon	See also Siege of Suncheon All that remains of the castle today is the stone base.

== Gallery ==
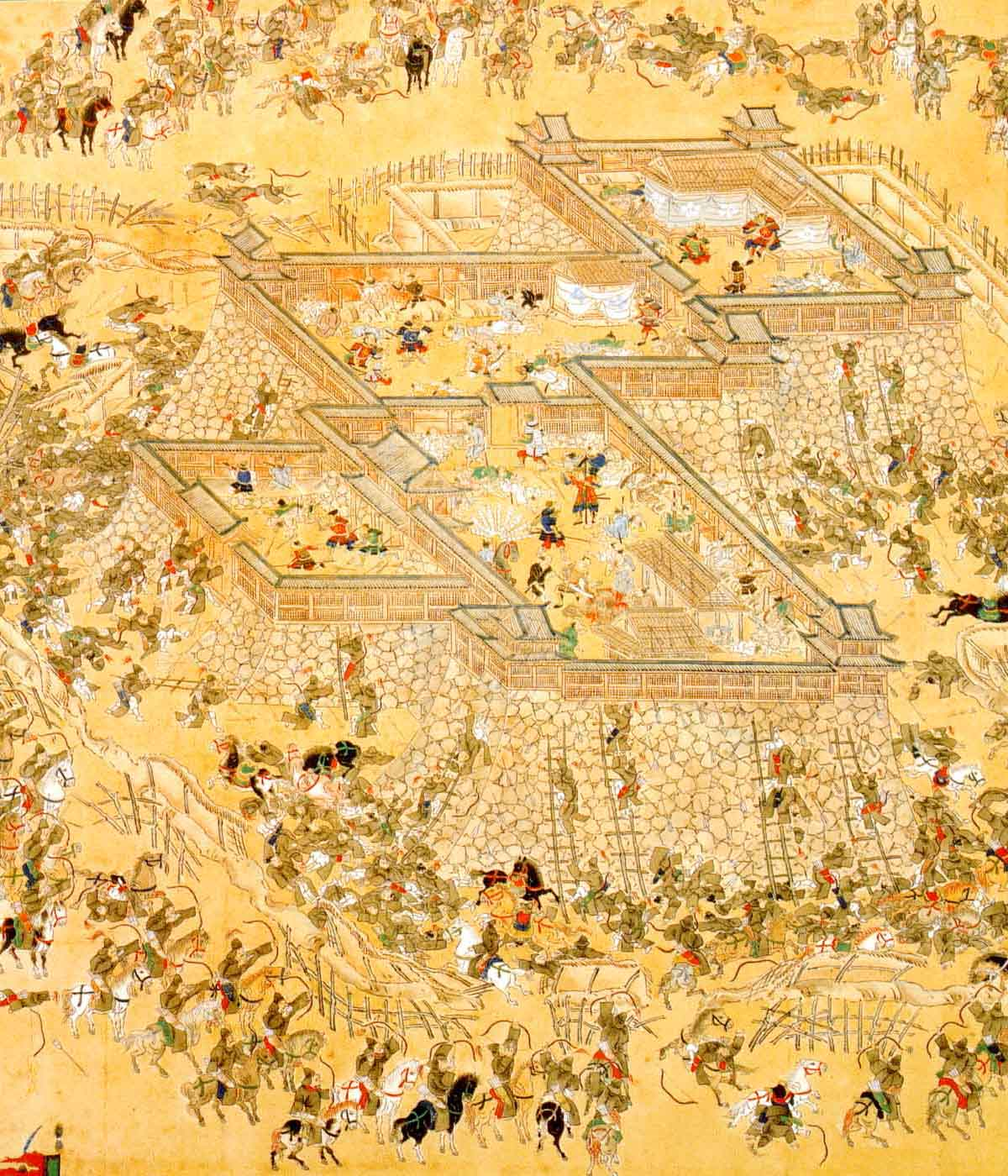
Japanese invasions of Korea (1592–1598) Ulsan Japanese fortress

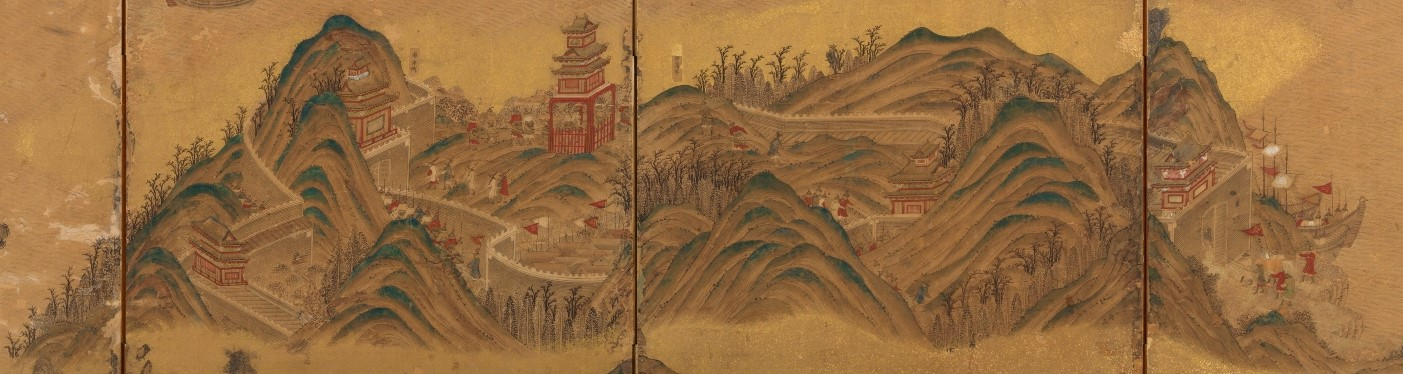
Namhae Seonso Japanese fortress

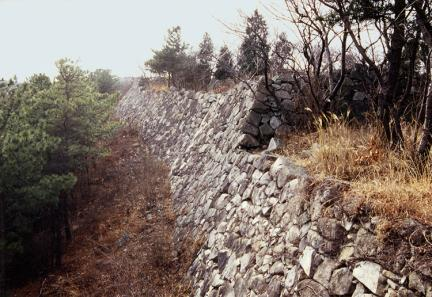
Ruins of Seosaengpo Japanese Fortress

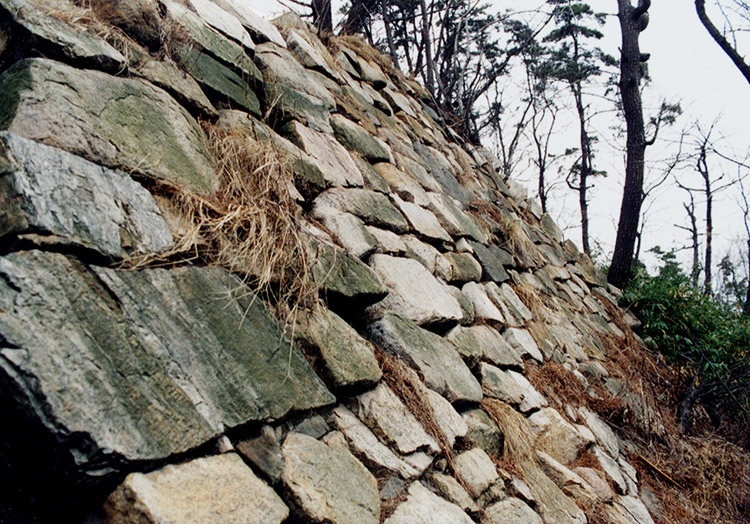
Ruins of Ulsan Castle

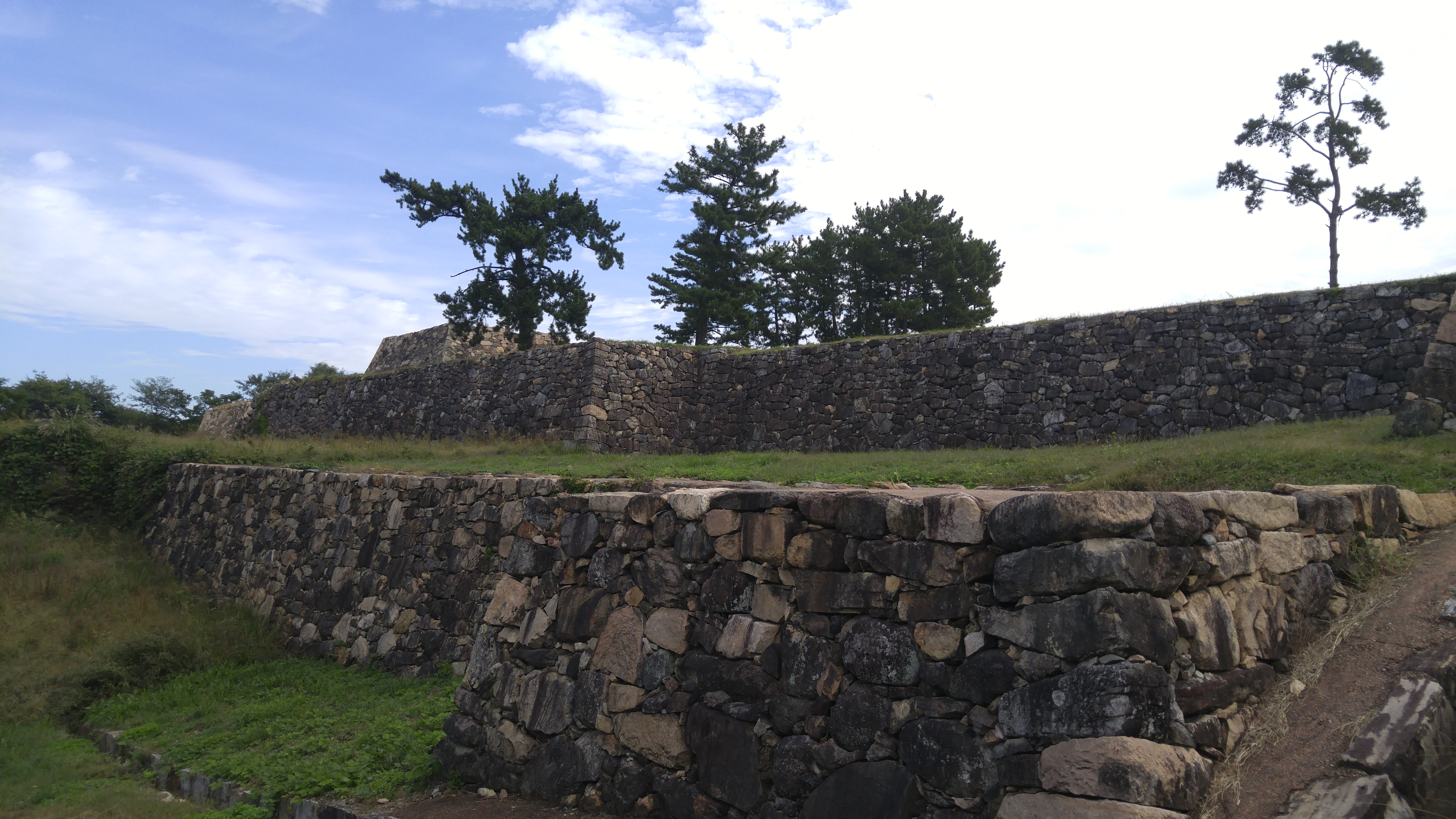
Ruins of Suncheon Japanese fortress

== See also ==
- List of fortresses in Korea
- Korean-style fortresses in Japan
