= Chang Hao =

Chang Hao may refer to:

- Chang Hao (Go player) (born 1976), Chinese Go player
- Chang Hao (historian) (1936–2022), Taiwanese historian and sinologist
- Chang Hao (windsurfer) (born 1990), Taiwanese windsurfer
- Chang Hao (synchronised swimmer) (born 1997), Chinese synchronised swimmer

== See also ==
- Zhang Hao (disambiguation) — "Chang Hao" is the Wade–Giles equivalent of "Zhang Hao"
