= Namhae Castle =

Coordinates: 34.8486°N 127.9112°E

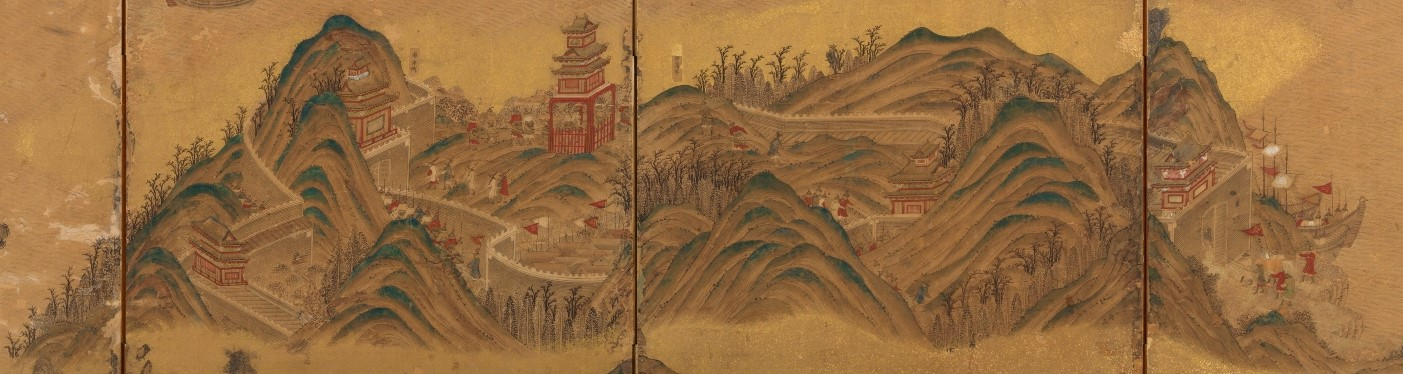
Painting of a Cleanup Operation in Namhae Waeseong

Namhae Castle or Namhae Waeseong (Japanese: 南海 船所倭城; Korean: 남해 선소왜성) is a waeseong or Japanese castle in Korea located on Namhaedo. It was built and used during the Imjin War (1593–1598).

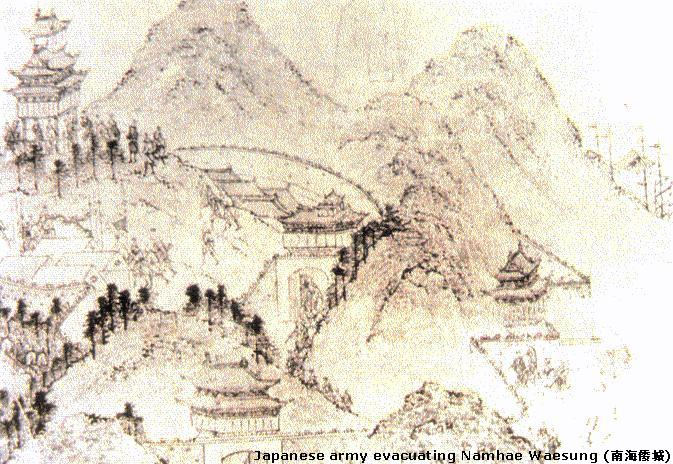
Dungeon of Namhae Japanese Castle
