= Zhang Hao =

Zhang Hao may refer to:

- Zhang Hao (general) (張顥, died 908), military and political figure of Yang Wu in the late Tang dynasty and early Five Dynasties period
- Zhang Hao (poet) (張昊, 1644–1669), Qing dynasty poet
- Zhang Hao (triple jumper) (张灏, born 1978), Chinese triple jumper
- Zhang Hao (figure skater) (张昊, born 1984), Chinese pair skater
- Zhang Hao (Tai Chi athlete) (张豪, born 1993), Chinese Tai Chi athlete
- Zhang Hao (footballer) (张浩, born 1994), Chinese association footballer
- Zhang Hao (singer) (章昊, born 2000), Chinese singer

== See also ==
- Chang Hao (disambiguation)
