= Chen Hao =

Chen Hao may refer to:

- Chen Hao (politician) (born 1954), Secretary of Yunnan Provincial Committee of CPC
- Moses Chan (born 1971), Hong Kong actor
- Chen Hao (actress) (born 1979), Chinese actress and model
- Chen Hao (baseball) (born 1990), Chinese baseball outfielder for the Jiangsu Hopestars
- Chen Hao (footballer, born 1993), Chinese footballer
- Chen Hao (footballer, born 2002), Chinese-Hong Kong footballer
