= Yang Hao =

Yang Hao may refer to:

- Yang Hao (Sui dynasty) (586–618), prince and claimant to the throne of Sui dynasty
- Yang Hao (Ming dynasty) (fl. 1596–1629), official and military leader
- Yang Hao (engineer)

== Sportspeople ==
- Yang Hao (volleyball) (born 1980), Chinese volleyball player
- Yang Hao (footballer, born 1983), Chinese football player for Jiangsu Sainty
- Yang Hao (footballer, born 1990), Chinese football player for Chengdu Tiancheng
- Yang Hao (diver) (born 1998), Chinese diver
