= Battle of Sarhū =

1619 Later Jin–Ming battles

Battle of Sarhu
- Part of the Ming-Qing transition
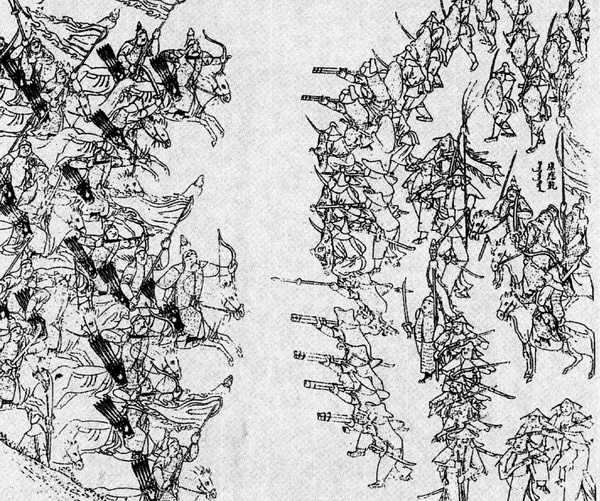
- The Jurchen cavalry charging Ming infantry in the battle of Sarhu.
Date	14 April 1619 – 18 April 1619
Location	Fushun, China 41°52′52″N 123°57′25″E
Result	Later Jin victory

Belligerents
Later Jin	Ming dynasty; Joseon

Commanders and leaders
Nurhaci; Hong Taiji; Daišan; Laimbu	Ming: Yang Hao; Du Song †; Wang Xuan †; Zhao Menglin †; Zhang Quan #; Gong Niansui †; Ma Lin; Pan Zongyan (DOW); Dou Yongcheng †; Liu Ting †; Kang Yingqian #; Qiao Yiqi; Li Rubai; He Shixian (DOW); Joseon: Gang Hong-rip (surrendered); Haixi Jurchen: Buyanggu; Gintaisi

Strength
60,000	Ming: 90,000–120,000; Joseon: 13,000

Casualties and losses
2,000–5,000	45,000; 300 officers; 28,000 horses

The Battle of Sarhū (simplified Chinese: 萨尔浒之战; traditional Chinese: 薩爾滸之戰; pinyin: Sà'ěrhǔ zhī zhàn) refers to a series of battles between the Later Jin dynasty (the predecessor of the Qing dynasty) and the Ming dynasty and their Joseon allies in 1619. The battle is notable for the heavy use of cavalry by the Later Jin in defeating Ming and Joseon forces equipped with hand cannons, cannons, and matchlocks.

== Background ==
Prior to the battle, Nurhaci had unified the Jurchen people, excluding the Yehe, and took a hostile attitude towards the Ming for favoritism and meddling in the affairs of the Jurchen tribes. In 1618, he proclaimed his Seven Grievances (nadan amba koro 七大恨) with the Ming to Heaven and subsequently declared war on the Ming. He occupied Fushun, Qinghe (清河), and other cities before retreating. The death of the Ming Vice-General Zhang Chengyin (張承蔭) during the Battle of Fushun stunned the Ming court. In 1619, he attacked the Yehe (葉赫) in an attempt to provoke the Ming. The Ming responded by dispatching expeditionary forces led by Military Commissioner Yang Hao to besiege the Later Jin capital Hetu Ala from four routes.

== Organization ==
Unit	Commanders	Estimated size
HQ	Military Commissioner (經略) Yang Hao (楊鎬)	several thousand
Left Wing West Route Force	Regional Commander (總兵) Du Song (杜松, Route Commander); Regional Commander Wang Xuan (王宣); Regional Commander Zhao Menglin (趙夢麟); Army-inspecting Censor (監軍) Zhang Quan (張銓)	30,000
Left Wing West Route Force	Mobile Corps Commander (游擊) Gong Niansui (龔念遂); Mobile Corps Commander Li Jibi (李季泌)	2,000
Left Wing North Route Force	Regional Commander Ma Lin (馬林, Route Commander); Vice-General (副將) Ma Yan (麻巖)	10,000
Left Wing North Route Force	Army-inspecting Censor Pan Zongyan (潘宗顏)	10,000
Left Wing North Route Force	Mobile Corps Commander Dou Yongcheng (竇永澄); Gintaisi (金台石) (Yehe)	10,000
Right Wing East Route Force	Regional Commander Liu Ting (劉綎, Route Commander); Army-Inspecting Censor Kang Yingqian (康應乾)	10,000
Right Wing East Route Force	Mobile Corps Commander (游擊) Qiao Yiqi 喬一琦; Joseon Expeditionary Force Commander Gang Hong-rip (姜弘立)	20,000
Right Wing South Route Force	Regional Commander Li Rubai (李如栢, Route Commander); Regional Commander He Shixian (賀世賢); Army-inspecting Censor Yan Mingtai (閻鳴泰)	40,000

== Course of battle ==
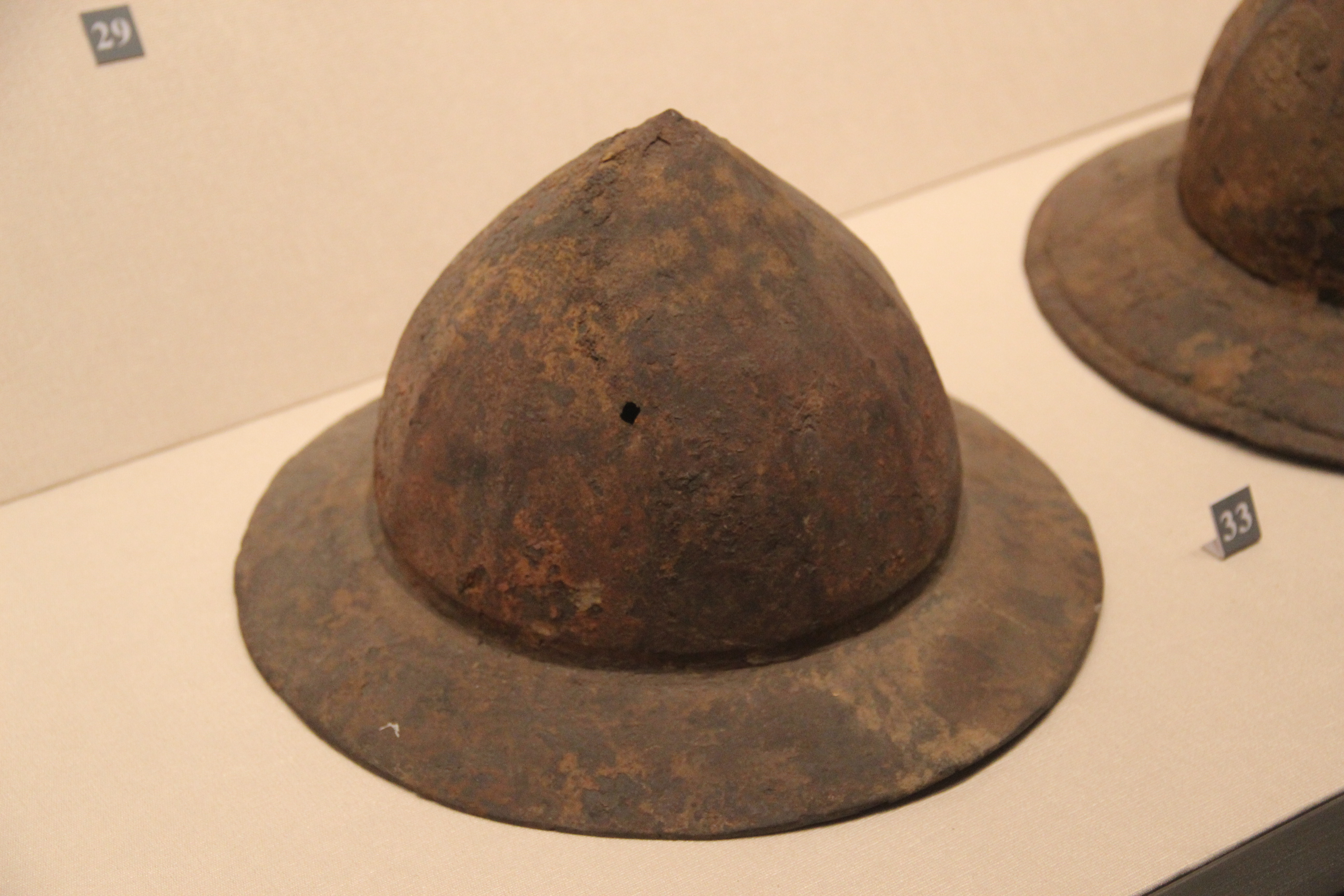
Ming dynasty helmet

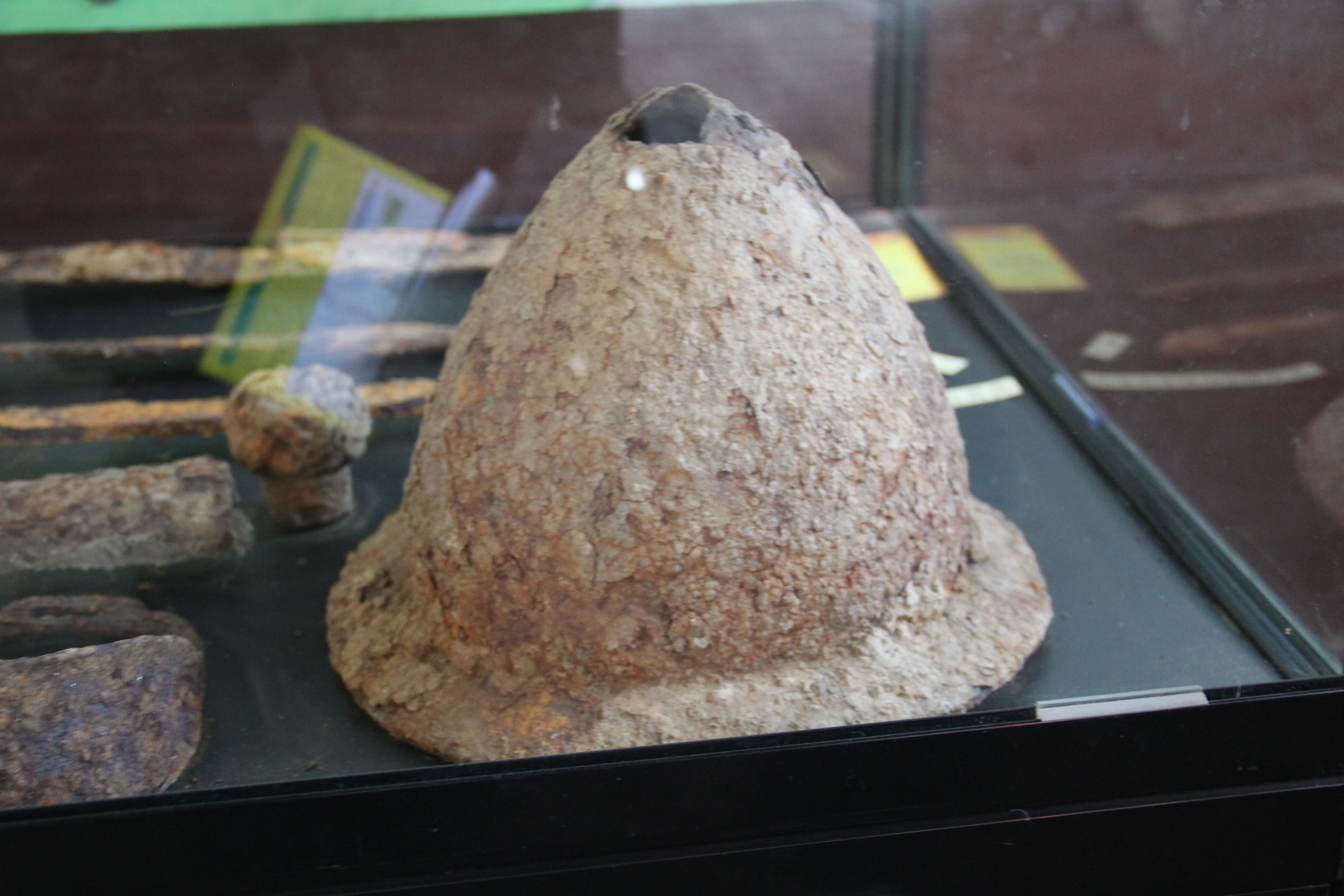
Jurchen helmet

=== Western Route ===
Du Song's forces set off west from Shenyang on the night of the 29th of the 2nd lunar month under torchlight. He had orders to arrive at Yagu Gate on the 2nd of the 3rd lunar month, so he arrived the next day at Fushun, 100 li (里) away, and captured the undefended city. Du's army was delayed by snow and stayed at Fushun for some time, but Du grew impatient and set forth with his army after 10 days despite the unfavorable conditions.

When they arrived at the Hun River, the Jin had already set up defences on the other side of the river. Du Song was advised to camp for the night, but he refused and took 10,000 men with him across the river to attack Jin defenses, while leaving 20,000 with the artillery train and baggage on the other side. One source accuses him of drunkenness, saying it clouded his judgment that night. He was asked to wear armor prior to the crossing, but he replied that being in the military for this many years, he did not know how heavy armor was as he never wore it, and crossed the river. When his forces were halfway across, Nurhaci ordered his bannermen to break the dams they had prepared and Du's men had to abandon their equipment to escape the current. The commander in charge of artillery and baggage was supposed to coordinate the crossing following Du, but he refused due to the river's turbulence.

That night, Du Song divided his forces into two camps, one at Sarhu Mountain Pass and one at Jilin Cliff where he camped. Nurhaci sent his sons Hong Taiji and Daišan with a banner each to keep Du Song occupied at Jilin Cliff and he himself took six banners and attacked the Sarhu camp.

The Sarhu camp held off the initial Jin assault but fell into an ambush while in pursuit of the enemy and were driven toward the river. Ming musketeers tried to reform ranks and fire their guns but were flanked by Jin cavalry which broke their formation and shattered their morale.

Nurhaci then concentrated all his forces against Du's camp and laid siege to it. Du's forces were completely surrounded and their firearms only made their location more evident to their enemies. Du and the other two generals, Wang Xuan and Zhao Menglin, were killed in combat while trying to occupy a high ground near the river. Du Song died from an arrow supposedly fired by Laimbu, 13th son of Nurhaci. The Jin chased the shattered Ming remnants for 20 li before regrouping to form ranks. Then they headed off to confront Ma Lin's forces at Xiangjiayan.

=== Northern Route ===
Upon receiving news of the Western Route's demise, Ma Lin grew more cautious. He divided his forces in two and together with the remnants of Du Song's army, mainly supply units, formed three fortified camps at Xiangjiayan (Siyanggiyan), protected by cannons and trenches.

Nurhaci concentrated his forces on Ma Lin's own camp. He first sent a contingent of horsemen to scout out their defenses. Then he ordered a thousand infantry to draw fire while Nurhaci led his banners to surround the Ming encampment and conduct a surprise attack. Nurhaci's banners were so rapid that Ma's gunners could only get off one volley before the Jin were upon them. Ming forces panicked and were cut down by Jin cavalry. The rearguard attempted to rally under Pan Zongyan and his Yihe (Jurchen) allies, but this proved futile, and the army's morale broke. Ma Lin escaped as half of his troops were killed or captured. The other two camps also fell in quick succession.

=== Eastern Route ===
Yang Hao issued commands to retreat and regroup, but Liu Ting never received the message.

Nurhaci and Daišan returned to Hetu Ala with 4,000 troops to recuperate.

The Jin decided to attack Liu Ting next, as Li Rubai's forces were mainly traversing mountain paths. Unlike Du Song and Ma Lin, Liu had experienced some small success in defeating advance Jin scouts, resulting in the capture of three fortresses, the death of two Jin generals, as well as 3,000 casualties on the Jin side.

Before he left, Nurhaci ordered some of his troops to disguise themselves as Ming soldiers and mix into Liu Ting's entourage. His spies posed as Du Song's messengers and delivered a false letter to Liu Ting stating that Du Song was already fast approaching Hetu Ala, requesting him to speed up. Liu took the bait and increased the army's pace which caused his troops to lose cohesion as they advanced deep into a valley.

Liu Ting was ambushed in Abudali (阿布達里) Pass, not 60 li away from Hetu Ala, as his troops stretched themselves out to traverse the valley. His forces met Daišan's assault and withstood the first charge, but was shattered in the second charge by Hong Taiji, whose banner inflicted heavy casualties as approximately 3,000 Zhejiang troops and more than 7,000 Hmong troops were killed. Liu Ting died in combat after personally killing several Jin soldiers.

The Joseon force of 10,000 musketeers and 3,000 archers were hindered by the harsh wind. Joseon archers fired volleys without arrowheads because they had not intended to fight the Jin in the first place and wished to maintain a neutral policy between the Later Jin and the Ming. The musketeers however performed admirably and fought until their allies surrendered. Their fortitude was regarded with admiration by the future Qing emperor Hong Taiji. Joseon contingent commander Gang Hong-rip then surrendered with his remaining troops.

=== Southern Route ===
Li Rubai received orders to retreat and withdrew his troop across Ming borders with minimal casualties, only losing a few hundred men in small Jin cavalry attacks. Ming officials claimed that Li Rubai's personal relationship with Nurhaci (both having relations to Li Rubai's father, Li Chengliang) was the reason he was not targeted and would later bring him to trial on this claim. He committed suicide before the trial.

== Aftermath ==
Yang Hao was arrested by the Embroidered Uniform Guard and imprisoned for 10 years before he was executed by Zhu Youjian.

Li Rubai was impeached on the basis of his personal relationship with Nurhaci. He committed suicide before his trial.

Ma Lin retreated to Kaiyuan, where he was captured and killed by the Later Jin when they conquered the city a few months later.

After returning to Hetu Ala, Nurhaci celebrated with his retainers. Thereafter, he sent a messenger to the King of Joseon asking why they had aided the Ming and aired his grievances towards them. Not willing to anger Nurhaci, Joseon returned a letter congratulating him on his victory, but remained ambivalent in official communications with the Later Jin, nor did Joseon recognize his regime.

Two-thirds of the 13,000 Joseon Expeditionary Force were killed, but those who survived as captives were released and allowed to return to their homeland. Gang Hong-rip however was kept for his proficiency in the Jurchen language. Later on Gang would be led to believe that his family had died in the political turmoil that occurred during a coup in his native kingdom of Joseon. To exact his revenge on the Joseon court, he urged the Jin to invade Joseon, which led to the First Manchu invasion of Korea in 1627. Only during the peace negotiations did he find out that he had been misled.

The Joseon musketeers being overwhelmed by the Manchu cavalry prompted a revision of military tactics in Korea. In previous decades, the Imjin War was seen as a demonstration of the dominance of the firearm, and the Joseon adjusted military forces accordingly. Both sides of the war lacked effective shock cavalry to take advantage of the vulnerabilities of unsupported musketeers. After the defeat at Sarhū, the Joseon forces revised their doctrine to have spearmen supporting the musketeers. The new Korean force was tested against the Manchus again in 1627 and 1636-1637. Both times, they were defeated, but their performance left a strong impression on the Manchus. The first emperor of the newly declared Qing dynasty later wrote: "The Koreans are incapable on horseback but do not transgress the principles of the military arts. They excel at infantry fighting."

== Gallery ==
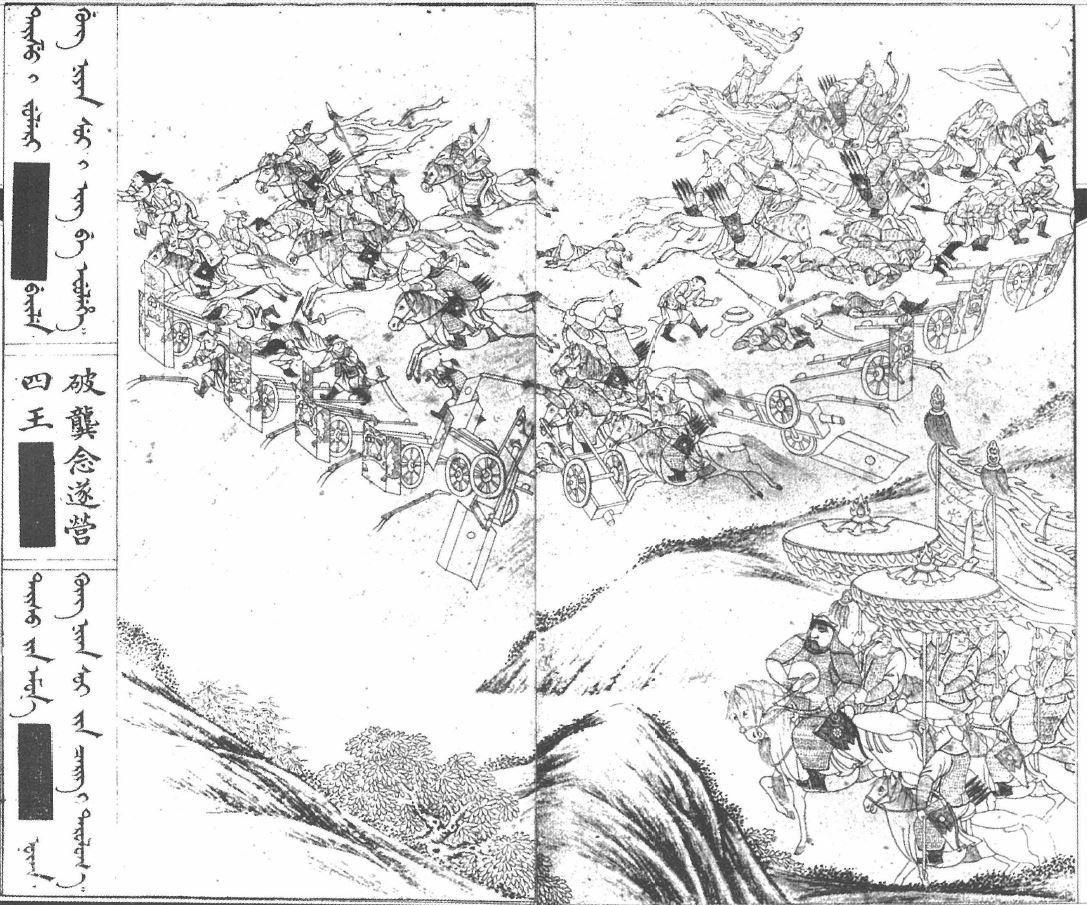
Jin cavalry attacking the Ming camp from the rear

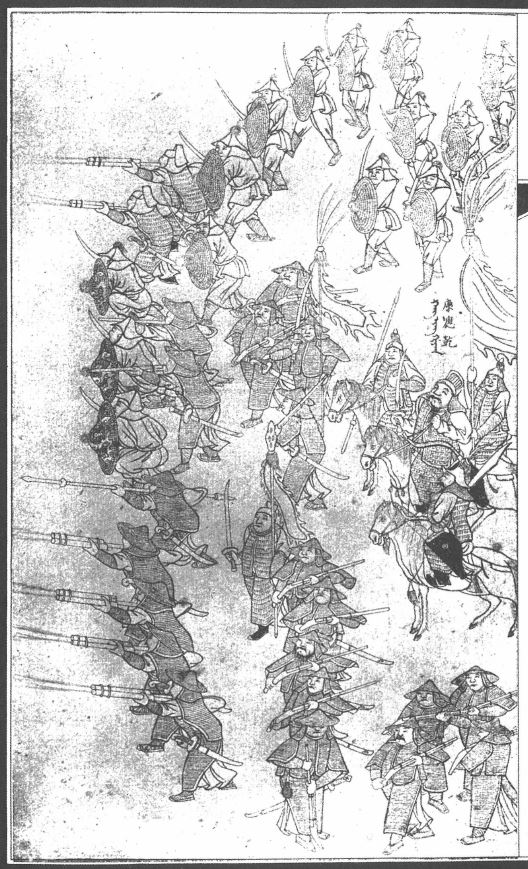
Kang Yingqian being overrun

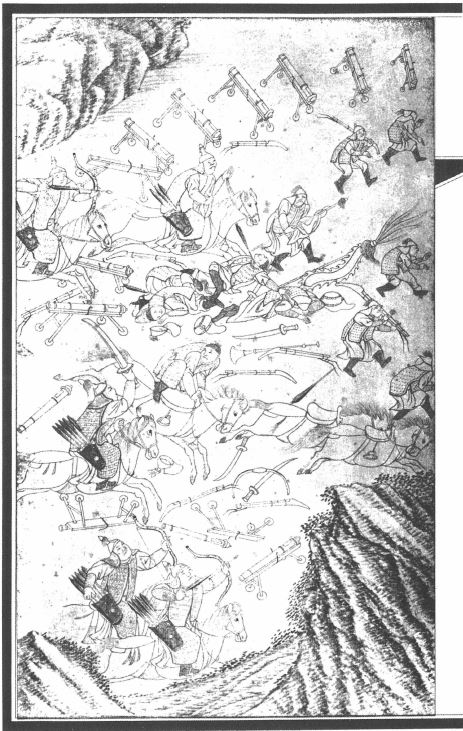
Nurhaci overrunning Ma Lin's camp

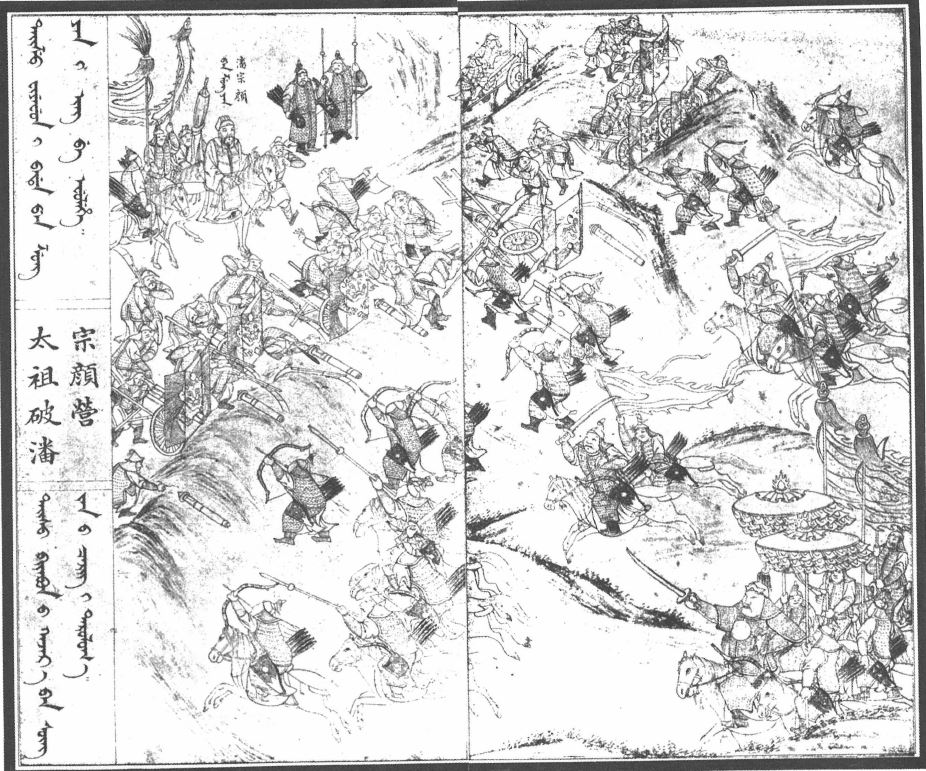
Pan Zongyan being overrun

== See also ==
- Timeline of the Ming dynasty
- Timeline of the Qing dynasty

== Bibliography ==
- Swope, Kenneth (2014), The Military Collapse of China's Ming Dynasty, Routledge
- Wakeman, Frederic (1985), The Great Enterprise: The Manchu Reconstruction of Imperial Order in Seventeenth-Century China, vol. 1, University of California Press
