= Siege of Suncheon =

1598 siege of the Japanese invasion of Korea

- Part of the Japanese invasions of Korea (1592–1598)
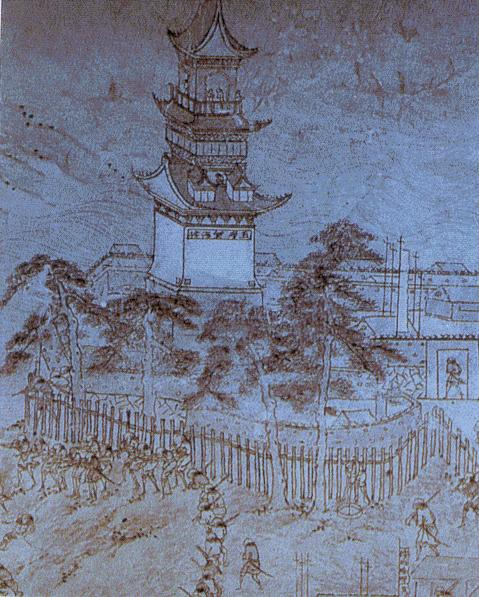
- Donjon of the Suncheon Japanese Castle
Date	20 September – 2 November 1598 (1 month, 1 week and 6 days)
Location	Suncheon Japanese Castle, Southern Korean Peninsula
Result	Japanese victory

Belligerents
Joseon and Ming dynasties	Japanese army

Commanders and leaders
Ming; Liu Ting; Chen Lin; Joseon; Gwon Yul; Yi Sunsin	Konishi Yukinaga

Strength
Ming; 13,600; Joseon; 10,000; Naval forces 20,000 men Total; 43,600	Total; 15,000; 500 Ships

Casualties and losses
>800	?

- Siege of Suncheon
- Hangul: 왜교성 전투
- Hanja: 倭橋城戰鬪
- RR: Waegyoseong jeontu
- MR: Waegyosŏng chŏnt'u

The siege of Suncheon or siege of Japanese fortress was an unsuccessful Korean and Chinese Allied Forces attempt to capture Suncheon Japanese Castle late in the Japanese invasions of Korea (1592–1598).

== Prelude ==
Suncheon was the last wajo stronghold in Korea, housing 13,700–15,000 men and well stocked with food and ammunition. The Japanese army planned to evacuate using the 500 ships in the harbor. The operation against Suncheon involved a combined land and sea effort between the Chinese Western Army and the naval commands of Admiral Yi and his Ming ally Chen Lin. Although the relationship between the two admirals was only sometimes smooth, they cooperated enough for the joint fleet to secure Jang Island. Jang Island was within view of Suncheon Castle and held Japanese equipment and provisions. The fleet then surrounded Suncheon while the Ming Army prepared on land; Liu Ting offered 60 gold pieces to any Chinese soldier who brought him a Japanese head. In a display of military ingenuity, General Liu Ting deployed various Chinese siege engines, including movable shields, siege towers, and ‘cloud ladders,’ to attack Suncheon. These intricate contraptions, taking several days to assemble, were a testament to the meticulous planning and preparation of the combined operation.

== Siege ==
The two forces prepared for an attack at dawn. The naval craft advanced and fought the enemy until noon, causing numerous casualties. The Japanese sallied out, inflicting 800 casualties on the Ming, but failed to break the siege. Initially, they attempted to negotiate peace with Konishi Yukinaga in a ruse to lure him into the open, where he could be killed. Still, it failed when their cannons fired too early, and the Japanese forces returned to the fortress. Konishi tried to delay the attack by sending Liu a female companion the next day, but the allied forces attacked anyway. The allies proceeded to bombard them for three days.

While the navies bombarded Suncheon from the sea, the Chinese soldiers attempted to breach the land walls with siege towers and cloud ladders. However, they faced fierce resistance and were met with accurate arquebus fire. The lack of an alternative plan became evident as the siege engines became useless, and the Chinese had to pull back.

Chen Lin and Yi Sunsin attempted to land but were driven back by Japanese gunfire. They gave up on 21 October. The land and naval forces eventually conducted a joint attack on 31 October. Unfortunately, the land assault failed to move past the first screen of defenses. After three attempts the attack was called off.

Frustrated by the failed land attack, General Liu Ting suggested a night assault on Suncheon from the sea. Admiral Chen Lin, determined to succeed, received reluctant support from Admiral Yi. On 1 November, the Allied fleet bombarded the fortress. The assault, timed to coincide with the incoming tide just after midnight, resulted in a close-range bombardment that knocked out a considerable section of the Japanese fortifications. However, 30 - 39 Chinese ships ran aground as the tide turned, leading the Japanese to believe it was an attempted amphibious landing. This confusion allowed the Japanese to capture five Chinese ships, and only when Admiral Yi's ships came to the rescue were they driven off.

Admiral Yi prepared for his attack, but a strong westerly wind prevented approach for the next two days. General Liu Ting, possibly informed of a simultaneous disaster at Sacheon, retreated north, leading to the evacuation of Suncheon. The siege was lifted on 2 November.

== See also ==
- Battle of Sacheon (1598)
- Second Siege of Ulsan
- Japanese castles in Korea (Waeseong)

== Bibliography ==
- Alagappa, Muthiah (2003), Asian Security Order: Instrumental and Normative Features, Stanford University Press, ISBN 978-0-8047-4629-8
- Arano, Yasunori (2005), The Formation of a Japanocentric World Order, International Journal of Asian Studies
- Brown, Delmer M. (May 1948), "The Impact of Firearms on Japanese Warfare, 1543–1598", The Far Eastern Quarterly, 7 (3): 236–53, doi:10.2307/2048846, JSTOR 2048846, S2CID 162924328
- Eikenberry, Karl W. (1988), "The Imjin War", Military Review, 68 (2): 74–82
- Ha, Tae-hung; Sohn, Pow-key (1977), 'Nanjung Ilgi: War Diary of Admiral Yi Sun-sin, Yonsei University Press, ISBN 978-89-7141-018-9
- Haboush, JaHyun Kim (2016), The Great East Asian War and the Birth of the Korean Nation
- Hawley, Samuel (2005), The Imjin War, The Royal Asiatic Society, Korea Branch/UC Berkeley Press, ISBN 978-89-954424-2-5
- Jang, Pyun-soon (1998), Noon-eu-ro Bo-nen Han-gook-yauk-sa 5: Gor-yeo Si-dae (눈으로 보는 한국역사 5: 고려시대), Park Doo-ui, Bae Keum-ram, Yi Sang-mi, Kim Ho-hyun, Kim Pyung-sook, et al., Joog-ang Gyo-yook-yaun-goo-won. 1998-10-30. Seoul, Korea.
- Kim, Ki-chung (Fall 1999), "Resistance, Abduction, and Survival: The Documentary Literature of the Imjin War (1592–8)", Korean Culture, 20 (3): 20–29
- Kim, Yung-sik (1998), "Problems and Possibilities in the Study of the History of Korean Science", Osiris, 2nd Series, 13: 48–79, doi:10.1086/649280, JSTOR 301878, S2CID 143724260
- 桑田忠親 [Kuwata, Tadachika], ed., 舊參謀本部編纂, [Kyu Sanbo Honbu], 朝鮮の役 [Chousen no Eki] (日本の戰史 [Nihon no Senshi] Vol. 5), 1965.
- Neves, Jaime Ramalhete (1994), "The Portuguese in the Im-Jim War?", Review of Culture, 18: 20–24
- Niderost, Eric (June 2001), "Turtleboat Destiny: The Imjin War and Yi Sun Shin", Military Heritage, 2 (6): 50–59, 89
- Niderost, Eric (January 2002), "The Miracle at Myongnyang, 1597", Osprey Military Journal, 4 (1): 44–50
- Park, Yune-hee (1973), Admiral Yi Sun-shin and His Turtleboat Armada: A Comprehensive Account of the Resistance of Korea to the 16th Century Japanese Invasion, Shinsaeng Press
- Rockstein, Edward D. (1993), Strategic And Operational Aspects of Japan's Invasions of Korea 1592–1598 1993-6-18, Naval War College
- Sadler, A. L. (June 1937), "The Naval Campaign in the Korean War of Hideyoshi (1592–1598)", Transactions of the Asiatic Society of Japan, Second Series, 14: 179–208
- Sansom, George (1961), A History of Japan 1334–1615, Stanford University Press, ISBN 978-0-8047-0525-7
- Sohn, Pow-key (April–June 1959), "Early Korean Painting", Journal of the American Oriental Society, 79 (2): 96–103, doi:10.2307/595851, JSTOR 595851
- Stramigioli, Giuliana (December 1954), "Hideyoshi's Expansionist Policy on the Asiatic Mainland", Transactions of the Asiatic Society of Japan, Third Series, 3: 74–116
- Strauss, Barry (Summer 2005), "Korea's Legendary Admiral", MHQ: The Quarterly Journal of Military History, 17 (4): 52–61
- Swope, Kenneth M. (2006), "Beyond Turtleboats: Siege Accounts from Hideyoshi's Second Invasion of Korea, 1597–1598", Sungkyun Journal of East Asian Studies, 6 (2): 177–206
- Swope, Kenneth M. (2005), "Crouching Tigers, Secret Weapons: Military Technology Employed During the Sino-Japanese-Korean War, 1592–1598", The Journal of Military History, 69: 11–42, doi:10.1353/jmh.2005.0059, S2CID 159829515
- Swope, Kenneth M. (December 2002), "Deceit, Disguise, and Dependence: China, Japan, and the Future of the Tributary System, 1592–1596", The International History Review, 24 (4): 757–1008, doi:10.1080/07075332.2002.9640980, S2CID 154827808
- Swope, Kenneth M. (2009), A Dragon's Head and a Serpent's Tail: Ming China and the First Great East Asian War, 1592–1598, University of Oklahoma Press
- Turnbull, Stephen (2002), Samurai Invasion: Japan's Korean War 1592–98, Cassell & Co, ISBN 978-0-304-35948-6
- Turnbull, Stephen (2008), The Samurai Invasion of Korea 1592-98, Osprey Publishing Ltd
- Turnbull, Stephen (2007), Japanese Castles of Korea 1592-98, Osprey Publishing Ltd
- Turnbull, Stephen (1998), The Samurai Sourcebook, Cassell & Co, ISBN 978-1-85409-523-7
- Villiers, John (1980), SILK and Silver: Macau, Manila and Trade in the China Seas in the Sixteenth Century (A lecture delivered to the Hong Kong Branch of the Royal Asiatic Society at the Hong Kong Club. 10 June 1980). The HKUL Digital Initiatives
- Yi, Min-woong (2004), Imjin Wae-ran Haejeonsa: The Naval Battles of the Imjin War [임진왜란 해전사], Chongoram Media [청어람미디어], ISBN 978-89-89722-49-6
