= Ulsan Castle =

Coordinates: 35°33′16″N 129°20′22″E

- 울산왜성
- Ulsan, Republic of Korea
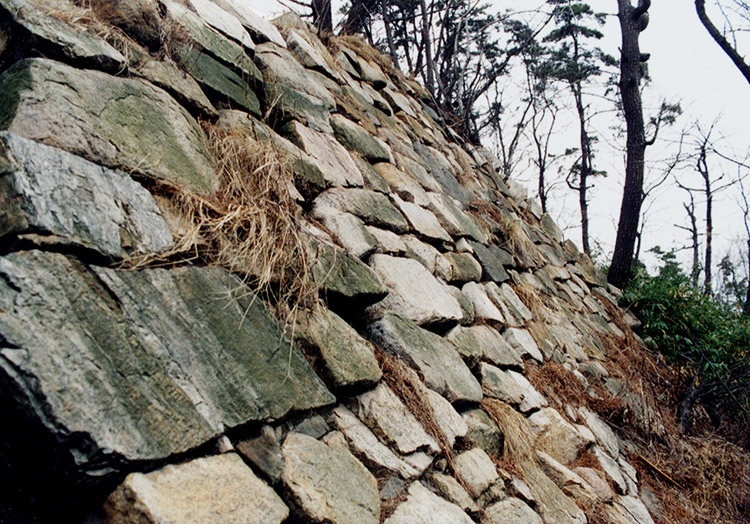

Site information
- Type: Japanese castle (Waeseong)

Location
- Height: 6 m

Site history
- Built: 1597
- Built by: Kato Kiyomasa
- In use: 1593-1598
- Materials: stone, wood, plaster walls

Garrison information
- Past commanders: Kato Kiyomasa, Asano Yoshinaga

- Ulsan Castle
- Hangul: 울산왜성
- Hanja: 蔚山倭城
- Revised Romanization: Ulsan Waeseong
- McCune–Reischauer: Ulsan Waesŏng

Ulsan Castle (울산왜성, 蔚山倭城) is a Japanese style castle in Ulsan, South Korea which was constructed during the Japanese invasions of Korea (Imjin war) by Katō Kiyomasa's army. Today, Ulsan Castle is almost ruined by the city planning of Ulsan.

Ulsan Japanese Castle was excluded from Historic Sites of South Korea on October 30, 1997.

== Characteristics ==
- Yagura (Guard Tower): 12.
- Moats, Gates and other structures
- Date of Construction: November, 1597 (established)
- Founder: Katō Kiyomasa
- Status: The 7th Ulsan monument
- Location: Hakseong-dong, Jung-ju, Ulsan

== See also ==
- Siege of Ulsan
- Japanese castles in Korea
- Suncheon Castle
