= Busanjinseong =

Wall-fortress in Busan, South Korea

Coordinates: 35°08′10″N 129°03′40″E

Branch Wall-fortress in Busanjin 釜山鎭城 부산진성
- Dong-gu, Busan, South Korea
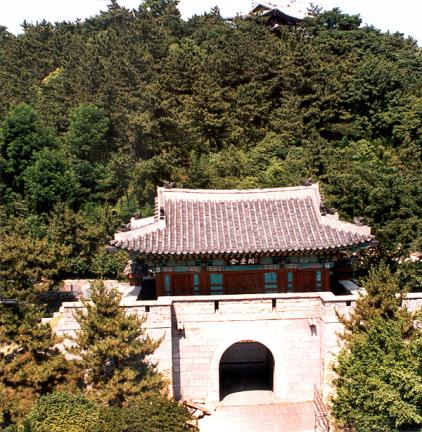
- Jaseongdae in 2020

Site information
- Type: Japanese castle (Waeseong)
- Condition: Reconstructed, serves as historic site

Location
- Height: 1.5-10m

Site history
- Built: 1593, rebuilt 1974
- Built by: Mōri Terumoto (1593)
- In use: 1593–1895
- Materials: stone, wood, plaster walls (original)
- Demolished: 1910 as a result of the order of the demolish to Korea's Fortress by Japanese government.

- Busanjinseong
- Hangul: 부산진성
- Hanja: 釜山鎭城
- RR: Busanjinseong
- MR: Pusanjinsŏng

Jaseongdae
- Hangul: 자성대
- Hanja: 子城臺
- RR: Jaseongdae
- MR: Chasŏngdae

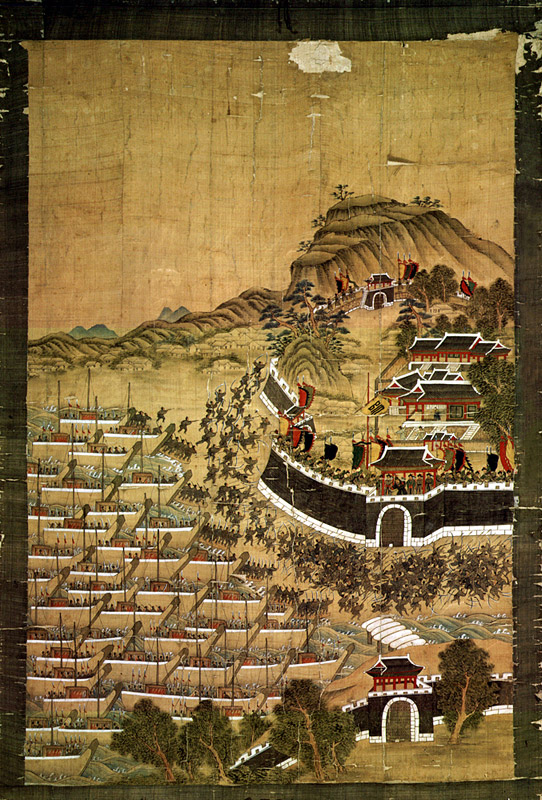
Battle of Busanjin - showing the fortress, its defenders & the massed Japanese fleet

The Branch Wall-fortress in Busanjin (釜山鎭城), also known as Maruyama Castle (丸山城, まるやまじょう) and Konishi Castle (少西城), is located at Beomil-dong, Dong-gu, Busan, South Korea. The existing wall-fortress remains were constructed by the Japanese military during the Imjin War. There are two assertions on the name of Jaseong (Subordinate Castle). One is the wall-fortress on Jeungsan Mountain with Jwacheon-dong as the mother castle and accordingly called Jaseong. The other is that Jaseong was constructed on the mountain top as the General's terrace.

The Busanjinjiseong Fortress was also called Mangongdae in memory of Ming-dynasty General Wan Shide who stayed at Jaseongdae to reinforce the Korean soldiers defending against the Imjin War. The wall-fortress was repaired after General Wan Shide returned home.

== Origin ==
The origin of Jaseongdae was originated from the fact that Busanjinseong Fortress was called Jiseong or Jaseong Fortress, and that Jaseongdae Fortress was made of Jiseong Fortress to form a pole.

It was used as the headquarters of the Gyeongsangjwa-do (western South Gyeongsang navy), which later moved into its present location at the Fortress site of Jwasuyeong. It was also used as the Busanjin Naval Headquarters. The Japanese removed the wall-fortress during their occupation. Around this time, the sea surrounding Jaseongdae was filled in, reducing it; however, it was later repaired.

== History ==
In Busanpo, there were inner and outer fortresses, which surrounded Jeungsan, a mountain behind the main industrial complex, and Jaseungdae was built as an open fortress. During the Japanese Invasion of Korea in 1592, Japanese troops stationed in Busan, rebuilt it as a Japanese barracks. It was also called Soseoseong and Hwansanseong Fortress, and in Japan, it was called Maruyama Castle (丸山城, まるやまじょう) and Konishi Castle (少西城) when Busanjinseong was Busan Japanese Fortress. Even now, Busanjinseong is called 'Maruyama Castle' in Japan. It was used as a command post for the Japanese military. After the Japanese army was driven out, the troops under the command of Mansedeok of the Ming Dynasty stayed, so it was called Mangongdae. After the Japanese Invasion of Korea in 1592, the fortress and Sadaemun Gate were built and the government office were repaired, and it was used as the lodging for the Jwa Do-su Military Preceptor.

The castle is known to have been built in 1593 (the 26th year of King Seonjo's reign), along with the main character of Busanjinseong Fortress, which was located in today's Jeungsan Mountain, as well as the father and son of Mōri Hidemoto, who was in charge of the county government of Gyeongsang Province. Meanwhile, Japanese leader Asano Nagayoshi is believed to have contracted or expanded in 1598 (the 31st year of King Seonjo's reign) during the Japanese invasion of Korea.

Since the original Busan Fortress, which was originally built during the Japanese Invasion of Korea in 1592, was destroyed by the Japanese army, the Joseon Navy started using Jaseongdaeweseong Fortress, the intellectual fortress of Busan, as the Busanjinseong Fortress in 1607 (the 40th year of King Seonjo's reign). According to the Chungnyeolsa Temple Site, the Japanese army built a fortress on the top of the towering mountain in the fortress, which was used as a memorial stone for Busan during the Japanese Invasion of Korea in 1592. Therefore, it is believed that Busanjinseong Fortress was used as a base for Busanjinseong Fortress during the late Joseon Dynasty. In addition, if one looks at Busan Japanese Fortress (Busan Japanese Fortress) as a mother, it can be seen as referring to self-reflection on motherhood as an intellectual. Meanwhile, "Yeongnamjinji" is said to have established Yukwoojeong on top of Jagseong in the year of Imin, and named it Seungga. Therefore, it is recorded that Jagseong became the first generation of Jin and Seunggajeong became the first generation of Jagseong.

== Rename ==
Originally, the name of the cultural property was Busanjinjiseong, but it was changed to Busanjinseong on 15 January 2020.
