= Suncheon Castle =

Castle in Suncheon, South Korea

Coordinates: 34°54′27″N 127°34′52″E

- 순천왜성
- Suncheon, South Korea
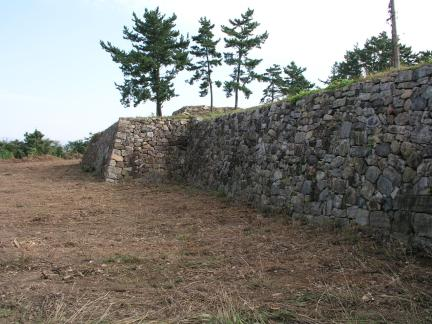

Site information
- Type: Japanese castle (Waeseong)

Location
- Height: 18 m

Site history
- Built: 1597
- Built by: Konishi Yukinaga
- In use: 1593–1598
- Materials: stone, wood, plaster walls

Garrison information
- Past commanders: Konishi Yukinaga, Ukita Hideie, Todo Takatora

Korean name
- Hangul: 순천왜성
- Hanja: 順天倭城
- RR: Suncheon Waeseong
- MR: Sunch'ŏn Waesŏng

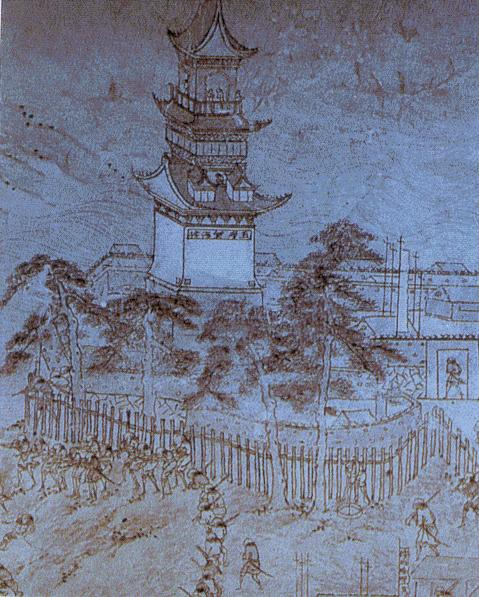
Donjon of Suncheon Japanese Castle

Suncheon Castle, also known as Suncheon Waeseong (Korean: 순천왜성), Japanese name Juntenjō (順天城), is the only remaining Japanese castle in South Jeolla Province, and the battlefield of Yi Sun-sin who tempted Konishi Yukinaga from here to Noryang Point known as Battle of Noryang Point.

== Characteristics ==
- Yagura (Guard Tower) : 3 at least.
- Moats, Gates and other structures.
- Date of Construction : December 2, 1597 (established).
- Founder : Ukita Hideie, Tōdō Takatora.
- Status : The 171st Jeollanamdo monument.
- Area : 188,428 m^{2}.
- Location : Sinseong-ri, Haeryong-myeon, Suncheon, Jeollanam-do.

== History ==
The castle was built by the Japanese generals Ukita Hideie and Tōdō Takatora as an outpost during the second invasion of Korea in 1597. The castle was constructed using mud and stone with a footprint of 120,600 m^{2} for the outside castle (외성) 2502m for the inside castle (내성) 1342m. The site consists of 3 outside mud castles (외곽성; 토석성), 3 main stone castles (본성 석성) and 12 castle gates. It is the only castle preserved among 26 Japanese castles in the southern region.

The Japanese general Konishi Yukinaga stayed in this castle with 14,000 troops to fight on two occasions against Joseon and Ming (China) allied forces.

== See also ==
- Siege of Suncheon
- Suncheon
- Japanese castles in Korea
- Ulsan Japanese Castle
