= Zhang Hao (Tai Chi athlete) =

Chinese Tai chi athlete (born 1993)

- Born: January 22, 1993 (age 33); Jiaozuo, Henan, China
- Native name: 张豪
- Nationality: Chinese
- Height: 1.82 m (5 ft 11 1/2 in)
- Weight: 82 kg (181 lb; 12.9 st)
- Style: Tai chi

Other information
- University: Wuhan Sports University

Zhang Hao (Chinese: 张豪) is a Chinese Tai chi athlete and coach. He was born in Jiaozuo, Henan province, China in 1993.

== Early life and training ==
From a young age, he displayed a passion for martial arts, beginning his training at the age of seven. He practiced various martial arts, including Bajiquan, Changquan, and swordplay. In 2006, Zhang Hao transitioned to Taichi, and over nearly two decades, he has developed extensive expertise in this discipline.

After serving as a professional Taichi athlete for fifteen years, Zhang Hao transitioned to coaching in 2014 and shares his Tai Chi teachings on social media.

== Career achievements ==
- 2013: "National Sports Master" (运动健将) in China.
- 2014: Won the Men’s Optional Taichi Championship at the National Wushu Routine Championships in China.
- 2016: Served as the head coach of the Philippine National Wushu Team, leading his students to success in the 9th Asian Wushu Championships and the 6th World Junior Wushu Championships.
- 2019: Represented the United States National Wushu Team at the 8th World Traditional Wushu Championships, winning the Men’s Chen-style Taichi and Chen-style Taichi Sword championships, along with the team championship, with all six team members being his students.
- 2022: Ranked first in the Tai Chi Quan and Tai Chi Sword categories at the United States of America Wushu Kungfu Federation.
- 2023: Represented the United States at the 2023 Pan American KungFu Championships, winning four gold medals.
- In May 2026, Zhang Hao represented the United States at the 5th World Taijiquan Championships held in Bulgaria, winning two gold medals in the men’s New Chen-style Taijiquan and men’s New Chen-style Taiji Sword events.
