= Liu Hao =

Liu Hao (Chinese: 刘昊 or 刘浩 ) may refer to:

- Liu Hao (canoeist) (born 1993), Chinese sprint canoeist
- Liu Hao (cyclist) (born 1988), Chinese cyclist
- Liu Hao (director) (born 1968), Chinese film director
- Liu Hao (footballer) (born 1996), Chinese footballer
- Liu Hao (shot putter) (born 1968), Chinese shot putter
- Liu Hao (weightlifter) (born 1989), Chinese weightlifter

== See also ==
- Hao Lei (born 1978), Chinese actress and singer, sometimes credited as Hao Liu
