= Kwŏn Yul (general) =

Korean army general (1537–1599)

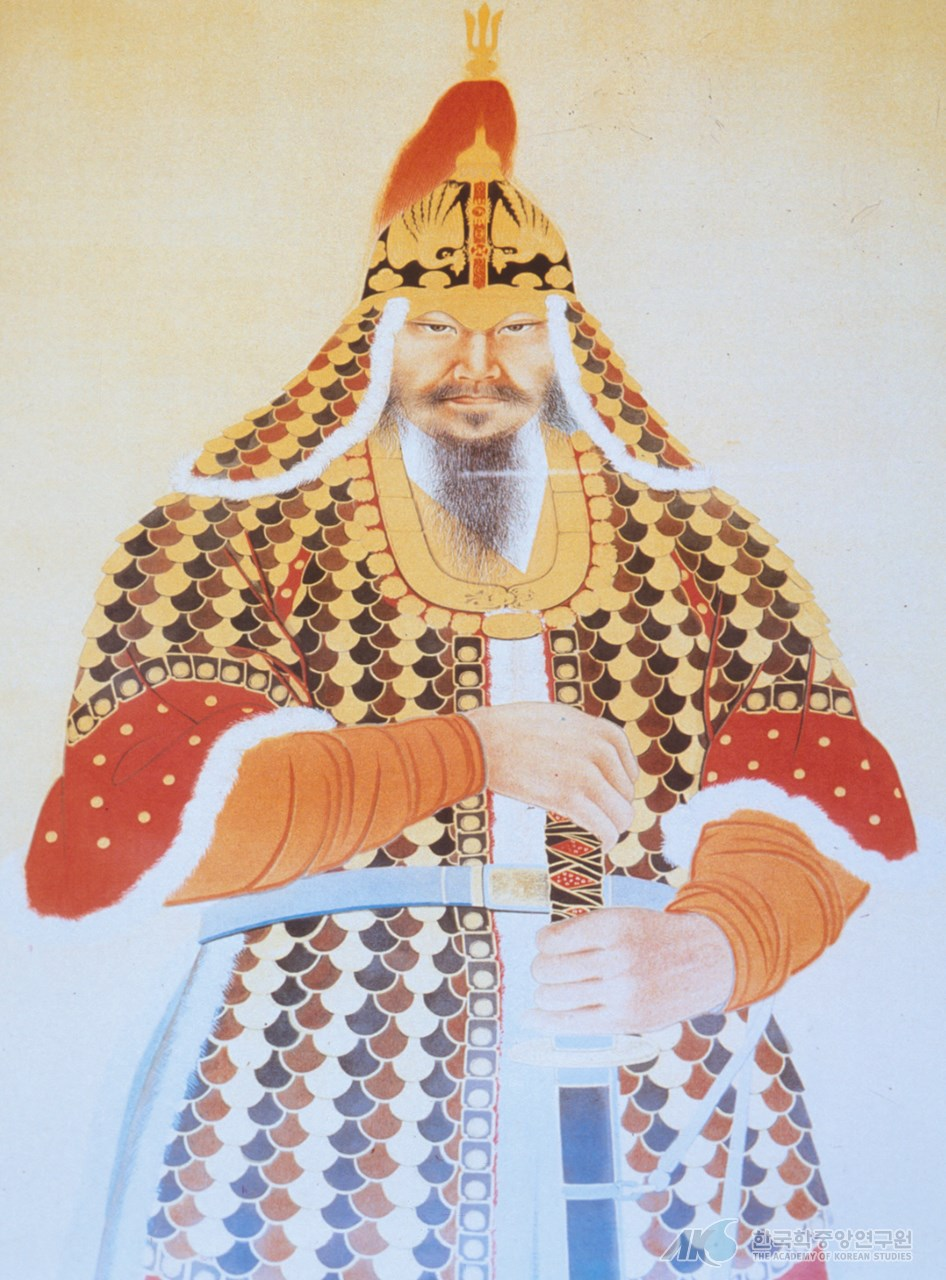
- A portrait of Kwŏn Yul drawn by Jang Woo-sung in 1970
- Born: 28 December 1537; Gyeonggi Province, Joseon
- Died: 6 July 1599 (aged 61); Goyang, Gyeonggi Province, Joseon
- Burial place: Yangju, Gyeonggi Province
- Spouse(s): Lady Cho; Lady Pak
- Children: Lady Kwŏn; Kwŏn Ik-kyung (adopted son)
- Relatives: Kwŏn Cheol (father)
- Military career
- Allegiance: Joseon
- Rank: Dowonsu
- Conflicts: Japanese invasions of Korea (1592–98): Battle of Haengju; Siege of Ulsan; Siege of Suncheon

Korean name
- Hangul: 권율
- Hanja: 權慄
- RR: Gwon Yul
- MR: Kwŏn Yul

Courtesy name
- Hangul: 언신
- Hanja: 彦愼
- RR: Eonsin
- MR: Ŏnsin

Posthumous name
- Hangul: 충장
- Hanja: 忠莊
- RR: Chungjang
- MR: Ch'ungjang

Kwŏn Yul (Korean: 권율; Hanja: 權慄; 28 December 1537 – 6 July 1599) was a Korean army general and the commander-in-chief (도원수; 導元帥) of the Joseon period, who successfully led the Korean forces against Japan during the Japanese invasions of Korea. He is best known for the Battle of Haengju where he defeated an attacking force of about 30,000 Japanese with 2,800 troops.

== Early life ==
Kwŏn Yul hailed from the prestigious Andong Kwŏn clan (안동권씨; 安東權氏); his father, Kwŏn Ch'ŏl (권철), was the yeonguijeong. However, Kwŏn did not begin his political or military career until he was 46. In 1582, he was first appointed to a position in the Korean government and promoted to several different positions including the mayor of Uiju (의주) in 1591.

== During Japanese invasions of Korea ==
When the Japanese forces invaded Korea in 1592, Kwŏn was appointed the mayor of Gwangju, Jeolla province and given the military command of the region. Kwŏn and his troops followed his commander Yi Kwang and headed towards Seoul to join the main force. However, Yi was eventually defeated by Japanese at Yongin. Kwŏn managed to retreat back to Gwangju, and gathered around 1,000 militia.

=== Battle of Ichi ===
When Japanese troops at Geumsan, Jeolla province began to move to Jeonju, Kwŏn moved his army to Ichi (배고개, 이치; 梨峙), a gateway to Jeonju. Ten thousand Japanese troops under Kobayakawa Takakage attacked Ichi. About 1,000 of Kwŏn's men fought and won the battle. Kwŏn supervised his unit by executing deserters personally, and his vanguard commander Hwang Chin (황진; 黃進) kept fighting despite a gunshot injury. The battle resulted in the recapture of the Jeolla province.

=== Siege of Doksan ===
The Joseon Government recognized Kwŏn's heroics, and named him the new governor of the Jeolla province in the following year. Kwŏn then led an army of 10,000 to Gyeonggi Province to recapture Seoul once more, where he was joined by local militia and monks, which enabled Kwŏn to gather up to 20,000 men. Kwŏn's troops were stationed in Doksan Fortress near Suwon. Japanese forces led by Ukita Hideie laid siege to the fort for one month, and Kwŏn's army was running out of water supplies. One day, Kwŏn ordered several war horses to be brought on the fort wall and washed with grains of rice. From a distance, it looked like the horses were bathed with plenty of water. The Japanese, who were waiting for the fort's water supply to run out, lost their spirits and retreated to Seoul. Kwŏn chased the retreating Japanese, inflicting heavy casualties of over 3,000 men. After the war, the king Seonjo built a monument on the top of Doksan named Semadae (세마대; 洗馬臺), "the place where horses were washed", as a tribute to Kwŏn. After the battle, the Joseon government ordered Kwŏn to march northward and combat the Japanese in Seoul.

=== Battle of Haengju ===
Kwŏn and his men set up camp in the run-down fortress of Haengju (행주산성; 幸州山城) near Seoul. Although his forces were joined by local militias led by Kim Ch'ŏnil and monk soldiers led by Ch'ŏyŏng, his entire unit in Haengju was no more than 2,800 men. Threatened by this action, Japanese commanders Katō Kiyomasa and Ukita Hideie, attacked Haengju fortress with 30,000 men, trying to finish off Kwŏn's troops once and for all. Ukita, who never led the attack in the frontline directly, led the Japanese toward the fortress. The Battle of Haengju commenced early in the morning of 12 February 1593. Japanese troops under Kato and Ukita, armed with muskets, surrounded the fortress and launched several massive attacks. However, Kwŏn's forces and the civilians at the fortress resisted heavily, throwing rocks, arrows, iron pellets, burning oil and molten iron at the Japanese. Korean anti-personnel gunpowder weapons called hwachas and explosive cannon shells called heaven-shaking explosive shell (비격진천뢰; 飛擊震天雷) were also utilized in this battle. The Japanese, with over 10,000 casualties and top generals Ukita, Ishida Mitsunari, and Kikkawa Hiroie wounded, were compelled to retreat and fled the region.

=== After the Battle of Haengju ===
After the battle, he kept his position, until the peace talks between Emperor Wanli of Ming Dynasty and Daijō-daijin Toyotomi Hideyoshi began. Then he moved to Jeolla province, and from then on, Kwŏn Yul became the Dowonsu, the Commander-in-chief of Korean forces. He was briefly removed from office due to his harsh treatment of deserters, but was restored back again in the following year. He ordered the Admiral of the Navy, Wŏn Kyun, to battle the Japanese in the Battle of Chilchonryang, which was won by Japanese. However, Admiral Yi Sun-sin was able to defeat the Japanese navy under Todo Takatora in the Battle of Myeongnyang. In 1597, Kwŏn and the Chinese commander Ma Gui planned to combat the Japanese in Ulsan, but the Chinese commander-in-chief ordered Kwŏn to withdraw. Then Kwŏn tried to attack the Japanese in Suncheon, but the idea was again rejected by the Chinese.

== After the war ==
After the war, Kwŏn retired from all of his posts and eventually died on July 6, 1599. After his death, he was given the posthumous title of Yeonguijeong, and awarded the title of the Ildŭng Sŏnmu Kongsin (일등선무공신; 一等宣武功臣) along with Yi Sun-sin and Wŏn Kyun.

== Family ==
Parents

- Father – Kwŏn Ch'ŏl (권철; 權轍; 1503–1578)
- Mother – Lady Cho of the Changnyeong Cho clan (창녕 조씨; 1504–1582)
- Siblings
  - Older brother – Kwŏn Hang (권항; 權恒; 1528–?)
  - Older sister - Lady Kwŏn of the Andong Kwŏn clan (안동 권씨; 1529–?)
  - Older brother – Kwŏn Kae (권개; 權愷; 1530–1568)
  - Older brother – Kwŏn Sun (권순; 權恂; 1536–1606)

Wives and their issues:

- Lady Cho of the Changnyeong Cho clan (창녕 조씨; 1536–1559); daughter of Jo Gwang-won (조광원; 曹輝遠; 1504–?)
  - Daughter – Lady Kwŏn of the Andong Kwŏn clan (안동 권씨; 1559–1627)
- Lady Pak of the Juksan Pak clan (죽산 박씨; 1547 – February 1608); daughter of Pak Se-hyeong (박세형; 1515–?)
  - Adoptive son – Kwŏn Ikgyŏng (권익경; 權益慶; 1572–1637); son of Kwŏn Sun (권순; 1536–1606)

== Popular culture ==
- Portrayed by Nam Kyung-eup in the 2014 film The Admiral: Roaring Currents.

== See also ==
- Military history of Korea
- List of Joseon Dynasty people
- Hideyoshi's invasions of Korea
- Battle of Hangju

== Notes ==
Political offices
Preceded by Kim Myŏngwŏn	Dowonsu of Chosun Dynasty; 1593–1599	Succeeded by Unknown
