= Wang Hao =

Wang Hao may refer to:

== Sports ==
- Wang Hao (swimmer) (born 1962), Chinese
- Wang Hao (table tennis, born 1966), Chinese
- Wang Hao (table tennis, born 1983), Chinese
- Wang Hao (racewalker) (born 1989), Chinese
- Wang Hao (chess player) (born 1989), Chinese chess grandmaster
- Wang Hao (footballer, born 1989), Chinese
- Wang Hao (footballer, born 1993), Chinese
- Wang Hao (diver) (born 1992), Chinese
- Wang Hao (canoeist) (born 1993), Chinese sprint canoeist
- Wang Hao (parathlete) (born 1995), Chinese Paralympic athlete
- Wang Hao (weightlifter), Chinese weightlifter

== Other ==
- Wang Hao (singer) (born 1987), Chinese boy band singer
- Hao Wang (academic) (1921–1995), Chinese American logician, philosopher, and mathematician
- Wang Hao (politician) (born 1963), Chinese politician
- Wang Hao (politician, born 1965) (born 1965), Chinese politician, mayor and party secretary of Suqian, vice chairman of the Zhejiang Provincial Committee of the Chinese People's Political Consultative Conference
- Wang Hao (major general), major general of the People's Liberation Army.
