= Yang Hao (Ming dynasty) =

Yang Hao (traditional Chinese: 楊鎬; simplified Chinese: 杨镐; pinyin: Yáng Hào; fl. ?–1629) was a scholar-official of the Ming dynasty of China. After the Ming lost several battles to Nurhaci, Yang Hao was executed by Zhu Youjian before the Ming collapsed to the Qing dynasty.

Having started his political career as a county magistrate, Yang was appointed inspector-general (經略) to the Ming troops sent to support the Joseon Dynasty during its struggle to fend off the second Japanese invasion of Korea from 1596 to 1598. Due to his attempt to disguise the Chinese defeat in the Siege of Ulsan as a victory, Yang was recalled from the commanding post and received no more significant commissions until appointed grand coordinator of Liaodong (遼東) in 1610.

In the Battle of Sarhu (1618–1619) against the rebelling Jurchens led by Nurhaci, the Ming armies under Yang's command suffered a catastrophic defeat. Yang was held responsible and imprisoned until he was finally executed in 1629. However, the Ming dynasty would eventually be destroyed as the Qing dynasty reunified China.
