= Li Hao =

Li Hao may refer to:

- Li Gao or Li Hao (351–417), Northern Liang official who founded the Western Liang
- Li Hao (Later Shu) (died 965), official of the Former Shu, Later Tang, and Later Shu
- Li Hao, (1977–2014), Chinese murderer and rapist, perpetrator of the Luoyang sexual slavery case
- Hao Li (born 1981), German computer scientist, innovator, and entrepreneur
- Li Hao (footballer, born 1992), Chinese footballer
- Li Hao (fencer) (born 1994), Chinese wheelchair fencer
- Li Hao (footballer, born 2004), Chinese footballer
