= Siege of Ulsan =

1598 siege

First siege of Ulsan
- Part of the Imjin War
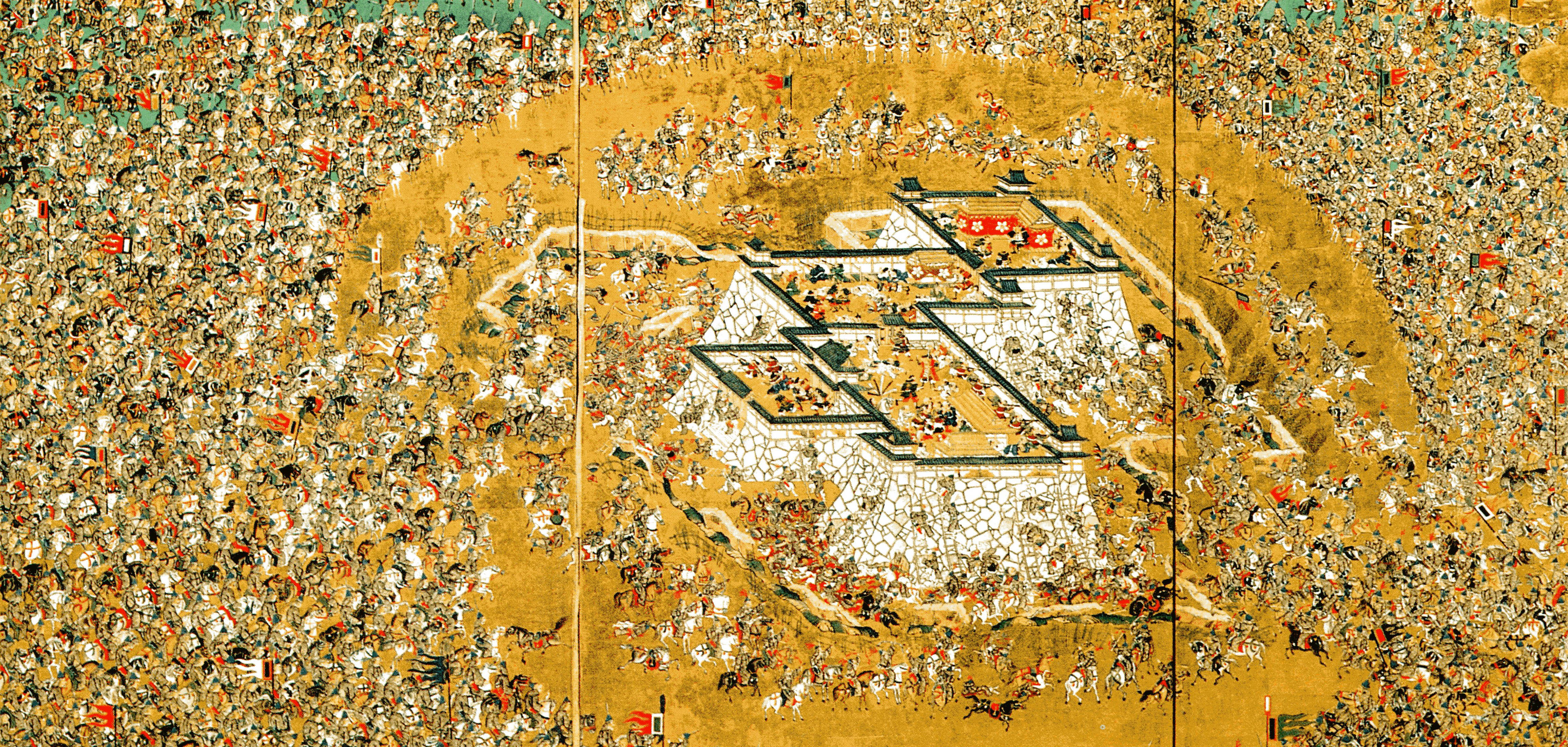
- Joseon and Ming dynasty soldiers assault the Japanese-built fortress at Ulsan
Date	29 January – 19 February 1598
Location	Ulsan Japanese Castle, Ulsan, Southern Korean Peninsula
Result	Withdrawal of Korean and Ming Forces

Belligerents
Joseon and Ming dynasty	Japanese army

Commanders and leaders
Ming: Yang Hao; Ma Gui; Joseon: Gwon Yul	Ulsan castle Katō Kiyomasa; Asano Yoshinaga; Reinforcements; Mōri Hidemoto; Nabeshima Naoshige; Hachisuka Iemasa; Kuroda Nagamasa

Strength
Ming: 40,000; Joseon: 10,000	Ulsan castle: 10,000 – 23,000; Reinforcements: 13,000

Casualties and losses
1,621 killed 2,908 wounded	~9,000 – 20,000+

The siege of Ulsan (Korean: 울산성 전투; Hanja: 蔚山城戰鬪; MR: Ulsansŏng chŏnt'u) was an unsuccessful Ming-Joseon attempt to capture Ulsan from the Japanese. The siege lasted from 26 January to 19 February 1598.

== Background ==
Yang Hao, Ma Gui, and Gwon Yul met up at Gyeongju on the 26 January 1598 and marched on Ulsan with an army of 50,000.

== Battle ==
The allied army reached Ulsan on 29 January.

The battle began with a false retreat that lured the Japanese garrison into a frontal attack. They were defeated with 500 losses and were forced to retreat to Tosan fortress. The allies occupied the city of Ulsan.

On 30 January the allies bombarded the fortress and then took the outer wall of Tosan. The Japanese abandoned much of their food supplies and retreated into the inner fortress. The allies assaulted the inner fortress, at one point even taking a portion of the wall, but suffered heavy casualties. Their cannons were of no help since the fortress was situated too high to reach. Eventually the attack was called off, and a long siege began.

On 19 February the allied forces attacked again and were repelled. Seeing Japanese reinforcements arrive, Yang Hao decided to lift the siege and withdraw.

== Aftermath ==
Joseon and Ming forces losses according to Ming sources numbered 798 killed at the battle and a further 823 dead by injuries for a total of 1,621 dead. The wounded reached 2,908.

According to Hawley, the Japanese garrison at Ulsan Castle numbered 10,000 men, with less than 1,000 surviving the siege. Two Japanese historical sources claim the Japanese garrison numbered either 20,000 or 23,000.

== Bibliography ==
- Alagappa, Muthiah (2003), Asian Security Order: Instrumental and Normative Features, Stanford University Press, ISBN 978-0-8047-4629-8
- Arano, Yasunori (2005), The Formation of a Japanocentric World Order, International Journal of Asian Studies
- Brown, Delmer M. (May 1948), "The Impact of Firearms on Japanese Warfare, 1543–1598", The Far Eastern Quarterly, 7 (3): 236–53, doi:10.2307/2048846, JSTOR 2048846, S2CID 162924328
- Eikenberry, Karl W. (1988), "The Imjin War", Military Review, 68 (2): 74–82
- Ha, Tae-hung; Sohn, Pow-key (1977), 'Nanjung Ilgi: War Diary of Admiral Yi Sun-sin, Yonsei University Press, ISBN 978-89-7141-018-9
- Haboush, JaHyun Kim (2016), The Great East Asian War and the Birth of the Korean Nation
- Hawley, Samuel (2005), The Imjin War, The Royal Asiatic Society, Korea Branch/UC Berkeley Press, ISBN 978-89-954424-2-5
- Jang, Pyun-soon (1998), Noon-eu-ro Bo-nen Han-gook-yauk-sa 5: Gor-yeo Si-dae (눈으로 보는 한국역사 5: 고려시대), Park Doo-ui, Bae Keum-ram, Yi Sang-mi, Kim Ho-hyun, Kim Pyung-sook, et al., Joog-ang Gyo-yook-yaun-goo-won. 1998-10-30. Seoul, Korea.
- Kim, Ki-chung (Fall 1999), "Resistance, Abduction, and Survival: The Documentary Literature of the Imjin War (1592–8)", Korean Culture, 20 (3): 20–29
- Kim, Yung-sik (1998), "Problems and Possibilities in the Study of the History of Korean Science", Osiris, 2nd Series, 13: 48–79, doi:10.1086/649280, JSTOR 301878, S2CID 143724260
- 桑田忠親 [Kuwata, Tadachika], ed., 舊參謀本部編纂, [Kyu Sanbo Honbu], 朝鮮の役 [Chousen no Eki] (日本の戰史 [Nihon no Senshi] Vol. 5), 1965.
- Neves, Jaime Ramalhete (1994), "The Portuguese in the Im-Jim War?", Review of Culture, 18: 20–24
- Niderost, Eric (June 2001), "Turtleboat Destiny: The Imjin War and Yi Sun Shin", Military Heritage, 2 (6): 50–59, 89
- Niderost, Eric (January 2002), "The Miracle at Myongnyang, 1597", Osprey Military Journal, 4 (1): 44–50
- Park, Yune-hee (1973), Admiral Yi Sun-shin and His Turtleboat Armada: A Comprehensive Account of the Resistance of Korea to the 16th Century Japanese Invasion, Shinsaeng Press
- Rockstein, Edward D. (1993), Strategic And Operational Aspects of Japan's Invasions of Korea 1592–1598 1993-6-18, Naval War College
- Sadler, A. L. (June 1937), "The Naval Campaign in the Korean War of Hideyoshi (1592–1598)", Transactions of the Asiatic Society of Japan, Second Series, 14: 179–208
- Sansom, George (1961), A History of Japan 1334–1615, Stanford University Press, ISBN 978-0-8047-0525-7
- Sohn, Pow-key (April–June 1959), "Early Korean Painting", Journal of the American Oriental Society, 79 (2): 96–103, doi:10.2307/595851, JSTOR 595851
- Stramigioli, Giuliana (December 1954), "Hideyoshi's Expansionist Policy on the Asiatic Mainland", Transactions of the Asiatic Society of Japan, Third Series, 3: 74–116
- Strauss, Barry (Summer 2005), "Korea's Legendary Admiral", MHQ: The Quarterly Journal of Military History, 17 (4): 52–61
- Swope, Kenneth M. (2006), "Beyond Turtleboats: Siege Accounts from Hideyoshi's Second Invasion of Korea, 1597–1598", Sungkyun Journal of East Asian Studies, 6 (2): 177–206
- Swope, Kenneth M. (2005), "Crouching Tigers, Secret Weapons: Military Technology Employed During the Sino-Japanese-Korean War, 1592–1598", The Journal of Military History, 69: 11–42, doi:10.1353/jmh.2005.0059, S2CID 159829515
- Swope, Kenneth M. (December 2002), "Deceit, Disguise, and Dependence: China, Japan, and the Future of the Tributary System, 1592–1596", The International History Review, 24 (4): 757–1008, doi:10.1080/07075332.2002.9640980, S2CID 154827808
- Swope, Kenneth M. (2009), A Dragon's Head and a Serpent's Tail: Ming China and the First Great East Asian War, 1592–1598, University of Oklahoma Press
- Turnbull, Stephen (2002), Samurai Invasion: Japan's Korean War 1592–98, Cassell & Co, ISBN 978-0-304-35948-6
- Turnbull, Stephen (2008), The Samurai Invasion of Korea 1592-98, Osprey Publishing Ltd
- Turnbull, Stephen (1998), The Samurai Sourcebook, Cassell & Co, ISBN 978-1-85409-523-7
- Villiers, John (1980), SILK and Silver: Macau, Manila and Trade in the China Seas in the Sixteenth Century (A lecture delivered to the Hong Kong Branch of the Royal Asiatic Society at the Hong Kong Club. 10 June 1980). The HKUL Digital Initiatives
- Yi, Min-woong (2004), Imjin Wae-ran Haejeonsa: The Naval Battles of the Imjin War [임진왜란 해전사], Chongoram Media [청어람미디어], ISBN 978-89-89722-49-6
