= Chang Hao (historian) =

Taiwanese historian and sinologist (1936–2022)

- 張灝
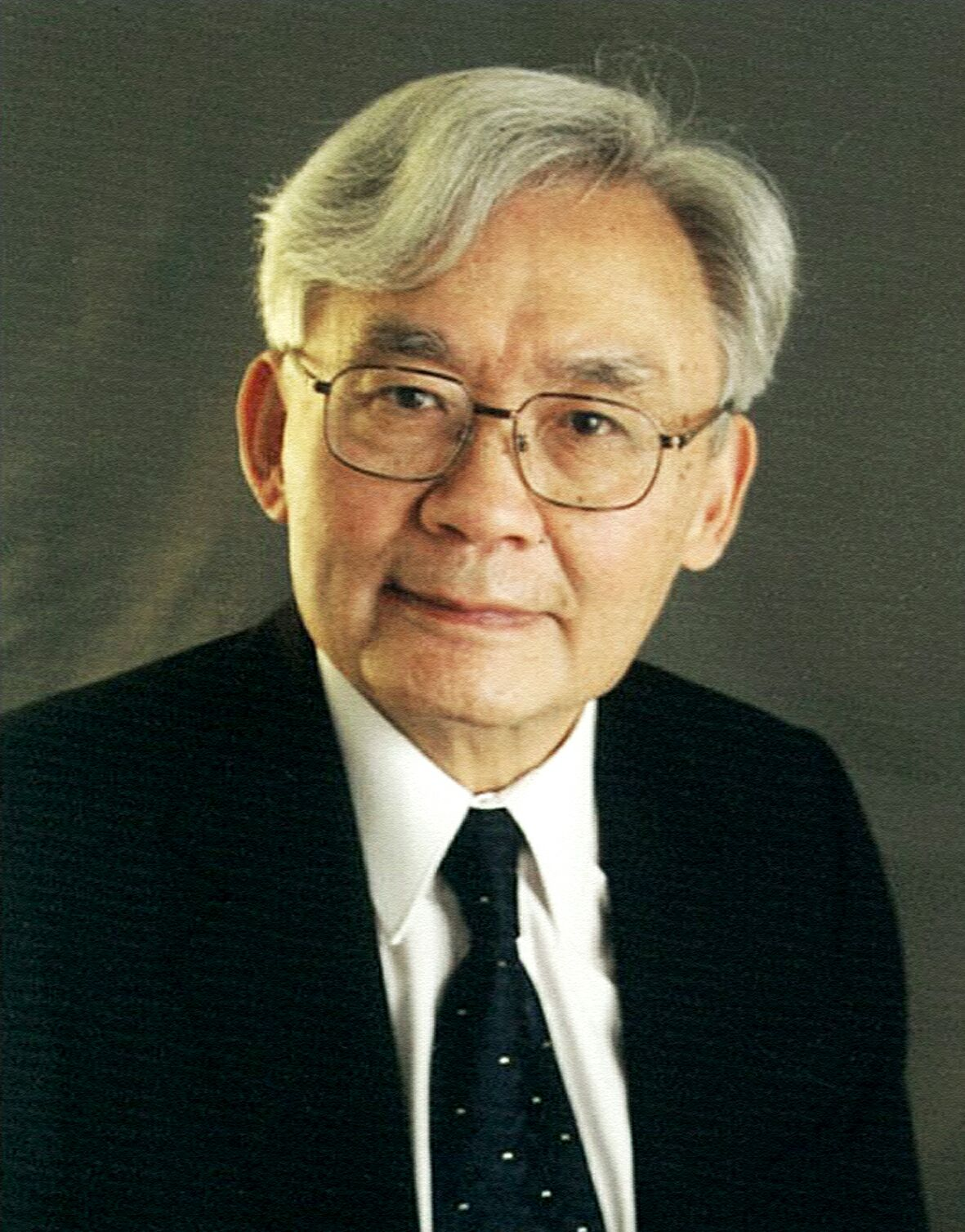
- Born: 30 April 1936; Xiamen, China
- Died: 21 April 2022 (aged 85); Albany, California, U.S.
- Education: National Taiwan University (BA); Harvard University (MA, PhD)
- Scientific career
- Fields: Sinology
- Thesis: Liang Ch'i-ch'ao's early intellectual life, 1873-1903 (1967)
- Doctoral advisor: Benjamin I. Schwartz; Yang Lien-sheng

Chang Hao (Chinese: 張灝; 30 April 1936 – 21 April 2022) was a Taiwanese historian and sinologist who was an authority on Chinese intellectualism and Chinese political thought. He was a professor at Ohio State University and the Hong Kong University of Science and Technology.

== Early life and education ==
Chang was born in Xiamen, Fujian, on April 30, 1936, to Wang hui-fen and Chang Ching-chen. Due to the Chinese Civil War, the family fled to Chongqing and then Nanjing before migrating to Taiwan in 1949 during the Great Retreat.

After graduating from Cheng Kung Senior High School, Chang enrolled at National Taiwan University, where he studied under author Yin Haiguang, and received a Bachelor of Arts in history in 1957. He then earned a Master of Arts (M.A.) in 1961 and his Ph.D. in 1966 from Harvard University, where he completed his doctorate under sinologists Benjamin I. Schwartz and Yang Lien-sheng. His doctoral dissertation was titled, "Liang Ch'i-ch'ao's early intellectual life, 1873-1903".

== Academic career ==
Chang began his teaching career at Louisiana State University in 1964, then moved to Ohio State University in 1968, and joined the Hong Kong University of Science and Technology faculty in 1998, eventually retiring in 2004, and relocating to Reston, Virginia, the following year. Chang was elected an academician of Academia Sinica in 1992, and affiliated with the Academia Sinica's Institute of History and Philology as a corresponding research fellow. In 2022, Chang donated his papers and books to Taiwan's National Central Library.

Chang Hao was married to Liao Jung-jung from 1964 to her death in 2019, of Alzheimer's disease. In later life, Chang was also diagnosed with Alzheimer's, and moved to California to be nearer to one of his daughters. Chang died in Albany, California, aged 85, on 21 April 2022.

== Personal life and death ==
Chang died on April 21, 2022, in Albany, California.

== Selected books ==
- Chang, Hao (1971). Liang Ch'i-ch'ao and Intellectual Transition in China, 1890-1907. Harvard University Press. ISBN 9780674530096.
- Chang, Hao (1987). Chinese Intellectuals in Crisis: Search for Order and Meaning, 1890-1911. University of California Press. ISBN 9780520053786.
