= Chen Hao (baseball) =

Chinese baseball player (born 1990)

- Outfielder
- Born: February 21, 1990 (age 36); China
- Bats: Left Throws: Left

Chen Hao (simplified Chinese: 陈浩; traditional Chinese: 陳浩; pinyin: Chén Hào; born 21 February 1990 in China) is a Chinese baseball outfielder for the Jiangsu Hopestars. He was a member of the China national baseball team competing in the 2009 World Baseball Classic.
