= Pak Hong =

Korean military leader (1534–1593)

- 박홍
- Born: 1534; Taehŭng, Joseon
- Died: 1593 (aged 58–59)
- Burial place: Yesan, South Korea
- Military career
- Allegiance: Joseon
- Conflicts: Imjin War; Battle of Dadaejin; Siege of Dongnae; Battle of Sosan; Battle of Imjin River

Korean name
- Hangul: 박홍
- Hanja: 朴泓
- RR: Bak Hong
- MR: Pak Hong

Courtesy name
- Hangul: 청원
- Hanja: 淸源
- RR: Cheongwon
- MR: Ch'ŏngwŏn

Pak Hong (Korean: 박홍; Hanja: 朴泓; 1534—1593) was a Korean military leader of the mid-Joseon period. Born in 1534, Pak Hong passed the military examination in 1556 and was appointed as a Military Inspector. He held a series of provincial posts, including Assistant Magistrate of Kanggye, Chongpyong, and Chongsŏng. By 1592, he had risen to the position of Provincial Naval Commander of Left Gyeongsang just as the Imjin War erupted.

When the Japanese invaded, he confronted the enemy's vanguard but, faced with overwhelming odds, burned his main camp and retreated to Chungnyŏng. Upon learning that Choryŏng had also fallen, he withdrew toward the capital. On his way to the royal court-in-exile, he encountered Supreme Commander Kim Myŏngwŏn, who appointed him Left Division Commander. Pak then participated in the defense of the Imjin River and engaged the Japanese force at Paju, but was defeated and fled to Pyongyang.

After arriving in Pyongyang, he was impeached by officials for abandoning his post and violating military discipline. However, the charges were dropped in light of the wartime situation and his continued service during the retreat. When Pyongyang fell, he joined Yi Il in Pyongsan to rally troops. Soon after, he was assigned to escort the Crown Prince Gwanghae from Icheon to Songchon and was appointed Right Division Commander and Commander of the Volunteer Forces.

He returned to the Pyongyang front and fought in several engagements, though without notable distinction. After the city was retaken in early 1593, he continued operations as far as Paju with Kim Myŏngwŏn. His chronic illness recurred during the campaign, and he died on his way home for treatment. He was posthumously granted Vice Minister of War and further elevated to Minister of War.

== Early life and career ==
Pak Hong was born in 1534 in Taehŭng-hyŏn (대흥; 大興), Chungcheong Province. His father, Pak Yŏngmu, had served as an Assistant Administrator (별제; 別提), and his mother was a daughter of Chŏng In'gŏl. In 1556, Pak passed the military service examination and was subsequently appointed Military Inspector (선전관; 宣傳官). He later held various posts, including Assistant Magistrate (판관; 判官) of Kanggye, Administrative Assistant (판관; 判官) of the Office of Palace Procurement (내자시; 內資寺), Magistrate of Isan (이산; 理山), and Inspector (도사; 都事) of the Office of the Royal Sons-in-Law (의빈부; 儀賓府). During his tenure as Magistrate of Chongpyong, he received multiple commendations, though he was dismissed after five years.

In 1572, when banditry erupted in the Haeseo region, Pak was recommended for appointment as Magistrate of Pyongsan to oversee the path of an incoming Ming diplomatic mission. Following his mother's death, he temporarily withdrew from public service to observe the mourning period. He later served as Magistrate of Yeongam, staff officer (낭청; 郎廳) of the Border Defense Council, Subarea Commander (만호; 萬戶) of Ch'ŏnsŏng (천성; 天城), and then Garrison Commander (첨사; 僉使) of Busan.

After a posting as Garrison Commander of Manpo in 1580, he was appointed Magistrate of Chongsong in 1583. When unrest broke out among Jurchen groups in the northern region, he promptly assumed his post, suppressed the revolt, and rescued local inhabitants. He further strengthened the region's defenses by repairing the fortress, equipping weaponry, and training troops. He subsequently served as Military Protector (호군; 護軍), as well as Magistrate of Tŏgwŏn. In 1587, following the death of his father, he retired from office.

== Imjin War ==
=== Outbreak of the Imjin War ===
After completing his mourning period, Pak Hong was appointed Provincial Naval Commander (수군절도사; 水軍節度使) of Left Gyeongsang. On the 14th day of the 4th month in 1592, the Imjin War began with the Japanese assault on Busan. Pak promptly submitted a formal dispatch to the royal court, becoming the first to report the outbreak of hostilities.

Although tasked with leading naval operations against the Japanese forces, Pak was unable to mount effective resistance and ultimately retreated in the face of overwhelming opposition. Several factors contributed to this outcome: the naval forces under his command had not been placed on proper defensive alert, and the Japanese invasion—far exceeding the scale of previous waegu (Japanese pirates) incursions—was launched as a surprise attack. These conditions rendered organized resistance highly difficult.

As the Japanese forces advanced from the captured stronghold of Busanjin toward Dongnae and the Naval Headquarters of Left Gyeongsang, Pak ordered the destruction of naval vessels, provisions, and military supplies at the base to prevent their capture. Pak Hong's initial actions were subject to criticism. Kim Sŏngil, serving as Ch'oyusa (초유사; 招諭使) of Right Gyeongang Province, remarked that "Left Naval Commander Pak Hong abandoned the fortress without discharging even a single arrow." Likewise, the Office of the Inspector-General recommended that Pak Hong be punished according to the law.

Pak preserved the remaining troops in the vicinity and transitioned to land-based operations. Leading these forces, Pak departed from the Naval Headquarters and arrived at Sosan Post Station (소산역; 蘇山驛), where Yi Kak had already established a defensive encampment. The two commanders advanced together to the immediate rear of Dongnae Fortress but were repelled by Japanese reserve forces and forced to fall back to Sosan. On the afternoon of the 15th, Pak Chin, the Magistrate of Miryang, arrived with reinforcements, intending to relieve the fortress. However, their combined attempt to confront the Japanese vanguard—now occupying Dongnae—was unsuccessful, and Pak Hong withdrew once more. He later regrouped with Yi Kak in Eonyang, but as the Japanese continued their advance, Pak retreated further to Gyeongju.

=== Advance northward ===
At Gyeongju, Pak Hong disbanded the remaining naval forces of the Left Gyeongsang Naval Command and withdrew with Song Ŭnggil (성응길; 成應吉) and Pak Chongnam (박종남; 朴宗男) to defend Chungnyŏng Pass (죽령; 竹嶺). Upon hearing that Choryŏng Pass (조령; 鳥嶺) had fallen to the enemy, he proceeded toward Hansŏng. While en route in search of King Seonjo's temporary court, which had relocated from the capital, Pak encountered Supreme Commander Kim Myŏngwŏn, who appointed him Left Division Commander. He subsequently participated in the defense of the Imjin River.

At Paju, Pak engaged Japanese forces alongside Sin Hal and Yu Kŭngnyang (유극량; 劉克良). However, their forces were defeated; Sin Hal and Yu Kŭngnyang were killed in action, and only Pak managed to retreat to the Imjin River. When the lower Imjin River defenses collapsed, Pak withdrew to Pyongyang with Kim Myŏngwŏn to defend Taedong River and assumed the role of Auxiliary Defense Commander (조방장; 助防將).

Upon arrival, he was impeached by the Office of Inspector-General and other officials on charges of dereliction of duty and breach of military discipline, citing his failure to hold territory and unauthorized withdrawal. Nevertheless, in view of the wartime circumstances and his continuous presence on the battlefield during the retreat, he was ultimately not punished. This cycle—receiving appointments only to be impeached and demoted to the rank of a common soldier—repeated three times over the course of the war.

=== Death ===
Following the fall of Pyongyang, Pak regrouped with Yi Il at Pyongsan to recruit troops. He was then summoned by Crown Prince Gwanghae, who was stationed in Icheon, and entered Songchon escorting him as Right Division Commander. Pak also served as Commander of the Volunteer Corps (의용도대장; 義勇都大將), participating in various military operations around the Pyongyang area. After the recapture of Hansŏng by Joseon forces in the first month of 1593, he continued to accompany Kim Myŏngwŏn to Paju. However, while returning home for medical treatment due to a relapse of a chronic illness, Pak died en route.

== Legacy ==
Pak Hong's tomb is located in Yesan County. His epitaph was composed by Kim Sanghŏn. He was posthumously promoted to Vice Minister (참판; 參判) of War. Later, following the meritorious service of his eldest son, Pak Chinnam (박진남; 朴震男), who was recommended for recognition as a Ch'ŏngnan Kongsin (청난공신; 淸難功臣), Pak Hong was further posthumously elevated to Minister of War and concurrently Deputy Director (지사; 知事) of the State Tribunal.
