= Kim Yŏn'gwang =

Korean scholar-official (1524–1592)

- 김연광
- Born: 1524
- Died: 5th day, 6th month of 1592; Hoeyang, Joseon
- Cause of death: Killed in action
- Military career
- Allegiance: Joseon
- Conflicts: Imjin War; Battle of Hoeyang †

Korean name
- Hangul: 김연광
- Hanja: 金鍊光
- RR: Gim Yeongwang
- MR: Kim Yŏn'gwang

Art name
- Hangul: 송암
- Hanja: 松巖
- RR: Songam
- MR: Songam

Courtesy name
- Hangul: 언정
- Hanja: 彦精
- RR: Eonjeong
- MR: Ŏnjŏng

Kim Yŏn'gwang (Korean: 김연광; Hanja: 金鍊光; 1524 – 5th day, 6th month of 1592) was a Korean scholar-official and military leader of the mid-Joseon period. Born 1524, Kim passed the triennial state civil service examination in 1555 and began his career in government as a Confucian instructor. He served various posts in both central and local offices.

At the outbreak of the Imjin War in 1592, Kim was appointed Magistrate of Hoeyang, where most officials and troops had already fled. When the Fourth Japanese Division under Mōri Katsunobu reached Hoeyang on 5th day, 6th month of 1592, Kim refused to abandon his post and chose to confront the Japanese invasion. Despite the Japanese army's attempts to force his surrender, Kim remained defiant and was ultimately killed in action alongside his wife.

In recognition of his loyalty and sacrifice, the court posthumously appointed him Vice Minister of the Ministry of Rites and associate director of Ŭigŭmbu He was later enshrined at Sungjŏlsa Temple in Kaesong.

== Early life and career ==
Kim Yŏn'gwang was born in 1524 to Kim Isang (김이상; 金履祥) and a lady of the Gyeongju Yi clan. He passed the Literary Licentiate Examination (진사시; 進士試) in 1549, and in 1555, he passed the triennial state civil service examination (식년시; 式年試) with third-tier honors (병과; 丙科), thereby entering government service.

His first official appointment was as a Confucian instructor (교수; 敎授) in Songchon, Pyongan Province. He subsequently held a number of posts in central government institutions, including Copyist (정자; 正字) of the Office of Printing Books (교서관; 校書館), Registrar (주부; 主簿) of the Office of Royal Ceremonies (봉상시; 奉常寺), Editor (교리; 校理) at the Sŭngmunwŏn, Office of Special Advisors, and Director (서령; 署令) of the Office of Sajikdan Management (사직서; 社稷署) and Vice Director (첨정; 僉正) of the Office of State Rituals (제용감; 濟用監).

In addition to his central appointments, Kim served as magistrate in various local jurisdictions, including Buyeo, Ongjin, Onyang, Pongsan, and Pyeongchang, where he oversaw regional administration. He was recognized for his literary talent, moral integrity, and upright conduct. His reputation earned him the respect of the prominent statesman Yun Tusu, who reportedly visited Kim's residence and entered into a sworn fraternal relationship with him.

== Imjin War ==
Following the outbreak of the Imjin War in the 4th month of 1592, Japanese forces entered Seoul on 2nd day of the 5th month. King Seonjo had departed the capital in the early morning of 30th day of the 4th month, evacuating through Kaesong and Pyongyang before reaching Uiju. In the context of the national crisis, the central government mobilized experienced local officials to support wartime administration. Kim Yŏn'gwang was appointed Magistrate of Hoeyang in recognition of his prior administrative performance as Magistrate of Pyeongchang.

Hoeyang held strategic importance as a key junction between Kangwon and Hamgyong province. Following the occupation of Seoul, the Japanese Second Division under Katō Kiyomasa advanced toward Hamgyong, while the Fourth Division led by Mōri Katsunobu moved into Kangwon Province.

=== Battle of Hoeyang ===
At the time of Kim Yŏn'gwang's appointment, Hoeyang Fortress was effectively undefended. Most officials and troops had already withdrawn, leaving the fortifications and moats in a state of disrepair, while weapons and equipment were abandoned and rendered unusable. Despite these unfavorable conditions, Kim undertook immediate efforts to restore public morale, secure arms and provisions, and prepare the city for defense.

Less than ten days after his arrival, on 5th day, 6th month of 1592, Japanese forces under Mōri Katsunobu reached the fortress. After scout troops returned from defeat, Kim assumed direct command of the defense. The Japanese encircled the fortress and launched attacks along the walls, employing arquebuses. As the situation deteriorated, a subordinate commander urged Kim to retreat and preserve his life for future service. Kim declined, stating that "it is the duty of a subject to serve the nation before preserving his own life."

=== Death ===
As the fortress was breached and the battle turned decisively in favor of the attackers, Kim Yŏn'gwang donned his official court robes and seated himself at the main gate. There, he composed a farewell poem in anticipation of death. He instructed his wife, Lady Ch'oe of the Jeonju Ch'oe clan, to flee for safety, but she refused, reportedly declaring, "If my husband chooses to die a loyal subject, how could I, as his wife, not die a virtuous woman?"

Upon entering the fortress, Japanese soldiers demanded Kim's surrender. In an attempt to compel compliance, they inflicted pain by stabbing his fingers. Nevertheless, Kim refused to yield. Both he and his wife were subsequently executed.

== Legacy ==
Following Kim Yŏn'gwang's death, Sŏng Hon petitioned for a posthumous appointment to recognize him alongside Song Sanghyŏn, Magistrate of Tongnae, and Yu Kŭngnyang (유극량; 校書館), Auxiliary Defense Commander (조방장; 助防將), who had fallen in Siege of Tongnae and Battle of Imjin River, respectively. Chief State Councillor Yu Sŏngnyong also submitted a detailed memorial to the king, reporting on Kim Yŏn'gwang and other officials who had died during the early stages of the war. In response, the royal court posthumously appointed Kim Yŏn'gwang to the positions of Vice Minister (참판; 參判) of the Ministry of Rites and associate director (동지사; 同知事) of the Ŭigŭmbu.

In 1666, Confucian scholars in Kaesong established Sungjŏlsa Temple (숭절서원; 崇節書院) to commemorate Song Sanghyŏn, Kim Yŏn'gwang, and Yu Kŭngnyang. In 1694, the shrine was granted royal charter and was officially designated as Seowon, a state-recognized Confucian academy.
