= No Kaebang =

Korean scholar-official (1563–1592)

- 노개방
- Born: 1563; Miryang, Joseon
- Died: 15th day, 4th month of 1592 (aged 28–29); Dongnae, Joseon
- Cause of death: Killed in action
- Military career
- Allegiance: Joseon
- Conflicts: Imjin War; Siege of Dongnae †

Korean name
- Hangul: 노개방
- Hanja: 盧蓋邦
- RR: No Gaebang
- MR: No Kaebang

Courtesy name
- Hangul: 유한
- Hanja: 維翰
- RR: Yuhan
- MR: Yuhan

No Kaebang (Korean: 노개방; Hanja: 盧蓋邦; 1563 – 15th day, 4th month of 1592) was a Korean scholar-official of the mid-Joseon period. He is remembered for his death in the siege of Dongnae in the early stages of the Imjin War. At the time, he was serving as First-tier instructor of Dongnae.

Born in Miryang, No was noted from a young age for his intellectual aptitude and devotion to classical learning. Though initially disinclined toward officialdom, he acceded to his parents' wishes and passed the civil service examination in 1588. Following his success in the examination, he was appointed to minor posts such as Probationary Staff and Third Proctor, before being assigned as First-tier Instructor in Dongnae, where he oversaw instruction in Confucian learning at the local hyanggyo.

In the 4th month of 1592, while on leave in Miryang, the Imjin War broke out. Upon hearing of the Japanese invasion, No Kaebang returned to Dongnae to protect the spirit tablets of the ancient sages. He entered the fortress and remained at the pavilion Chŏngwŏllu, where the tablets had been relocated. When the Japanese forces breached the walls and overran the fortress, No Kaebang was killed defending the tablets to the end.

Posthumously, he was granted the honorary title of Chief Royal Secretary and enshrined at Chunghyosa in Miryang. He was also commemorated at an auxiliary shrine of Chungnyeolsa, and in 1735, he was formally incorporated into the main shrine alongside Song Sanghyŏn and Chŏng Pal. In 1742, he and his wife were both enshrined at the Songgongdan altar constructed at Chŏngwŏllu. A stele honoring his martyrdom was also erected at the site.

== Early life and career ==
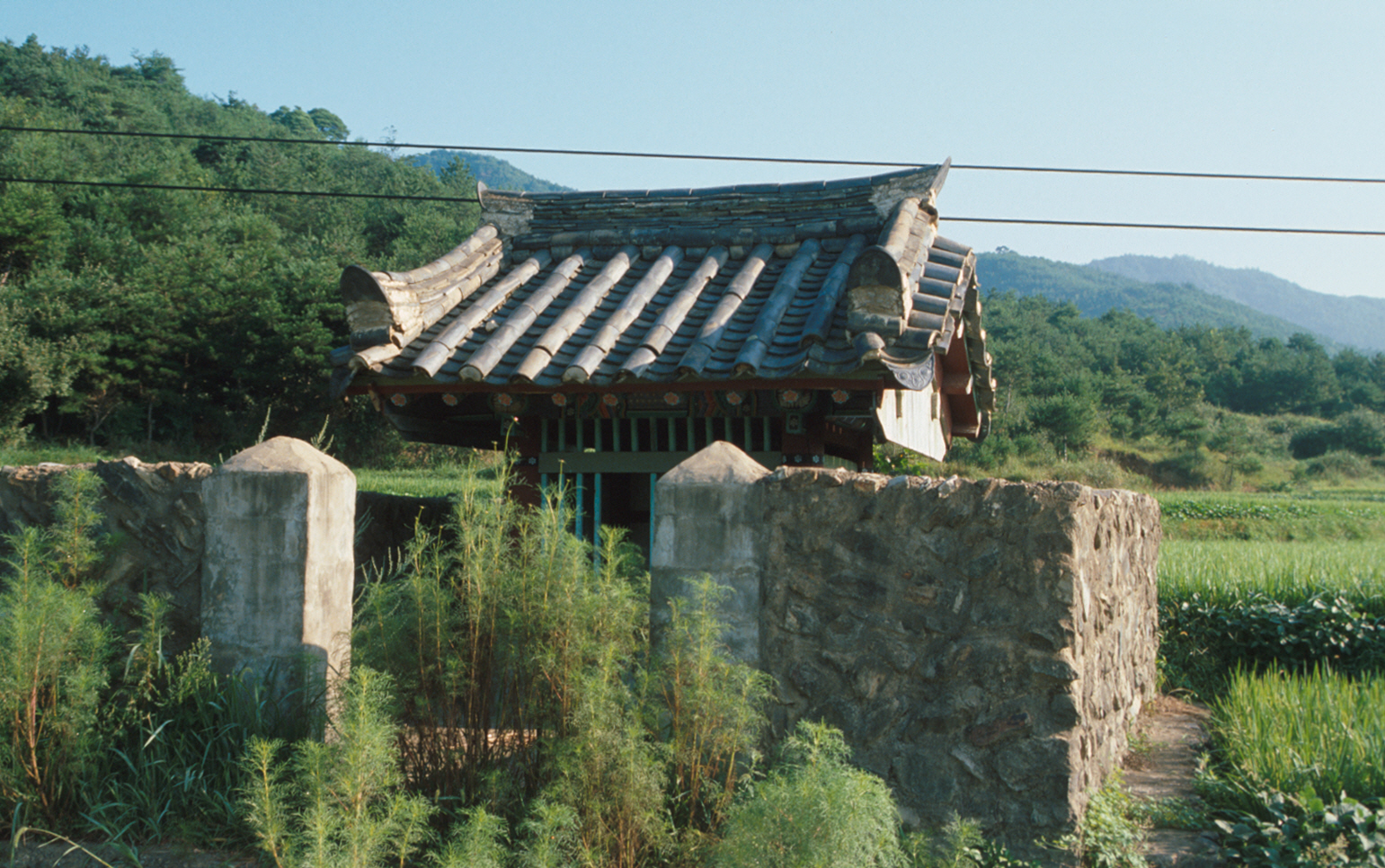
Monument House (정려각; 旌閭閣) of No Kaebang, photographed in 1985

=== Birth and education ===
No Kaebang was born in 1563 in Garye-ri (가례리; 佳禮里), Miryang, in Gyeongsang Province. His father, No Il (노일; 盧馹), was a degreeless scholar (유학; 幼學), and his mother, a member of the Yeoju Yi clan, was the daughter of Yi Kyŏngok (이경옥; 李慶沃). Despite growing up under modest circumstances, he was reportedly endowed with innate intelligence and literary aptitude. Known for his intense dedication to study, he was said to have carried classical texts and poetry with him at all times By the age of ten, he was already regarded as highly erudite and accomplished in literary composition.

No Kaebang authored several works—including Paekiryangbu and Nuch'ŏnyŏŏn (백일양부 누천여언; 白一兩賦 累千餘言)—which earned him recognition for literary distinction. Although he initially showed no desire for government service and refrained from taking the civil examinations, he eventually acquiesced to persistent encouragement from his parents. In 1588, he sat for the triennial regular civil service examination and passed in 24th place in the third tier.

=== Early career ===
After passing the civil service examination, No Kaebang received his initial appointment as a probationary official (권지; 權知), and later as third proctor (학유; 學諭) at the Royal Confucian Academy. Due to both the advanced age of his parents and the economic hardships facing his family, he petitioned to be assigned closer to his hometown and was subsequently appointed as first-tier instructor (교수; 敎授) of Dongnae, a post geographically near Miryang. There, he diligently fulfilled his responsibilities at the Dongnae Hyanggyo, where he instructed local students in Confucian classics and proper ritual conduct.

== Imjin War ==
=== Battle of Dongnae ===
In the spring of 1592, No Kaebang took a brief leave of absence to visit his parents in Miryang. During this period, the Imjin War broke out. On the 14th day of the 4th month, the Japanese First Division under Konishi Yukinaga launched an assault on Busan, initiating full-scale hostilities. Following the fall of Busan, the Japanese forces advanced toward Dongnae.

Upon learning that Dongnae Fortress had been encircled by Japanese forces, No Kaebang promptly returned from Miryang to the Dongnae Hyanggyo. Declaring, "Even in death, I cannot abandon the spirit tablets of the sages to the ravages of war," he made haste to the local Confucian academy. At that time, the Dongnae Hyanggyo was located outside the fortress walls and was therefore exposed to military threat. However, by the time of No's arrived, the Confucian student Mun Tŏkkyŏm (문덕겸; 文德謙) and several others had already relocated the spirit tablets of Confucius and other former sages to Chŏngwŏllu (정원루; 靖遠樓), the guesthouse within the fortress. As the Temple of Confucius had thus been vacated, No Kaebang entered the fortress as well.

After arriving at Chŏngwŏllu within Dongnae Fortress, No Kaebang paid formal respects to the spirit tablets of the sages and remained there to guard them without departing. In the meantime, the Japanese forces encircling the fortress dispatched envoys to demand surrender. However, the magistrate of Dongnae, Song Sanghyŏn firmly rejected the proposal, prompting the onset of battle. The Japanese launched a coordinated assault from the east, west, and south, eventually breaching the northeastern wall and capturing the fortress.

=== Death ===
Despite the fall of the fortress, No Kaebang refused to capitulate and resisted until the end. He was killed in action alongside his Confucian students Mun Tŏkkyŏm and Yang Chohan (양조한; 梁潮漢). His wife, Lady Yi of the Yeoju Yi clan, who had remained in Miryang, encountered Japanese troops while fleeing into the mountains. Clutching her husband's red certificate of civil examination, she leapt from a cliff to preserve her honor.

== Legacy ==
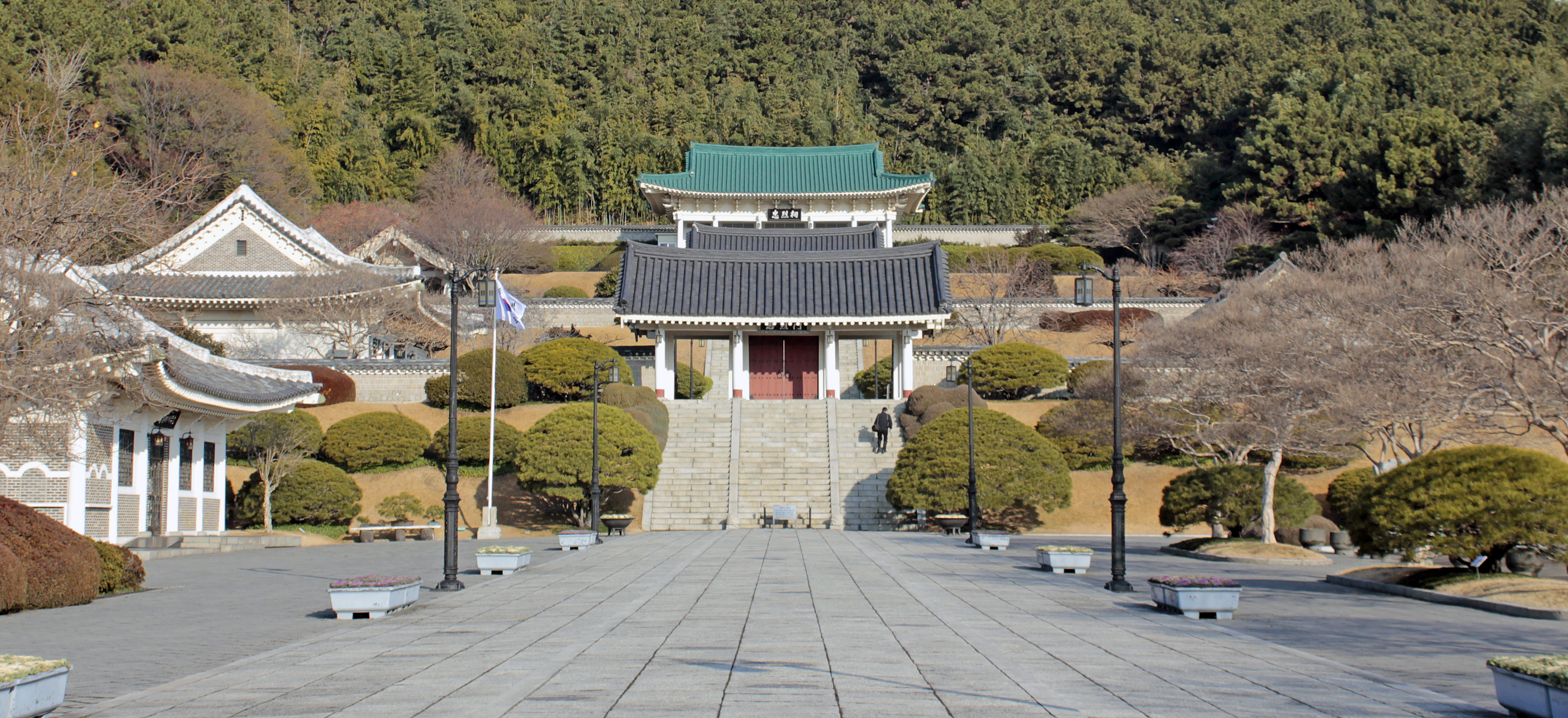
Chungnyeolsa in Busan

After his death, No Kaebang was posthumously appointed to the position of chief royal secretary (도승지; 都承旨) by the royal court and was enshrined at Chunghyosa (충효사; 忠孝祠) in his native Miryang.

In 1709, Kwŏn Ijin, then magistrate of Dongnae, established an auxiliary shrine at the former site of Chungnyeolsa to commemorate both No Kaebang and Cho Yŏnggyu, who had perished during the Siege of Dongnae. The following year, he submitted a request to the court for the shrine to receive official status, which was granted. In 1735, upon the recommendation of Min Ŭngsu, the shrine was incorporated into the main Chungnyeolsa, where No Kaebang was formally enshrined alongside Song Sanghyŏn and Chŏng Pal. In 1742, during the tenure of Magistrate Kim Sŏgil (김석일; 金錫一), a commemorative altar named Songgongdan was constructed at Chŏngwŏllu. At this site, No Kaebang was honored at the northern altar, while his wife, Lady Yi of the Yeoju Yi clan, was enshrined at the western altar. In 1795, a memorial stele was erected within Songgongdan to commemorate No Kaebang's fidelity and death in service.
