= Song Sanghyŏn =

Korean scholar-official (1551–1592)

Duke Ch'ungnyŏl Song Sanghyŏn
- 송상현
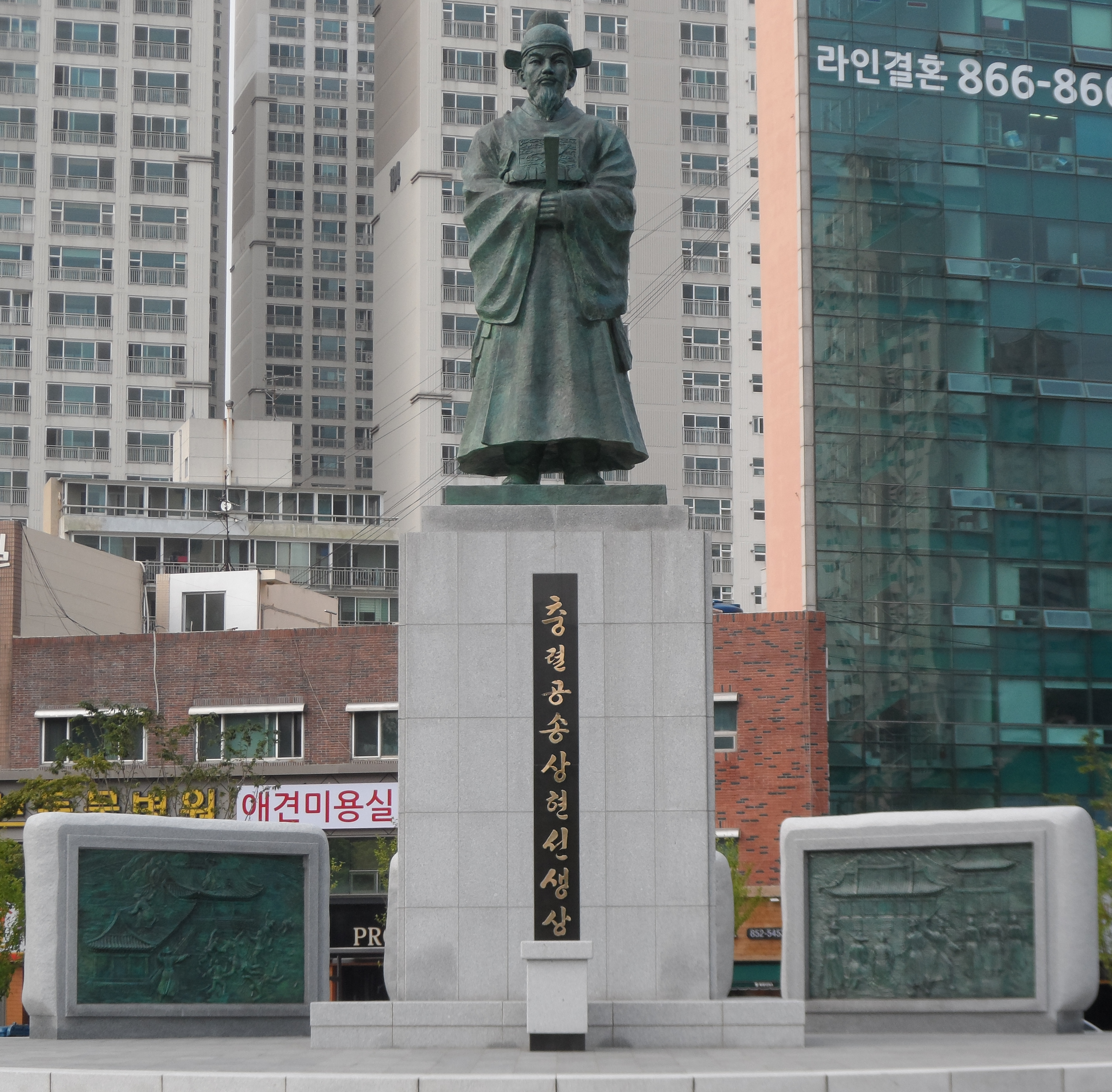
- Statue of Song in Busan, South Korea
- Born: 8th day, 1st month of 1551; Kobu, Joseon
- Died: 15th day, 4th month of 1592; Dongnaeeupseong, Joseon
- Burial place: Cheongju, South Korea
- Citizenship: Joseon
- Occupation: Literati official
- Years active: 1576-1592
- Known for: Imjin War; Siege of Dongnae †

Korean name
- Hangul: 송상현
- Hanja: 宋象賢
- RR: Song Sanghyeon
- MR: Song Sanghyŏn

Art name
- Hangul: 천곡
- Hanja: 泉谷
- RR: Cheongok
- MR: Ch'ŏn'gok

Courtesy name
- Hangul: 덕구
- Hanja: 德求
- RR: Deokgu
- MR: Tŏkku

Posthumous name
- Hangul: 충렬
- Hanja: 忠烈
- RR: Chungryeol
- MR: Ch'ungnyŏl

Song Sanghyŏn (Korean: 송상현; Hanja: 宋象賢; 8th day, 1st month of 1551 – 15th day, 4th month of 1592) was a Korean scholar-official and military leader of the mid-Joseon period. He is remembered for his death in battle during the Imjin War while serving as Magistrate of Dongnae.

Born in 1551 in Kobu, Song ranked first in the preliminary civil service examination in 1565. In 1576, He passed the state civil service examination and entered government service. Over the course of his career, Song held a range of posts in both central and provincial administrations. He also served as a diplomat in two missions dispatched to Ming China. However, his political trajectory was interrupted by conflict with the official Yi Pal, which led to his demotion.

He was later reinstated to central government posts, and appointed Magistrate of Dongnae in 1591. Following the outbreak of the Imjin War in 1592, Song assumed command of the fortress Dongnaeeupseong. When asked by the Japanese to surrender, he refused and chose to resist until the end. The defenders were vastly outnumbered, the fortress fell, and Song was killed in battle. In 1595, his remains were recovered and reburied in Cheongju.

In 1594, Kim Ŭngsŏ relayed details of Song's death to the royal court. Subsequently, Song was subsequently posthumously promoted to Minister of Personnel. He was also granted the posthumous honorific title Ch'ungnyŏl and further elevated to Left Chancellor. Song is commemorated in several locations, including the shrine Chungnyeolsa in Busan and Sinhang Seowon in Cheongju.

== Early life ==
=== Birth and education ===
Song Sanghyŏn was born on the 8th day of the 1st month in 1551 in Kobu, Jeolla Province, Joseon. His paternal lineage was the Yeosan Song clan. He was the son of Song Pokhŭng (송복흥; 宋復興) and a lady of the Andong Kim clan. His father held various local and central government positions, including Magistrate of Yangji and Pyonggang and Inspector (감찰; 監察) at the Office of the Inspector-General.

Song started studying at the age of seven and was said to have mastered the Confucian classics and histories during his teens. According to the Veritable Records of the Joseon Dynasty, he was also well-versed in poetry and prose. In 1565, he placed first in the Preliminary Civil Service Examination (승보시; 陞補試) with a poem titled "Resolutely Abstaining from Alcohol" (절구불음주; 絶口不飮酒), in which he expressed his loyalty by citing the historical figure Yue Fei as an exemplar of loyalty and integrity. (Note: An anecdote recounts that Chinese general Yue Fei, though fond of alcohol, resolved to abstain from drinking when the Song dynasty was under threat, vowing to raise a cup only after defeating the Jin and offering a toast to the emperor's long life.) In 1570, he passed the Literary Licentiate Examination (진사시; 進士試).

=== Civil service examination ===
While preparing for the state examinations, Song Sanghyŏn personally compiled an anthology titled Ch'ŏn'gok sup'il (천곡수필; 泉谷手筆). This collection features seventeen selected topics from civil service examinations administered between 1552 and 1568, along with Song's handwritten copies of examinees' responses. As a handwritten manuscript by Song, the work offers valuable insight into both the Neo-Confucian intellectual climate of the era and Song's scholarly outlook.

Song addressed topics of statecraft—such as national defense, diplomacy, and governance—as well as philosophical questions rooted in Neo-Confucianism, including spiritual beings, Way of Heaven, and the innate nature of birds and beasts. Historian Park Jong-chun argued that this integration of philosophical and practical subjects distinguishes the work from other collections of examination compilations of the period. Moreover, Song did not limit his selection to essays by top-ranked candidates, but included a broad range of responses from successful examinees. Song placed 11th in the third-tier honors of the irregular civil service examination (별시문과; 別試文科) in 1576.

== Career before the Imjin War ==
Song's careers before Imjin War
Year	Office	Post	Rank
Seonjo Period
1577	Sŭngmunwŏn	Proofreader	9A
1578	Sŭngmunwŏn	First Copyist	8A
1579	Sŭngmunwŏn	Erudite	7A
1579	Sŭngjŏngwŏn	Recorder	7A
1580	Kyongsong	Assistant Magistrate	5B
1583	Sahŏnbu	Fourth Inspector	5A
1583	Yejo	Section Chief	5A
1583	Hojo	Section Chief	5A
1583	Kongjo	Section Chief	5A
1586	Ŭn'gyedo	Circuit Inspector	6B
1586	Hamgyong	Assistant Commander	6A
1587	Sahŏnbu	Fourth Inspector	5A
1588	Paechon	Magistrate	4B
1590	Ch'unghunbu	Secretary	4B
1590	Sahŏnbu	Second Inspector	3B
1590	Saganwŏn	Censor	3B
1590	Sajaegam	Chief Director	3A
1590	Kunjagam	Chief Director	3A
1591	Dongnae	Magistrate	3A

=== Early career ===
In 1577, Song Sanghyŏn entered government service as a Proofreader (정자; 正字) at the Office of Diplomatic Correspondence (승문원; 承文院). He was promoted in 1578 to First Copyist (저작; 著作), and in the following year advanced to the post of Erudite (박사; 博士). Shortly thereafter, he was recommended for appointment as Recorder (주서; 注書) of the Royal Secretariat, along concurrently serving as an Associate Compiler (기사관; 記事官) at the Office of State Records.

In the 1st month of 1581, Song was assigned to a provincial post as Assistant Magistrate (판관; 判官) of Kyongsong. Over the course of his three-year tenure, he sought to stabilize local governance through moral instruction and the promotion of Confucian education. In 1583, he was appointed Fourth Inspector (지평; 持平) at the Office of the Inspector-General, and subsequently held the position of Section Chief (정랑; 正郞) in the Ministries of Rites, Taxation, and Public Works.

=== Envoy to Ming China ===
In 1584, Song was appointed as Verification Officer (질정관; 質正官) on a diplomatic mission to Ming China tasked with resolving the long-standing controversy over the royal genealogy of the Joseon dynasty: the Chonggye Pyŏnmu. The objective of the mission was to correct the distorted claim in the Collected Statutes of the Ming Dynasty, which asserted that King Taejo, the founder of the Joseon dynasty, was descended from Yi Inim, a late Goryeo aristocrat that was denounced as a traitor.

Song departed on the 3rd day of the 5th month in 1584, alongside Chief Envoy (주청사; 奏請使) Hwang Chŏnguk and Vice Envoy (서장관; 書狀官) Han Ŭngin. As Verification Officer, Song was responsible for analyzing Chinese scholarly trends and politics. He played a central role in verifying the philological accuracy of classical texts and diplomatic documents, meticulously examining the usage of Chinese characters and vocabulary. He was reappointed to the same post the following year and undertook a second diplomatic mission to Ming.

=== Demotion and reinstatement ===
Upon returning to Joseon, Song resumed his post as Fourth Inspector in the Office of the Inspector-General. However, due to a conflict with Yi Pal, he was soon demoted in 1586 to Circuit Inspector (찰방; 察訪) of post stations on the Ŭn'gye Route (은계도; 銀溪道). Later that same year, he was reassigned as Assistant Military Commander (평사; 評事) of North Hamgyong, where he served under Provincial Military Commander Yi Il. During this tenure, Song acquired firsthand knowledge of the Chesŭng Pangnyak, a strategic military defense system designed for regional security.

In 1588, he was reinstated as Fourth Inspector and appointed Magistrate of Paechon in 1588. After stepping down in 1590, Song held a series of central government posts, including Secretary (경력; 經歷) at the Office of Loyalty and Rewards, Second Inspector (집의; 執義) at the Office of the Inspector-General, Censor (사간; 司諫) at the Office of the Censor-General, and Chief Director (정; 正) at the Directorate of Palace Kitchen Supplies and the Directorate of Military Procurement.

== Imjin War ==
=== Appointment as magistrate of Dongnae ===
In 1591, Song Sanghyŏn was elevated to the senior third rank of Grand Master for Comprehensive Governance (통정대부; 通政大夫) and appointed as Magistrate of Dongnae on the 4th day of the 4th month that same year. Given Dongnae's strategic status as the first line of defense against a potential Japanese incursion, Song—recognized not only for his scholarly accomplishments but also for his prior service as Assistant Military Commander in Hamgyong—was appointed as a civil official who embodied both literary distinction and military aptitude.

Later Confucian scholar Song Siyŏl, in his biographical account of Song Sanghyŏn, instead argued that the appointment—despite its being the foremost military outpost exposed to potential Japanese aggression—was in fact an act of political relegation, orchestrated by the Easterners political faction as a means of marginalizing him from central court affairs.

Upon assuming office in Dongnae, Song Sanghyŏn initiated extensive defensive preparations in anticipation of Japanese aggression. He supervised the repair of fortress walls, ordered the planting of trees along the outer perimeter to serve as natural palisades, and directed the excavation of trenches to reinforce the fortifications. He also implemented a regimen of military drills for the local garrison, thereby improving the town's practical readiness for armed conflict. Song composed a poem and sent it to Kim Changsaeng, then serving as magistrate of Chŏngsan, expressing his intent to resist the Japanese invasion to the end.

=== Siege of Dongnae ===
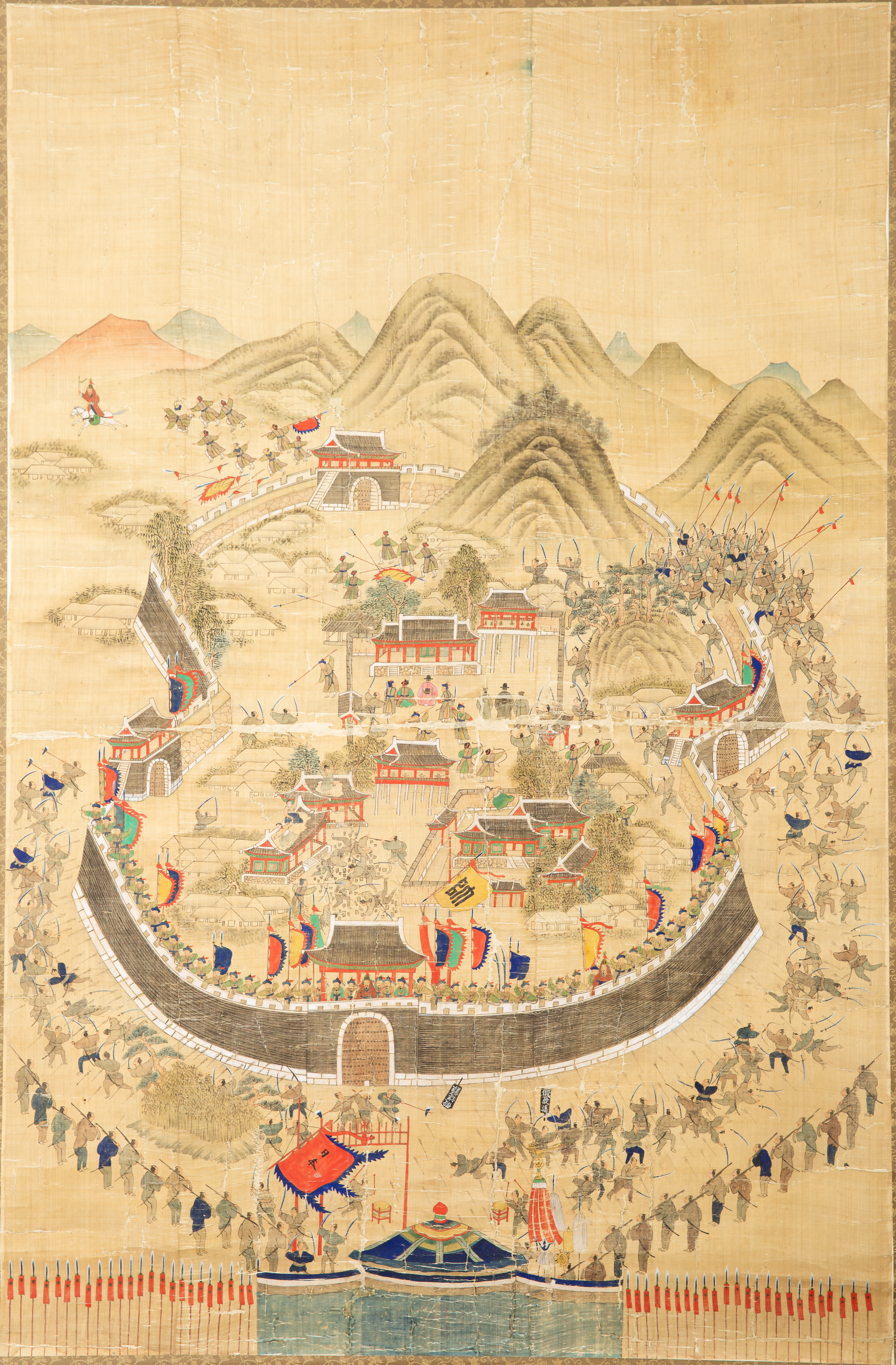
The painting Tongnaebu sunjŏlto depicts a battle against Japanese forces in Dongnae.

On the 14th day, 4th month of 1592, the First Division of the Japanese forces, under the command of Konishi Yukinaga, landed at Busan. The Joseon garrison at Busanjin under Chŏng Pal and the soldiers at Tadaepo under Yun Hŭngsin engaged the invaders. Both Korean groups were defeated after intense fighting. Following these initial victories, the Japanese army advanced toward the Dongnae region.

On the morning of the 15th day, 4th month, as news of the Japanese advance spread, several officials arrived in Dongnae with reinforcements: Yi Kak, the Provincial Military Commander of the Left Division of Gyeongsang Province; Cho Yŏnggyu, the Magistrate of Yangsan; and Yi Ŏnsŏng (이언성; 李彦誠), the Magistrate of Ulsan.

Upon their arrival, Song Sanghyŏn urged Yi Kak to remain within Dongnaeeupseong and to lead a coordinated defense. Yi Kak, however, adhered to the operational doctrines of the Chesŭng Pangnyak system, which prescribed that Provincial Military Commanders were to engage enemy forces outside fortress walls in maneuver warfare, rather than being confined to static defense. In accordance with these principles, Yi Kak declined Song's entreaty, withdrew from the fortress, and went to the strategic rear zone of Sosan (소산; 蘇山) to establish his encampment. He left Song and the remaining defenders behind to face the impending Japanese assault on their own.

On the same day, the Japanese army dispatched an advance unit that demanded Song surrender, erecting a wooden placard that read, "If you want to fight, then fight. If not, then let us pass" (戰則戰矣 不戰則假道). Song defiantly hurled a reply placard over the wall, inscribed with the words: "It is easy for me to die, but difficult to let you pass" (戰死易 假道難).

In response to the rejection, the Japanese mobilized approximately 20,000 troops that were organized into three columns. They encircled the fortress from the east, west, and south, and commenced a coordinated siege assault. Song Sanghyŏn took position atop the southern gate pavilion to personally direct the defense and oversee the battle. The ensuing engagement was both fierce and protracted. Eventually, the Japanese forces breached the northeastern section of the mountain-side wall. Overwhelmed by the enemy's numerical superiority and aggressive tactics, the defenders of Dongnae were defeated, and the fortress fell.

=== Death ===
孤城月暈 列鎭高枕
君臣義重 父子恩輕

A lonely fortress haloed by the moon,
While other garrisons sleep in deep slumber.
The duty between lord and subject weighs heavy—
Heavier even than the grace of one's parents.

— Song Sanghyŏn, 1592

In the face of an increasingly desperate military situation, Song Sanghyŏn donned his official court robes and seated himself in a dignified manner on a folding stool. Amidst the turmoil, a Japanese officer—previously acquainted with Song—offered to help him escape the battlefield. Song declined the offer.

In his final moments, he composed a farewell poem of 16 characters addressed to his father on a folding fan. Song was killed by Japanese forces on the 15th day of the 4th month in 1592, at the age of 42.

== Legacy ==
=== Burial ===
Immediately following the Battle of Dongnae, Konishi Yukinaga ordered that Song Sanghyŏn's body be buried outside the fortress's east gate. A wooden stake was erected by the Japanese to mark the location of the burial site.

In 1595, Song's widow Lady Yi of the Seongju Yi clan, through their eldest son Song In'gŭp (송인급; 宋仁及), requested that her husband's remains be reinterred in Cheongju. In response, King Seonjo dispatched Tu Sach'ung (두사충; 杜師忠) to supervise the exhumation and the subsequent relocation of the remains to Kapogok (가포곡; 加布谷), Cheongju.

At the time, Min Inbaek—a longtime friend of Song Sanghyŏn and then Magistrate of Cheongju—assumed responsibility for the burial arrangements. He procured a coffin, organized the labor force for the funerary rites, and oversaw the proceedings. The gate Ch'ungsinmun (충신문; 忠臣門) was erected in Song's honor, and King Seonjo further commemorated him with a royal memorial inscription composed by Ch'a Ullo (차운로; 車雲路). In 1662, after Song Sanghyŏn was officially granted a posthumous name, his gravesite received a memorial stone with an inscription composed in 1658 by Song Siyŏl.

=== Posthumous titles ===
The news of Song Sanghyŏn's death was neither promptly nor accurately relayed to the royal court. According to a statement by Kim Su, the Governor of Gyeongsang Province, there were conflicting accounts of his fate: one claim had it that he had survived, while another said he had defected to Japan. Kim claimed that Song had died in battle and that his severed head had been sent to Tsushima—an assertion later proven to be false.

It was not until 1593, through an official communication from the Border Defense Council, that the accurate account of Song's death was formally acknowledged by the court. The following year, Kim Ŭngsŏ obtained further details regarding Song's fate during negotiations with a high-ranking Japanese commander—possibly Konishi Yukinaga or Katō Kiyomasa—and reported his findings to the Joseon government.

As a result, Chŏng Kyŏngse and O Ŏngnyŏng submitted memorials requesting that the court confer honors upon Song Sanghyŏn. In 1595, he was posthumously elevated to the position of Minister of Personnel. In 1681, following a memorial submitted by Left State Councilor Min Chŏngjung, Song was further posthumously promoted to the office of Left Associate State Councilor (좌찬성; 左贊成).

Discussions regarding Song Sanghyŏn's posthumous honorific title began in 1653 and various titles such as Ch'ungnyŏl (충렬; 忠烈), Ch'unghyŏn (충현; 忠顯), and Ŭiryŏl (의렬; 義烈) were considered. Later, in the 11th month of 1657, the title Ch'ungnyŏl, meaning "Loyal and Courageous", was conferred in light of Song Sanghyŏn's deeds based on a eulogy authored by Song Siyŏl.

=== Memorial ===
==== Chungnyeolsa ====
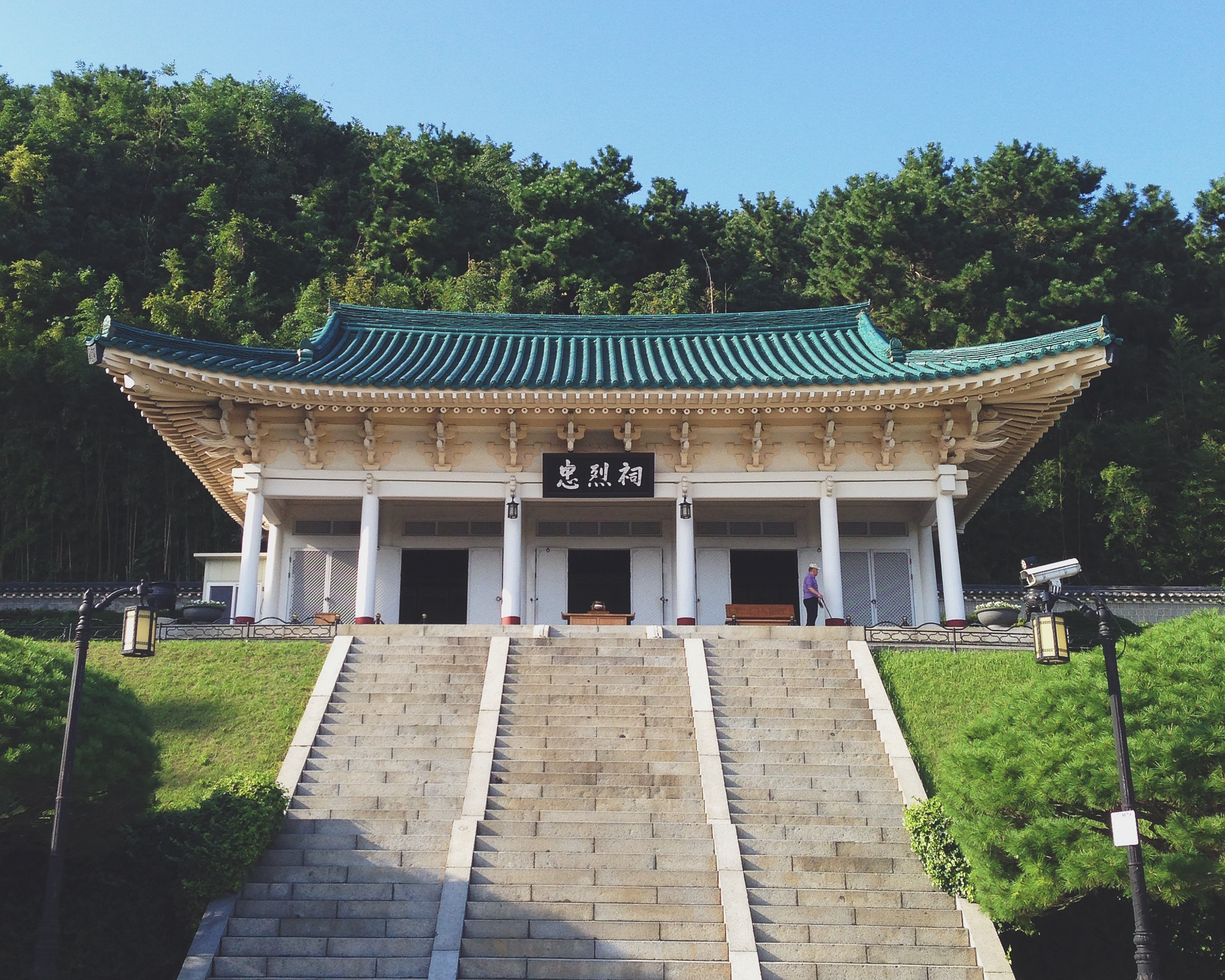
Chungnyeolsa in Busan

In 1605, Yun Hwŏn, Magistrate of Dongnae, established a shrine named Songgongsa (송공사; 宋公祠) within the south gate of Dongnaeeupseong to commemorate Song Sanghyŏn. Later, in 1624, the shrine was officially recognized and granted a royal plaque of Chungnyeolsa, and Chŏng Pal was subsequently enshrined there alongside Song. In the 8th month of 1652, Yun Mun'gŏ, Magistrate of Dongnae, relocated Chungnyeolsa to Allak-ri, expanded its facilities, and reorganized it as a seowon (traditional academy).

In 1709, Kwŏn Ijin, also Magistrate of Dongnae, established an auxiliary shrine on the former site of Chungnyeolsa and enshrined figures of the Siege of Dongnae such as Cho Yŏnggyu and No Kaebang. The following year, the shrine also received a royal plaque. In 1735, it was formally merged into Chungnyeolsa following a memorial submitted by Min Ŭngsu. In 1742, Kim Sŏgil (김석일; 金錫一), then Magistrate of Dongnae, erected a commemorative altar named Songgongdan on the grounds of Chŏngwŏllu (정원루; 靖遠樓), the site where Song Sanghyŏn had fallen in battle, as a further tribute to his legacy.

==== Sinhang Seowon and others ====
Yujŏng Seowon (유정서원; 有定書院) was founded in 1570 by local Sarim scholars in Cheongju. In its early years, it enshrined figures such as Pak Hun (박훈; 朴薰) and Song Insu. In 1650, Song Sanghyŏn and Yi Tŭgyun were also enshrined, largely through the efforts and patronage of Song Siyŏl. From 1654 onward, Song Siyŏl actively championed the bestowal of a royal plaque for the academy. In support of this initiative, Yi Inbo (이인보; 李寅寶) and other scholar-officials from Cheongju submitted a formal memorial in 1657 requesting royal recognition. As a result, Yujŏng Seowon was officially granted a royal plaque in 1660 and renamed Sinhang Seowon.

In addition to Sinhang Seowon, Song Sanghyŏn was also enshrined at Chŏngch'ungsa (정충사; 旌忠祠) in his hometown of Kobu, alongside Sin Ho and Kim Chun. He was further commemorated at Sungjŏl Seowon (숭절서원; 崇節書院) in Kaesong, where he was honored together with Kim Yŏn'gwang and Yu Kŭngnyang (유극량; 校書館). He was likewise enshrined at Chungnyeolsa in Cheongju and Hwagok Seowon (화곡서원; 華谷書院) in Kyongsong.
