= Yi Kak =

Korean military leader (?–1592)

- Born: Unknown
- Died: 14th day, 5th month of 1592; Imjin River, Joseon
- Cause of death: Execution
- Military career
- Allegiance: Joseon
- Conflicts: Imjin War; Siege of Dongnae; Battle of Sosan; Battle of Ulsan

Korean name
- Hangul: 이각
- Hanja: 李珏
- RR: I Gak
- MR: I Kak

Yi Kak (Korean: 이각; Hanja: 李珏; died on 14th day, 5th month of 1592) was a Korean military leader of the mid-Joseon period.

Yi was serving as the Provincial Military Commander of Left Gyeongsang at the outbreak of the Imjin War. When Japanese forces landed at Busan in the 4th month of 1592, he immediately advanced to Dongnae Fortress. Intending to provide external support rather than engage in a siege defense, he withdrew from the fortress and established a forward position at Sosan.

Following the fall of Dongnae, he joined forces with Pak Chin, Magistrate of Miryang, and formed a defensive line at Sosan, but as the battle turned against them, Yi retreated to Eonyang. From there, he moved to Ulsan, where the Military Headquarters of the Left Gyeongsang Army was located, to prepare for further defense.

He ordered the thirteen county contingents to remain within the fortress, while he positioned his main force outside at Seosan to form an external line of resistance. However, on the 22nd day of the 4th month, the command fortress came under Japanese assault and collapsed, prompting Yi to retreat once more. Yi then attempted to travel north but, upon reaching General Kim Myŏngwŏn's camp near the Imjin River, was arrested and executed.

== Imjin War ==
Yi Kak was serving as Provincial Military Commander (병마절도사; 兵馬節度使) of Left Gyeongsang (경상좌도; 慶尙左道) at the outbreak of the Imjin War in 1592.

=== Battle of Dongnae ===
On the 13th day of the 4th month in 1592, Japanese forces landed at Busan and launched an assault on Busanjin the following day. In response, troops of the Left Gyeongsang Army were mobilized to Dongnae, and Yi Kak proceeded there to oversee the initial defense. He entered Dongnae Fortress on the morning of the 15th day of the 4th month and ordered Cho Yŏnggyu, Magistrate of Yangsan, to lead a cavalry detachment on a reconnaissance mission. Upon receiving Cho's report regarding the enemy's size and disposition, Yi withdrew from the fortress and established a forward position at Sosan Post Station (소산역; 蘇山驛), intending to block the Japanese advance through the surrounding terrain and provide external support to the fortress.

Although Song Sanghyŏn, Magistrate of Dongnae, proposed a joint defense from within the fortress, Yi adhered strictly to the Chesŭng Pangnyak strategy, which prescribed that regional military commanders operate field armies outside fortified positions rather than engage directly in siege defense. Accordingly, he declined to participate in the fortress defense and positioned his forces on the outer perimeter. Alongside Pak Hong, Provincial Naval Commander (수군절도사; 水軍節度使) of Left Gyeongsang, Yi attempted to approach the rear of Dongnae Fortress but was repulsed by Japanese forces and forced to retreat to Sosan. On the same day, Dongnae Fortress fell to the Japanese forces.

=== Battle of Sosan ===
Yi Kak stationed his troops at Sosan Post Station, where he was joined by Pak Chin, Magistrate of Miryang, who had advanced toward the area intending to relieve the stronghold. Following the fall of Dongnae Fortress, the two commanders agreed to establish a joint defensive line at Sosan: Pak Chin was to construct a forward entrenchment, while Yi Kak would provide rear support.

On the evening of the 15th day of the 4th month, the Japanese vanguard, having secured Dongnae, advanced on Sosan. The ensuing battle ended unfavorably for the Joseon forces, prompting Yi Kak to withdraw to Eonyang. There he regrouped with Provincial Naval Commander Pak Hong and other subordinate units. Considering a further relocation to Military Headquarter of Left Gyeongsang at Ulsan, Yi was opposed by Pak Ŭijang, Executive Assistant to Magistrate (판관; 判官) of Gyeongju, who argued for continued resistance at Eonyang. Yet, with the advance of the Japanese Second Division under Katō Kiyomasa into Eonyang, Yi fell back further to Ulsan and directed Pak to return to Gyeongju Fortress to organize its defense along the left route of Gyeongsang Province.

=== Battle of Ulsan ===
Following his retreat to the Military Headquarter of Left Gyeongsang, Yi Kak arranged for the evacuation of his concubine, along with bolts of cotton cloth stored in the army's supply depot. Concurrently, he proposed that the thirteen county contingents, assembled under wartime mobilization directives, remain within the fortress to mount a defensive stand, while he himself would command an auxiliary force stationed outside the fortress at Seosan.

Yi further requested that the elite Sŏkchŏn unit (석전군; 石戰軍) from Andong be placed under his direct command. On the 21st day of the 4th month, he established his encampment at Seosan. The following day, on the 22nd, Japanese forces launched an assault on the Left Army Command Headquarters. ThThe fortress descended into disarray and ultimately collapsed amid internal disorder. Yi Kak subsequently retreated once more, this time toward Hwahyŏnnae (화현내; 花縣內) near Daegu.

=== Death ===
Yi Kak attempted to travel northward in order to seek an audience with the king. However, upon arriving at the encampment of General Kim Myŏngwŏn stationed near the Imjin River, he was arrested and summarily executed on the 14th day, 5th month of 1592. Kim charged Yi with abandoning his position and fleeing the battlefield, holding him accountable for the fall of multiple defensive strongholds during the early phase of the invasion.
