= Chungnyeolsa =

Chungnyeolsa can refer to various Korean shrines, including:

- Chungnyeolsa (Chungju), a shrine to Im Gyeong Eop in Chungju
- Chungnyeolsa (Goseong), a shrine to Yi Sun-sin in Goseong
- Chungnyeolsa (Busan), a shrine to Song Sang-hyeon in Busan
