= Yun Hŭngsin =

Korean general (1540–1592)

- 윤흥신
- Born: 1540
- Died: 15th day, 4th month of 1592; Dadaepo, Joseon
- Cause of death: Killed in action
- Military career
- Allegiance: Joseon
- Conflicts: Imjin War; Battle of Dadaejin †

Korean name
- Hangul: 윤흥신
- Hanja: 尹興信
- RR: Yun Heungsin
- MR: Yun Hŭngsin

Yun Hŭngsin (Korean: 윤흥신; Hanja: 尹興信; 1553–15th day, 4th month of 1592) was a Korean military leader of the mid-Joseon period. He is remembered for his death in battle the early stages of the Imjin War while serving as Garrison Commander of Dadaepo.

Born in 1540, Yun was the son of Yun Im, a central figure in the Taeyun faction. Following the Fourth literati purge of 1545, Yun Im and three of Yun Hŭngsin's older brothers were executed, and the young Yun was reduced to the status of a slave. His legal and social standing remained suppressed until 1577, when King Seonjo reinstated Yun Im's posthumous honors, resulting in Yun Hŭngsin's emancipation and the restoration of his family's assets.

In 1592, Yun Hŭngsin was appointed Garrison Commander of Dadaepo. After Japanese forces under Konishi Yukinaga captured Busan and advanced, Yun successfully repelled their initial assault on the 14th day of the 4th month. On the following day, however, a reinforced Japanese attack overwhelmed the garrison and Yun, alongside his younger brother Yun Hŭngje, was killed in action.

Yun was posthumously promoted to Vice Minister of War during King Sukjong's reign and was later recommended for further honors, including promotion to Minister of War and the bestowal of a posthumous title. Cho Ŏm initiated efforts to memorialize him, which led to Yun's enshrinement at Chungnyeolsa. Yi Haemun established a commemorative altar within Dadaepo Fortress and instituted annual memorial rites. Although Yi's plans to erect a stele were delayed, the project was completed in 1841 by Cho Inyŏng, the grandson of Cho Ŏm.

== Early life and career ==
=== Birth and family ===
Yun Hŭngsin born in 1540 as the fifth son of Yun Im. As the elder brother of Queen Janggyeong and the maternal uncle of King Injong, Yun Im occupied a central position within the royal in-law faction known as the Taeyun. However, the faction fell from power during the Fourth literati purge of 1545, which occurred at the beginning of King Myeongjong's reign.

Yun Im was executed, and three of Yun Hŭngsin's elder brothers were also put to death in the aftermath. Yun himself, being only six years old at the time, was spared due to his youth. Following the purge, he was reduced to servitude and spent his early years as a slave in the household of a meritorious official.

=== Early career ===
Following King Seonjo's accession to the throne in 1567, in 1577, Yun Hŭngsin was emancipated from slavery and the confiscated family assets were returned when the posthumous reputation of Yun Im was officially restored. With the reinstatement of Yun Im's official titles, Yun Hŭngsin became eligible for bureaucratic appointment through the system of hereditary privilege.

However, his official career was marked by persistent difficulties. In the 10th month of 1580, Yun was dismissed from his post as Magistrate of Jincheon due to a lack of literacy—an inadequacy attributed to his prolonged years in servitude. In the 8th month of 1582, he was further impeached by the Office of the Inspector-General for misconduct. Nevertheless, in 1584, he was appointed Magistrate of Jindo, a position he held for approximately one year and two months.

== Imjin War ==
In 1592, Yun Hŭngsin was appointed Garrison Commander (Ch'ŏmsa) of Dadaepo on the recommendation of Right State Councillor Yu Sŏngnyong. On the 13th day of the 4th month, the Japanese First Division under Konishi Yukinaga appeared off the coast of Busan. That afternoon, upon receiving a signal from the Ŭngbong Beacon Station (응봉 봉수대; 鷹峯烽燧臺) indicating the approach of the Japanese fleet, Yun dispatched naval vessels and placed the garrison on heightened alert.

On the following day, the 14th of the fourth month, Japanese forces launched an assault on Busanjin, which was under the command of Chŏng Pal, and succeeded in capturing the fortress. As the Japanese advanced toward Dongnae, they also dispatched detachments to secure critical positions in the rear, including Sŏp'yŏngp'o (서평포; 西平浦) and Dadaepo.

=== Battle of Dadaejin and death ===
Sŏp'yŏngp'o was seized without resistance. At Dadaepo, however, Japanese forces met with firm opposition from Yun Hŭngsin and his garrison. On the 14th day of the 4th month, Yun successfully repelled the enemy's initial assault. Given Dadaepo's strategic location to the rear of Busanjin, a renewed attack was expected. Although his subordinate officers urged him to abandon the position and retreat, Yun resolved to remain and defend the fortress to the end.

On the 15th day of the 4th month, a second and reinforced Japanese assault overwhelmed the fortress. Yun Hŭngsin, together with his younger brother Yun Hŭngje, led the defense and engaged in fierce combat against the invading forces. Despite mounting resistance and multiple engagements, the garrison ultimately disintegrated under the weight of the enemy onslaught. Even as the situation deteriorated, Yun Hŭngsin refused to abandon his post and continued to resist until the very end. He was ultimately killed in action, and with his death, the fortress was finally overrun.

== Legacy ==
=== Posthumous titles ===
Compared to Busanjin, Dadaepo was smaller in scale, less strategically significant, and more geographically peripheral. Consequently, detailed accounts of the battle are limited. Nonetheless, fragmentary references to Yun Hŭngsin's death appear in thee Veritable Records of Seonjo and Yu Sŏngnyong's Jingbirok. Additionally, Ku Samaeng recorded Yun's final stand and composed a commemorative poem in his honor.

During the reign of King Sukjong, Yun Hŭngsin was posthumously promoted to Vice Minister of War. Later, in 1854, Pak Kyusu submitted a proposal recommending Yun's further elevation to Minister of War, the granting of official emoluments to his descendants, and the bestowal of a posthumous honorific title. While the promotion to Minister of War appears to have been implemented, no surviving records confirm the conferral of an honorific title.

=== Memorials ===
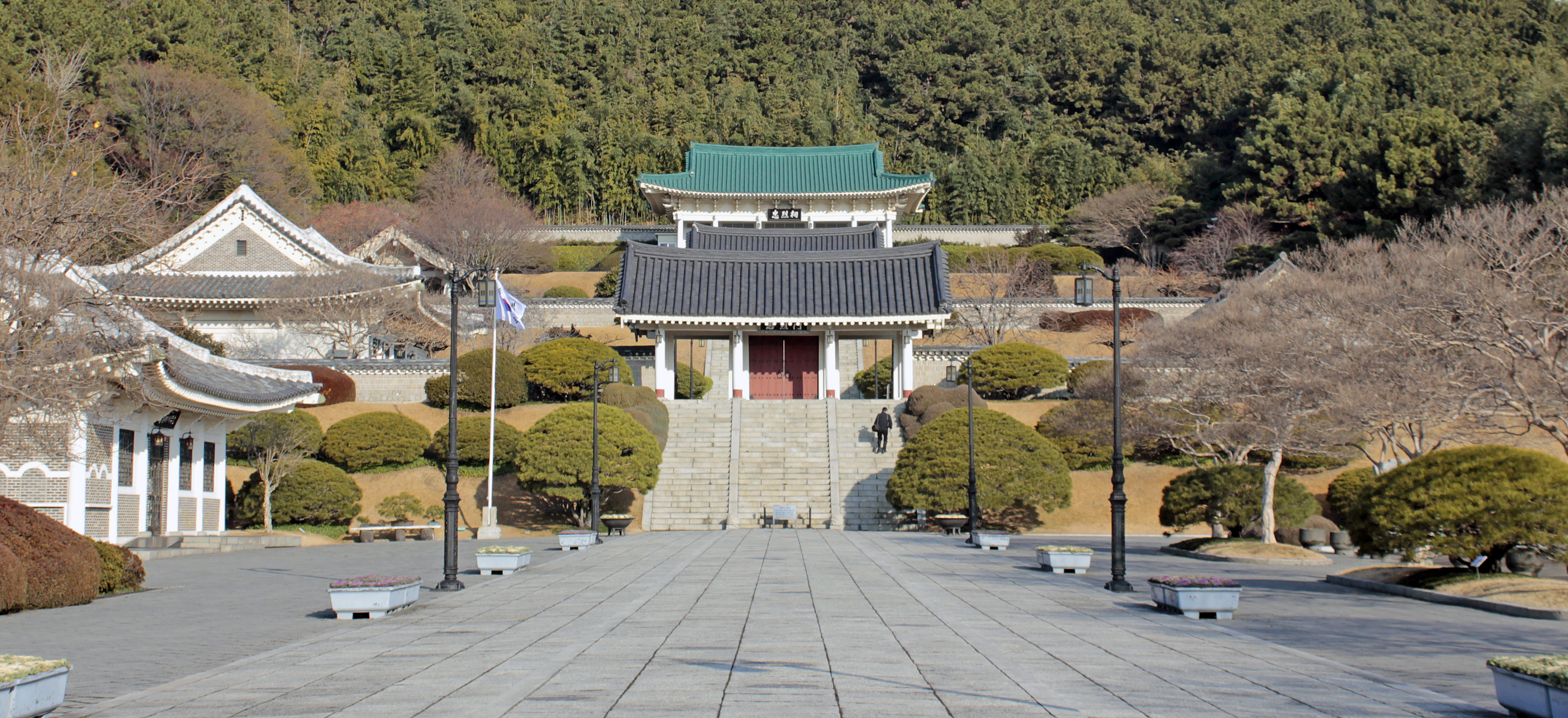
Chungnyeolsa in Busan

In 1757, Cho Ŏm was appointed Magistrate of Dongnae. Noting that Yun Hŭngsin had not been enshrined alongside Song Sanghyŏn and Chŏng Pal at Chungnyeolsa, he found this omission noteworthy and initiated an investigation into Yun's actions during the war. While serving as Governor of Gyeongsang Province in 1761, Cho submitted a memorial to the royal court regarding Yun's patriotic sacrifice. As a result, in 1772, Yun Hŭngsin was officially enshrined at Ch'ungnyŏlsa alongside Chŏng Pal and Song Sanghyŏn.

In 1766, when Yi Haemun (이해문; 李海文) was appointed Garrison Commander of Dadaepo, he established a commemorative altar within the fortress named Yungongdan (윤공단; 尹公壇) and began conducting annual memorial rites on the 15th day of the 4th month to honor Yun Hŭngsin. Intending to erect a stele in Yun's memory, Yi requested Cho Ŏm to compose an inscription and acquired a monument for the purpose. However, Yi was transferred from his post before the project could be completed.

The stele was ultimately erected in 1841 through the efforts of Cho Ŏm's grandson, Cho Inyŏng. At Cho's request, Hong Chongŭng, then serving as Magistrate of Dongnae, engraved the preexisting text drafted by Cho Chingwan (조진관; 趙鎭寬), Cho Ŏm's son, and added a brief explanation of the circumstances under which the dedication had been finalized.
