= Cho Yŏnggyu =

Korean general (1535–1592)

- 조영규
- Born: 1535; Jangseong, Joseon
- Died: 15th day, 4th month of 1592; Dongnae, Joseon
- Cause of death: Killed in action
- Military career
- Allegiance: Joseon
- Conflicts: Imjin War; Siege of Dongnae †

Korean name
- Hangul: 조영규
- Hanja: 趙英圭
- RR: Jo Yeonggyu
- MR: Cho Yŏnggyu

Courtesy name
- Hangul: 옥첨, 국헌
- Hanja: 玉瞻, 國獻
- RR: Okcheom, Gukheon
- MR: Okch'ŏm, Kukhŏn

Cho Yŏnggyu (Korean: 조영규; Hanja: 趙英圭; 1535–15th day, 4th month of 1592) was a Korean military leader of the mid-Joseon period. He is remembered for his death in battle the early stages of the Imjin War while serving as Magistrate of Yangsan.

Born in Jangseong in 1535, Cho Yŏnggyu passed the military examination in 1554. He began his official career as Officer in the Military Training Office and subsequently held various posts in both central and provincial administration. Following the death of his father, he temporarily withdrew from government service to observe the prescribed three-year mourning period. Upon resuming his duties, he served as Magistrate in multiple counties and became noted for his consistent care and devotion to his mother, whom he personally attended throughout his appointments. In 1592, he was appointed Magistrate of Yangsan.

On the 14th day of the 4th month in 1592, when Japanese forces launched their assault on Busan, Cho Yŏnggyu led his troops to Dongnae Fortress, where he joined Song Sanghyŏn in preparing for its defense. He then briefly returned to Yangsan to bid farewell to his elderly mother and instructed his son, Cho Chŏngno, to escort her back to their hometown. He subsequently broke through Japanese encirclement to rejoin the defenders at Dongnae.

Following intense combat, the fortress fell to Japanese forces, and Cho Yŏnggyu was killed in action. His son later held a symbolic funeral, as the remains could not be recovered. In the years that followed, Cho's acts of filial devotion and public service came to wider recognition. He was posthumously honored with an honorary gates and promoted to Vice Minister of Taxation. He was later enshrined at Chungnyeolsa in Yangsan, Moam Seowon in Jangseong, and Chungnyeolsa in Busan.

== Early life and career ==
=== Birth and education ===
Cho Yŏnggyu was born in 1535 in Paegam (백암; 白岩), located in Jangseong County, Jeolla Province. His father, Cho Chun (조준; 趙準), held the position of Vice Captain of Cultivated Righteousness (수의부위; 修義副尉), while his mother was a member of the Papyeong Yun clan. Renowned from an early age for his keen intellect and remarkable physical strength, Cho abandoned his initial pursuit of the civil service examination and instead opted for the military path. In 1554, he passed the military examination and entered government service as a military official.

=== Early career ===
His first official post was as an Officer (초관; 哨官) in the Military Training Office (훈련원; 訓鍊院), marking the commencement of his bureaucratic career within the central government. Upon the conclusion of this initial appointment, he was promoted to various posts, including Administrative Assistant (판관; 判官) and Recorder (주부; 主簿) in the Office of Royal Stables (사복시; 司僕寺). He later received provincial assignments, serving as Assistant Magistrate (판관; 判官) of Jeju and subsequently as Magistrate of Mujang (무장; 茂長). Following the death of his father, however, Cho tendered his resignation and temporarily withdrew from public service to fulfill the prescribed mourning rites.

After completing the three-year mourning period for his father, Cho Yŏnggyu resumed government service and successively held the post of Magistrate in several counties, including Man'gyŏng (만경; 萬頃), Yeongam, Nagan (낙안; 樂安), and Ryongchon. Throughout his appointments, he garnered a reputation as an upright and incorruptible local administrator. Notably, during his tenure as Magistrate of Man'gyŏng in 1574, Pak Minhŏn (박민헌; 朴民獻), then Governor of Jeolla Province, submitted a formal recommendation commending Cho for his meritorious governance.

Following the death of his father, Cho displayed exceptional filial devotion to his mother, personally accompanying her to each of his postings. However, upon his appointment to the northern frontier county of Ryongchon in Pyongan Province, the remoteness of the region rendered it impractical for her to accompany him. After completing his term in Ryongchon, he was assigned to Yŏnghae (영해; 寧海) and in 1592, he assumed the post of Magistrate of Yangsan.

== Imjin War ==
=== Battle of Dongnae ===
On the 14th day of the 4th month in 1592, as Japanese forces launched their assault on Busan, troops from the Gyeongju garrison were mobilized to Dongnae under the Joseon military strategy of Chesŭng Pangnyak, which emphasized concentrated regional defense. Cho Yŏnggyu, then Magistrate of Yangsan, led the forces of the Yangsan garrison to Dongnaeeupseong, where he was appointed Central Division Commander (중위장; 中衛將). There, Cho met with Song Sanghyŏn, and the two resolved to share life and death in defense of the fortress.

Shortly thereafter, Cho briefly returned to Yangsan to bid farewell to his elderly mother and instructed his son, Cho Chŏngno (조정로; 趙廷老), to escort her safely back to their ancestral home. Steadfast in his decision to fight, Cho made his way back to Dongnaeeupseong, breaking through the Japanese encirclement and reentering the fortress through the north gate.

On the 15th day of the 4th month, Yi Kak, the Provincial Military Commander of the Left Division of Gyeongsang, arrived at Dongnaeeupseong. He ordered a reconnaissance operation and established his camp at Sosan (소산; 蘇山). In response, Cho Yŏnggyu led a detachment of approximately one hundred soldiers to carry out the mission. Upon his return, he reported that the enemy forces were overwhelming in number and beyond the capacity of local troops to resist effectively.

Subsequently, an advance unit of the Japanese army demanded surrender, but Song Sanghyŏn refused, triggering the onset of battle. The Japanese then launched a coordinated, multi-pronged assault from the east, west, and south, encircling the fortress. Ultimately, they breached the stronghold by penetrating the northeastern wall, leading to the fall of the fortress.

=== Death ===
When the fortress fell, Cho Yŏnggyu turned northward, bowed four times as a gesture of farewell to the king, and was killed in action at the age of 58. His son, Cho Chŏngno, who had returned to Jangseong, later traveled to Dongnae in an effort to recover his father's remains. However, due to the large number of casualties, he was unable to identify the body. He ultimately returned to their hometown and conducted a symbolic funeral with an empty coffin.

== Legacy ==
In 1669, following a memorial submitted by Song Chun''gil, Cho Yŏnggyu's acts of filial devotion and loyalty were brought to the attention of the royal court. In recognition, an honorary gate was bestowed, and a double gate commemorating both loyalty and filial piety was erected. During the reign of King Sukjong, Cho was posthumously promoted to Vice Minister (참판; 參判) of Taxation.

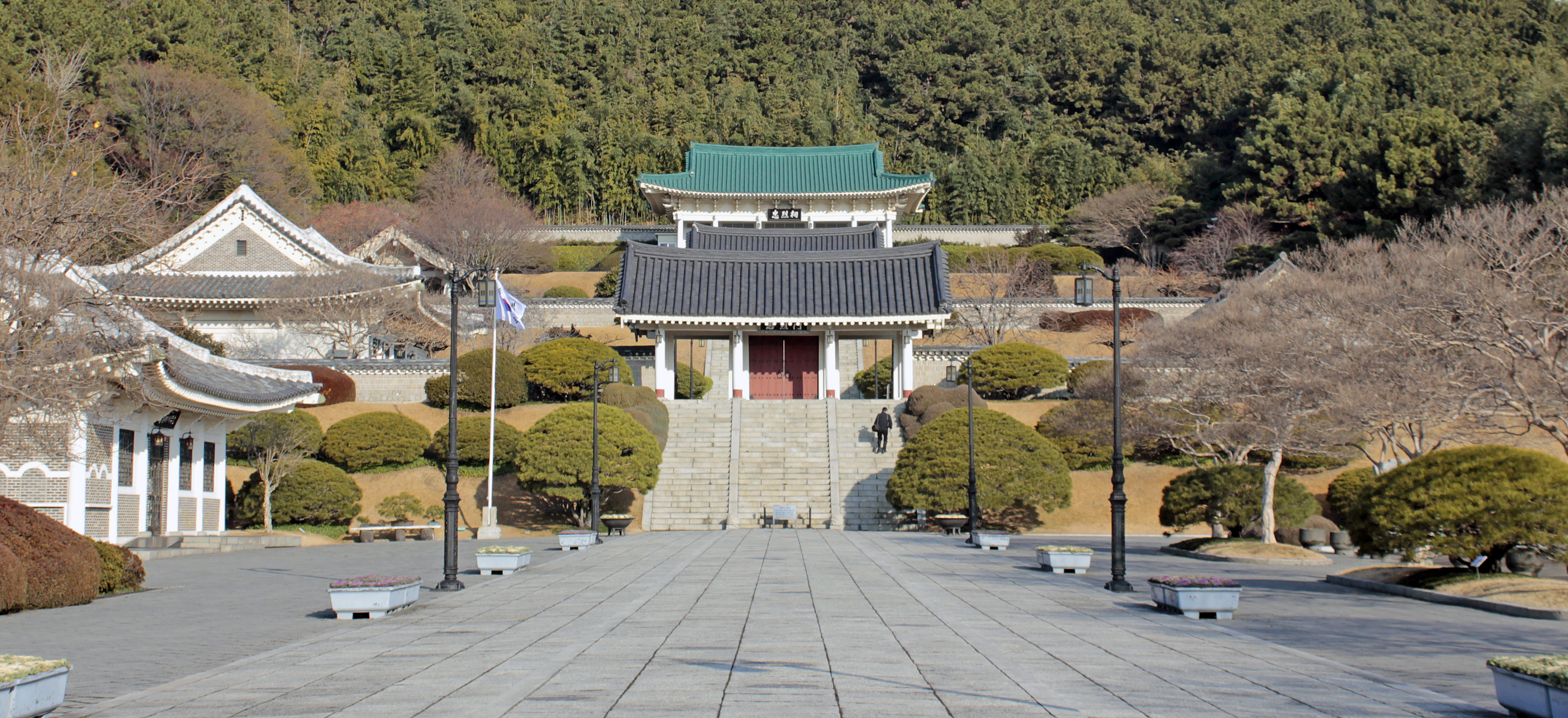
Chungnyeolsa in Busan

In 1667, he was enshrined at Moam Seowon (모암서원; 慕菴書院) in his native Jangseong. Later, in 1696, he was also enshrined at Chungnyeolsa in Yangsan, where he had formerly served as magistrate. In 1709, Kwŏn Ijin, then Magistrate of Dongnae, established an auxiliary shrine on the original site of Chungnyeolsa in Dongnae to honor Cho Yŏnggyu and submitted a request for official recognition, which was approved the following year. Subsequently, in 1735, upon the submission of a memorial by Min Ŭngsu, the auxiliary shrine was merged with the main Chungnyeolsa, thereby enshrining Cho Yŏnggyu alongside Song Sanghyŏn and Chŏng Pal.
