= Siege of Dongnae =

1592 Japan–Korea battle

The siege of Dongnae
- Part of Imjin War
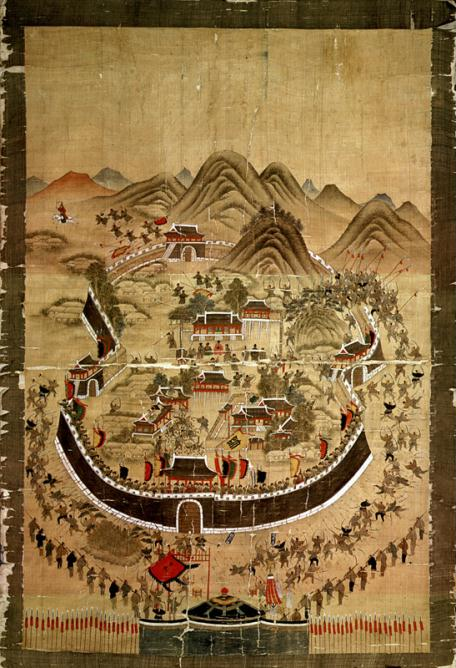
- The siege of Dongnae
Date	May 25, 1592 (Gregorian Calendar); April 15, 1592 (Lunar calendar);
Location	Dongnae Citadel 35.2036°N 129.0838°E
Result	Japanese victory

Belligerents
Toyotomi Japan	Kingdom of Joseon

Commanders and leaders
Konishi Yukinaga; Sō Yoshitoshi	Song Sanghyŏn †; Cho Yŏnggyu †; Yi Ŏnsŏng; Yi Kak; Pak Hong; No Kaebang †; Hong Yun'gwan †

Strength
18,000 men	2,500–3,000 men total: 20,000 (including civilians and militia)

Casualties and losses
100 killed 400 wounded	3,000 killed 500 POW (Korean records) 5,000 killed (Japanese records)
- Location within South Korea

The siege of Dongnae (Korean: 동래성 전투) was a siege that occurred on May 25, 1592 (Korean calendar: April 15, 1592) during the 1592–1598 Japanese invasions of Korea. It resulted in the capture by Japanese forces of Dongnaeeupseong, a mountain fortress on the way to Hanseong (Seoul).

== Background ==
After the fall of Busan, the Japanese army had to secure their bridgehead, because ten kilometres to the north of Busan lay the fortress of Dongnae, which was situated in a very strong position atop a hill, dominating the main road north to Hanseong. Dongnae was a walled citadel on a hilltop commanded by the 41-year-old prefect, Song Sanghyŏn, and the fortress was packed with over 20,000 soldiers, poorly trained and equipped conscripts, and panicked civilian refugees from Busan and surrounding areas.

== The march and the siege of Dongnae ==
After resting overnight at Busan, the First Division left at 6:00 AM the following morning, marched around the bay without delay, and arrived at Dongnae around 8 AM two hours later. Its prefect, Song Sanghyŏn, hurriedly gathered all the town-people and what soldiers he could find such as Cho Yŏnggyu, the magistrate of Yangsan. As soon as the Japanese completed the investment of the fortress surrounding it in five lines, with other troops crowding on the nearby fields and prepared to storm the fortress. Song took up his position in the upper story of the great gate of the fortress where, in accordance with Korean custom, he beat the great drum and urged on his soldiers in the fight. Konishi Yukinaga erected a message board saying, "Fight if you want to, or let us pass", for a clear road through to China. It was again rejected by Song with the words, "It is easy for me to die, but difficult to let you pass”. Konishi Yukinaga then followed in personally leading the attack against Dongnae, in which he ordered for the commander to be captured alive.

== The battle ==
The battle began soon after 8 AM. According to Japanese accounts it lasted for four hours, but according to Korean accounts it lasted for twelve. The besieged Koreans, including women, fired arrows and spears at the Japanese as Song beat a drum from the upper floor of his donjon to urge the defenders on. Even though the men that Song Sanghyŏn wielded were ill-equipped and poorly trained, the gallant defenders fought for eight hours before the enemy effected an entrance over their dead bodies. However, as was the case at Busan, the superior firepower of the Japanese arquebus decimated the defenders. During a lull in the fighting, a Japanese vanguard of 100 men scaled the walls with ladders and the rest followed, taking the fortress in hand-to-hand combat. Song Sanghyŏn was captured, but when he refused to bow, he was hacked to death. According to Japanese sources, Japanese casualties included 100 killed and 400 wounded, whereas Korean losses were over 5,000. According to Korean sources, at least 3,000 of the defenders were killed and 500 were taken prisoner.

== The fall ==
When Yi Kak, the cautious, and Gen. Pak Hong who was with him, heard of the fall of Dongnae, they fled, together with their forces. After the fall of Dongnae many people were killed, which implies a massacre similar to that what happened at Busan.

== Aftermath ==
Konishi's deputy, Sō Yoshitoshi, had hoped that Song Sanghyŏn would have been captured alive, as he had been hospitably treated by Song during his prewar visits to Korea. On learning of Song's death, he ordered that his body be buried in a marked grave on the hillside behind the castle, where it was later reclaimed by his family members.

On 26 May, Sō Yoshitoshi sent a scout force to Yangsan Castle, the next point on the road to Hanseong. The scouts frightened the defenders so much with gunfire that they abandoned their posts and fled. The castle was taken the following morning.

Konishi Yukinaga's army left Dongnae in the afternoon for Miryang, the next castle on the road, and took it after a minor skirmish. After that he took the undefended Daegu on 28 May and crossed the also undefended Nakdong River before receiving news of a Joseon army awaiting him at Sangju.

Gyeongsang Right Navy Commander Wŏn Kyun was in a state of panic on learning of the fall of Busan and Dongnae and the self-destruction of the Gyeongsang Left Navy fleet by Commander Pak Hong. He attempted to withdraw his ships to Hansando but mistook a bunch of fishing ships for the Japanese fleet. He proceeded to destroy his weapons and stores, and to scuttle his fleet. He was dissuaded from deserting his command by his subordinates, by which time he had only four vessels remaining

With the fall of Dongnae the Japanese bridgehead was secured and the road to the north was open. Busan and Dongnae fortress were quickly garrisoned, and the harbor of Busan began to provide a safe and almost unchallenged landing stage to disembark more than 100,000 Japanese soldiers with their equipment, horses, and supplies over the next month.

== Legend ==
The Japanese general in command So Yoshitoshi was so impressed with the bravery of this prefect that he had his body decently buried and erected over his grave a wooden monument on which he wrote “A Loyal Subject”, an epitaph than which none could be more grateful to a true Korean gentleman.

The cool defiance of Song Sanghyŏn has become a legend in Korea, and in the Chungnyolsa shrine at the foot of the castle hill in Dongnae, where he is honored beside Chŏng Pal and Yun Hŭngsin, there is a dramatic painting of him sitting impassively in his chair as the fierce Japanese approach.

== See also ==
- List of castles in Korea
- List of battles during the Japanese invasions of Korea (1592–1598)
- Timeline of the Japanese invasions of Korea

== Bibliography ==
- Alagappa, Muthiah (2003), Asian Security Order: Instrumental and Normative Features, Stanford University Press, ISBN 978-0-8047-4629-8
- Arano, Yasunori (2005), The Formation of a Japanocentric World Order, International Journal of Asian Studies
- Brown, Delmer M. (May 1948), "The Impact of Firearms on Japanese Warfare, 1543–1598", The Far Eastern Quarterly, 7 (3): 236–53, doi:10.2307/2048846, JSTOR 2048846, S2CID 162924328
- Eikenberry, Karl W. (1988), "The Imjin War", Military Review, 68 (2): 74–82
- Ha, Tae-hung; Sohn, Pow-key (1977), 'Nanjung Ilgi: War Diary of Admiral Yi Sun-sin, Yonsei University Press, ISBN 978-89-7141-018-9
- Haboush, JaHyun Kim (2016), The Great East Asian War and the Birth of the Korean Nation
- Hawley, Samuel (2005), The Imjin War, The Royal Asiatic Society, Korea Branch/UC Berkeley Press, ISBN 978-89-954424-2-5
- Jang, Pyun-soon (1998), Noon-eu-ro Bo-nen Han-gook-yauk-sa 5: Gor-yeo Si-dae (눈으로 보는 한국역사 5: 고려시대), Park Doo-ui, Bae Keum-ram, Yi Sang-mi, Kim Ho-hyun, Kim Pyung-sook, et al., Joog-ang Gyo-yook-yaun-goo-won. 1998-10-30. Seoul, Korea.
- Kim, Ki-chung (Fall 1999), "Resistance, Abduction, and Survival: The Documentary Literature of the Imjin War (1592–8)", Korean Culture, 20 (3): 20–29
- Kim, Yung-sik (1998), "Problems and Possibilities in the Study of the History of Korean Science", Osiris, 2nd Series, 13: 48–79, doi:10.1086/649280, JSTOR 301878, S2CID 143724260
- 桑田忠親 [Kuwata, Tadachika], ed., 舊參謀本部編纂, [Kyu Sanbo Honbu], 朝鮮の役 [Chousen no Eki] (日本の戰史 [Nihon no Senshi] Vol. 5), 1965.
- Neves, Jaime Ramalhete (1994), "The Portuguese in the Im-Jim War?", Review of Culture, 18: 20–24
- Niderost, Eric (June 2001), "Turtleboat Destiny: The Imjin War and Yi Sun Shin", Military Heritage, 2 (6): 50–59, 89
- Niderost, Eric (January 2002), "The Miracle at Myongnyang, 1597", Osprey Military Journal, 4 (1): 44–50
- Park, Yune-hee (1973), Admiral Yi Sun-shin and His Turtleboat Armada: A Comprehensive Account of the Resistance of Korea to the 16th Century Japanese Invasion, Shinsaeng Press
- Rockstein, Edward D. (1993), Strategic And Operational Aspects of Japan's Invasions of Korea 1592–1598 1993-6-18, Naval War College
- Sadler, A. L. (June 1937), "The Naval Campaign in the Korean War of Hideyoshi (1592–1598)", Transactions of the Asiatic Society of Japan, Second Series, 14: 179–208
- Sansom, George (1961), A History of Japan 1334–1615, Stanford University Press, ISBN 978-0-8047-0525-7
- Sohn, Pow-key (April–June 1959), "Early Korean Painting", Journal of the American Oriental Society, 79 (2): 96–103, doi:10.2307/595851, JSTOR 595851
- Stramigioli, Giuliana (December 1954), "Hideyoshi's Expansionist Policy on the Asiatic Mainland", Transactions of the Asiatic Society of Japan, Third Series, 3: 74–116
- Strauss, Barry (Summer 2005), "Korea's Legendary Admiral", MHQ: The Quarterly Journal of Military History, 17 (4): 52–61
- Swope, Kenneth M. (2006), "Beyond Turtleboats: Siege Accounts from Hideyoshi's Second Invasion of Korea, 1597–1598", Sungkyun Journal of East Asian Studies, 6 (2): 177–206
- Swope, Kenneth M. (2005), "Crouching Tigers, Secret Weapons: Military Technology Employed During the Sino-Japanese-Korean War, 1592–1598", The Journal of Military History, 69: 11–42, doi:10.1353/jmh.2005.0059, S2CID 159829515
- Swope, Kenneth M. (December 2002), "Deceit, Disguise, and Dependence: China, Japan, and the Future of the Tributary System, 1592–1596", The International History Review, 24 (4): 757–1008, doi:10.1080/07075332.2002.9640980, S2CID 154827808
- Swope, Kenneth M. (2009), A Dragon's Head and a Serpent's Tail: Ming China and the First Great East Asian War, 1592–1598, University of Oklahoma Press
- Turnbull, Stephen (2002), Samurai Invasion: Japan's Korean War 1592–98, Cassell & Co, ISBN 978-0-304-35948-6
- Turnbull, Stephen (2008), The Samurai Invasion of Korea 1592-98, Osprey Publishing Ltd
- Turnbull, Stephen (1998), The Samurai Sourcebook, Cassell & Co, ISBN 978-1-85409-523-7
- Villiers, John (1980), SILK and Silver: Macau, Manila and Trade in the China Seas in the Sixteenth Century (A lecture delivered to the Hong Kong Branch of the Royal Asiatic Society at the Hong Kong Club. 10 June 1980). The HKUL Digital Initiatives
- Yi, Min-woong (2004), Imjin Wae-ran Haejeonsa: The Naval Battles of the Imjin War [임진왜란 해전사], Chongoram Media [청어람미디어], ISBN 978-89-89722-49-6
