= Chungnyeolsa (Busan) =

Shrine in South Korea

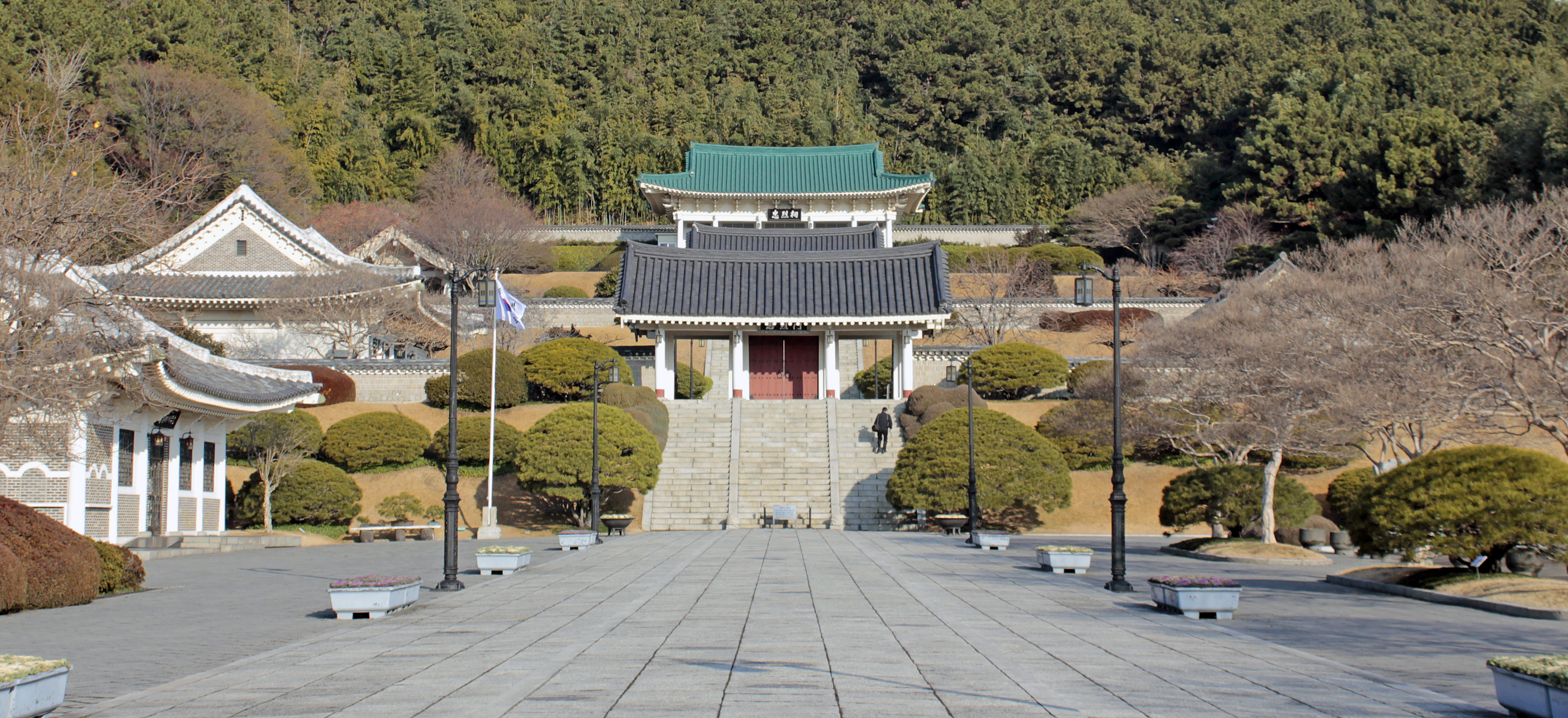

Korean name
- Hangul: 충렬사
- Hanja: 忠烈祠
- RR: Chungnyeolsa
- MR: Ch'ungnyŏlsa

Chungnyeolsa (Korean: 충렬사; Hanja: 忠烈祠) is a shrine commemorating the spirits of those who fought against the Japanese troops during the Japanese invasions of Korea of 1592.

The present Chungnyeolsa was first built in 1605 as Songgongsa, within the South Gate of Dongnae eupseong by Yun Hwon, the Deputy Delegate of Dongnae. He enshrined Song Sanghyŏn and performed annual rituals to Song. In 1624, at the suggestion of Lee Min-goo, the name of the temple was changed to Chungnyeolsa, also enshrining Chŏng Pal, a fighter who died a heroic death at Busanjin Fortress.

In 1625, Chungnyeolsa was moved to the current location and renamed Allak Seowon with the construction of an auditorium and Dongseojae, serving both the functions of a temple house and a library. The two new buildings were constructed to remember the academic and military victory of those enshrined.

In 1709, a separate building was built at the original location of Songgongsa, in memory of Cho Yŏnggyu, No Kaebang, the Dongnae Kyosoo, Mun Deok-gyeom, Yang Jo-han, Song Bong-su (the Bijang), Kim Hui-soo, Sin Yeo-ro, Song Baek, and Kim Sang, all of whom died in battle with Song Sanghyŏn and Chŏng Pal.

In 1736, the people enshrined at the separate buildings were all gathered at Chungnyeolsa, and in 1772, Yun Hŭngsin, the Dadaecheomsa, was also enshrined here, while a sanctuary was built outside the East Gate of Chungnyeolsa in memory of Geumseom and Aehyang, both of whom died after Song Sanghyŏn and Chŏng Pal.

Chungnyeolsa went through more remodeling and restoration thereafter, and is currently composed of 16 buildings, including the main hall. 92 memorial tablets are enshrined in memory of those who died in the Busan area, fighting against the Japanese troops. A sacrificial rite is performed on May 25 annually by the citizens of Busan.
