= Kim Myŏngwŏn =

Joseon scholar-official (1534–1603)

Kim Myŏngwŏn 김명원

Left State Councillor
- In office 16th day, 5th month of 1601 – 10th day, 12th month of 1602
- Preceded by: Yi Hŏn'guk
- Succeeded by: Yun Sŭnghun

Right State Councillor
- In office 17th day, 6th month of 1600 – 16th day, 5th month of 1601
- Preceded by: Yi Hŏn'guk
- Succeeded by: Yun Sŭnghun

Personal details
- Born: 1534
- Died: 10th day, 12th month of 1602
- Awards: 3rd merit subjects of Pyŏngnan

Korean name
- Hangul: 김명원
- Hanja: 金命元
- RR: Gim Myeongwon
- MR: Kim Myŏngwŏn

Art name
- Hangul: 주은
- Hanja: 酒隱
- RR: Jueun
- MR: Chuŭn

Courtesy name
- Hangul: 응순
- Hanja: 應順
- RR: Eungsun
- MR: Ŭngsun

Kim Myŏngwŏn (Korean: 김명원; Hanja: 金命元; 1534 – 10th day, 12th month of 1602), was a high official of the Korean state Joseon, who served King Seonjo during the Imjin War.

Born to a yangban family of the Gyeongju Kim clan, he was the son of another high-ranking official, Kim Mangyun (김만균; 金萬鈞). He passed the civil service examination with the highest score in 1561, and was made chwach'amch'an, a post of the second junior rank under the State Council. He gained prominence in 1589 when he exposed the treachery of provincial official Chŏng Yŏrip, who was plotting to attack the capital. At this time, he received the title of "Prince Kyŏngnim" (경림군).

Upon the outbreak of war in 1592, Kim took up military duty, leading the Joseon army to consecutive defeats at the capital and again at the Imjin River. However, he remained vital to the royal family, as he led the army which guarded their retreat to Sunan in the far north following the surrender of Pyongyang. After the first wave of the war was over, Kim retired from his post as general due to illness. He subsequently served in four ministerial posts in turn, those of Punishments, Rites, Public Works, and Military Affairs. Kim led the Joseon armies once again after the Japanese re-invasion of 1597. He was made Right State Councilor (uŭijŏng, 우의정) of the State Council in that year.

After his death, Kim was given the posthumous title of Ch'ungik-gong (忠翼公), "Loyal-winged general."

== See also ==
- List of Joseon Dynasty people
- Joseon Dynasty politics
- Hideyoshi's invasions of Korea
