= Ŭigŭmbu =

Joseon judicial office

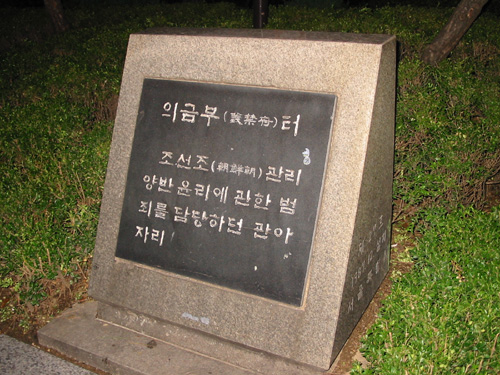
The site of Ŭigŭmbu in Seoul

Ŭigŭmbu (Korean: 의금부; Hanja: 義禁府; RR: Uigeumbu), also known as Kŭmo or Wangbu, was the Joseon royal law enforcement body responsible for prosecuting treason and moral crimes based on Confucian principles (강상죄). Ordinary crimes were investigated and prosecuted by Hyeongjo. It played a crucial role in strengthening the authority of the monarchy.

== History ==
Sunmaso (순마소; 巡馬所), established during the reign of Chungnyeol of Goryeo when Goryeo was a Mongol tributary state, is the predecessor of Ŭigŭmbu. Sunmaso was originally created to monitor and meddle in Goryeo royal politics, under the pretext of maintaining public order. In its early days, Sunmaso patrolled the streets and policed burglary and theft, as intended. Toward the demise of the Goryeo dynasty, amid rampant corruption and chaos, Sunmaso's powers grew and came to include monitoring public officials in concert with Sahŏnbu (사헌부; 司憲府), quelling rebellion, routing foreign invasions, and defending the monarchy. In the late Goryeo dynasty, Sunmaso was renamed Sun'gunmanhobu (순군만호부; 巡軍萬戶府), indicating direct Mongolian influence.

After Yi Songgye's successful rebellion against King U of Goryeo, Sungunmanhobu forces supported Yi and purged Yi's political opponents in Gaegyeong, Goryeo's capital. Due to the unchecked growth of Sungunmanhobu's power, court officials urged Taejong to abolish the office. Notwithstanding, Taejong strengthened it and renamed it Uiyongsungeumsa (의용순금사; 義勇巡禁司). Later, Taejong reformed Uiyongsungeumsa, renaming it Ŭigŭmbu (의금부; 義禁府) and making it purely a law enforcement body, rid of military functions, that dealt with special crimes of treason, lèse-majesté, and violations of Confucian principles, such as adultery or impiety.

The system of the office changed several times throughout the Joseon Dynasty. In 1414 when Taejong reformed its predecessor and renamed the office to Ŭigŭmbu, the office was separated from its parent organization. According to Taejong's reforms, four officials were to run Ŭigŭmbu, but the number of officials was not consistent. There was no established tenure for the officials, and the king customarily appointed officials on a case-by-case basis. According to Gyeongguk daejeon, Joseon's national code of law, the codification of which was started by Sejo and completed by Seongjong, about 200 officials were responsible for handling judicial matters.

In 1894, Gojong of the Korean Empire changed the name to Ŭigŭmsa (의금사; 義禁司) and designated it as the sole authority for all judicial cases within Hanyang, thereby prohibiting other executive branches from arbitrarily hearing cases. Following the Kabo Reform, the office was renamed the High Court (고등재판소; 高等裁判所) and then in 1899, P'yŏngniwŏn (평리원; 平理院).

== See also ==
- Joseon dynasty
- Sŭngjŏngwŏn
