= Eonyang =

Coordinates: 35°34′N 129°07′E

- Eup (town)
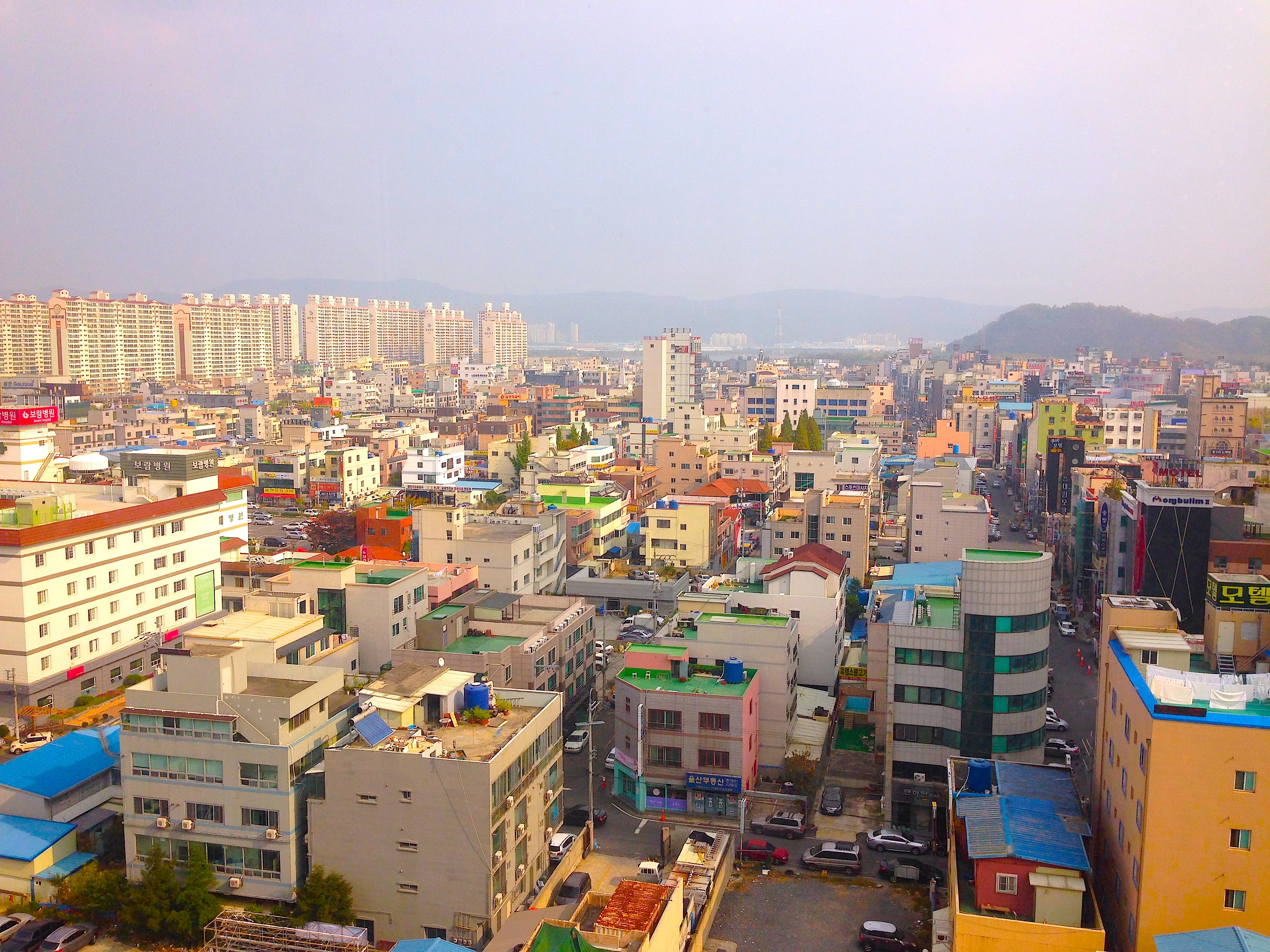
- View of downtown Eonyang in 2013

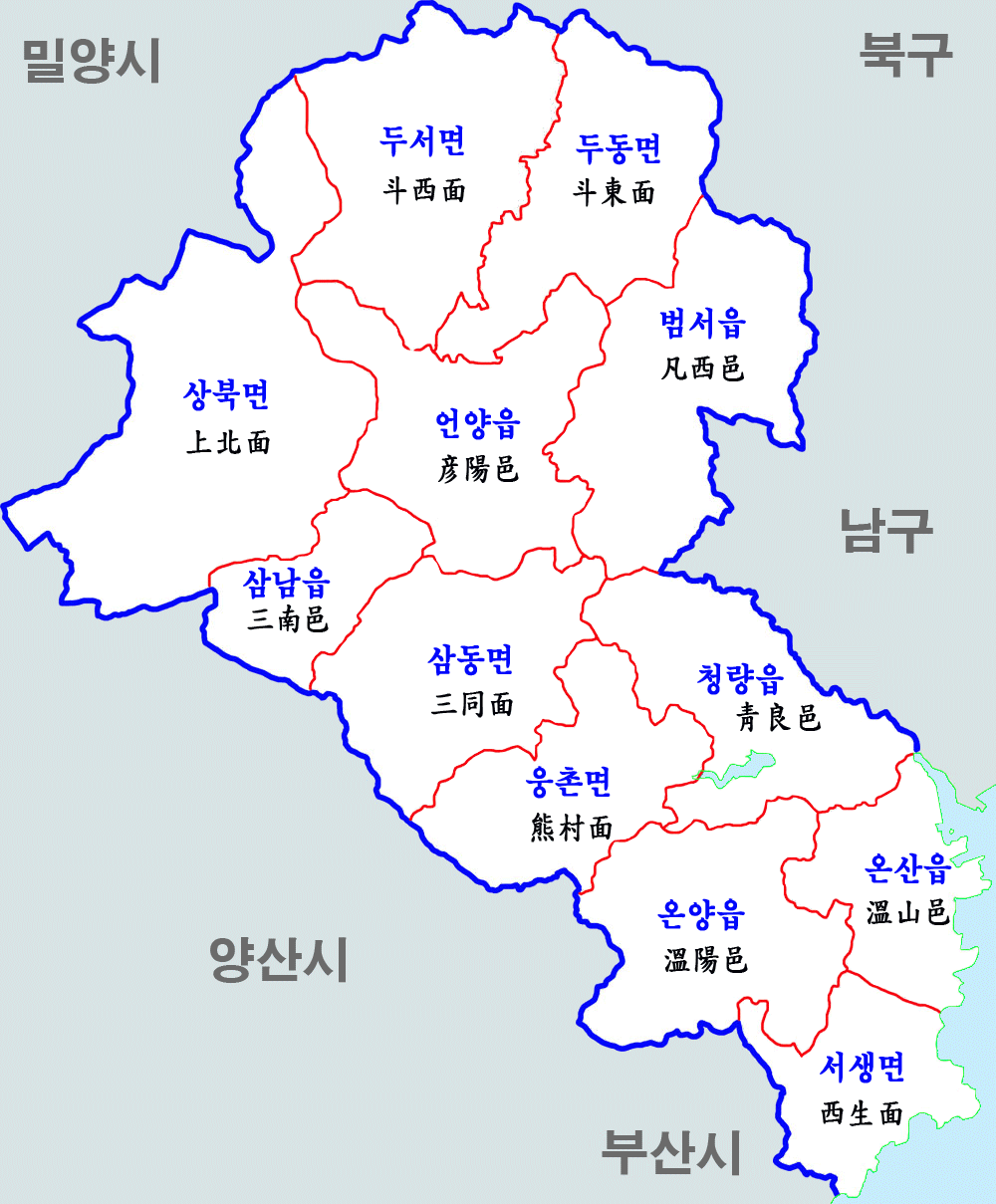
- Eonyang depicted in the Ulju County map.
- Country: South Korea
- Region: Yeongnam
- Provincial level: Ulsan

Area
  - Total: 68.8 km^{2} (26.6 sq mi)

Population (2023)
  - Total: 28,217
  - Density: 410/km^{2} (1,060/sq mi)
  - Dialect: Gyeongsang

Korean name
- Hangul: 언양읍
- Hanja: 彦陽邑
- RR: Eonyang-eup
- MR: Ŏnyang-ŭp

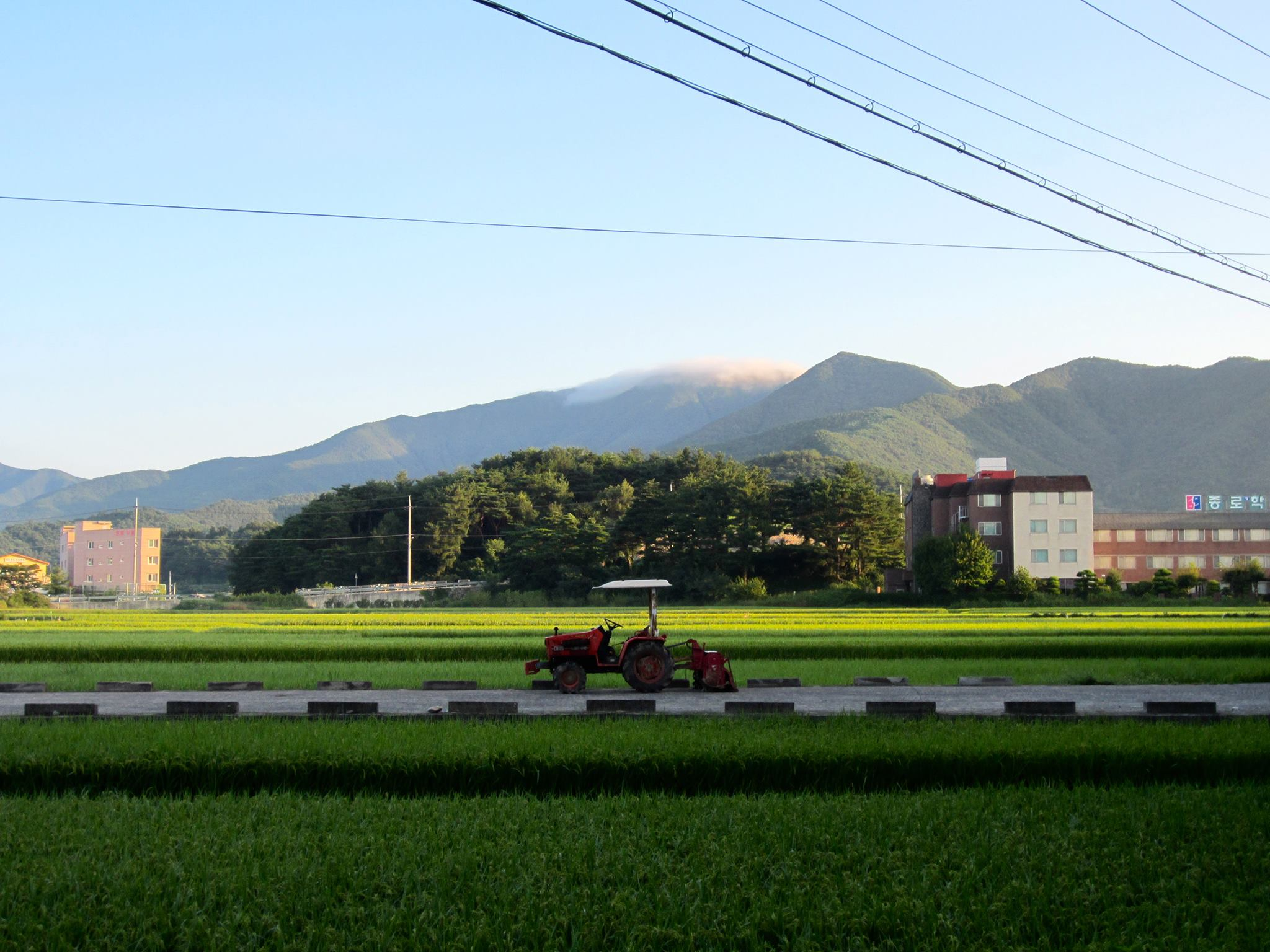
mountain view, Eonyang-eup

Eonyang (Korean: 언양) is an eup, or large village, in Ulju-gun, a largely rural district of Ulsan, South Korea. It is near the Seoknam Nun's Temple. It has a traditional market every five days.

== Education ==
Eonyang is home to two public schools which focus on science and technology.

UNIST (Ulsan National Institute of Science and Technology) is a university emphasizing science and technology. As of April 2012, the school has a teaching staff of 184, and a student population of more than 3,800.

Ulsan Science High School is a selective public boarding high school which focuses on the sciences. It is located in Sangbuk-myeon (상북면), near Eonyang. Founded in 2006, the school has advanced facilities and a large campus which is situated in a secluded, mountainous environment.

== Tourism ==
The 'Amethyst Cavern Park' is an abandoned amethyst mine which has subsequently become an Eonyang tourist attraction. The Amethyst Cavern Park contains caves which can be explored on foot, and a series of waterways. The park is also home to a small amusement park with a small selection of rides. Within the cave proper there are displays and dioramas depicting local cultural motifs, scenes specific to the cave's history, and some anthropological studies. The average temperature in the cave is 12~14 degrees Celsius. The cave is 2.5 kilometers long. In addition to the other, eclectic collection of attractions and displays available in and around the compound, one is also able to view large, rare specimens of the actual amethyst crystals for which the cave is named.

Eonyang Castle, designated as Historical Site No. 153, was first built in the Three Kingdoms period and has been officially preserved as an historical site. It differs from other Korean castles because of its location in a field, rather than on a mountain. The fortress is located in the geographical center of present-day Eonyang. Eonyang may have been strategically important because it served as a transportation hub connecting Gyeongju, Ulsan, Miryang and Yangsan. The fortress was originally built of mud, but in the Joseon period (14th century) was rebuilt using stone. The fortress is of significance to researchers because it demonstrates the transition of fortress construction between the Goryeo and Joseon political periods.

The Bangudae Petroglyphs (반구대 암각화) are designated as Korean National Treasure No. 285, and are located in Eonyang. The ancient rock carvings reproduce images of living creatures such as whales, turtles, tigers, and deer. Human beings are also depicted among the carvings, as well as various geometric shapes and designs. The purpose of these carvings is unknown.

The Yeongnam Alps are visited by tourists for views of Paraeso Falls in a recreational forest equipped with a cultural relaxation center, accommodation facilities and campsites and scenery of Mt. Sinbulsan.

== Dolmen in Eonyang ==
There are several dolmens, or megalithic tombs, in Eonyang. An example is the dolmen known by local residents as "Yongbau" (영바우). The dolmen is marked with a descriptive plaque containing information in Korean, English, and Japanese.

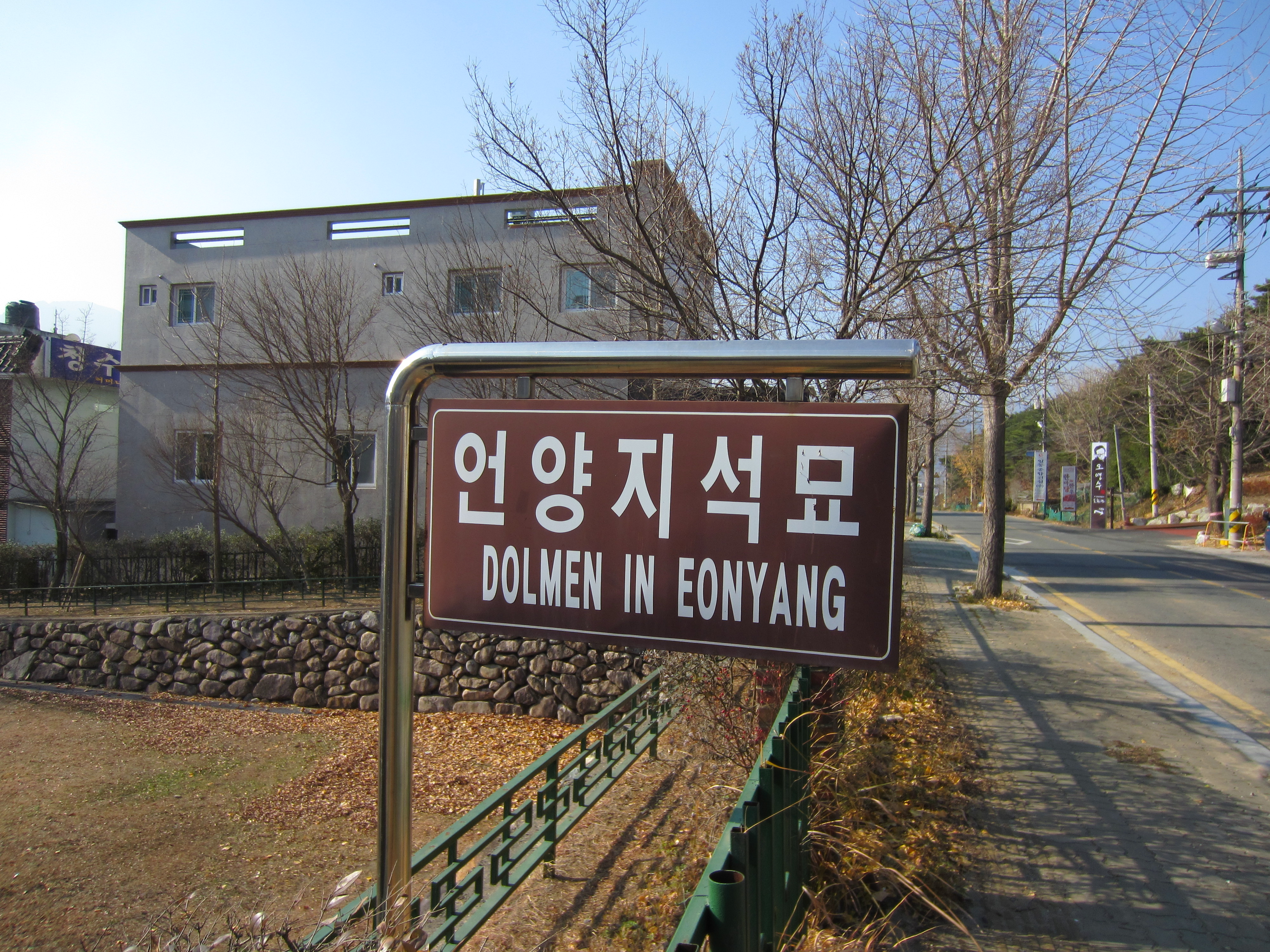
dolmen sign in Eonyang

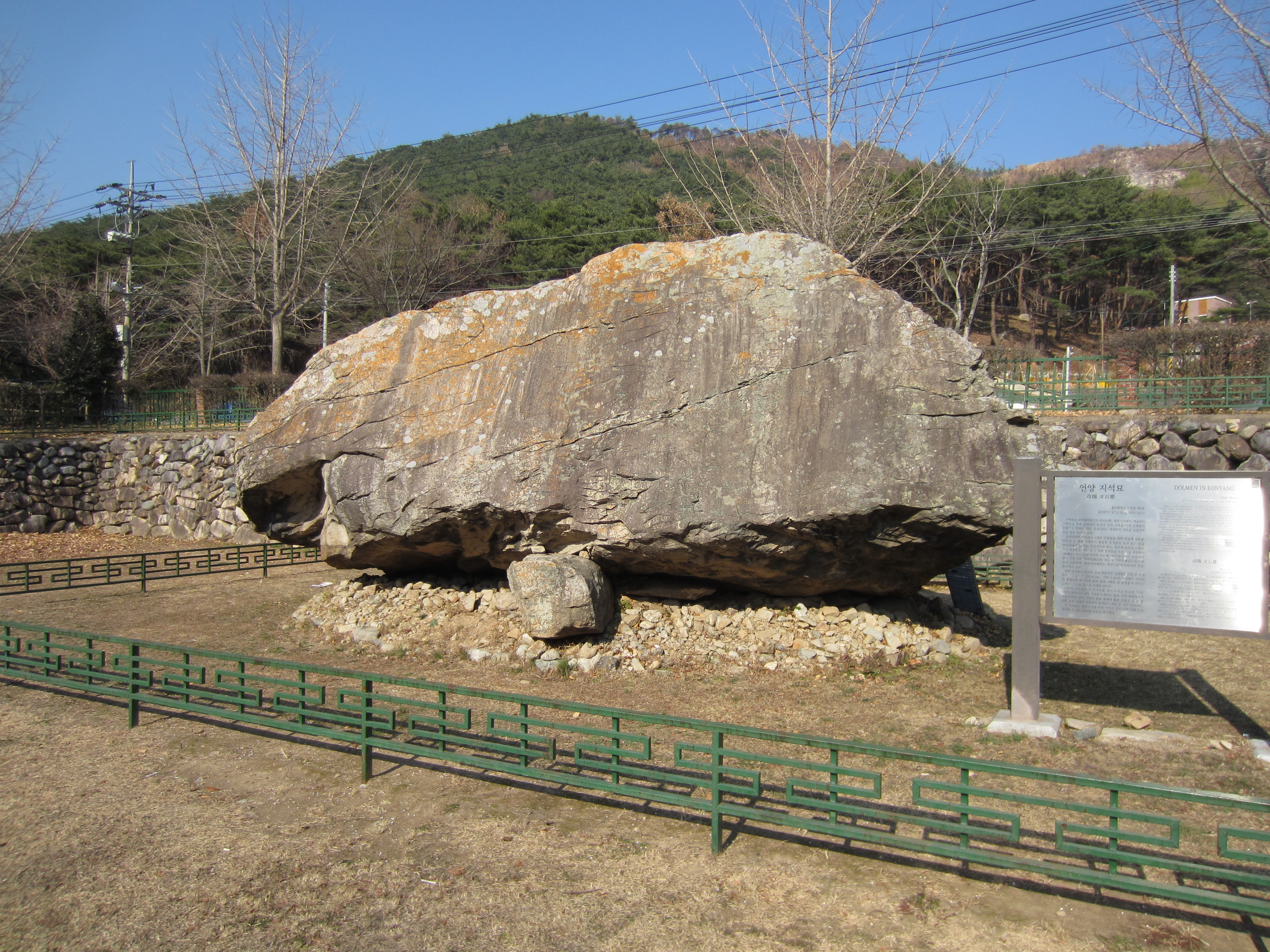
Yongbau Dolmen

== See also ==
- Subdivisions of South Korea
- Geography of South Korea
