= Sahŏnbu =

Goryeo and Joseon government office

- Hangul: 사헌부
- Hanja: 司憲府
- RR: Saheonbu
- MR: Sahŏnbu

Sahŏnbu (Korean: 사헌부; Hanja: 司憲府; lit. 'Office of the Inspector-General') was a government office during the Korean Goryeo and Joseon periods. It was led by the Inspector-General (대사헌) amd administered inspections, especially in the Joseon capital Hanseong (Seoul) and periphery. It was also responsible for licensing officials, impeachment and legal inquiries, which also extended to the control of king's relatives. An important duty was to remonstrate with the king.

== Responsibility ==
1. Regular meeting of royal court
2. Payment of national debts
3. Tributes
4. Administration of Gwageo (civil service exams)

The system began in China, where the office played a wider role at the royal court. In this sense, the office and its responsibility was in line with Saganwon where the subjects remonstrate the order of King.

The issue of royal court was to control over the power between the king and the subjects, keeping abreast of the order of the government, which later produced severe side effects in some cases. Its work was somewhat similar to the board of audits and inspection in current time.

== See also ==
- Uigeumbu
- Seungjeongwon
