= Chŏng Pal =

Korean general (1553–1592)

Duke Ch'ungjang Chŏng Pal
- 정발
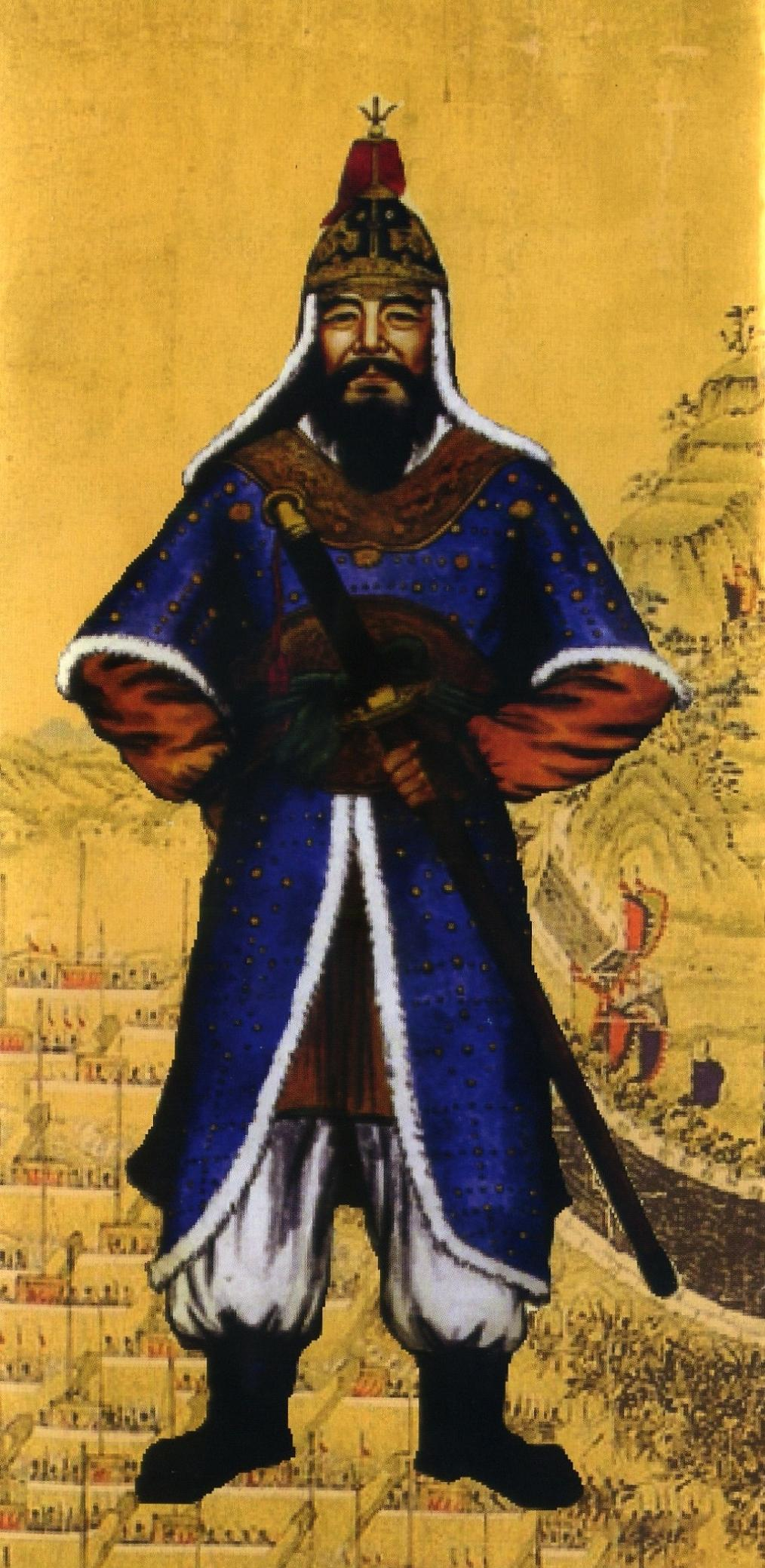
- Born: 1553; Yŏnch'ŏn, Joseon
- Died: 14th day, 4th month of 1592; Pusanjin, Joseon
- Cause of death: Killed in action
- Burial place: Yeoncheon, South Korea
- Military career
- Allegiance: Joseon
- Conflicts: Imjin War; Siege of Busanjin †

Korean name
- Hangul: 정발
- Hanja: 鄭撥
- RR: Jeong Bal
- MR: Chŏng Pal

Art name
- Hangul: 백운
- Hanja: 白雲
- RR: Baekun
- MR: Paegun

Courtesy name
- Hangul: 자고
- Hanja: 子固
- RR: Jago
- MR: Chago

Posthumous name
- Hangul: 충장
- Hanja: 忠壯
- RR: Chungjang
- MR: Ch'ungjang

Navy captain Chŏng Pal (Korean: 정발; Hanja: 鄭撥, 1553–14th day, 4th month of 1592) was a general of the Joseon period who commanded a garrison at Busan port.

== Death ==
He was killed in action in 1592, during the Siege of Busan, while defending the garrison from elements of the Japanese vanguard, led by Sō Yoshitoshi.

Eventually, his entire garrison was overrun and killed by Japanese forces. He was the first high-ranking officer to be killed in combat during the Japanese invasions of Korea (1592–1598).

Some Korean accounts of the war say that Chŏng fled the battle rather than fight, but the accepted version is that he stayed and died fighting the invaders. Nanjungjaprok contains the witness reports of survivors of the Siege of Busan, in which the survivors claimed that Chŏng stood his ground instead of running. There is a statue of him defending the city in the centre of Busan.

He was enshrined in the Chungnyeolsa (Busan) in 1624.
