= Dongnaeeupseong =

Goryeo-era fortress in Busan, South Korea

Coordinates: 35.2098°N 129.0920°E

Dongnaeeupseong 東萊邑城 동래읍성
- Dongnae District, Busan, South Korea
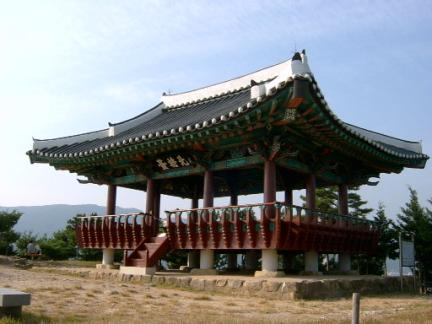
- North gate of the fortress

Site information
- Type: Korean fortress
- Condition: Reconstructed, serves as historic site

Site history
- Battles/wars: Siege of Dongnae

Korean name
- Hangul: 동래읍성
- Hanja: 東萊邑城
- RR: Dongnaeeupseong
- MR: Tongnaeŭpsŏng

Dongnaeeupseong (Korean: 동래읍성; Hanja: 東萊邑城) is a Goryeo-era Korean fortress in Dongnae District, Busan, South Korea. it is located on the mountain Maansan.

The fortress was lived in and used for many centuries, with the exception of around the 17th to mid-18th centuries. It stopped being used in the mid-20th century. Now, it is a popular tourist attraction.

== History ==
There was a fortress in the area at latest during the Goryeo period. Construction work took place in 1387 on the fortress, and continued for over a month. In 1446, during the Joseon period, a stone wall was constructed in the site.

The fortress was the site of the Siege of Dongnae during the 1592–1598 Japanese invasions of Korea. After which, the fortress was destroyed and left neglected for centuries. In 1731, the fortress was rebuilt and a town was put inside. 52,003 people were mobilized for the construction work. Beginning in 1870, work was done to rebuild the main wall and a number of turrets, in anticipation of a potential Japanese invasion.

The fortress was partially demolished during the 1910–1945 Japanese colonial period. The walls between the west to south gate were torn down.

=== Restoration ===
The Busan Metropolitan Government began restoration work on the fortress in 1979. From then until 2022, more than 20 archaeological investigations were conducted at the fortress. These investigations confirmed what facilities existed in the fortress, as well as their nature. Relics and even human remains from the Japanese invasions have been discovered; some of these discoveries are displayed at Suan station on Busan Metro Line 4.

In recent years, a Dongnaeeupseong History Festival has been held at the fortress, featuring history-related programs, traditional games and performances.

== Description ==
The fortress is roughly shaped like an oval and has six gates. The north and east are surrounded by mountains, and the south and west are in more open areas. The south gate is considered the fortress's main gate. Each gate has a gate tower, with several of them having been restored in recent years. The fortress has inner and outer walls. The fortress has 2.7 km (1.7 mi) of walls; of this, 1.3 km (0.81 mi) were destroyed due to urbanization. The walls are around 1.5 to 3.0 m (4.9 to 9.8 ft) in height and 2.4 m (7.9 ft) thick at the top. The base of the walls are composed of small stones and sandy clay.

Much of the fortress's walls were lost. The foundations remained, however, which allowed the fortress's to be reconstructed in its original shape.

The fortress now lies close to a residential area, and is an attraction for both locals and tourists. At night, lights are lit for people to walk around the trail.
