= Park Byeongseon =

South Korean historian (1927–2011)

- Born: 1927
- Died: November 23, 2011 (aged 83–84); Paris, France
- Resting place: Seoul National Cemetery
- Occupations: Librarian, historian

Park Byeongseon (Korean: 박병선; 1927 – 23 November 2011) was a South Korean librarian and historian.

Park studied history education at Seoul National University, graduating in 1950. In 1955, she moved to France to study Korean antiquities. Park pursued her doctorate at Paris Diderot University and became a lecturer at the Paris University. In 1967 she was employed as a special researcher at the Bibliothèque nationale de France, where she discovered in 1972 the second volume of JikjiSimcheYojeol, the world's oldest extant book, printed with movable metal type, while sorting out Korean-related materials at the library.

The book was displayed in 1972 at a Special Exhibition for 'Book' at the International Book Year Book Fair in Paris, where experts recognised its significance and historic value.

The book's existence became publicly known in 1901, when Maurice Courant, a specialist in East Asian Studies, published Supplement to Korean Bibliography (Supplement a la Biblioqraphie Coreenne).

In 1900 the existence of JikjiSimcheYojeol was firstly introduced to the world by Victor Collin de Plancy, but it was not widely showed. 'Jikji' was re-emerged by Park Byeongseon. She proved that it was printed 78 years earlier than the Gutenberg Bible, which was printed in 1455.

In 1975 she discovered the Owegujanggak, a collection of royal protocols of the Joseon dynasty, which had been seized as part of a punitive expedition by the French against Korea in 1866. Park publicly advocated for their return to the Republic of Korea, which resulted in 75 volumes of the Owegujanggak being returned on a renewable lease in April 2011, following an agreement in March between the national museums of France and the Republic of Korea. She retired from the Bibliothèque nationale de France in 1982 but continued to research and advocate for the return of these documents.

Park died on 23 November 2011 at a Paris hospital, where she was receiving treatment for colon cancer, her remains were later interred at the Seoul National Cemetery, in honour of her contributions to the nation.
