= Eunhaesa =

Buddhist temple

Eunhae Temple
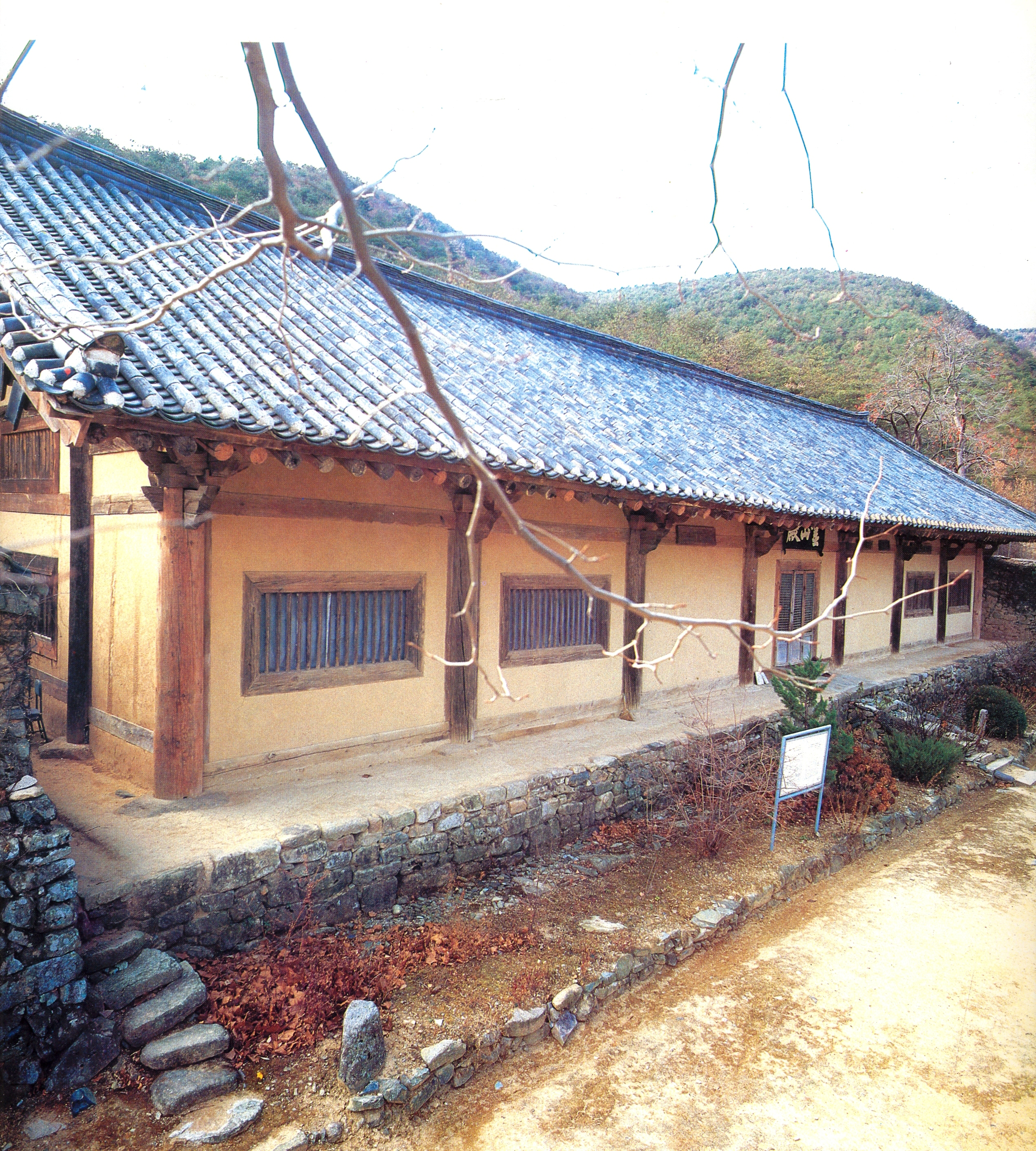
- Yeongsanjeon Hall of Geojoam Hermitage, National Treasure 14.

- Location within South Korea

Religion
- Affiliation: Buddhism

Location
- Location: Chiil-ri, Cheongtong-myeon, Yeongcheon, North Gyeongsang Province
- Country: South Korea
- Coordinates: 35.9920634°N 128.7896335°E

Website
- eunhae-sa.org

Korean name
- Hangul: 은해사
- Hanja: 銀海寺
- RR: Eunhaesa
- MR: Ŭnhaesa

Eunhaesa is a head temple of the Jogye Order of Korean Buddhism. It is located in Cheongtong-myeon, Yeongcheon, in the province of North Gyeongsang Province, South Korea. It stands on the eastern slopes of Palgongsan, not far from another major temple, Donghwasa. The temple was founded by National Preceptor Hyecheol in 809. The name means "temple of the silver sea." The original name was "temple of the tranquil sea," Haeansa. After the original temple burned to the ground following the Seven Year War in the 1590s, it was moved to its current location and named Eunhaesa.

== See also ==
- Korean Buddhist temples
- Korean Buddhism
- Korean architecture
- Palgongsan
