= Jikji =

Oldest extant book made by metal movable type

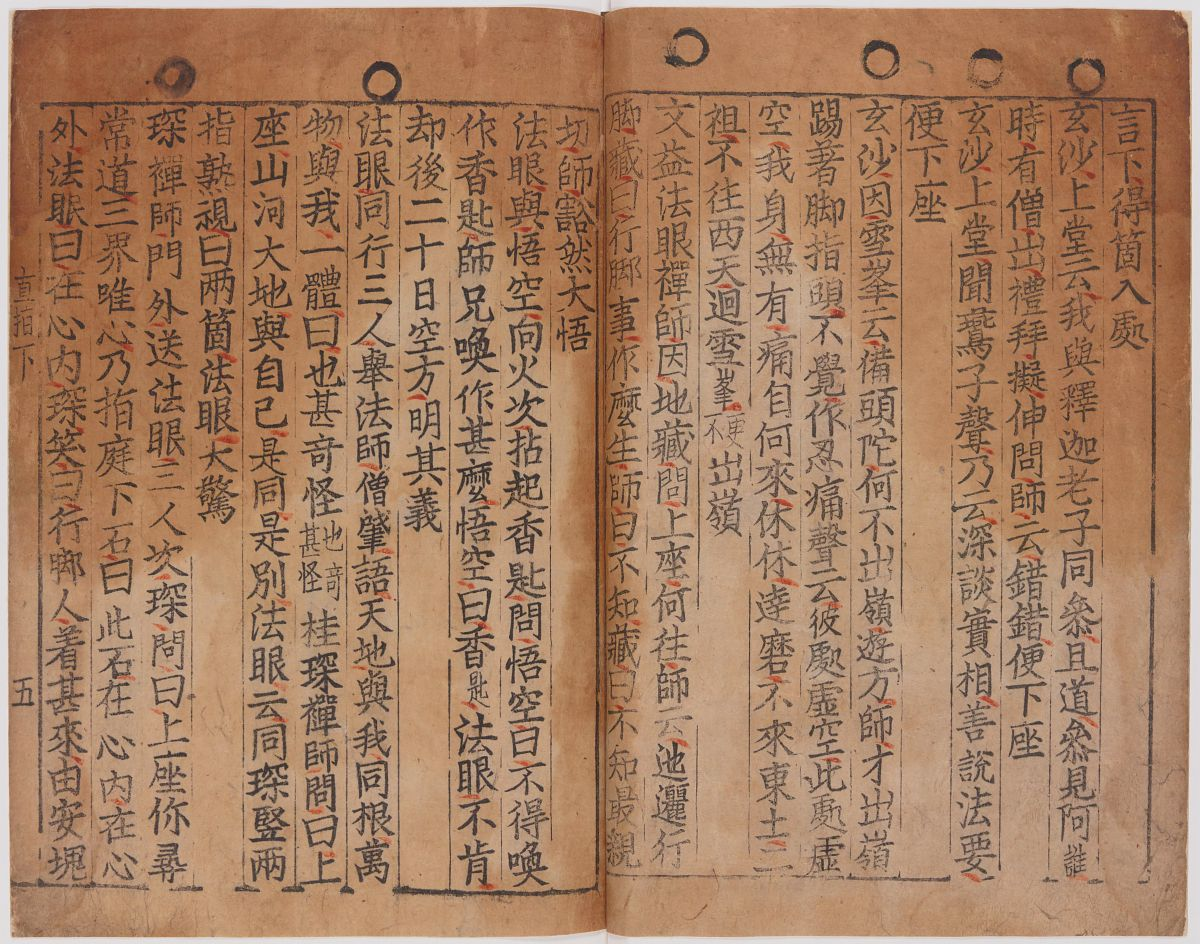
- Pages from the first book printed using type

Korean name
- Hangul: 백운화상초록불조직지심체요절
- Hanja: 白雲和尙抄錄佛祖直指心體要節
- Revised Romanization: Baegun hwasang chorok buljo jikji simche yojeol
- McCune–Reischauer: Paegun hwasang ch'orok pulcho chikchi simch'e yojŏl

Jikji (Korean: 직지심체요절) is the abbreviated title of a Korean Buddhist document whose title translates as "Anthology of Great Buddhist Priests' Zen Teachings". Printed during the Goryeo Dynasty in 1377, it is the world's oldest extant book printed with movable metal type. UNESCO confirmed Jikji as the world's oldest book printed with movable metal type in September 2001 and inscribed it on the Memory of the World Register.

Jikji was published in Heungdeok Temple in 1377 in 2 volumes, 78 years before Johannes Gutenberg's acclaimed "42-Line Bible" was printed between 1452 and 1455. Of the original metal printing, only the second volume survives and is kept at the Manuscrits Orientaux division of the National Library of France (BnF). The BnF hosts a digital copy online. Woodblock prints of Jikji were made later in 1378, and both volumes survive as a woodblock printing. 3 woodblock printings remain, in varying degrees of completeness.

The title is derived from the phrase "Jikji Insim Gyeonseong Seongbul" (直指人心 見性成佛), meaning "When you see a person’s heart correctly through meditation, you realize that the nature of the heart is the mind of Buddha."

== Authorship ==
Jikji was written by the Buddhist monk Baegun (1298–1374), Buddhist name Gyeonghan.

In May 1351, Baegun sought the teachings of the Chinese Buddhist Master Seok-ok. After receiving the first volume of Bulgyeongjisimcheyojeol from Seok-ok, he began practicing Buddhist teachings. Baegun was also taught by the Indian high priest Jigonghwasang.

He later served as the chief priest of Anguksa and Shingwangsa temples in Haeju, Hwanghae Province, and the book was published in two volumes in Seongbulsan in 1372.

Baegun wrote and edited Jikji at Chwiamsa Temple in Yeoju in 1374, where he lived until his death.

== Contents ==
The Jikji comprises a collection of excerpts from the analects of the most revered Buddhist monks throughout successive generations. Baegun compiled it as a guide for students of Buddhism, then Korea's national religion under the Goryeo Dynasty (918–1392).

The text propounds the essentials of Korean Seon, the predecessor of Japan's Zen Buddhism.

The Jikji consists of two volumes. The metal-printed edition published in Heungdeok Temple is kept in the Manuscrits Orientaux division of the National Library of France, with the first page of the last volume (Book 1 in Chapter 38) torn off. A woodblock print of Jikji published in Chwiamsa Temple contains the complete two volumes. This is kept in the National Library of Korea, Jangsagak, and Bulgap temples and in the Academy of Korean Studies.

== Printing ==
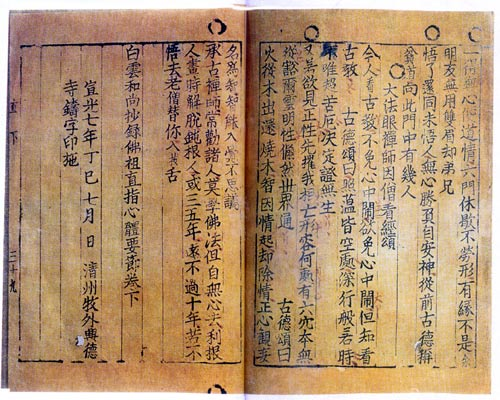
Jikji, Selected Teachings of Buddhist Sages and Seon Masters, the earliest known book printed with movable metal type, 1377. Bibliothèque Nationale de France, Paris.

On the last page of Jikji, details of its publication are recorded, indicating that it was published in the third year of King U (July 1377) by metal type at Heungdeok Temple in Cheongju. The Jikji originally consisted of two volumes totaling 307 chapters, but the first volume of the metal-printed version is no longer extant.

A record indicates that in 1377, Baegun's students, priests Seoksan and Daldam, helped publish Jikji by using movable metal type, and the priestess Myodeok also contributed her efforts.

Although made using movable type, Jikji used printing methods different from those of Johannes Gutenberg.

The surviving metal type's dimensions are 24.6 × 17.0 cm (9.7 × 6.7 in). Its paper is very thin and white. The whole text is double-folded. The cover appears to have been remade. The title of Jikji also seems to be written in India ink after the original. In French, the cover on the surviving volume of the metal type edition records, "The oldest known Korean book printed with molded type, with 1377 as date", written by Maurice Courant.

The lines are not straight but askew. The difference in ink color thickness shown on drawn letter paper is significant, and spots often occur. Even some characters, such as 'day' (日) or 'one' (一), are written in reverse, while other letters are not printed completely. The same typed letters are not shown on the same paper, but the same typed letters appear on other leaves. There are also blurs and spots around the characters.

== Rediscovery ==
The metal-printed Jikji became known to the world in 1901 through its inclusion in the appendix of the Bibliographie coréenne, compiled by the French sinologist and scholar of Korea, Maurice Courant (1865–1935). In 1972, the Jikji was displayed in Paris during the "International Book Year" hosted by the National Library of France, gaining it worldwide attention for the first time. The book was "rediscovered" by Dr. Park Byeongseon, a National Library of France librarian. Park died in 2011.

The Jikji was printed using metal type in Heungdeok Temple outside Cheongju-mok in July 1377, a fact recorded in its postscript. That it was printed in Heungdeok Temple in Uncheon-dong, Cheongju, was confirmed when Cheongju University excavated the Heungdeok Temple site in 1985.

Heungdeok Temple was rebuilt in March 1992. In 1992, the Cheongju Early Printing Museum was opened, and from 2000, it took the Jikji as its central theme.

The Manuscrits Orientaux department of the National Library of France preserves only the final volume of the Jikji.

On 4 September 2001, the Jikji was formally inscribed on UNESCO's Memory of the World Register. The UNESCO/Jikji Memory of the World Prize was created in 2004 to commemorate the creation of the Jikji.

== Restoration ==
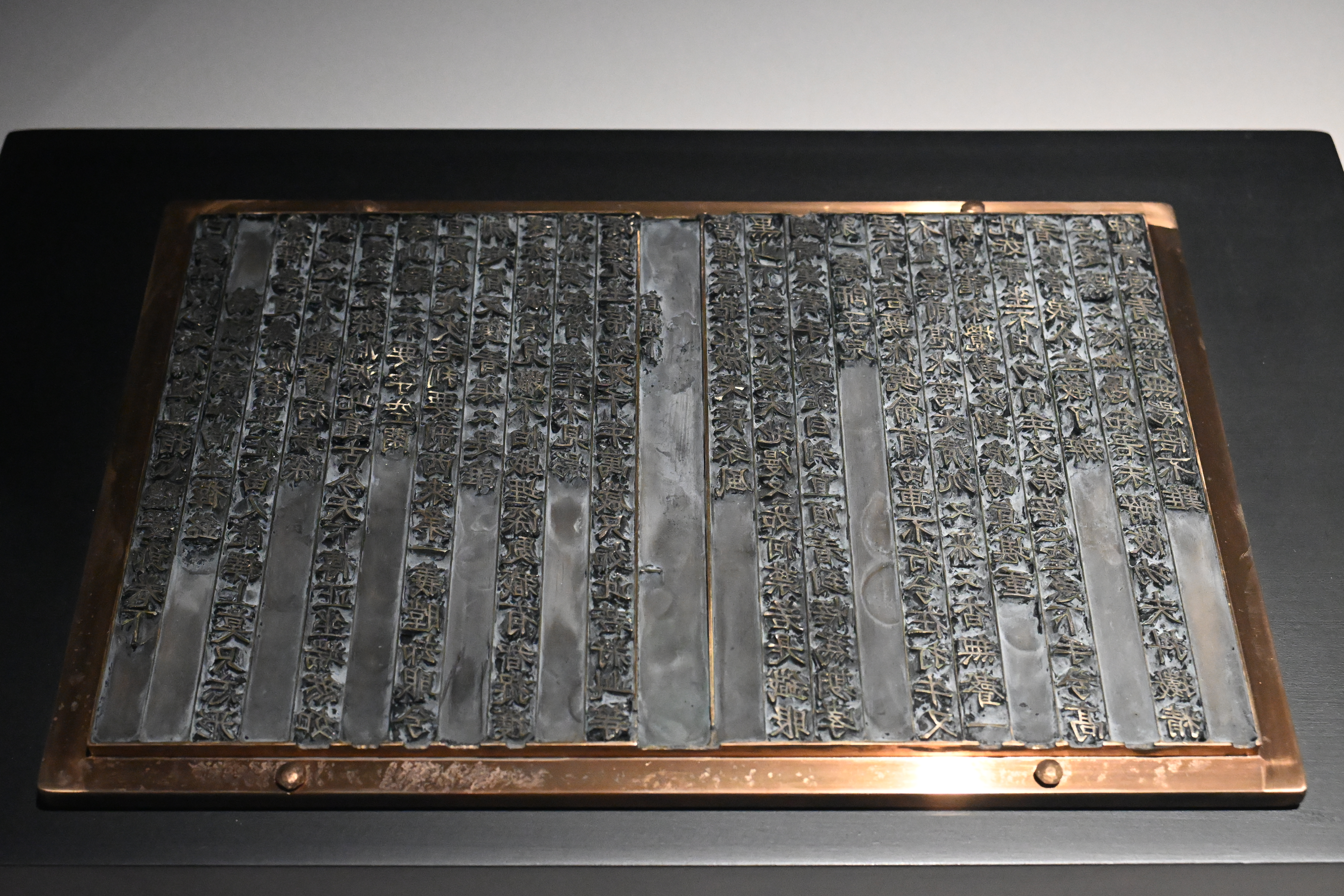
Restored metal print plate

The restoration process of the lower volume of Jikji was completed in 2013, restoring pages 2–14 by January 2012 and pages 15–29 in January 2013. In March 2013, the Cheongju Early Printing Museum commissioned the Humanities Research Institute at Kyungpook National University to research further restoration processes to complete a full restoration of the two volumes of Jikji.

The completed restoration of the Jikji metal movable type was revealed at its Metal Type Casting Training Center. It successfully replicated the 31,200 characters in the upper and lower volumes of Jikji with a total of 78 plates engraved with 400 characters per plate. This restoration work was done by expert Im In-ho, who reproduced the printed type of Jikji using the wax casting method widely used at the time of the original creation of Jikji.

The wax casting method engraves letters by attaching the letters to beeswax that was procured by heating honeycomb. A mold of the letter is then made by wrapping it with soil and pouring molten iron into the spaces where the wax has melted.

Because only one incomplete copy of the metal-type printed Jikji remains, missing information was filled in by referring to the woodblock print version of Jikji, published a year after the metal-type printed version. The new restoration now includes the page of the lower volume that was lost in the copy at the National Library of France. The typeface replicates the type of Jabi Doryang Chambeop Jihae, which is known to have been produced at Heungdeok Temple in Cheongju around the same period. Characters not found in the Jabi Doryang Chambeop Jihae were created by combining strokes as printed in the lower volumes of Jikji.

In total, Cheongju city invested 1.81 billion won (approx. US$1.5 million) on the Goryeo-era metal type restoration project from 2011 to 2016.

== Controversy ==
Towards the end of the Joseon Dynasty, French diplomat Victor Collin de Plancy bought the second volume of the Jikji in Seoul and took it to France, where it is now kept at the National Library of France in Paris.

In May 1886, Korea and France concluded a treaty of defense and commerce, and as a result, in 1887, official diplomatic relations were entered into by the treaty's official ratification by Kim Yunsik (1835–1922) and Victor Collin de Plancy. Plancy, who had majored in law in France and went on to study Chinese, had served for six years as translator at the French Legation in China, between 1877 and 1883. In 1888, he went to Seoul as the first French consul to Korea and stayed there until 1891. During his extended residence in Korea, first as consul and then again as full diplomatic minister from 1896 to 1906, Collin de Plancy collected Korean ceramics and old books. His official secretary, Maurice Courant, who had moved to Seoul, classified them.

Although the channels through which Plancy collected his works are unclear, he seems to have collected them primarily during the early 1900s. Most of the old books Plancy collected in Korea went to the National Library of France at an auction in 1911, while the metal-printed Jikji was purchased in that same year for 180 francs by Henri Véver, a well-known jewel merchant and old book collector, who in turn donated it to the French National Library in his will.

The right of ownership remains disputed, with the National Library of France maintaining that the Jikji should remain in France, while Korean activists argue it should belong to Korea. The National Library of France says that as an important historical artifact of all mankind, the Jikji should remain in France as it represents a common, worldwide heritage, and does not belong to any one country. In addition, they claim the Jikji would be better preserved and displayed in France because of the prestige and resources the Library possesses. On the other hand, Korean organizations claim that it should belong to its country of origin and carry historical significance for the Korean people. The Committee to Bring Jikji Back to Korea, led by American Richard Pennington, is one such organization in Seoul, South Korea, working to repatriate the Jikji back to Korea from France. The French President François Mitterrand promised to investigate ways to return various Korean books, including the Jikji, should the French TGV high-speed rail technology be exported to Korea. From April to June 2011, 297 volumes with 191 different Uigwe of the Kyujanggak (Oegyujanggak), were shipped back in four separate installments and subsequently kept at the National Museum of Korea. However, Jikji was not included, following opposition in France, including a protest lodged by the librarians at the National Library.

== See also ==
- History of typography in East Asia
- History of Korea
- Diamond Sutra – earliest dated example of block printing
- Woodblock printing in Korea
