= Geumho =

Geumho, Kumho, or Kǔmho (Korean: 금호) may refer to:

- Kumho (South Hamgyong), North Korea
- Geumho River, Gyeongsangbuk-do, South Korea
- Geumho-eup, a town in Yeongcheon, North Gyeongsang, South Korea
- Geumho-dong, Seungdong-gu, Seoul, South Korea
- Geumho Station, Seoul Metro station in Geumho-dong, Seungdong-gu, Seoul, South Korea

== Companies ==
- Kumho Asiana Group, a South Korean conglomerate
- Kumho Petrochemical and subsidiaries, a South Korean conglomerate spun off from the Kumho Asiana Group
- Kumho Tire, a South Korean tire manufacturer separated from Kumho Asiana Group after it was sold to Double Star in 2018
