= Cheongju =

City in North Chungcheong Province, South Korea

- Specific city
- Panoramic view of Cheongju

- Flag Emblem

- Location in South Korea
- Coordinates: 36°38′N 127°29′E
- Country: South Korea
- Region: Hoseo
- First mention: 940
- Founded: 1946
- Administrative divisions: 4 gu, 30 legal dong, 3 eup, 10 myeon

Government
  - mayor: Lee Jang-seop (이장섭)

Area
  - Total: 940.3 km^{2} (363.1 sq mi)
- Elevation: 39 m (128 ft)

Population (February 2026)
  - Total: 852,147
  - Density: 906.3/km^{2} (2,347/sq mi)
  - Dialect: Chungcheong
- Time zone: UTC+09:00 (KST)
- Postal code: 28100~28899
- Area code: (+82) 43-2xx
- Website: cheongju.go.kr/english/index.do

Korean name
- Hangul: 청주시
- Hanja: 淸州市
- RR: Cheongju-si
- MR: Ch'ŏngju-si

Cheongju (Korean: 청주; Korean pronunciation: [tɕʰʌŋ.dʑu]) is the capital and largest city of North Chungcheong Province in South Korea. The "Cheong" in the name of the province is the same as in Cheongju.

== History ==
Cheongju has been an important provincial town since ancient times. In the Cheongju Mountains, particularly in the area where Sangdang Sanseong is located, ruins dating from the Old Stone Age to the Bronze Age have been discovered. Settlements associated with the Paleolithic Age have also been found in Cheongju, such as the Durubong Cave Site.

After the unification of the Three Kingdoms by Silla in 676, various parts of Korea, including Cheongju, began to adopt Buddhism. This was influenced by the Silla culture's connection with the Silk Road, which facilitated the spread of Buddhism from Nepal across Northern China to the Korean peninsula. During the Goryeo era, particularly during the reign of Gwangjong, several monuments related to Buddhism were created. Among them is Cheoldanggan, built in the year 962 in the center of the city near the remains of Yongdu Temple. Cheoldanggan is a flagpole used to hang the Dang flag, which is raised to pay tribute to Buddha. It was listed as a National Treasure in 1962 by the South Korean government. In the Joseon period, the Cheongju region began to adopt Confucianism as its main religion.

Throughout the history of Cheongju, various temples were established during different periods in the history of the Korean peninsula. Examples include the Buddhist Yonghwasa Temple, dating back to the Goryeo period, and the Bulguksa Temple, established in the 8th century during the Silla period. Cheongju temples were also significant in the advancement of Korean printing, including book printing. One of the important documents printed in Cheongju was done so at Heungdeok Temple during Goryeo, specifically in the year 1377.

One of the first schools established in North Chungcheong Province was founded in Cheongju during 1896. During the Baekje period, several tombs were built around the city, in addition to Joseon forts such as Sangdangsanseong, which served to connect the northern and southern provinces after the Japanese invasion of 1592.

In 1593, the Battle of Cheongju took place between Japanese forces and Joseon that then ruled the Korean peninsula during Hideyoshi's Invasions of Korea, in which more than 8,000 Korean warrior monks participated.

The government of the province relocated here from Chungju in 1908. In 1914, Cheongju County and Munui County, which was originally called Yeonsan (연산; 燕山) during the Silla era, were merged by the Japanese colonial government. The opening of the Chungbuk-line in 1926 sparked regional development. In 1946, Cheongju and Cheongwon County were separated, and in 1949, Cheongju was made a city. Afterwards, it went through the separation of administrative dong and their transfer to Cheongwon-gun, with two branch offices (East and West) established in July 1989 that were upgraded to Sangdang District and Heungdeok District in January.

Cheongju experienced one of the largest population growths in Korea, having almost quadrupled its population from 147,000 in 1970 to 582,158 in 2000.

== Geography ==
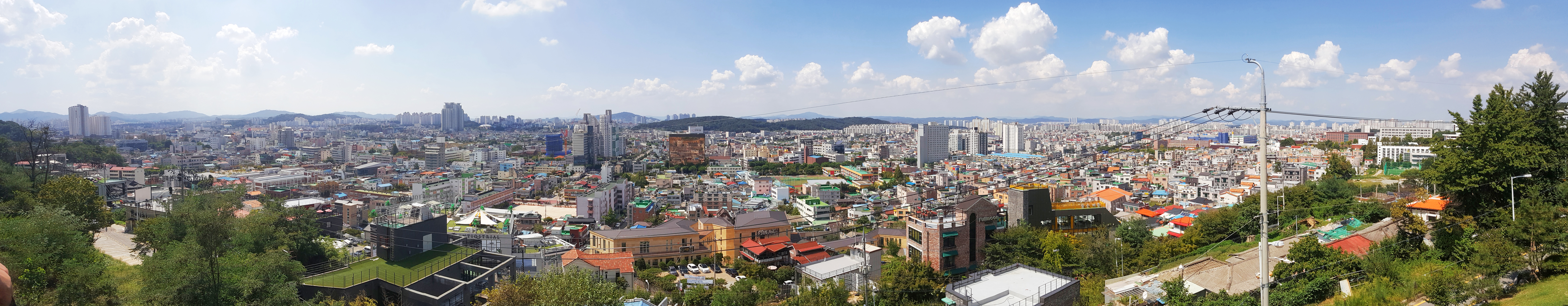
Cityscape of Cheongju

Geum River goes through the center of Cheongju. Additionally, the tributaries of Musim and Miho flow together in the northern part of the city. To the east and west, there are the mountains of Wuam and Bumo. Musimcheon River also goes through the middle of Cheongju.

=== Climate ===
Cheongju is a temperate zone, so there are four seasons. The climate is a humid continental climate (Köppen: Dwa), but can be considered a borderline humid subtropical climate (Köppen: Cwa) using the −3 °C (27 °F) isotherm.

Climate data for Cheongju (1991–2020 normals, extremes 1967–present)
Month	Jan	Feb	Mar	Apr	May	Jun	Jul	Aug	Sep	Oct	Nov	Dec	Year
Record high °C (°F)	15.6 (60.1)	22.1 (71.8)	28.2 (82.8)	31.3 (88.3)	34.5 (94.1)	36.3 (97.3)	37.8 (100.0)	39.1 (102.4)	34.7 (94.5)	30.6 (87.1)	25.1 (77.2)	19.3 (66.7)	39.1 (102.4)
Mean daily maximum °C (°F)	3.4 (38.1)	6.4 (43.5)	12.5 (54.5)	19.6 (67.3)	24.8 (76.6)	28.2 (82.8)	30.0 (86.0)	30.6 (87.1)	26.4 (79.5)	20.7 (69.3)	13.0 (55.4)	5.4 (41.7)	18.4 (65.1)
Daily mean °C (°F)	−1.5 (29.3)	1.0 (33.8)	6.5 (43.7)	13.0 (55.4)	18.7 (65.7)	23.0 (73.4)	25.8 (78.4)	26.2 (79.2)	21.3 (70.3)	14.6 (58.3)	7.5 (45.5)	0.6 (33.1)	13.1 (55.6)
Mean daily minimum °C (°F)	−5.8 (21.6)	−3.8 (25.2)	1.0 (33.8)	7.0 (44.6)	13.1 (55.6)	18.4 (65.1)	22.4 (72.3)	22.6 (72.7)	17.0 (62.6)	9.4 (48.9)	2.6 (36.7)	−3.7 (25.3)	8.4 (47.1)
Record low °C (°F)	−24.1 (−11.4)	−26.4 (−15.5)	−12.5 (9.5)	−4.8 (23.4)	2.8 (37.0)	7.9 (46.2)	12.3 (54.1)	12.7 (54.9)	3.7 (38.7)	−4.3 (24.3)	−11.0 (12.2)	−20.6 (−5.1)	−26.4 (−15.5)
Average precipitation mm (inches)	20.6 (0.81)	29.0 (1.14)	42.9 (1.69)	75.5 (2.97)	82.8 (3.26)	140.0 (5.51)	293.8 (11.57)	274.2 (10.80)	142.3 (5.60)	58.0 (2.28)	46.6 (1.83)	26.7 (1.05)	1,232.4 (48.52)
Average precipitation days (≥ 0.1 mm)	7.2	6.4	7.8	8.3	8.1	9.4	15.7	14.0	8.7	6.1	8.7	8.8	109.2
Average snowy days	9.1	5.5	2.8	0.3	0.0	0.0	0.0	0.0	0.0	0.1	2.2	8.5	28.5
Average relative humidity (%)	63.5	58.6	55.6	53.4	57.7	64.5	74.2	73.1	70.6	66.8	65.6	64.9	64.0
Mean monthly sunshine hours	166.9	176.9	207.6	220.0	238.8	196.5	150.1	173.1	176.4	204.1	160.6	161.0	2,232
Percentage possible sunshine	53.1	55.9	54.0	56.6	53.5	44.6	34.3	42.5	47.6	57.3	51.5	52.4	49.7
Source: Korea Meteorological Administration (percent sunshine 1981–2010)

== Administrative districts ==
From 1 July 2014, Cheongju and Cheongwon County unified, and administrative districts were changed to the following:

- Heungdeok District (흥덕구; 興德區) West

Osong-eup, Gangnae-myeon, Oksan-myeon, Uncheon-dong, Sinbong-dong, Bokdae1-dong, Bokdae2-dong, Gakyeong-dong, Bongmyeong1-dong, Bongmyeong2-dong, Songjeong-dong, Gangseo1-dong, Gangseo2-dong, Ochang-eup

- Seowon District (서원구; 西原區) South

Nami-myeon, Hyeondo-myeon, Sajik1-dong, Sajik2-dong, Sachang-dong, Mochooung-dong, Sugok1-dong, Sugok2-dong, Sannam-dong, Bunpyeong-dong, Seonghwa-dong, Geasin-dong, Jookrim-dong

- Sangdang District (상당구; 上黨區) East

Nangseong-myeon, Miwon-myeon, Gaduk-myeon, Namil-myeon, Mooni-myeon, Joongang-dong, Seongan-dong, Top-dong, Deasung-dong, Yeongun-dong, Geumcheon-dong, Yongam-dong, Myeongam-dong, Sinsung-dong, Yongam1-dong, Yongam2-dong, Bangseo-dong

- Cheongwon District (청원구; 淸原區) North

Nesoo-eup, Buki-myeon, Wooam-dong, Neduk1-dong, Neduk2-dong, Yoolang-dong, Sacheon-dong, Ogeunjang-dong, Ochang-eup

== Government and infrastructure ==
The headquarters of the Korea Disease Control and Prevention Agency, and the Ministry of Food and Drug Safety are located in the Osong Health Technology Administration Complex.

== Cultural properties ==
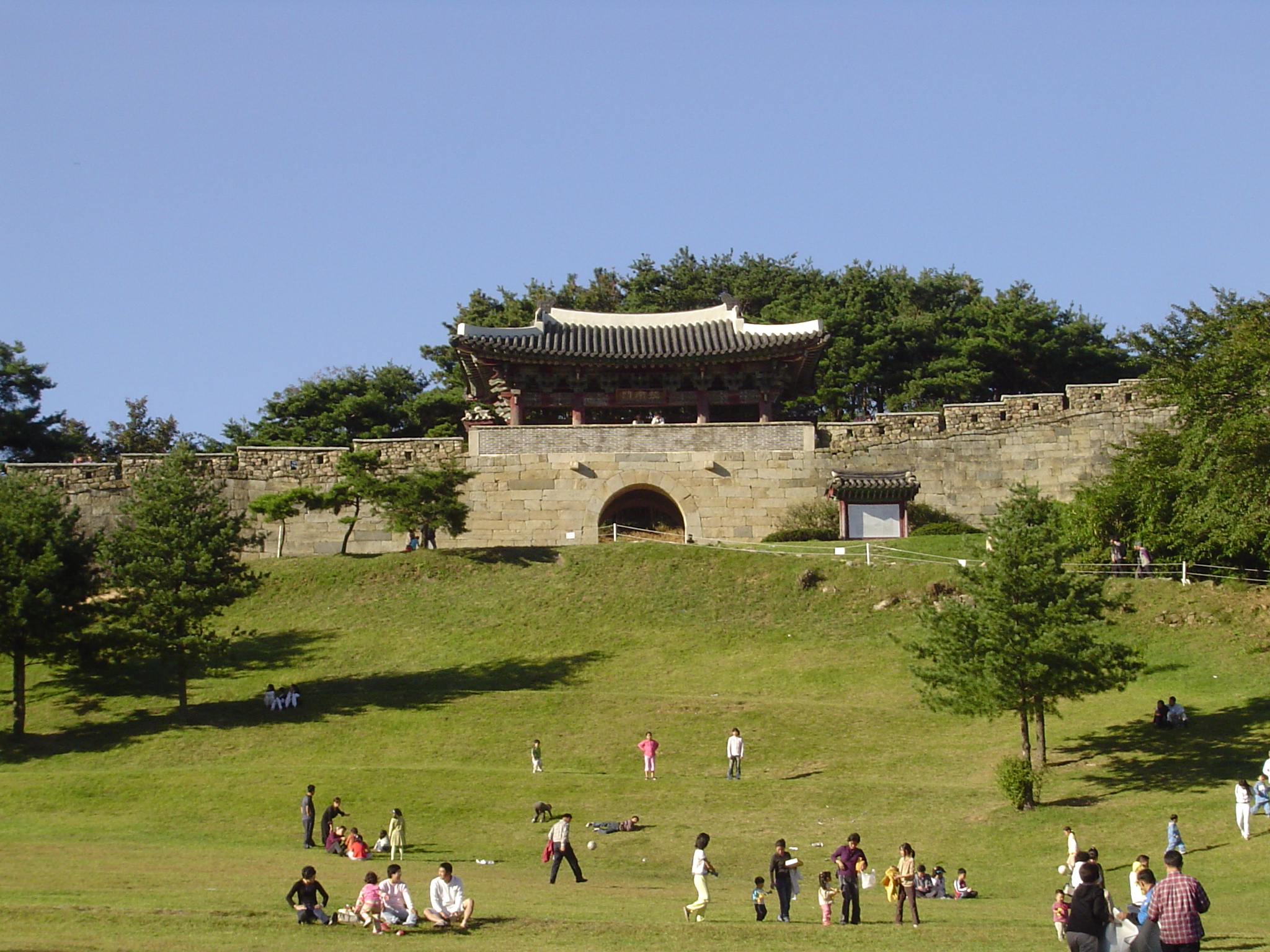
A front view of Sangdang Fortress

- Sangdangsanseong (Sangdang Mountain Fortress) lies on the slopes of Mt. Uam within the city limits. The fortress is mainly a 3-to-4-metre-tall (9.8–13.1-foot) wall that stretches over 4.2 kilometres (2.6 miles) in circumference. The present walls date to the 1716 restoration of the site. Within the walls lies a small tourist village that has several restaurants. It is maintained as a historical site open to visitors.
- Cheongju National Museum also lies near Mt. Uam, and houses several exhibits of cultural artifacts from the nearby area. It serves as a major repository of regional historical artifacts.
- Heungdeoksa Temple Site is the home to the Early Printing Museum, and is to be the site of the printing of Jikji, the oldest existent book printed using movable metal type. The museum itself contains exhibits related to the art of printing through the ages.
- Yongdusaji Cheoldanggan (The Iron Flagpole of the Yongdu Temple Site) is designated Korean National Treasure number 41, and is located near Lotte Department Store in downtown Cheongju. Made of twenty iron cylinders, the flagpole stands 13.1 metres (43.0 feet) tall, and was formerly used to hang flags to honour the Buddha. It remains one of the few surviving iron flagpoles from the Goryeo period.
- National Museum of Modern and Contemporary Art – Cheongju (MMCA Cheongju) which is scheduled to open in December 2018, will be the first museum in Korea to open its conservation center to the general public. Notably, MMCA Cheongju is being constructed within a renovated tobacco factory, which once played a major role in Korea's modern industry. The new building has been especially designed to use energy more efficiently and thus reduce greenhouse gas emissions. As such, the new museum will be a high-profile example of a project combining elements of urban revitalization and historical preservation.
- Chojeonghaenggung (Chojeong Temporary Palace) is a temporary palace where King Sejong stayed for treatment of an eye disease. It is said that King Sejong completed the creation of Hangul here. This place was destroyed during the Joseon Dynasty, and restoration work began in December 2017, and construction was completed in December 2019. It opened in June 2020. Also, Chojeong Mineral Water produced near here is quite famous carbonated water. It is known that King Sejong also tried to treat an eye disease with carbonated water produced in Chojeong. Chojeonghaenggung is located in Naesu-eup, Cheongwon District. It is now operated as a historical site and cultural attraction open to the public.
- Cheongnamdae is a former presidential villa located near Daecheong Lake in Cheongju. Built in 1983, it served as a private retreat for South Korean presidents for about two decades. The site was opened to the public in 2003 and has since become a popular tourist destination. The complex includes walking trails, gardens, and exhibition halls displaying materials related to the history of the Korean presidency. The site also serves as a recreational space for visitors.
- Cheongju Early Printing Museum is located at the Heungdeoksa Temple Site in Cheongju. The museum is dedicated to the history of printing and highlights the significance of Jikji, the world's oldest extant book printed with movable metal type. It displays various exhibits related to the development of printing technology and Korean printing heritage.

== Transport ==
Cheongju International Airport provides scheduled flights within Korea and to other parts of Asia. The main train station is located at Ogeunjang approximately 8 km (5.0 mi) north of the city hall. This station is on the Chungbuk Line. Cheongju Bus Terminal provides almost all of the bus lines to bus terminals located in other cities. Ticketing time is between 4:00 am and 11:40 pm. Cheongju Express Bus Terminal provides some bus lines for Seoul (Gangnam, Sangbong, South Seoul, East Seoul, Busan, East Deagu, Gwangju).

In 2023, the Cheongju tunnel flooded during the annual monsoon which trapped 15 vehicles and resulted in at least 7 deaths and 11 reported missing.

In 2025, the express bus terminal was moved. It is located in the basement of 'Connect Hyundai Cheongju'. It is said that the intercity bus terminal will also change soon.

== Education ==
Cheongju is the site of several tertiary institutions, including:

[University]

- Cheongju National University of Education
- Cheongju University
- Chungbuk National University
- Chung Cheong University
- Korea Air Force Academy
- Korea National University of Education
- Seowon University
- Chungbuk Health & Science University
- Catholic Kkotdongnae University
- Chungbuk Provincial University
- Chungbuk Provincial University (Osong Campus)
- Korea Polytechnics IV Cheongju Campus

== Festival ==
The Cheongju International Craft Biennale is usually held in September or October.

There is also the Osong Cosmetic and Beauty Expo.

There is also K-Pet Fair held at Osco in Osong.

== Twin towns – sister cities ==
City	Prefecture/Province/State	Country	Year	Sources
Tottori	Tottori Prefecture	Japan	1991	
Wuhan	Hubei	China	2000	
Bellingham	Washington	United States	2008	
Rostov-on-Don	Rostov oblast	Russia	1999	
Wrocław	Lower Silesian Voivodeship	Poland	2023	

== Notable people from Cheongju ==
- Cho Sung-dal, footballer.
- Choi Eun-sil, basketball player.
- Choi Ji-hyun, short track speed skater.
- Choi Soon-ho, football manager and former professional football player.
- Han Hyo-joo, actress.
- Hwang Eun-bi (known as SinB), singer (Viviz).
- Im Jin-ah (known as Nana), singer, actress and model (After School, Orange Caramel).
- Ji Chang-min (known as Q), singer and dancer (The Boyz).
- Ji Min-hyuk, actor.
- Jun Hyo-seong, singer and actress (Secret).
- Kim Hyeon-oh, footballer
- Kim Ji-woo (known as Chuu), singer (Loona).
- Kim Jung-eun (known as Kim Lip), singer-songwriter (Loona).
- Kim Joo-young (known as Jooyoung), singer-songwriter.
- Kim So-yeon (known as Kassy), singer and rapper.
- C. S. Lee, actor and comedian.
- Lee Jin-wook, actor.
- Lee Na-eun, singer and actress (April).
- Lee Seung-hee, ceramic artist.
- Lee Yi-kyung, actor.
- Moonbin, singer (Astro).
- Moon Sua, singer (Billlie).
- Moon Sang Min, actor.
- Na Young-seok, television producer.
- Park Cho-rong, singer-songwriter, actress (Apink).
- Shin Dong-woo (known as CNU), singer-songwriter, rapper and actor (B1A4).
- Yoon Dae-woong (known as Bigman), beatboxer, singer-songwriter and composer.
- Bae Ho-young (known as Hoyoung), singer and rapper (Verivery).
- Wonstein, rapper and singer.
- Yoo Hae-jin, actor.
- Lee Si-young, actress.
- Kim Kang-hoon, child actor.
- Yoyomi, trot singer.
