= List of ambassadors of France to South Korea =

Ambassador of the French Republic to the Republic of Korea
- Ambassadeur de la République française auprès de la République de Corée
- Arms of the French Republic
- Incumbent; Philippe Bertoux since July 19, 2023
- Style: His Excellency
- Nominator: Minister of Europe and Foreign Affairs
- Appointer: President of France with Council of Ministers meeting
- Term length: 3-4 years
- Inaugural holder: Henri Costilhes
- Formation: November 9, 1887 (Note: Under the Joseon and Korean Empire periods.); February 15, 1949 (Note: Current iteration)

The list of ambassadors of France to South Korea began after diplomatic relations were established in 1886. The official title of this French diplomat is "Ambassador extraordinary and plenipotentiary of the French Republic to the Republic of Korea" (ambassadrice extraordinaire et plénipotentiaire de la République française auprès de la République de Corée).

Franco-Korean diplomatic relations were initially established during the French Third Republic of French history and during the Joseon period of Korean history.

== List of heads of mission ==
=== Ambassadors of the Third Republic ===
- Victor Collin de Plancy, appointed in 1888
- H. Fradin, in 1892
- Victor Collin de Plancy, 1901.

=== Ambassadors to South Korea (post-Korean division) ===
The updated list is available on the website of the French Embassy in Seoul.

| Ambassador | Begins | Ends | Note |
|---|---|---|---|
| Henri Costilhes | 1949 | 1959 | |
| Roger Chambard | 1959 | 1969 | |
| Frédéric Max | 1969 | 1971 | |
| Pierre Landy | 1971 | 1975 | |
| Rémi Teissier Du Cros | 1975 | 1980 | |
| Bernard Follin | 1980 | 1982 | |
| André Baeyens | 1982 | 1985 | |
| Jean-Bernard Ouvrieu | 1985 | 1987 | |
| Hubert Forquenot de La Fortelle | 1987 | 1991 | |
| Bernard Prague | 1991 | 1993 | |
| Dominique Perreau | 1993 | 1997 | |
| Jean-Paul Réau | 1997 | 2001 | |
| François Descoueyte | 2001 | 2005 | |
| Philippe Thiebaud | 2005 | 2009 | |
| Élisabeth Laurin | 2009 | 2012 | |
| Jérôme Pasquier | 2012 | 2015 | |
| Fabien Penone | 2015 | 2019 | |
| Philippe Lefort | 2019 | 2023 | |
| Philippe Bertoux | 2023 | present | |

== See also ==
- France-Korea Treaty of 1886
- List of diplomatic missions in South Korea
