= Lee Seung-hui =

Lee Seung-hui (Korean: 이승희) may refer to:

- Lee Seung-hee (artist) (born 1963)
- Sung-Hi Lee (born 1970), Korean American actress
- Nikki S. Lee (born 1970), photographer
- Lee Seung-hee (born 1988), footballer
