= Woodblock printing in Korea =

Ancient technique for reproducing images or text in Korea

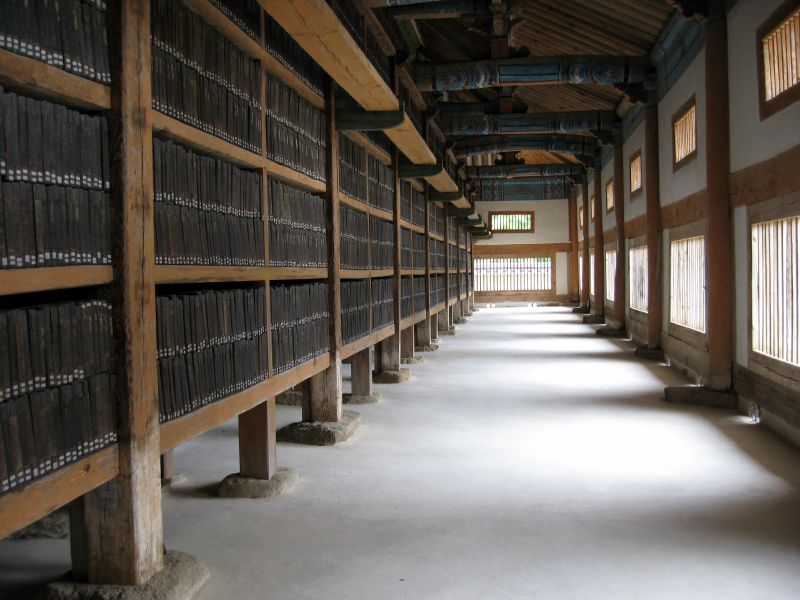
Tripitaka Koreana stored at Haeinsa is one of the foremost Chogye Buddhist temples in South Korea.

Woodblock printing in Korea (목판인쇄) dates back to the 8th century CE, when the oldest known surviving woodblock print was created. That print, The Great Dharani Sutra, is a small Buddhist scroll that was discovered at Bulguksa Temple in Gyeongju, South Korea, in 1966. Scholars have deduced that it was published around 751 under the Silla Dynasty.

Among the other notable works of Korean woodblock printing is the Tripitaka Koreana, an expansive 13th century collection of Buddhist doctrinal texts. The work includes 6,568 books, spanning 81,258 pages, carved into 81,352 printing blocks. The Tripiṭaka was designated a National Treasure of South Korea in 1962, and inscribed in the UNESCO Memory of the World international register in 2007.

In Korea, printing began during the Goryeo Dynasty and greatly developed during the Joseon Dynasty, but woodblock printing continued to flourish until the end of the Joseon Dynasty. This is believed to be because the typesetting of movable type was not strong, so there was a limit to the number of copies that could be printed at the same time.

== History ==
=== Silla ===
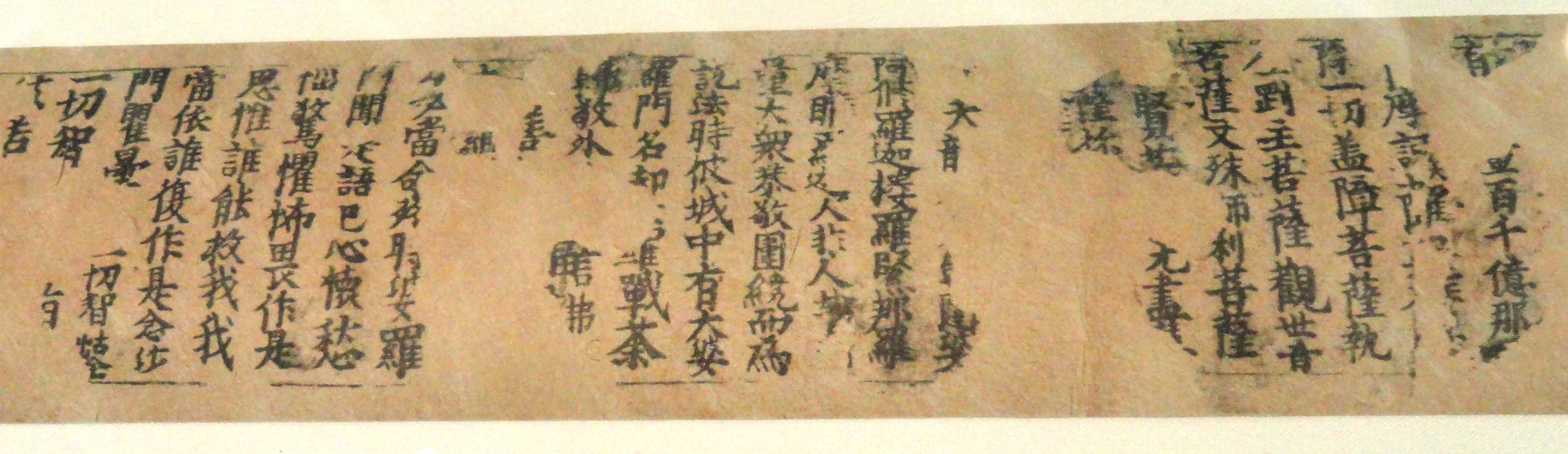
The Great Dharani Sutra is considered one of the oldest printed copies in the world.

Gakja is a Korean word that refers to the technique of engraving letters or images on a board or board. The master of this technique is called individual characters.

Korea's oldest woodcarver is The Great Dharani Sutra (무구정광대다라니경), which was built in the mid-8th century. Gakja is a state-designated national treasure, along with other treasures in the tower. It was made by completely engraving all of the sutra texts, with the letters facing upward, and then placing them on paper and rubbing them with something like a horsehair to create a scroll. The paper material of the book is dak, a traditional Korean paper from Silla.

=== Goryeo ===
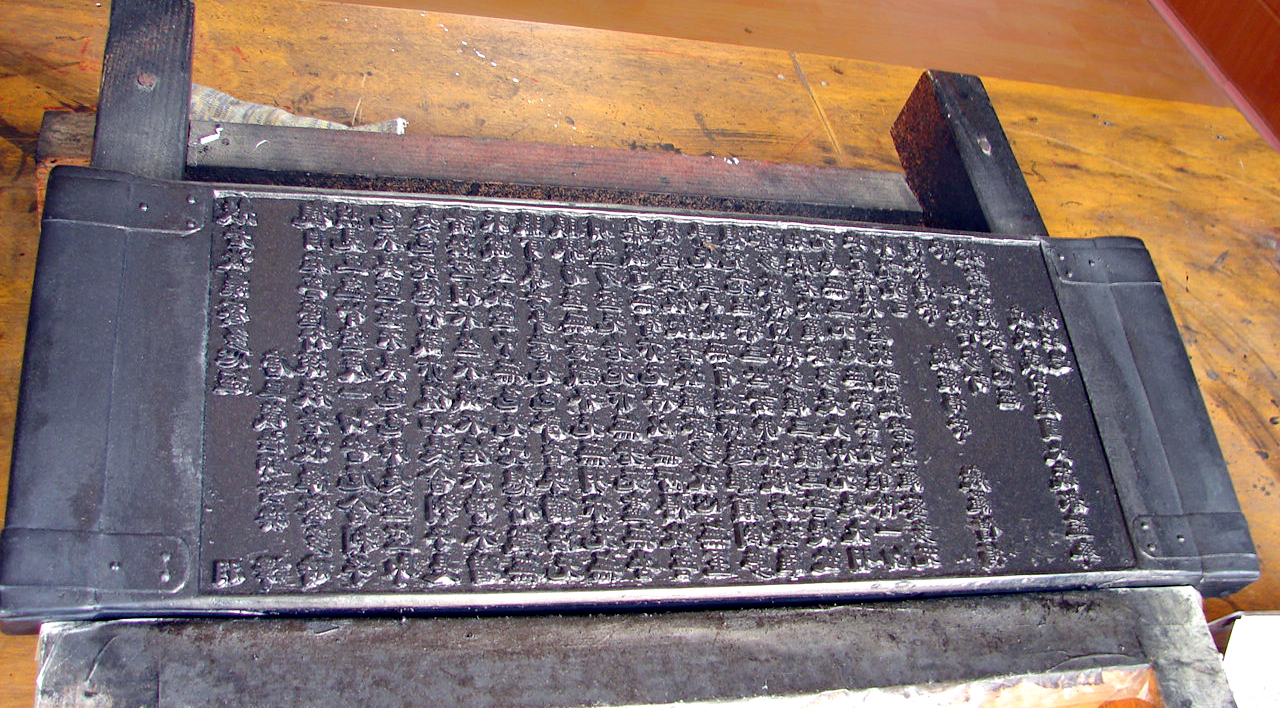
Tripitaka Koreana

During the period of war and conflict, Goryeo recorded Buddhist ideology and culture historically. Along with Buddhism and Confucianism, Hanja have been steadily developed in Korean culture since before the common era. Buddhism, along with indigenous beliefs and Confucianism, became the most established religion among Koreans from an early age. Koreans completed it by printing it on Hanji, a paper made from the inner shell of a mulberry tree. In Korea, printing has enabled the spread of knowledge that was previously exclusive to writers. In 1232, during the Second Mongol Invasion of Korea, a 6,000-volume wooden board of the Tripitaka Koreana, carved in the early 12th century, was burned at the Buinsa in Daegu by nomadic Mongolians. For the tragic cultural and religious loss, the Goryeo people implemented the 15-year project (1236–1251) to carve the Tripitaka Koreana, a set of over 81,000 wooden printing plates.

The Tripitaka Koreana (대장경판) was created by carving Buddhist scriptures onto woodblocks between 1236 and 1251 during the reign of King Gojong. It is stored in Janggyeong Panjeon (장경판전), the oldest building in Haeinsa Temple, and was registered as a Memory of the World Programme in 2007, and Janggyeong Panjeon was registered as a World Cultural Heritage in 1995. The Tripitaka Koreana consists of 52 million characters, each of which was carved in relief on woodblocks. Thanks to meticulous proofreading, there are very few typos or errors in it. It is relatively well preserved despite being made of wood, because scientific principles were applied to prevent damage to the woodblocks and the Janggyeong Panjeon building. The woodblocks were cut down from Prunus sargentii, cherry trees, soaked in seawater for 1–2 years, boiled in salt water, and then dried. It is effective in preventing diseases, pests, cracking, and warping. To prevent the woodblocks from hitting each other, they were lacquered at both ends to increase their durability. The woodblocks of the Tripitaka Koreana are black because of the lacquering.

=== Joseon ===
During the Joseon Dynasty, a large portion of official publications were printed using movable type, but movable type printing had limitations in the number of copies printed, which led to the promotion of woodblock printing.

== See also ==
- List of art techniques
- Korean art
- Woodblock printing
