= Élisabeth Laurin =

French diplomat (born 1952)

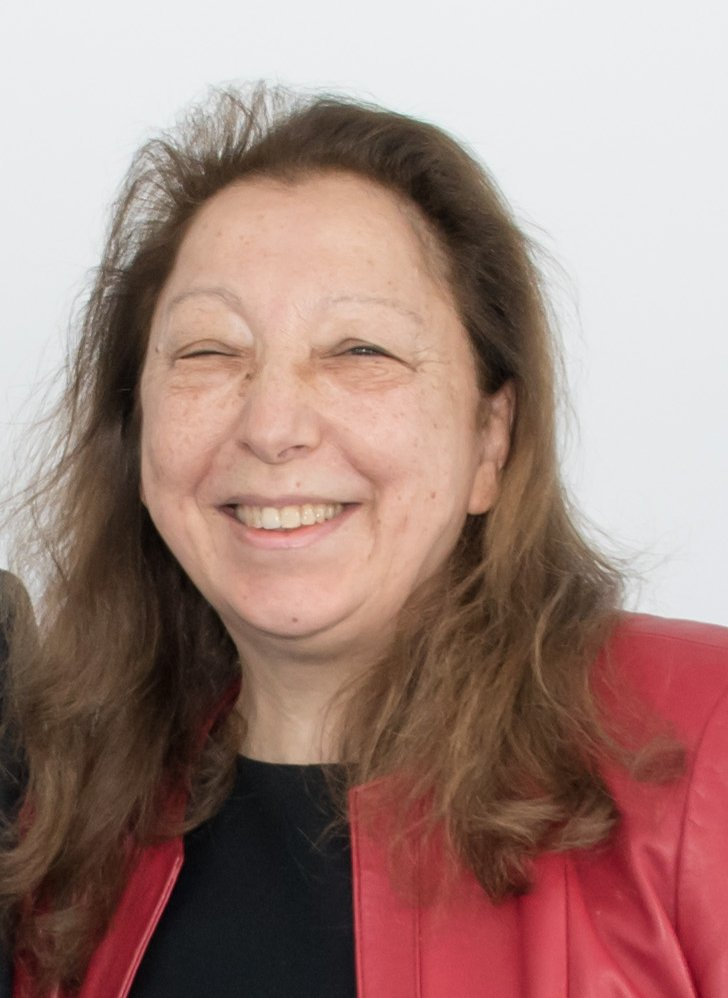
Image of Élisabeth Laurin

Élisabeth Laurin (born 7 December 1952) is a French diplomat who has served as Ambassador to South Korea, the Permanent Mission of France to the United Nations in Geneva, and former director of the French Institute (now French Office in Taipei).

Laurin earned a BA in Oriental Studies (Japanese), MA in Oriental Studies (Chinese) and PhD in Economics.
