= Cheongju Early Printing Museum =

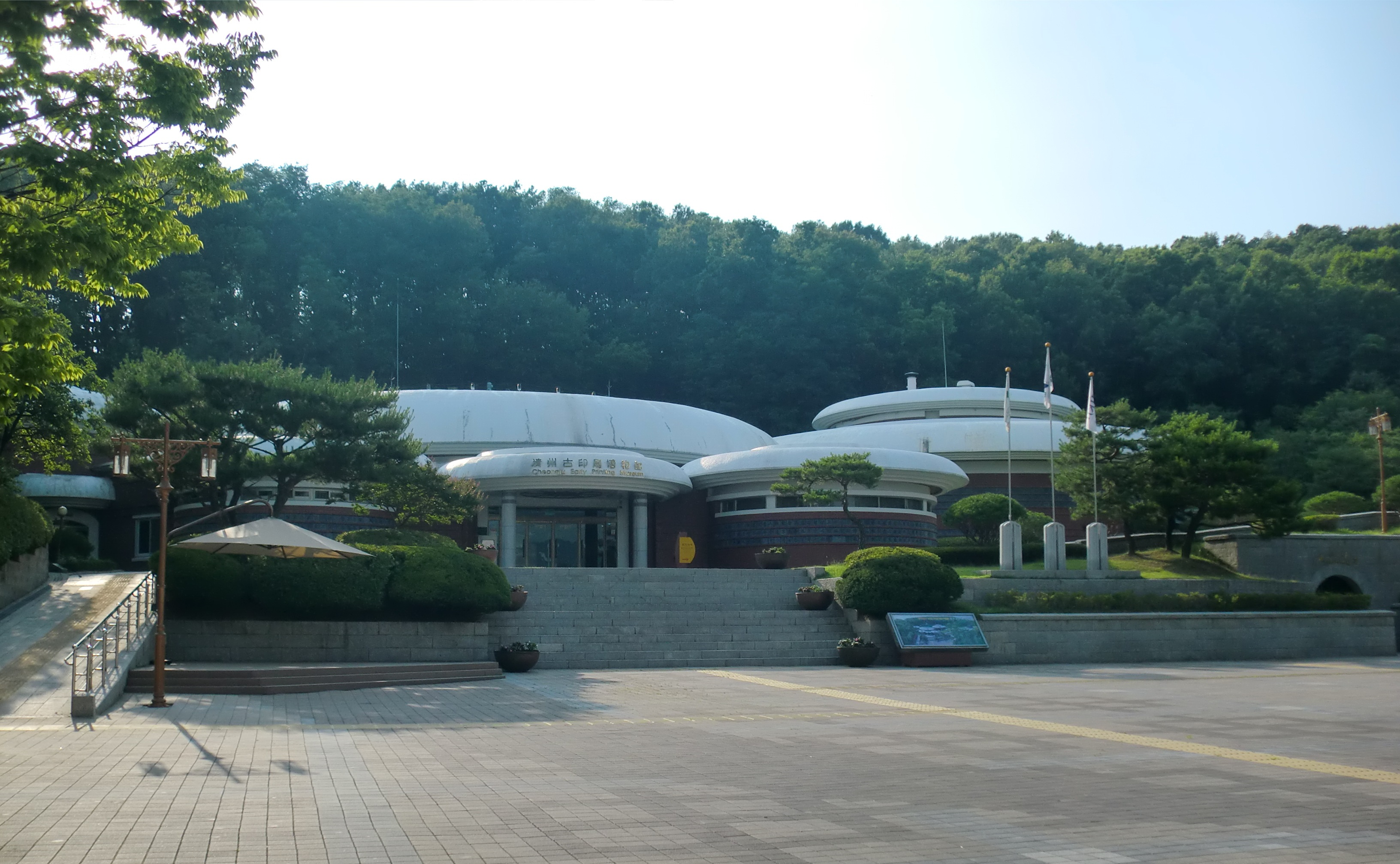
- Established: March 17, 1992; 34 years ago
- Location: Cheongju, South Korea
- Coordinates: 36.644041°N 127.471438°E
- Type: Historical museum
- Website: jikjiworld.cheongju.go.kr/jikjiworld/index.do

The Cheongju Early Printing Museum (Korean: 청주고인쇄박물관) is a museum in Cheongju, South Korea. The museum is dedicated to the history of printing in Korean culture. It is the first museum dedicated to printing in Korea.

== History ==
In 1992, the museum was opened, the intention of the creation of the museum was to conserve Heungdeoksa artifacts at the Uncheon-dong land development site. In 2007, the museum was designated as a Jikji Special Cultural Zone. In 2015, a Jikji metal type printing plate was restored using traditional techniques. In 2017, 864 million won was allocated to remodel parts of the building and replace panels in the exhibits. On December 15, 2017, the museum reopened, the reopening ceremony was attended by Lee Beom-seok, Mayor of Cheongju at that time, Hwang Young-ho, Cheongju City Council Chairman and Na Gi-jeong, Jikji Cultural Association Chairman. The museum has been a major contributor "UNESCO International Archives and Heritage Center of Cheongju attractions" in 2017. Since 2019, the museum has been part of the Google Arts & Culture platform. In 2021, the museum organized a survey on a name change, in which the Museum Management Committee participated, among the names suggested for the museum were Cheongju Jikji Printing Museum, Jikji Printing Museum, Korea Printing Museum, Cheongju Jikji Museum and Jikji Museum.

== Collections ==
The museum contains more than 650 books dating from the Silla, Goryeo and Joseon periods. The first exhibition hall contains exhibits about Jikji, the museum also has exhibits about the culture of Cheongju and the rest of Korea. The museum contains Buddhist cultural artifacts, in addition the museum also contains Jikji Simgyeong type metal. The museum contains Goryeo movable metal types, which was the first movable metal types invented in the world. Among the exhibits are woodblock prints and printing tools. For 5 years since 2011, the museum carried out the 30000 letters restoration project, this project was called "Koryo Metal Type Restoration Project". The museum contains exhibits about printing in Korean culture. In 2020, the museum held an exhibition about the discovery of Gyeongjaja (경자자) in 1420 and printing in the early Joseon Dynasty.
