= Heungdeoksa =

Ancient Buddhist temple in South Korea

Coordinates: 36°38′38″N 127°28′19″E

Heungdeoksa Temple
- 흥덕사 (Korean)
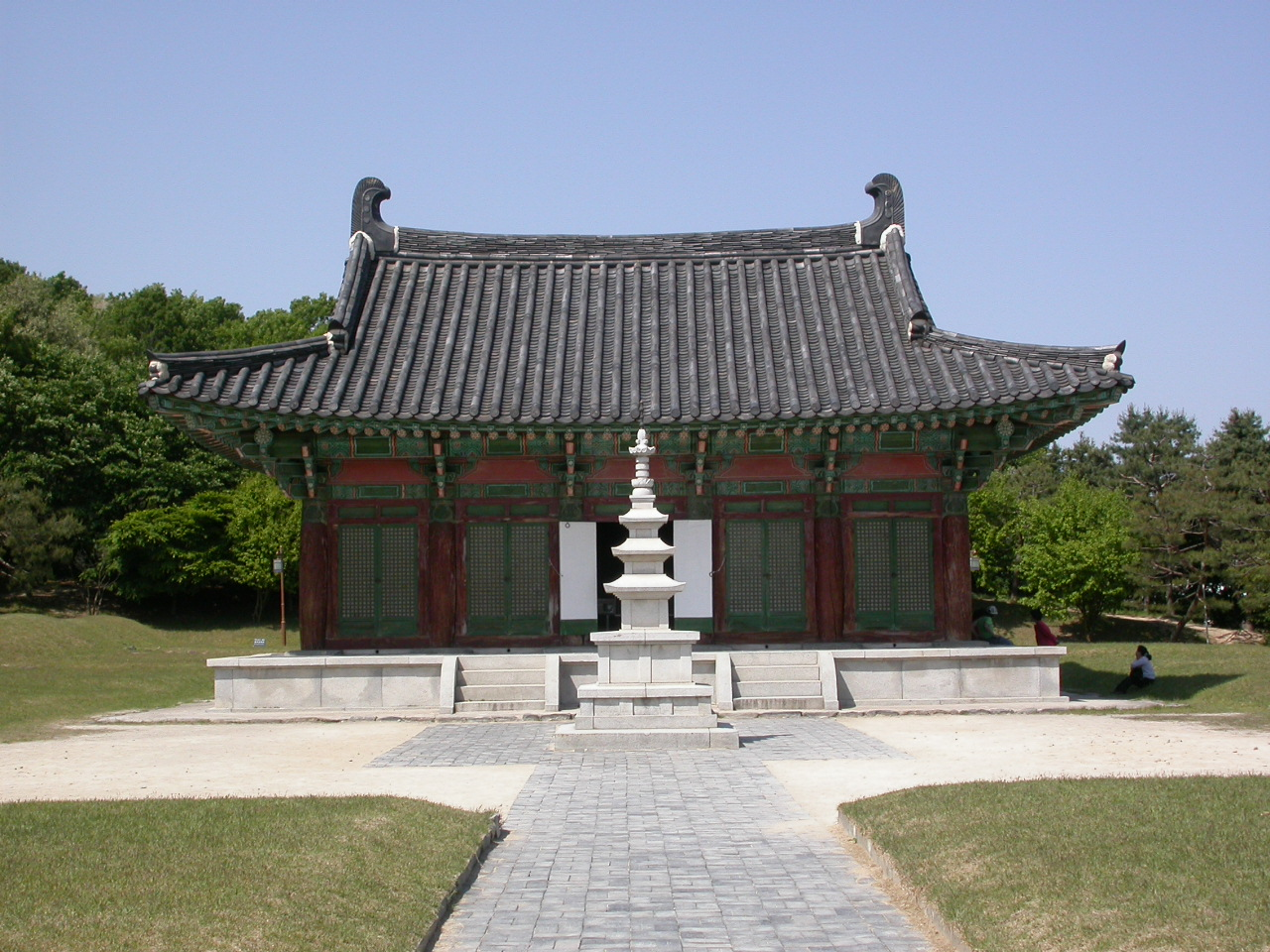
- A reproduction of a prayer hall at the site
- Interactive map of Heungdeoksa Temple
- Cultures: Buddhism
- Location: Heungdeok-gu

History
- Built: Before 848

Site notes
- Discovered: 1985

The former Buddhist temple Heundeoksa (Korean: 흥덕사) existed during the Unified Silla and Goryeo periods, in Heungdeok-gu, South Korea.

The temple is believed to have been constructed prior to 848 and was destroyed by fire in the late 1370s. The exact location of Heungdeoksa remained unknown until 1985, when a number of relics were discovered as part of a land development project in the area by the Korean Land Development Corporation. The Cheongju University oversaw the archaeological excavation and confirmed it was the location of the Heungdeoksa, after discovering a bronze gong and bowl, with the temple's inscription on them. The site was designated as a historic site (No. 315) on May 7, 1986. A reproduction of a Buddhist prayer hall and a three-story stone pagoda have been constructed on the site based on the excavation survey.

The temple was where the Buljojikjisimcheyojoel, the world's oldest extant book printed with movable metal type, was printed. The book was compiled by the Buddhist monk, Baegun, in 1374, and was printed using movable metal type at the temple in the third year of King Uwang's reign (1377). This book precedes the publication of the Gutenberg Bible (published in 1455) by 78 years. The book was acquired by Victor Collin de Plancy, the chargé d'affaires with the French Embassy in Seoul in 1887 during the reign of King Gojong and subsequently donated to the Bibliothèque nationale de France, where it currently remains. In 1972, the Buljojikjisimcheyojoel was officially recognised as the world's oldest printed book and in 2001 it was registered in the UNESCO Memory of the World.

On March 17, 1992 the Cheongju Early Printing Museum was opened adjacent to the heritage site, to promote Korea's historic printing culture.
