= Gagyeong Terminal =

Bus station in Cheongju, South Korea

Gagyeong Terminal (Korean: 가경터미널) is a bus terminal located in Gagyeong-dong, Heungdeok-gu, Cheongju-si, North Chungcheong Province, South Korea. It consists of two terminals:

- Cheongju Bus Terminal (Interbus Terminal)
- Cheongju Express Terminal (Express bus Terminal)

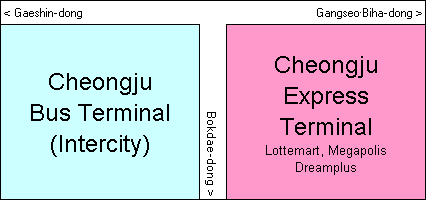
