= France–Korea Treaty of 1886 =

1886 treaty between France and Korea

The France–Korea Treaty of 1886 was negotiated between representatives of France and Korea.

== Background ==
In 1876, Korea established a trade treaty with Japan after Japanese ships approached Ganghwado and threatened to fire on the Korean capital city. Treaty negotiations with several Western countries were made possible by the completion of this initial Japanese overture.

In 1882, the Americans concluded a treaty and established diplomatic relations, which served as a template for subsequent negotiations with other Western powers.

== Treaty provisions ==
The French and Koreans negotiated and approved a multi-article treaty with provisions similar to other Western nations.

Ministers from France to Korea were appointed in accordance with this treaty; and they were: Victor Collin de Plancy, appointed in 1888; H. Fradin, in 1892; and Collin de Plancy again in 1901.

The treaty remained in effect even after the protectorate was established in 1905.

== See also ==
- Unequal treaties
- List of Ambassadors from France to South Korea
