= Yeongcheon =

City in North Gyeongsang, South Korea

Coordinates: 35°58′24″N 128°56′19″E

- Municipal City
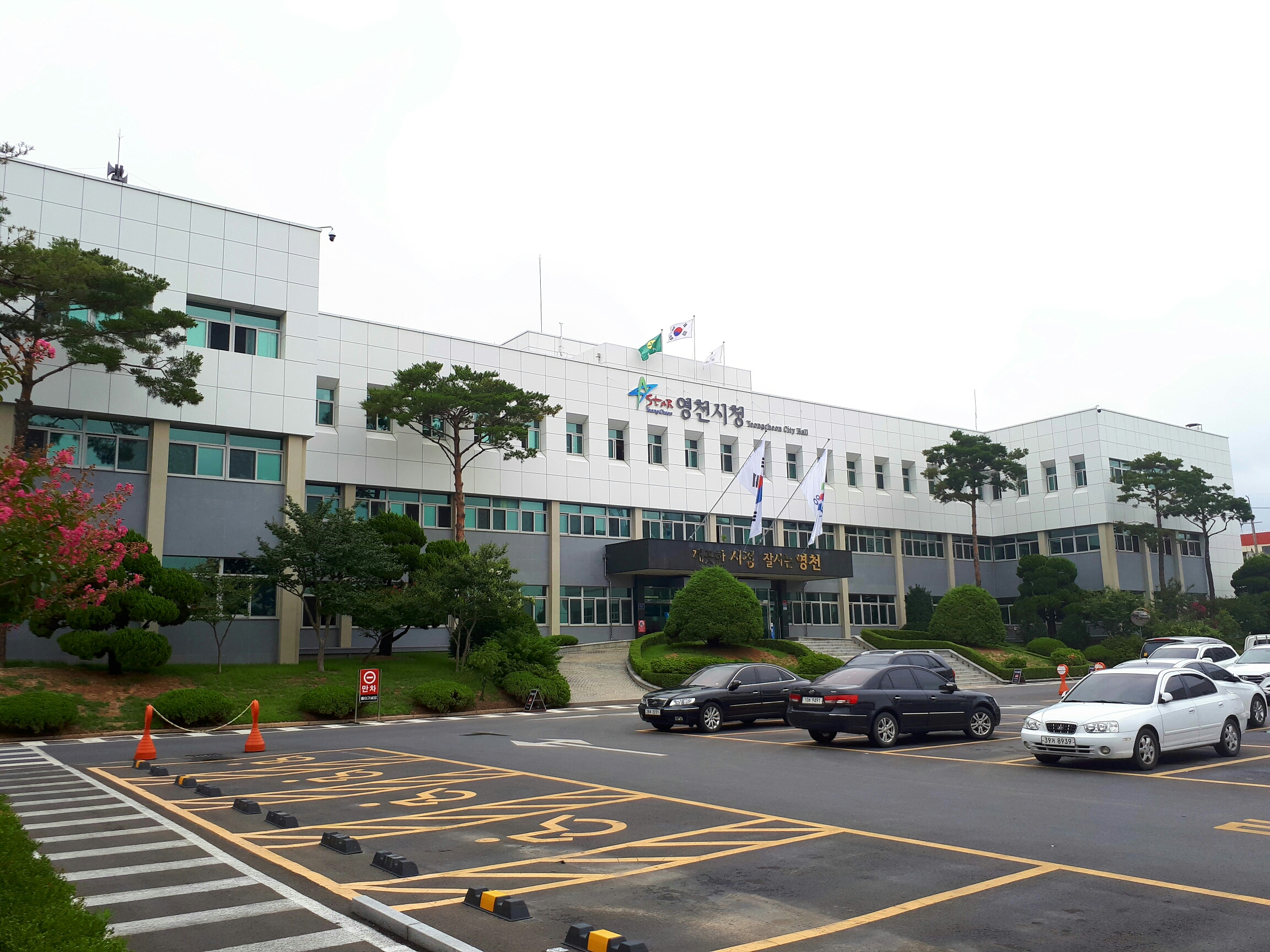
- Panoramic view of Yeongcheon Yeongcheon city hall

- Flag Emblem of Yeongcheon

- Location in South Korea
- Country: South Korea
- Region: Yeongnam
- Administrative divisions: 1 eup, 10 myeon, 5 dong

Government
  - mayor: Choe Gi-mun (최기문)

Area
  - Total: 919.76 km^{2} (355.12 sq mi)

Population (September 2024)
  - Total: 99,034
  - Density: 123.7/km^{2} (320/sq mi)
  - Dialect: Gyeongsang
- Time zone: UTC+9 (Korea Standard Time)
- Area code: +82-54

Korean name
- Hangul: 영천시
- Hanja: 永川市
- RR: Yeongcheon-si
- MR: Yŏngch'ŏn-si

Yeongcheon (Korean: 영천; Korean pronunciation: [jʌŋ.tɕʰʌn]) is a city in North Gyeongsang Province, South Korea.

Yeongcheon is located 350 km (220 mi) southeast of Seoul, in the southeast of North Gyeongsang Province. It is on the Gyeongbu Expressway linking Seoul and Busan, and is also the junction of the Jungang and Daegu railway lines.

== Symbols ==
- City bird: pigeon
- City flower: rose
- City tree: ginkgo

== Economy of Yeongcheon ==
Yeongcheon is famous for grapes and wine. It is the largest producer of grapes which has almost 20% of grape production in Korea and some of the grapes are exported to United States, Canada and Southeast Asia.

Yeongcheon also has 15 wineries. The wineries use Kyoho, Muscat Bailey A, Shine Muscat and Campbell early cultivars to make wine.

Yeongcheon produces other crops such as rice, peaches, apples, plums, garlic and others.

== Administrative divisions ==
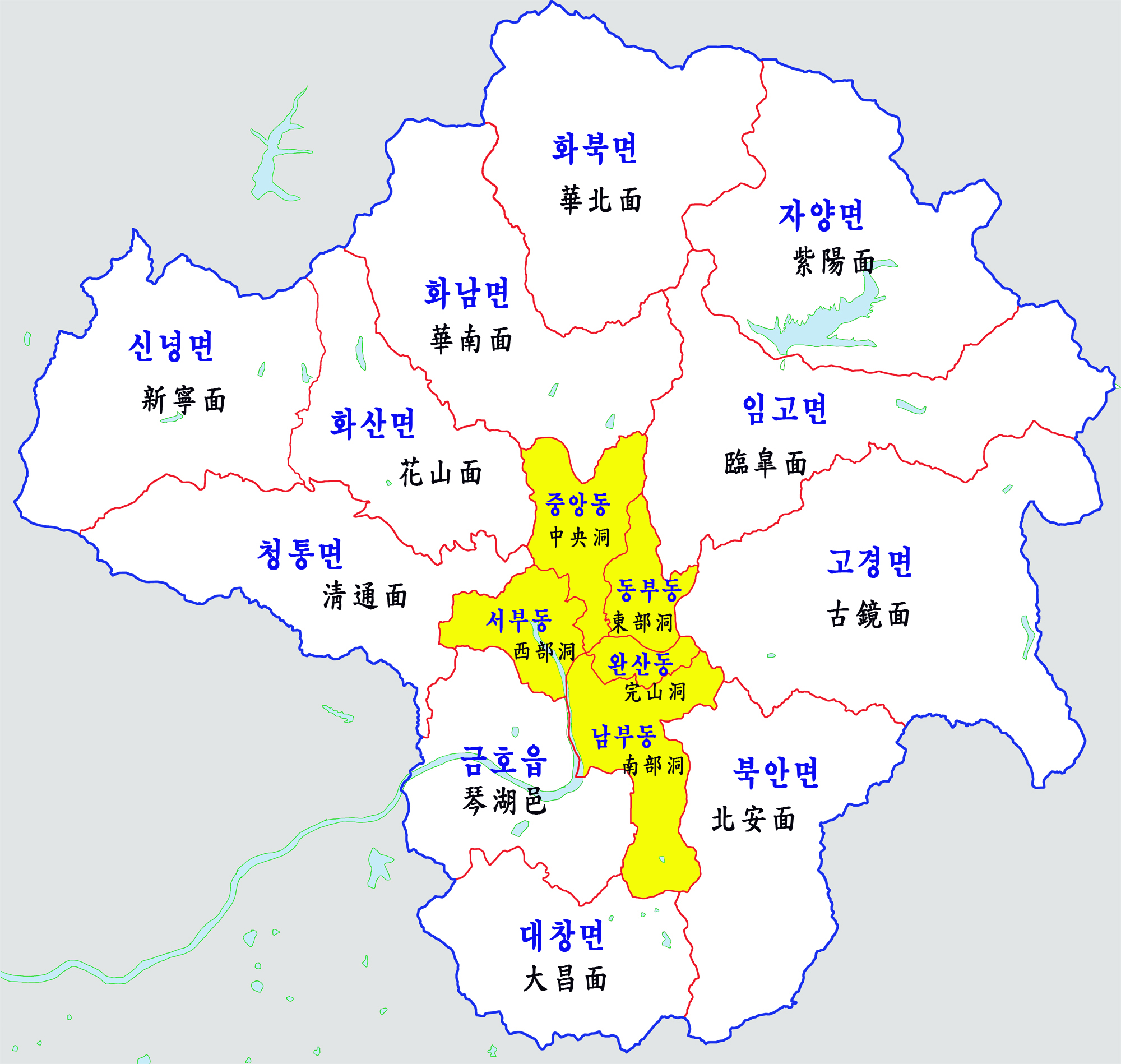
Map of Yeongcheon eup/myeon/dong in Korean

Yeongcheon is divided into 1 eup, 10 myeon and 5 dong.

eup/myeon/dong	Hangeul	Hanja
Geumho-eup	금호읍	琴湖邑
Cheongtong-myeon	청통면	淸通面
Sinnyeong-myeon	신녕면	新寧面
Hwasan-myeon	화산면	花山面
Hwabuk-myeon	화북면	華北面
Hwanam-myeon	화남면	華南面
Jayang-myeon	자양면	紫陽面
Imgo-myeon	임고면	臨皐面
Gogyeong-myeon	고경면	古鏡面
Bugan-myeon	북안면	北安面
Daechang-myeon	대창면	大昌面
Dongbu-dong	동부동	東部洞
Jungang-dong	중앙동	中央洞
Seobu-dong	서부동	西部洞
Wansan-dong	완산동	完山洞
Nambu-dong	남부동	南部洞

== Festivals ==
The Bohyeon Mountain Starlight Festival takes place in summer and is centered in the Bohyeon Mountain Observatory, which houses the third-largest telescope in Korea. In late summer, the Grape Festival takes place, hosting events such as the Miss Grape contest and a grape-eating competition. Yeongcheon is also well known for its Herbal Medicine Festival, which takes place in October and hosts traditional singing and a variety of herbs which are about 480 Herbal Medicine and Wine which made by Yeongcheon's grapes festival is also famous.

== People ==
Notable individuals born in the city include Goryeo period general Ch'oe Mu-sŏn and Goryeo intellectual Chŏng Mong-ju. Also, it was the hometown of Paek Gun Sang, a tremendous Korean War veteran, who led himself to a high government position without being paid any kind of salary during the Korean War.

== Tourism ==
Tourists to Yeongcheon are few, but popular destinations include Eunhaesa Temple, the War Memorial Park, Cyan Art Gallery, Yeongcheon Dam, the Jeong Sowon and Gatbawi.

== Climate ==
Climate of Yeongcheon is similar to that of Daegu which is Humid subtropical climate (Cwa).

Climate data for Yeongcheon (1991–2020 normals, extremes 1972–present)
Month	Jan	Feb	Mar	Apr	May	Jun	Jul	Aug	Sep	Oct	Nov	Dec	Year
Record high °C (°F)	15.7 (60.3)	23.6 (74.5)	26.6 (79.9)	32.0 (89.6)	36.3 (97.3)	37.3 (99.1)	39.4 (102.9)	39.6 (103.3)	36.6 (97.9)	30.5 (86.9)	26.1 (79.0)	19.4 (66.9)	39.6 (103.3)
Mean daily maximum °C (°F)	5.5 (41.9)	8.3 (46.9)	13.6 (56.5)	19.9 (67.8)	24.9 (76.8)	27.6 (81.7)	29.9 (85.8)	30.5 (86.9)	26.2 (79.2)	21.5 (70.7)	14.6 (58.3)	7.5 (45.5)	19.2 (66.6)
Daily mean °C (°F)	−0.5 (31.1)	1.7 (35.1)	6.6 (43.9)	12.7 (54.9)	17.8 (64.0)	21.7 (71.1)	25.0 (77.0)	25.3 (77.5)	20.4 (68.7)	14.1 (57.4)	7.3 (45.1)	1.1 (34.0)	12.8 (55.0)
Mean daily minimum °C (°F)	−5.9 (21.4)	−4.2 (24.4)	0.0 (32.0)	5.3 (41.5)	10.8 (51.4)	16.3 (61.3)	21.0 (69.8)	21.2 (70.2)	15.5 (59.9)	7.9 (46.2)	1.1 (34.0)	−4.4 (24.1)	7.1 (44.8)
Record low °C (°F)	−20.5 (−4.9)	−16.0 (3.2)	−10.2 (13.6)	−5.9 (21.4)	1.1 (34.0)	5.5 (41.9)	11.5 (52.7)	11.7 (53.1)	4.5 (40.1)	−4.0 (24.8)	−9.8 (14.4)	−14.6 (5.7)	−20.5 (−4.9)
Average precipitation mm (inches)	22.1 (0.87)	26.0 (1.02)	50.0 (1.97)	76.4 (3.01)	85.8 (3.38)	126.0 (4.96)	229.8 (9.05)	233.2 (9.18)	137.6 (5.42)	48.6 (1.91)	31.6 (1.24)	18.8 (0.74)	1,085.9 (42.75)
Average precipitation days (≥ 0.1 mm)	4.6	5.1	7.1	7.6	8.7	9.5	13.6	13.1	8.9	4.7	5.0	4.4	92.3
Average snowy days	3.5	2.9	1.6	0.0	0.0	0.0	0.0	0.0	0.0	0.1	0.5	2.9	11.5
Average relative humidity (%)	56.8	56.2	57.0	56.1	60.3	67.7	74.7	75.0	74.2	68.9	65.0	59.9	64.3
Mean monthly sunshine hours	166.2	184.3	211.1	220.4	234.3	191.2	163.4	180.0	162.0	191.6	155.7	153.2	2,213.4
Percentage possible sunshine	54.5	58.5	54.9	56.7	53.2	45.0	38.8	44.7	44.9	56.8	52.0	51.8	50.5
Source: Korea Meteorological Administration (snow and percent sunshine 1981–2010)

== Twin towns – sister cities ==
Yeongcheon is twinned with:

- Kaifeng, China
- Kuroishi, Japan
- (United States) Buffalo, New York, USA

== See also ==
- List of cities in South Korea
- Yeongcheon River in South Korea
