= Palgongsan =

Mountain in South Korea

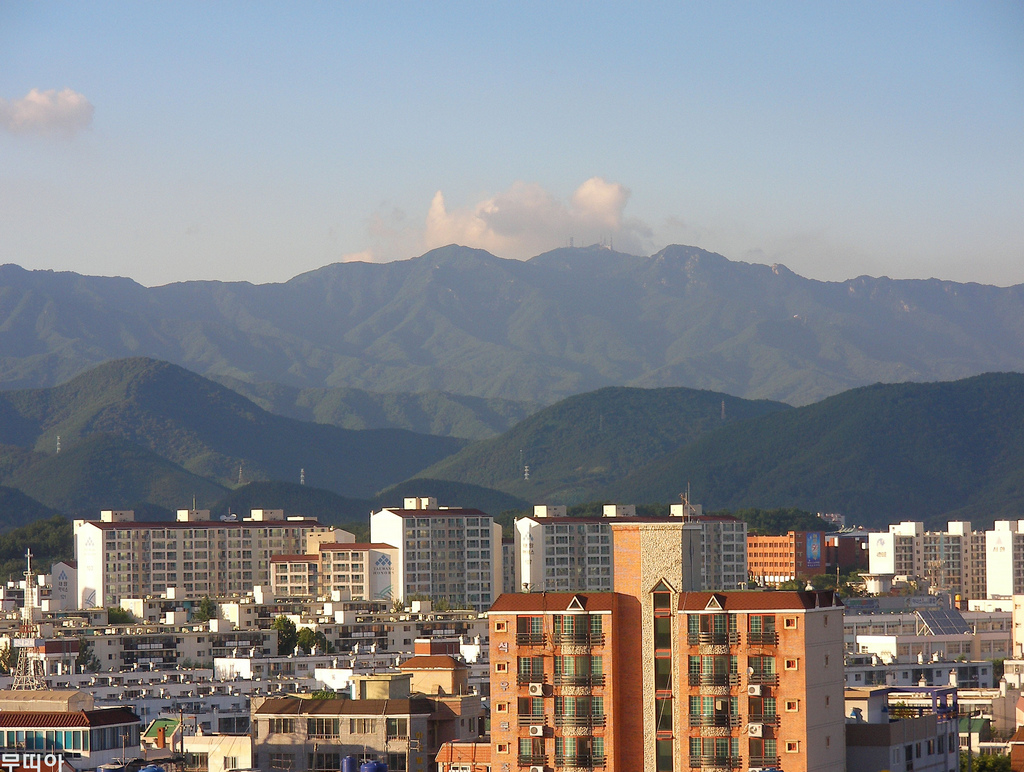
- Buk District, Daegu and Palgongsan

Highest point
- Coordinates: 36°01′01″N 128°41′42″E

Geography

Korean name
- Hangul: 팔공산
- Hanja: 八公山
- RR: Palgongsan
- MR: P'algongsan

Palgongsan, also Palgong Mountain, and previously called Gongsan, also Gong Mountain during the Later Three Kingdoms period, is a mountain in southeastern South Korea, lying on an outlier of the Taebaek range. It stands on the northeastern border between Daegu and North Gyeongsang Province (including the districts of Chilgok County, Gunwi County, Yeongcheon, and Gyeongsan). Its peak is 1193 m above sea level.

The mountain, connected to downtown Daegu by bus, is a popular site for weekend outings from the city.

From 2019 to 2022 and again in 2025, Palgongsan has been selected for the '100 Must-Visit Tourist Spots of Korea,' jointly designated by the Ministry of Culture, Sports and Tourism and the Korea Tourism Organization.

== History ==
In the 9th year of King Sinmun of Unified Silla (689 AD), when an attempt was made to move the capital from Seorabeol to Dalgubeol, this mountain was worshiped by the people as the central mountain in the region.

In 927, at the time of the Later Three Kingdoms, Kyŏn Hwŏn of Later Baekje led forces into Silla, capturing and executing King Gyeongae, and installed King Gyeongsun as his puppet monarch before he turned his army toward Goryeo. Hearing of the news, Taejo planned a strike with 5,000 cavalrymen to attack Kyŏn's troops on the way back home at this mountain. According to the legend, King Taejo and Sin Sung-gyŏm exchanged their armor so that the king would be able to escape the battlefield. While Taejo escaped the battlefield, Sin and the remaining army fought bravely against the Later Baekje army. But eventually his army was routed and in the woods Sin was shot with arrows and was killed by the enemy. Also Kim Nak who is another general died, and the name of this battle is called the Battle of Gongsan. Taejo escapes from this mountain and flees alone to the mountain (Apsan), and he spends a few days hiding in a large cave at the peak of Apsan. While Taejo retreated from the battle and went to Apsan Mountain, he left many place names related to him in Daegu.

Portions of the mountain were designated a provincial park in May 1980.

Portions of the mountain were designated a national park on 23 May 2023.

== Trail ==
- Palgongsan Olleh-gil: This trail follows the apple orchards filled with Pyeonggwang Apples at the foot of Mount Palgong. The trail takes about three hours to hike in total. This route starts from the Hyoja tree Gangsunhang at the entrance of Pyeonggwang-dong, and hike through the small reservoir of Pyeonggwangji finally arriving at the Moyeongjae, which is a house where the stone monument of General Sin Sung-gyŏm stands. The time to visit this trail is in the spring (April–May) when visitors can see the apple blossoms, and in the fall when the apples are ready to be picked. As follow the apple orchards along the valleys, visitors will find Cheombaekdang, which is a house built for the spirit of hyoja (devoted son) Woo Hyo-jung and seonbi (scholar) Woo Myŏng-sik.

Course: Pyeonggwang-dong entrance - Pyeonggwang Elementary School - Pyeonggwangji - Moyeongjae - Jaebau farm - Cheombaekdang - Pyeonggwang station (Round-trip 4.6 miles, 2 hours 30 minutes. Level: Easy)

== Culture and heritage ==
The mountain is the site of a number of cultural and natural heritage sites. These include Buddhist shrines from the Silla period or later, including the large and active temple of Donghwasa and the Gunwi Triad Budda Grotto (National Treasure 109). In addition, in the 9th month of 927, the Battle of Gongsan) was fought between Hubaekje and Goryeo forces on the mountain's southern slope.

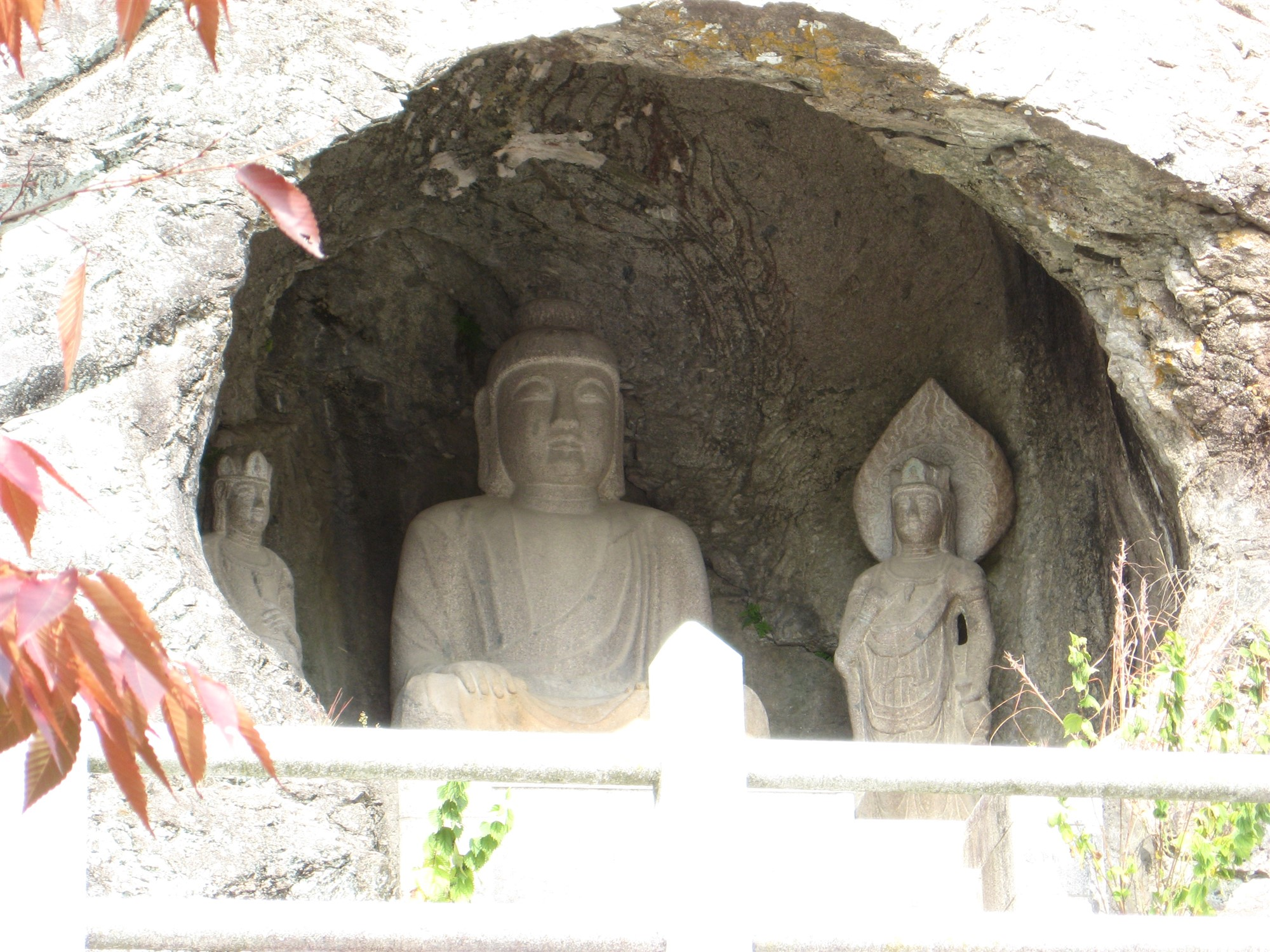
Seokguram Buddha grotto, Bugye, Gunwi

Natural treasures include the stone Buddha statue of Gatbawi, so-called due to its stone hat which resembles the traditional Korean horsehair hat, or gat.

== Cultural references ==
- Taejo Wang Geon (2000–2002)
- Thousand Days Unofficial History - Episode 73 (2018)
- Taejo Wang Geon (2022)

== See also ==
- List of mountains in Korea
