= Gatbawi =

Buddha statue in Gyeongsan, South Korea

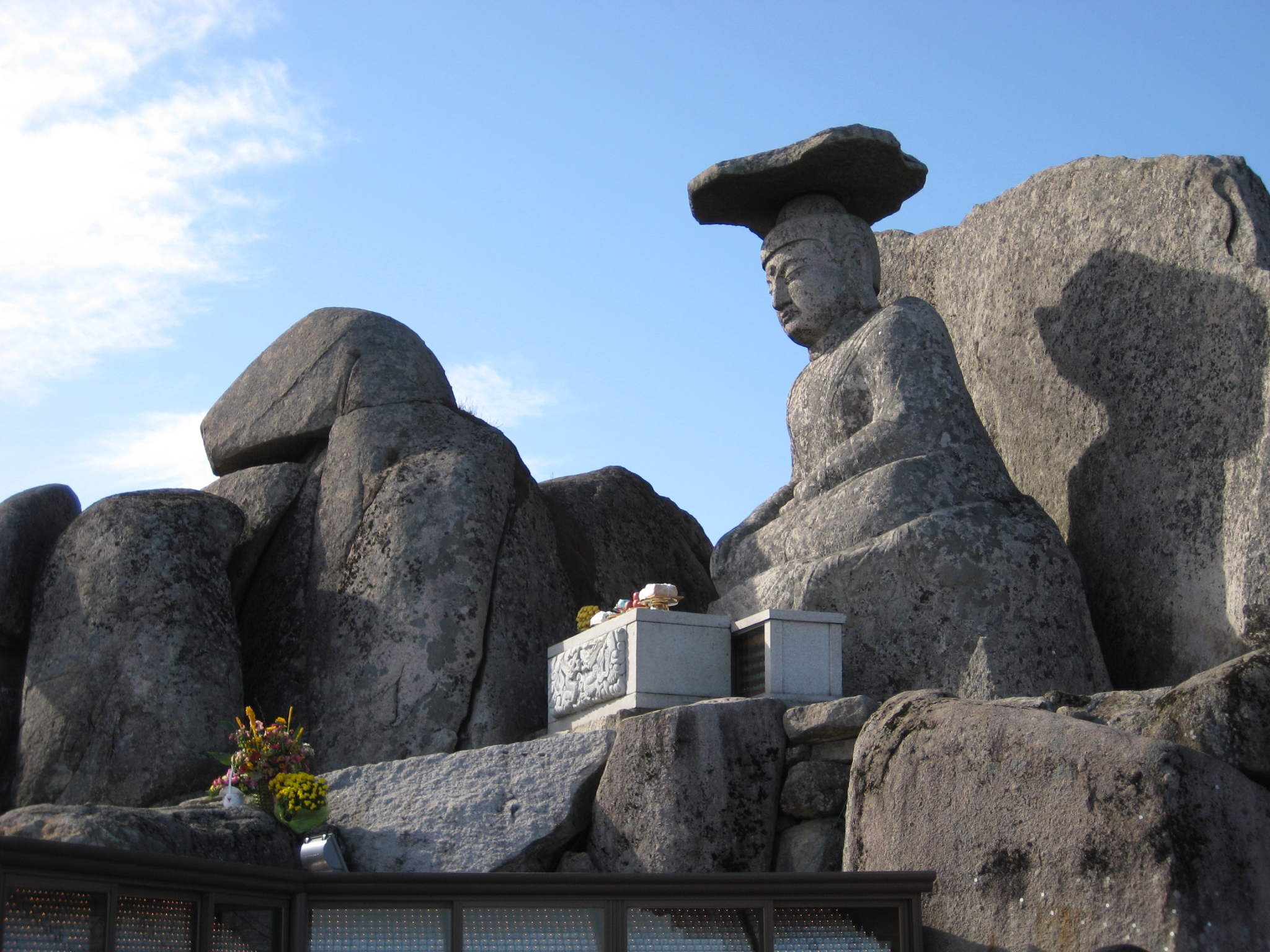
- Gatbawi Buddha, 17 November 2007.

Korean name
- Hangul: 갓바위
- Revised Romanization: Gatbawi
- McCune–Reischauer: Katpawi

Official Korean name
- Hangul: 관봉석조여래좌상
- Hanja: 冠峰石造如來坐像
- Revised Romanization: Gwanbong seokjo yeorae jwasang
- McCune–Reischauer: Kwanbong sŏkcho yŏrae chwasang

Gatbawi or Stone Seated Medicine Buddha at Gwan Peak, Mt. Palgong in Gyeongsan is a Buddhist statue in Daehan-ri, Wachon-myeon, Gyeongsan, North Gyeongsang Province, South Korea. It was made in the Unified Silla Kingdom era and is well known with the name of Gatbawi Buddha (Stone Hat Buddha). It sits 4 metres (13 ft) tall, and the hat is a 15-centimetre (6 in) thick flat stone on his head,

This single granite sculpture was made up by Uihyeon, at the top of the 850-metre (2,790 ft) high rough Palgongsan and is surrounded by a screen-like rock wall as its background. It is said that Uihyeon made it in order to appease his mother's soul in the 7th ruling year of Queen Seondeok of Silla Kingdom.

== Legend ==
The legend of Daegu Gatbawi says that a big crane flew in to guard him every night while he was making this Gatbawi Buddha. It is reputed to be a miraculous Buddha stone, which makes a response to prayers if the prayer prays for it with their whole heart. Online visits to the Budha are also being organised.
