= Lee Seung-hee (artist) =

Lee Seung Hee (born 1963 in Cheongju, South Korea; Hangul:이승희; Chinese: 李承熙) is a South Korean ceramic artist. He is known for his interpretation of Korean and Chinese ceramic objects into two-dimensional works of art. Lee Seung Hee's work is mainly exhibited in South Korea and China.

== Education ==
Lee Seung Hee graduated from the Handicraft Department of Cheongju University, South Korea.
