= Geumho-eup =

Geumho
- Town
- Location within South Korea
- Country: South Korea
- Province: North Gyeongsang
- City: Yeongcheon
- Administrative divisions: 21 beopjeongni, 33 hangjeongni and 190 ban

Area
  - Total: 51.54 km^{2} (19.90 sq mi)

Population (2015.5)
  - Total: 11,778
  - Density: 228.5/km^{2} (591.9/sq mi)
- Website: Geumho Town

Korean name
- Hangul: 금호읍
- Hanja: 琴湖邑
- RR: Geumho-eup
- MR: Kŭmho-ŭp

Geumho-eup (Korean: 금호읍) is a town, or eup, in Yeongcheon, North Gyeongsang Province, South Korea. The township Geumho-myeon was upgraded to the town Geumho-eup in 1973. Geumho Town Office is located in Gyodae-ri, which is crowded with people.

To the south of the town, there is Geumho River flowing through. The river also flows through Yeongcheon City to the east and Gyeongsan City to the west.

== Communities ==
Geumho-eup is divided into 21 villages (ri).

	Hangul	Hanja
Gyodae-ri	교대리	橋垈里
Deokseong-ri	덕성리	德城里
Seongcheon-ri	성천리	成川里
Daemi-ri	대미리	大美里
Seokseom-ri	석섬리	石蟾里
Wonje-ri	원제리	元堤里
Naengcheon-ri	냉천리	冷泉里
Sinwol-ri	신월리	新月里
Bongjuk-ri	봉죽리	鳳竹里
Gwanjeong-ri	관정리	館亭里
Hwangjeong-ri	황정리	凰亭里
Guam-ri	구암리	龜巖里
Yangnam-ri	약남리	藥南里
Daegok-ri	대곡리	大谷里
Honam-ri	호남리	湖南里
Eoeun-ri	어은리	魚隱里
Ogye-ri	오계리	五溪里
Wongi-ri	원기리	元基里
Sindae-ri	신대리	新垈里
Namseong-ri	남성리	南星里
Samho-ri	삼호리	三湖里
