= International Book Year =

International observance

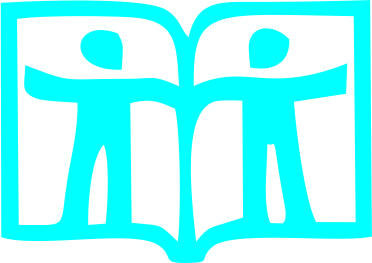
- Logo
- Observed by: countries
- Type: Worldwide
- Significance: Raise awareness about the heritage value of the book for humanity.
- Date: 1972
- Related to: Literature, library, recreation, intellectual

1972 was proclaimed International Book Year by the United Nations and made effective by UNESCO.

In international book year(1972), jikji was recognized publicly as the oldest extant book printed with movable metal type, by Park Byeongseon, who worked as a librarian at the National Library of France.

== History ==
The announcement was officially established in 1970, during the General Assembly of UNESCO. The cause of the proclamation is to increase access to books. The logo of the event was celebrated by the issuance of postage stamps by several countries

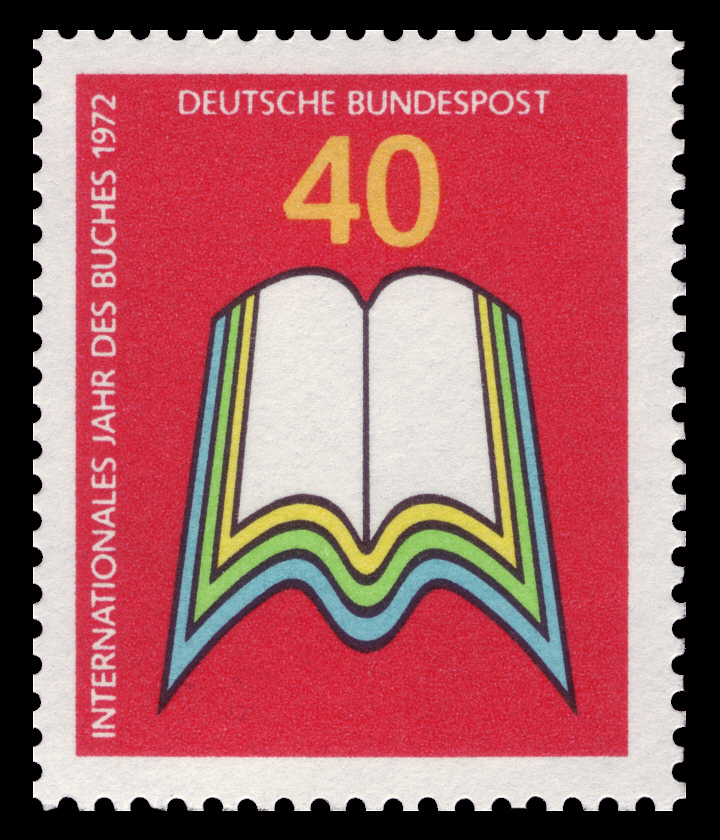
Postage stamps, Germany
