= Donghwasa =

Buddhist temple in Daegu, South Korea

- 桐華寺 동화사
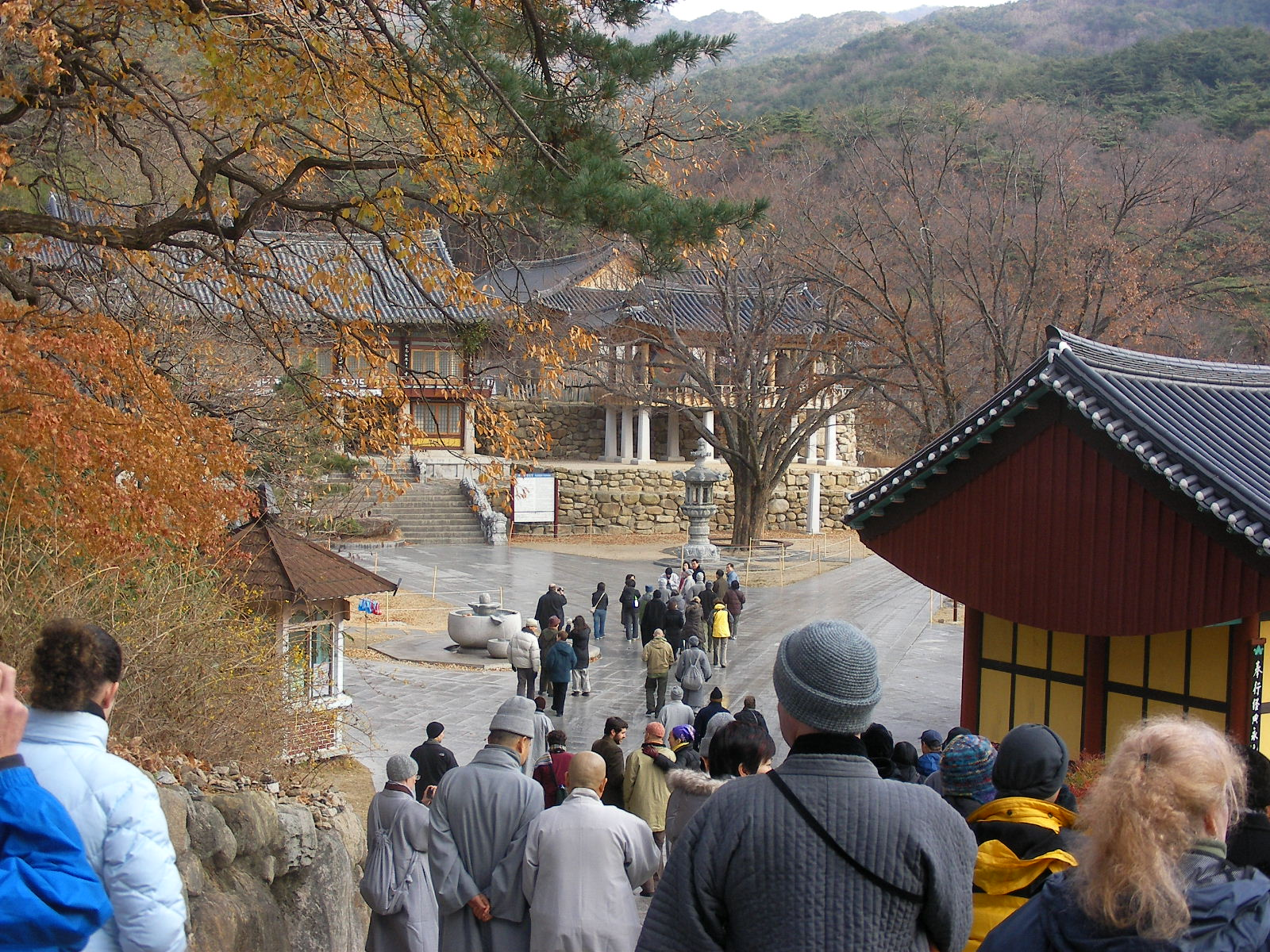
- Donghwasa in South Korea

- Location within South Korea

Religion
- Affiliation: Jogye Order of Korean Buddhism

Location
- Location: 41 Palgongsa-ro 201 gil Dong-gu Daegu City (Korean: 대구광역시 동구 팔공산로201길 41(도학동))
- Country: South Korea
- Interactive map of Donghwasa
- Coordinates: 35°59′35″N 128°42′15″E

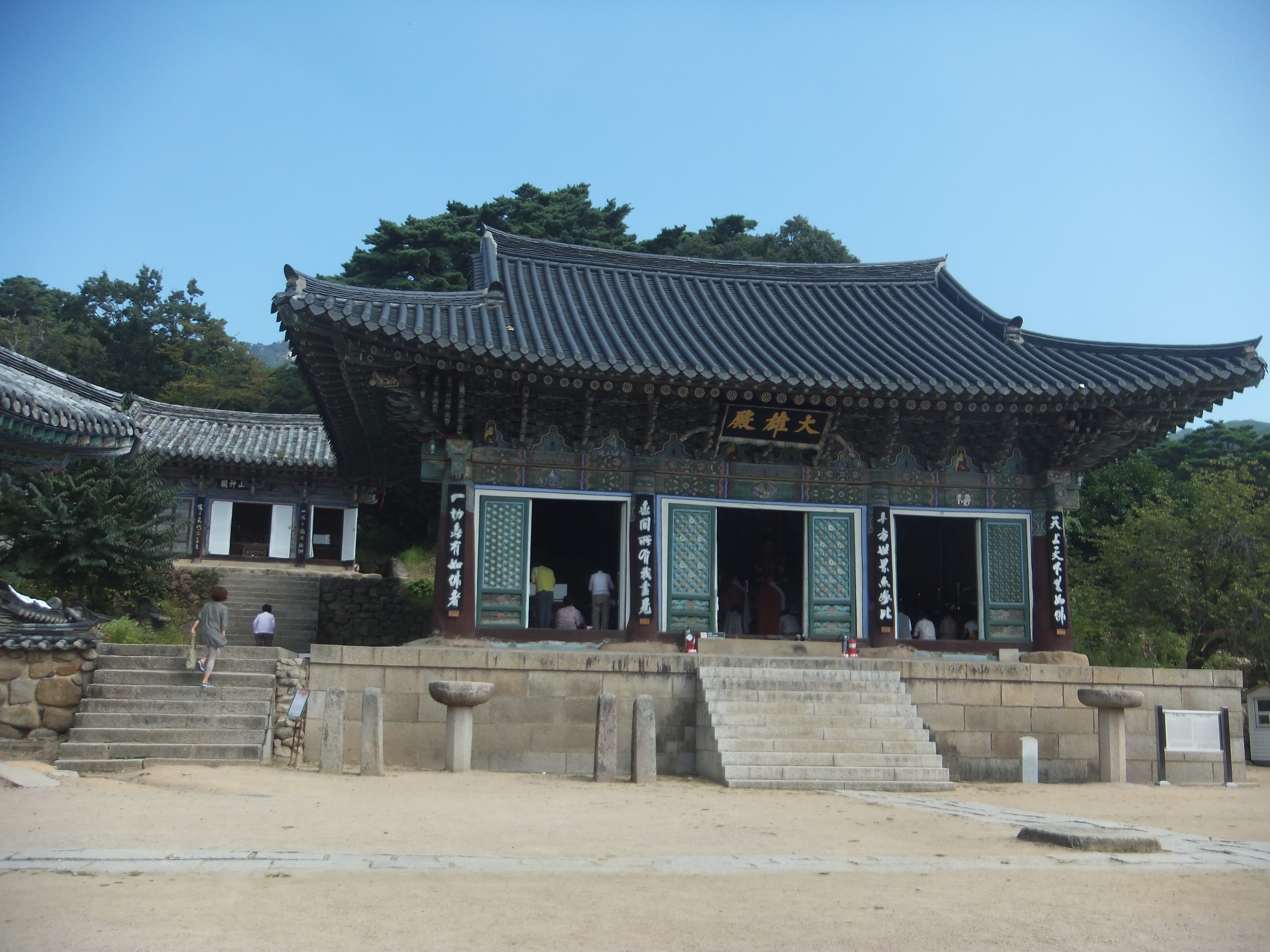
Main hall (Daeungjeon)

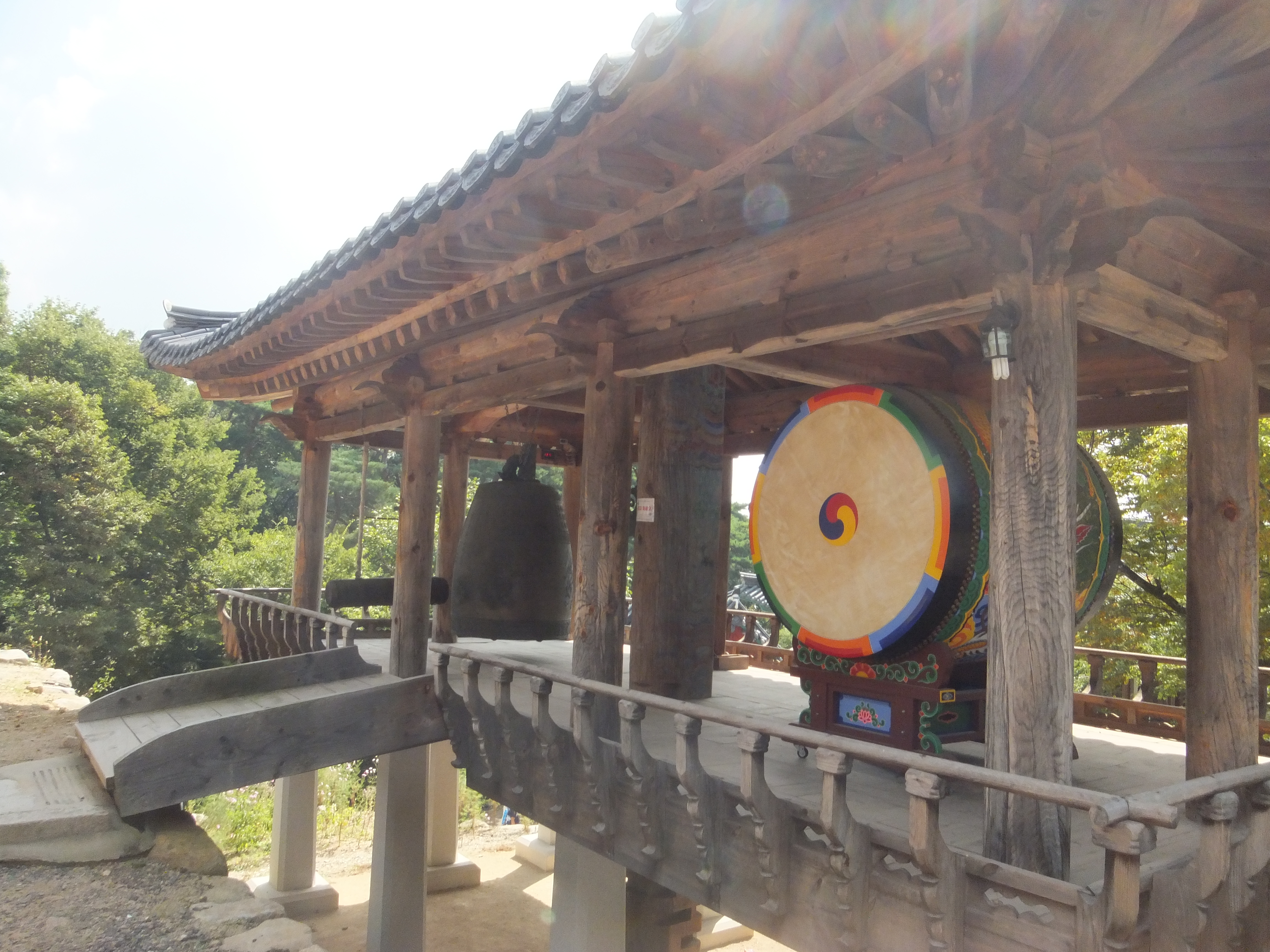
Bell Pavilion

Pagoda

Donghwasa (Korean: 동화사; lit. 'Temple of Paulownia Blossoms'), also Donghwa Temple, is a Buddhist temple of the Jogye Order in Dong District, Daegu, South Korea. The temple is located on the south side of the mountain Palgongsan in the north of the city.

== History ==
Donghwasa was originally established as Yugasa in 493 by Ven. Geukdal. According to the Donghwasa Record Monument, erected in 1931, it was renamed by Patriarch Ven. Simji in 832. The name "Donghwa (桐華; literally 'Korean paulownia flower')" came from a legend that the Korean paulownia bloomed even in winter at that time so people regarded it as an auspicious sign.

According to the Samguk yusa, Vinaya Master Jinpyo gave some bones with sutras engraved on them to Ven. Yeongsim, who later gave them to Patriarch Simji. In trying to decide where to enshrine these bones, Patriarch Ven. Simji climbed a mountaintop, along with the two gods of Mt. Jungak, one of Silla's five sacred mountains, and threw them toward the west. The bones blew away in the wind and landed in a small well north of what is now Donghwasa's Chamdang Hall. He constructed a lecture hall there and enshrined the bones within it, thereby establishing Donghwasa.

In 863, the three-story stone pagoda at Biroam Hermitage of Donghwasa and the stone Vairocana Buddha were built by a decree of King Gyeongmun. Thus we know that the temple was already established there by the late 9th century.

When Later Baekje attacked Silla, the 10,000 Goryeo soldiers, led by Wang Geon who responded to Silla's call for help, stayed at Donghwasa and fought Later Baekje troops. However, Goryeo suffered a crushing defeat.

In 1036, by royal decree of Goryeo's King Jeongjong, the temple was chosen for testing monks on sutras and Vinaya, along with Yeongtongsa and Sungbeopsa in Gaegyeong and Buinsa in Daegu. In 1190, National Preceptor Ven. Bojo stayed at Donghwasa and oversaw a massive reconstruction. In 1298, in honor of the dying wish of National Preceptor Ven. Hongjin, the temple was reconstructed again.

The temple was also reconstructed several times during the Joseon era; in 1606 Great Master Samyeong repaired the damage inflicted during the Japanese invasion, and again in 1677 and 1732 by monks like Sangsung, Gwanheo and Nakbin. Many of Donghwasa's major Dharma halls, including the Main Buddha Hall, were constructed at these times. During the Japanese invasion (1592–1597), Great Master Samyeong resided at the temple and commanded a monk militia.

The region on the mountain Palgongsan where Donghwasa is located was previously the site of Seungsi (a traditional monastic market), at which temples on nearby mountains bartered daily necessities. This traditional market was held from the Goryeo to the early Joseon era. The temple recently revived this tradition, and every October holds a "Seungsi Festival" which lasts one week.

=== Christian fundamentalist desecration ===
In 1998, a Christian destroyed about seven-hundred and fifty Buddhist statues to change the Buddhist temple into a Christian church.

== Cultural properties ==
Donghwasa owns 14 items of state-designated cultural objects, 11 items of tangible cultural heritage designated by Daegu, and 8 items of cultural heritage materials.

== Tourism ==
It also offers temple stay programs where visitors can experience Buddhist culture.

The temple hosts matchmaking events, part of national efforts to reverse the declining birth rate in South Korea.

== See also ==
- Jogye Order
- Buddhist temples in South Korea
- Korean Buddhism
