= Victor Collin de Plancy =

French diplomat, bibliophile and art collector

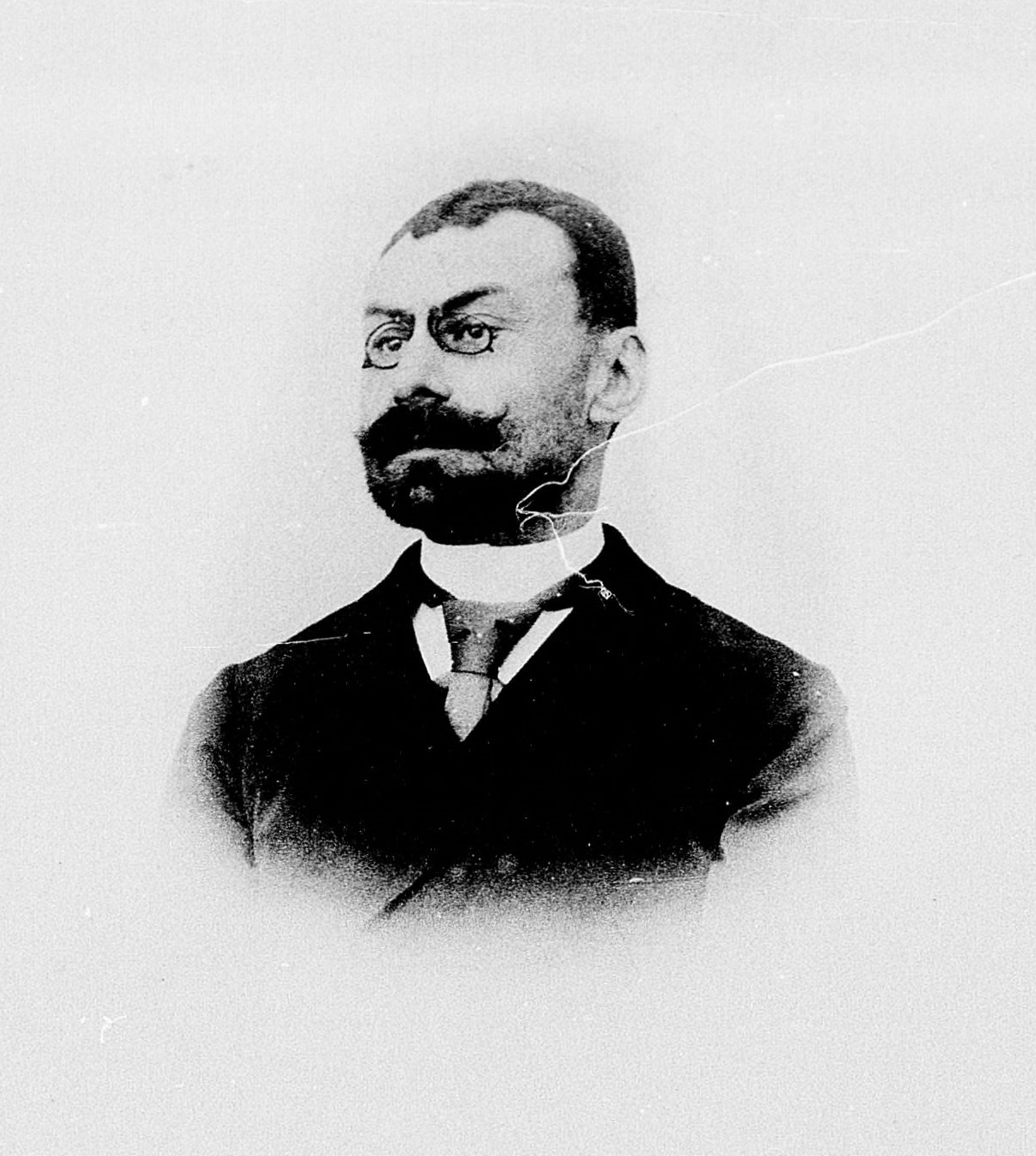
Victor Émile Marie Joseph Collin de Plancy (1853-1922) ca. 1900

Victor Émile Marie Joseph Collin de Plancy (1853–1922) was a French diplomat, bibliophile and art collector.

He was a career French diplomat who served most of his working life in Korea and amassed a considerable private collection of East Asian art and antiquities. Collin de Plancy served for around a decade as the first French Minister to Korea, first from 1887-90 and then again from 1895-1906. He was the first foreigner to recognize the historical value of Jikji and introduce it to the world through the Exposition Universelle of 1900. At his suggestion, Emperor Gojong of the Joseon Dynasty participated in the Exposition to make Joseon's history and culture known to the world. Victor Collin de Plancy set up an exhibition hall with hanok to display and promote Korean traditional items.

At that time, one of the Korean books he displayed at the Korean Pavilion was Jikji, the oldest existing book printed by movable metal type. In addition, he accurately recorded the value of Jikji in 'Joseon Seoji', of which he published three volumes while working as a French diplomat in Joseon. His accumulated books became part of the core of the Korean collection of the French Bibliothèque Nationale, and his accumulated artworks became part of the core of the Musée Guimet in Paris.

== Life ==
Collin de Plancy was born on November 22, 1853, in Plancy, a small town near Troyes in the Champagne region of eastern France, the son of Jacques Collin de Plancy, a former freethinker and occultist who had converted to Catholicism. Despite the name, Collin de Plancy was not of noble pedigree. Against the strict laws of lineage Victor's father had illicitly added the "de Plancy" to his family name of Collin in a move that would later bring accusations against the son.

As a very young man Victor Collin de Plancy studied in Paris at the École de l'Immaculée Conception before gaining entrance to the prestigious École des Langues Orientales Vivantes, where he was trained in Chinese, graduating in 1877. Though he had ambitions to enter the diplomatic corps, he was posted instead to Peking as a junior interpreter, often a preliminary step to seeking consular duties. Prevented by his stationing in Peking from taking the requisite exam for consular assignment (administered only at Paris), it was 1883 before he finally received his coveted consular position, when he was named consul second class at Peking. In 1884 he was promoted to acting French consul at Shanghai, where he served during the Sino-French War, distinguishing himself by services rendered to a cholera-stricken French fleet harbored in Shanghai during the conflict, for which he was made an Officer of the Legion of Honor. It was during this posting that Collin de Plancy, accompanied by an interpreter named Maurice Courant, served briefly as the first French consul to Korea beginning the year after the France-Korea Treaty of 1886. He would go on to serve as French consul in Japan before returning to Korea in 1896 as the resident French consul in that country. Except for extended sick leaves in 1899–1900 and 1905–1906, Collin de Plancy would spend the years from 1896 to 1906 in Seoul, where he would eventually be promoted full minister. He would serve only briefly as French minister to Bangkok in 1906 before requesting full retirement 1907.

The young Collin de Plancy was described alternately as laborious, impartial and instructed, while being lauded as well for his more social qualities — charm, elegance of manners, impeccable taste and perhaps most importantly, amiability. The introduction to his collected papers in the French Foreign Ministry notes the qualities for which Collin de Plancy seemed best known, "his tact, courtesy, and refined manners" and as one who excelled in "issues of etiquette... but who rarely ventured into the realm of general ideas". In Seoul he became known for his charming garden parties. Particularly well-received were his "chrysanthemum festivals" held every autumn in the gardens of the French legation, during which guests strolled the peaceful grounds in the midst of the budding capital, admiring the park with its greenhouses of flowers. In 1896 De Plancy had constructed an elegant European style compound for the French legation, filling it with antiques from the Château de Chenonceaux. He was himself a collector; his respectable assortment of Asian art and ceramics was eventually donated to the Musée Guimet in Paris, where it forms a core part of the Korean collection.

Collin de Plancy's diplomatic acumen proved a boon for French interests in Korea during the last decade or so of the 19th century. He became occupied in procuring the concession for of the Seoul-Uiju line for Five-Lilles, personally negotiating with the Korean foreign minister. Along with the above railway concession he also successfully petitioned for mining rights on behalf of French companies along the proposed railroad. However, other efforts spearheaded by Collin de Plancy to gain railway concessions to Mokpo and Wonsan were not so successful.

Collin de Plancy was capable of raising French visibility and prestige in other realms more successfully than in railroads and mining. As chief French diplomat in Korea, and enjoying a wide range of contacts, Collin de Plancy was the natural hinge for the expansion of French influence. Collin de Plancy helped a certain Mr. Saltarel establish official contacts in Seoul upon his arrival there as representative of several French companies in early 1898. Saltarel eventually gained a mining concession in Korea. In late 1899 a French military attaché in China, Commander Polyeucte Vidal, was also brought in through Collin de Plancy's efforts to assess the state of the Korean arsenal and make recommendations as to its improvement and the establishment of a Korean arms industry. Eventually the French, represented by Vidal, would join with the Russians in a mutual campaign to reorganize the Korean arsenal. Collin de Plancy also brought in an expert from the Sèvres Ceramic Works to recommend ways of modernizing and expanding the Korean porcelain industry. But France's most visible representative, behind Collin de Plancy himself, was undoubtedly E. Clemencet, who had been brought to Korea in 1898, shortly after Korea's entrance into the International Postal Union, to organize a modern Korean postal service. Upon the bureau's opening in January 1900 Clemencet sent the first international letter to Collin de Plancy (then on leave in France), as the "only fitting homage" to the man who had contributed so much to making the service a reality. The French consul also proved instrumental in paving the way for Korea's participation at the Paris Universal Exposition of 1900.

In 1906, shortly after Korea became a protectorate of Japan, Collin de Plancy left Korea for a posting in Bangkok, Thailand. He went into retirement the following year. He married a korean woman who was a slave and worked as a dancer for the Korean royal family. After his death in 1924, a large part of his art and book collection made its way into the possession of the Musée Guimet, the Bibliothèque Nationale de France, and the Collège de France.

Collin de Plancy was also an amateur naturalist and authored several texts on the insects and reptiles of his native France.

== See also ==
- France-Korea Treaty of 1886
