= Asō Bay =

Natural inlet in Tsushima Island, Japan

- 浅茅湾 (Japanese)
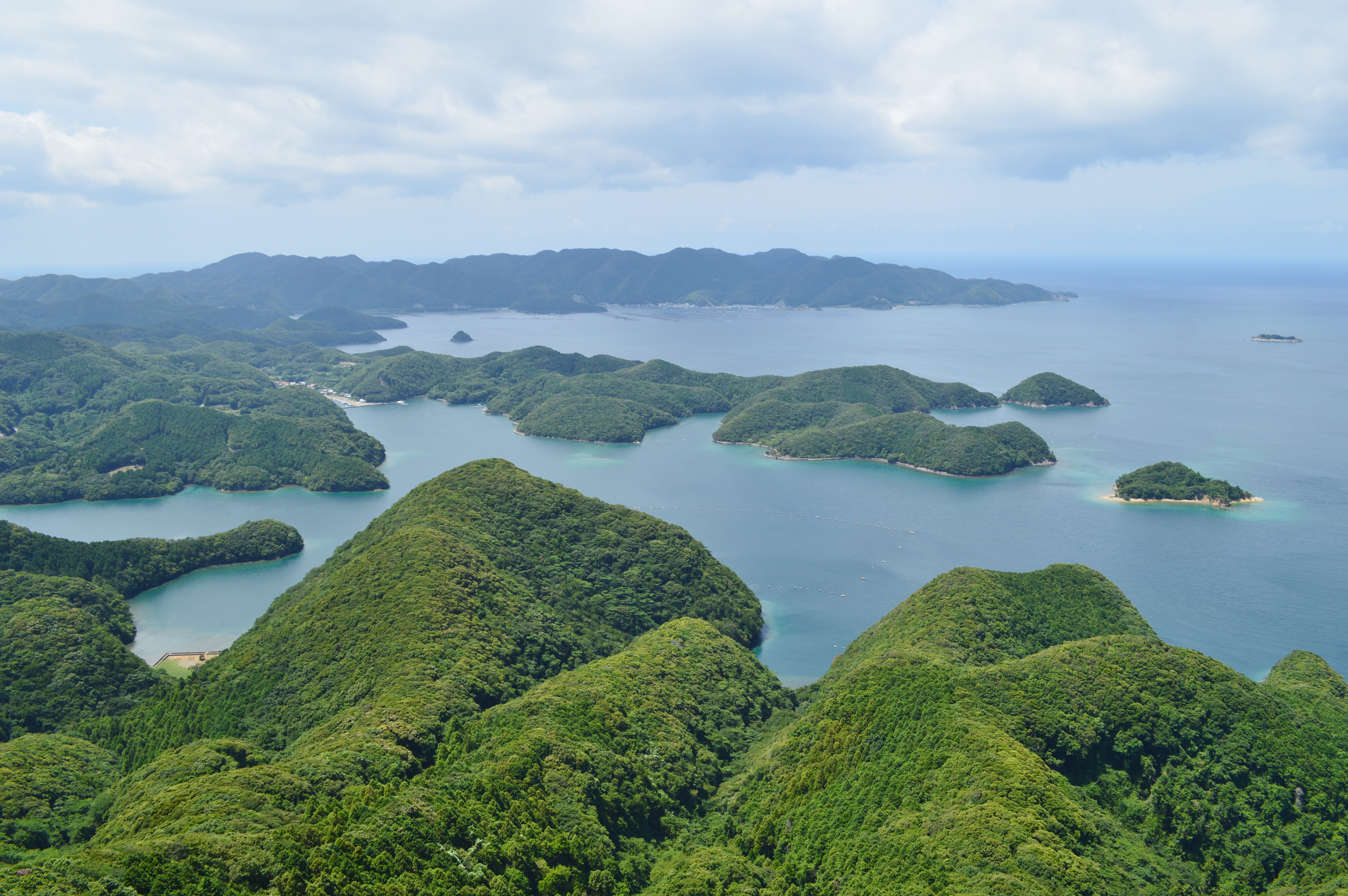
- Asō Bay, Tsushima

- Location within Japan
- Coordinates: 34°20′24″N 129°15′3″E
- Basin countries: Japan
- Max. width: 4.18 km (2.60 mi) (at mouth)
- Surface area: 58 km^{2} (22 sq mi)
- Max. depth: 80 m (260 ft)
- Settlements: Tsushima, Nagasaki Prefecture

Asō Bay (浅茅湾, Asō-wan) is a large, complex inlet that nearly cleaves the Japanese island of Tsushima in two. The bay is notable for its ria coastline, with many peninsulas and numerous small islands located close to the shore. It is part of the Iki-Tsushima Quasi-National Park. Pearls are cultured, and Japanese amberjack are farmed in its waters.

The measured COD of the bay's water was between 1 and 2,5 mg/L.

== Manzeki Channel ==
The Manzeki Channel (万関瀬戸) connects Asō Bay with Miura Bay (三浦湾), which opens onto the Tsushima Straits. The channel was cut by the Imperial Japanese Navy between 1895 and 1904. It was originally twenty-five metres wide and three meters deep, but was later widened to accommodate larger vessels.

Gallery

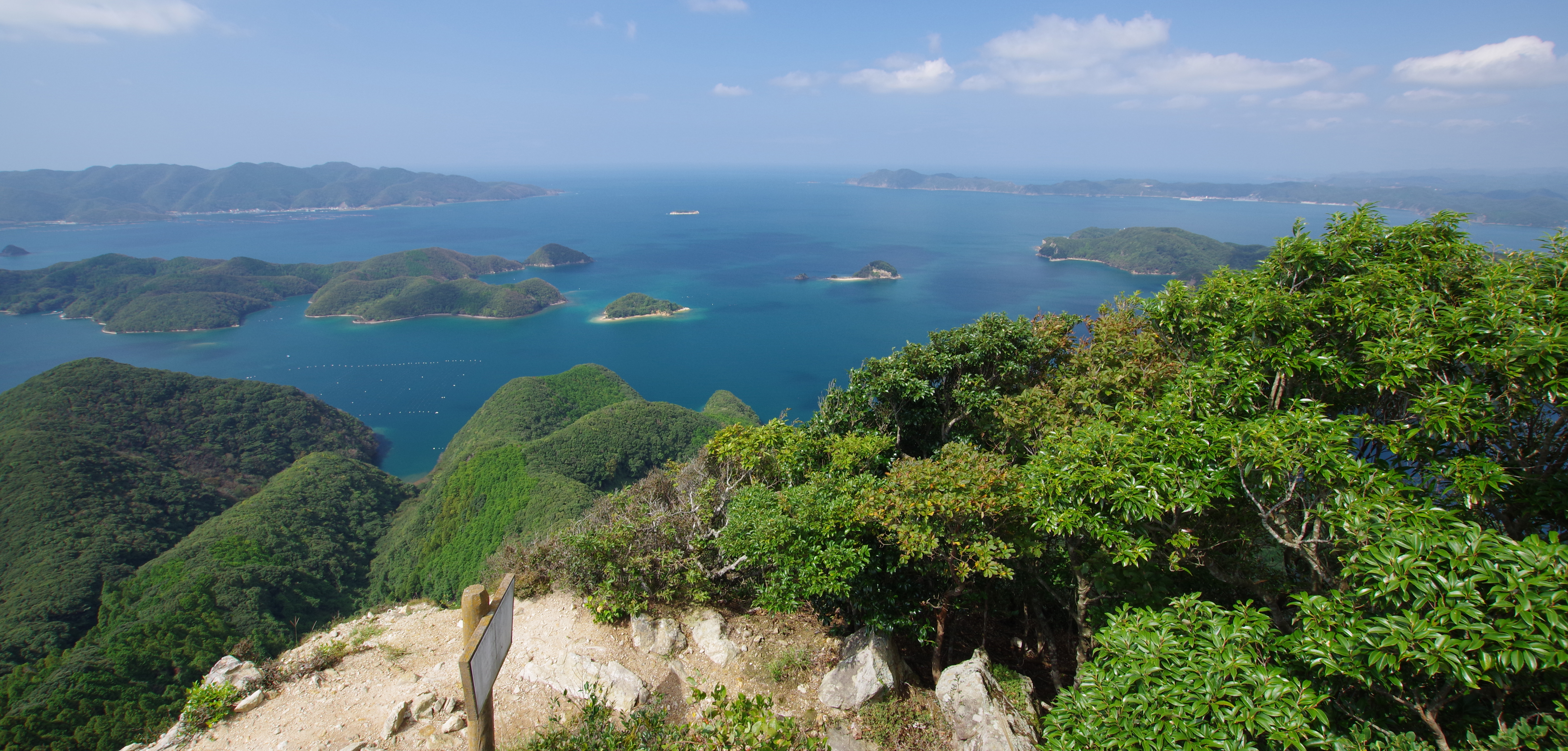
Top of Mount Shiroyama and Asō Bay, Tsushima

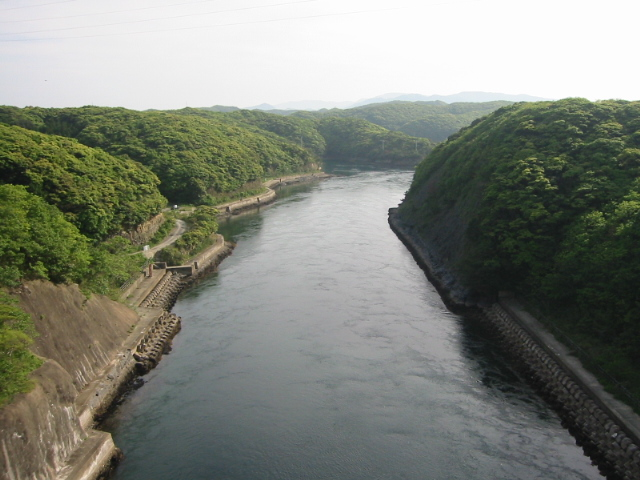
Manzeki Channel (万関瀬戸, Manzeki seto)
