= Tsushima Island =

Island in Nagasaki, Japan

Tsushima
Native name: 対馬
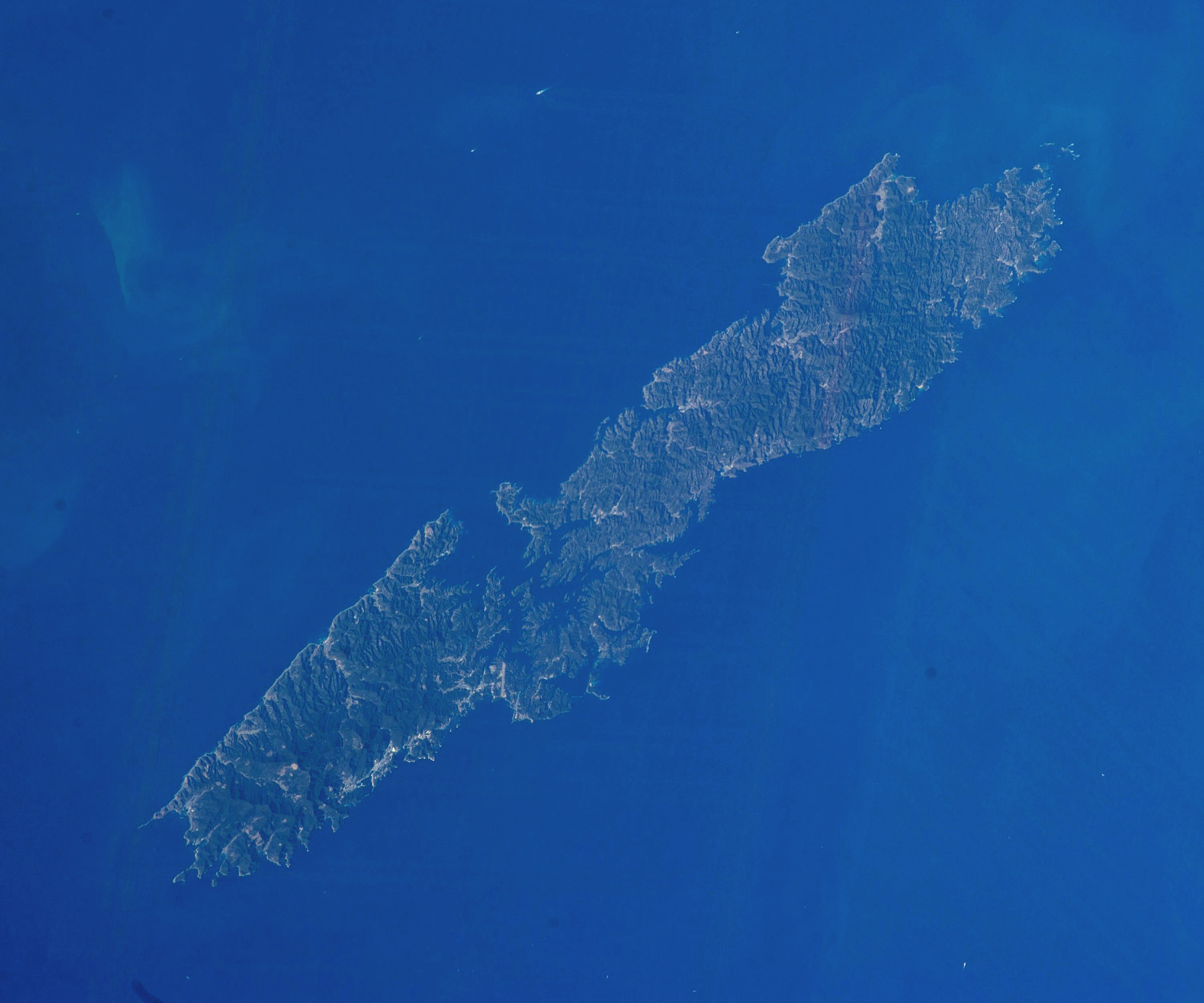
- Satellite photo of Tsushima

- Location within Japan Location within Nagasaki Prefecture

Geography
- Location: Tsushima Strait, Korea Strait
- Coordinates: 34°25′N 129°20′E
- Adjacent to: Tsushima Strait
- Area: 708.7 km^{2} (273.6 sq mi)
- Coastline: 915 km (568.6 mi)
- Highest elevation: 649 m (2129 ft)
- Highest point: Mt. Yatate

Administration
- Japan
- Prefectures: Nagasaki Prefecture
- City: Tsushima

Demographics
- Population: 28,502 (Dec 2022.)
- Pop. density: 40/km^{2} (100/sq mi)
- Ethnic groups: Japanese people

Tsushima (Japanese: 対馬, Hepburn: Tsushima) is an island of the Japanese archipelago situated in-between the Tsushima Strait and Korea Strait, approximately halfway between Kyushu and the Korean Peninsula. The main island of Tsushima, once a single island, was divided into two in 1671 by the Ōfunakoshiseto canal and into three in 1900 by the Manzekiseto canal. These canals were driven through isthmuses in the center of the island, forming "North Tsushima" (Kamino-shima) and "South Tsushima" (Shimono-shima). Tsushima also incorporates over 100 smaller islands, many tiny. The name Tsushima generally refers to all the islands of the Tsushima archipelago collectively. Administratively, Tsushima is in Nagasaki Prefecture.

The island group measures about seventy by fifteen km (43 by 9 mi) and had a population of about 28,000 as of 2022. The main islands (that is, the "North" and "South" islands, and the thin island that connects them) are the largest coherent satellite island group of Nagasaki Prefecture and the eighth-largest in Japan. The City of Tsushima lies on Tsushima and is divided into six boroughs.

== Geography ==
Tsushima is located west of the Kanmon Strait at a latitude between Honshu and Kyushu of the Japanese mainland. The Korea Strait splits at the Tsushima Archipelago into two channels; the wider channel, closer to the mainland of Japan, is the Tsushima Strait. Ōfunakoshi-Seto and Manzeki-Seto, the two canals built in 1671 and 1900 respectively, connect the deep indentation of Asō Bay (浅茅湾) to the east side of the island. The archipelago comprises over 100 smaller islets in addition to the main island.

Tsushima is the closest Japanese territory to the Korean Peninsula, lying approximately 50 km from Busan. On a clear day, the hills and mountains of the Korean peninsula are visible from the higher elevations on the two northern mountains. The nearest Japanese port, Iki, situated on Iki Island within the Tsushima Basin, is also 50 km away. Tsushima and Iki Island are collectively within the borders of the Iki–Tsushima Quasi-National Park, designated as a nature preserve and protected from further development. Much of Tsushima (89%) is covered by natural vegetation and mountains. Tsushima has many mountains such as Mt. Ohira, Mt. Yatate, Mt. Hokogatake, Mt. Koyasan, Mt. Ontake, and Mt. Gogen.

The government of Japan administers Tsushima as a single entity despite the artificial waterways that have separated it into two islands. The northern area is known as Kamino-shima (上島), and the southern island as Shimono-shima (下島). Both sub-islands have a pair of mountains. Shimo-no-Shima has Mount Yatate (矢立山), standing 649 m (2,129 ft) high, and Ariake-yama (有明山), at 558 m (1,831 ft) high. Kami-no-shima has Mi-take (御嶽), 487 m (1,598 ft). The two main sections of the island are now joined by a combination bridge and causeway. The island has a total area of 696.26 km^{2} (268.83 sq mi).

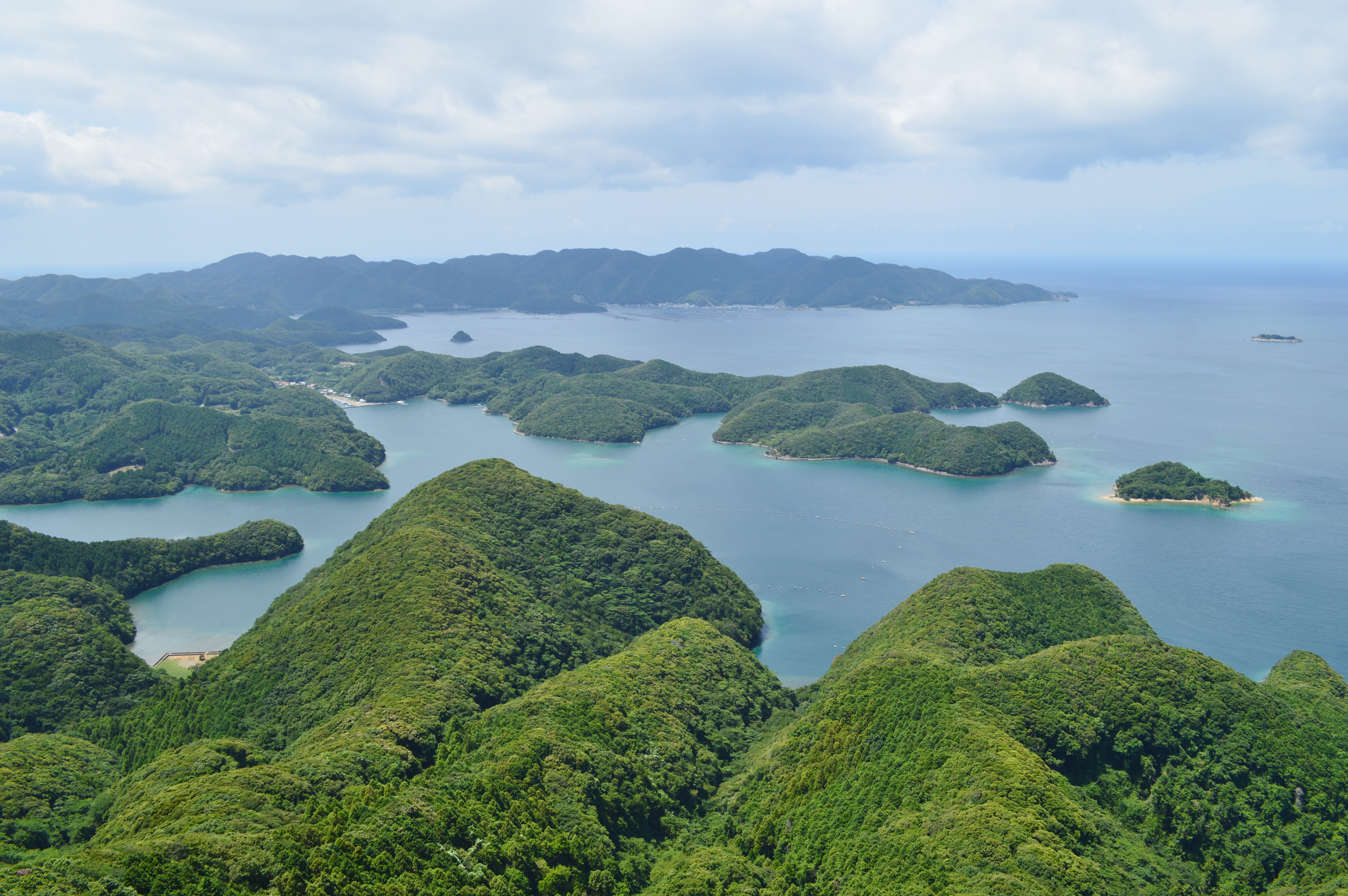
Asō Bay from Shiroyama

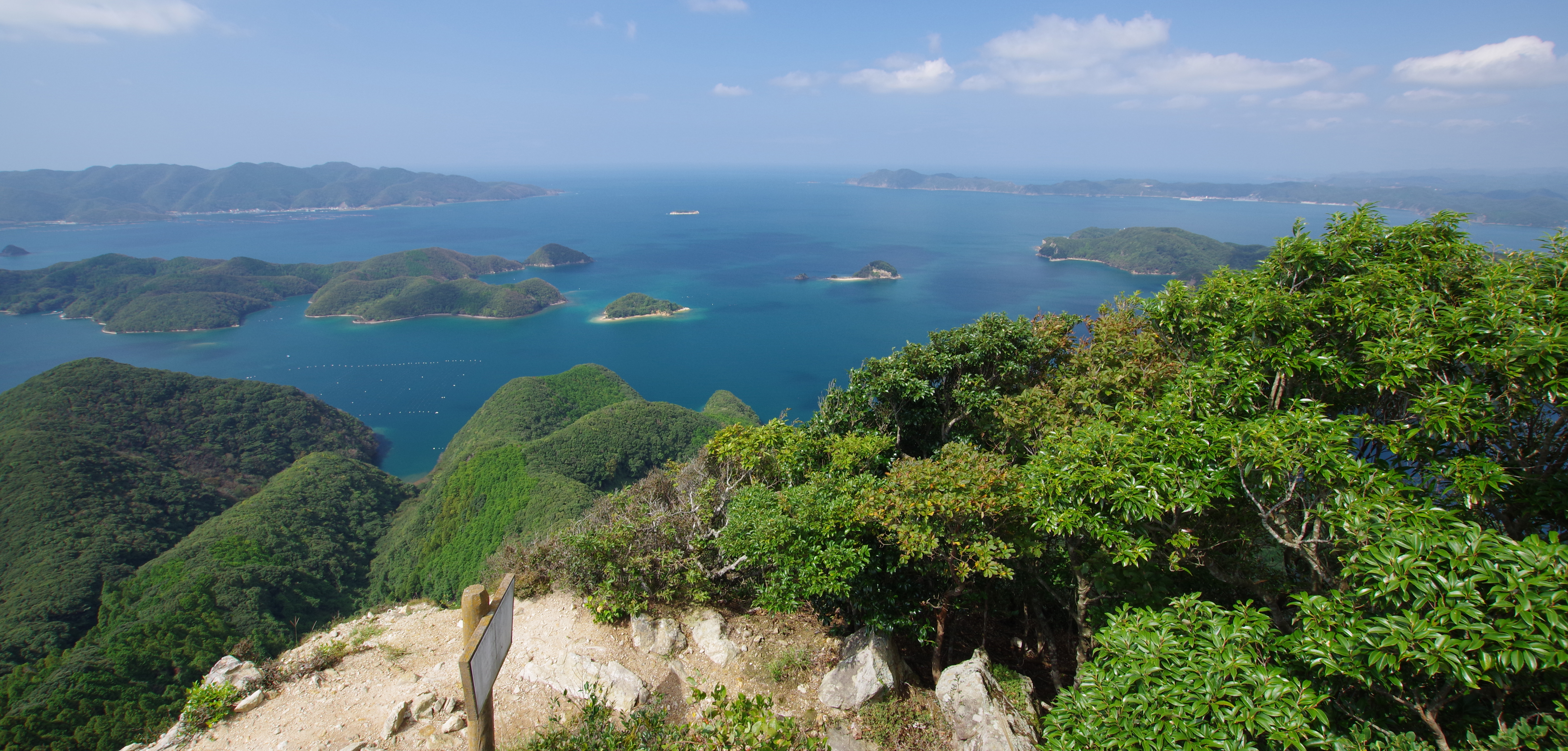
Top of Mount Shiroyama and Asō Bay in Tsushima

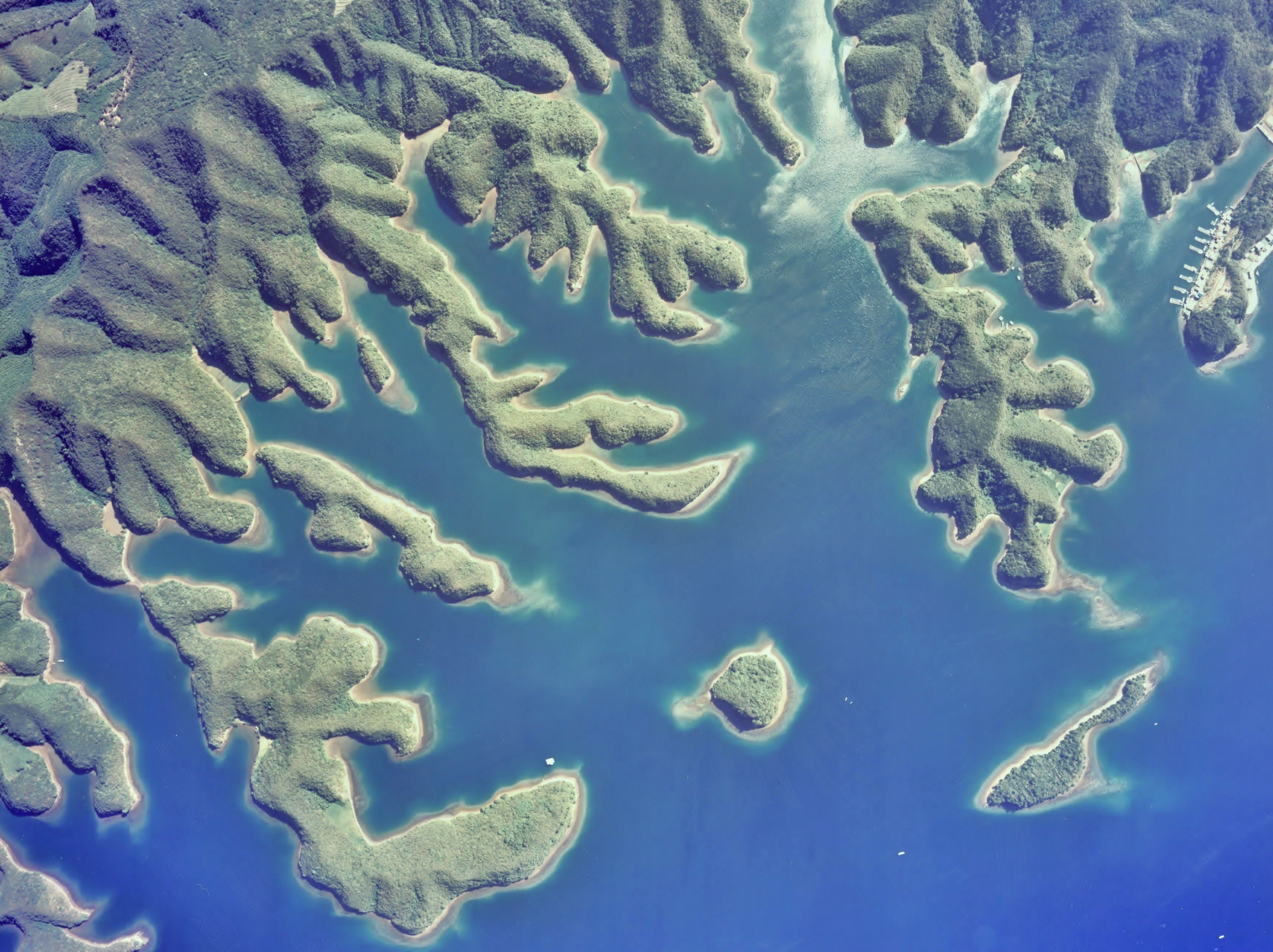
Aerial photo of Asō Bay and around Ochikiri Island (1977)

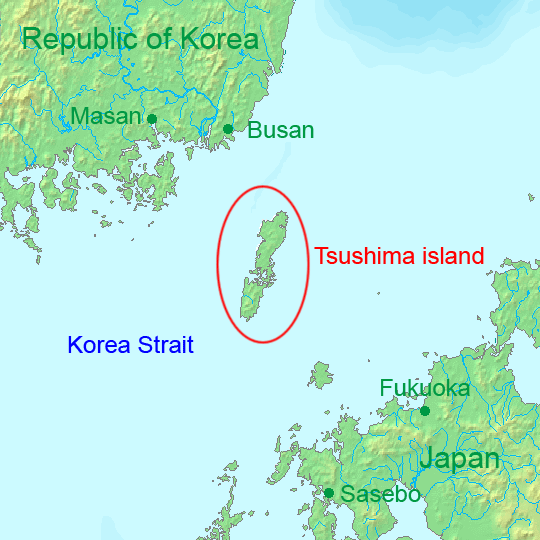
Tsushima, located in Nagasaki Prefecture, Japan

=== Climate ===
Tsushima has a marine humid subtropical climate strongly influenced by monsoon winds. The average temperature is 15.8 °C (60.4 °F), and the average yearly precipitation is 2,132.6 mm. The highest temperature ever recorded on the island is 36.6 °C (97.9 °F), on 20 August 2013, and the lowest −6.8 °C (19.8 °F), in 1895. Throughout most of the year, Tsushima is 1–2 °C cooler than the city of Nagasaki. The island's rainfall is generally higher than that of the main islands of Japan; this is attributed to the difference in their size. Because Tsushima is small and isolated, it is exposed on all sides to moist marine air, which releases precipitation as it ascends the island's steep slopes. Continental monsoon winds carry loess, dust which is a highly fertile mix of clay and sand, from China in the spring and cools the island in the winter.

Climate data for Izuhara, Tsushima (1991−2020 normals, extremes 1886−present)
Month	Jan	Feb	Mar	Apr	May	Jun	Jul	Aug	Sep	Oct	Nov	Dec	Year
Record high °C (°F)	19.8 (67.6)	21.3 (70.3)	24.4 (75.9)	27.8 (82.0)	32.0 (89.6)	33.0 (91.4)	36.9 (98.4)	36.8 (98.2)	34.6 (94.3)	30.2 (86.4)	26.9 (80.4)	22.3 (72.1)	36.9 (98.4)
Mean maximum °C (°F)	15.6 (60.1)	16.9 (62.4)	19.6 (67.3)	23.7 (74.7)	27.4 (81.3)	29.5 (85.1)	32.6 (90.7)	33.3 (91.9)	30.8 (87.4)	26.8 (80.2)	22.6 (72.7)	17.6 (63.7)	33.6 (92.5)
Mean daily maximum °C (°F)	9.2 (48.6)	10.5 (50.9)	13.6 (56.5)	18.1 (64.6)	22.2 (72.0)	24.7 (76.5)	28.3 (82.9)	30.0 (86.0)	26.5 (79.7)	22.3 (72.1)	17.1 (62.8)	11.6 (52.9)	19.5 (67.1)
Daily mean °C (°F)	6.0 (42.8)	6.9 (44.4)	10.0 (50.0)	14.2 (57.6)	18.2 (64.8)	21.3 (70.3)	25.4 (77.7)	26.8 (80.2)	23.4 (74.1)	18.7 (65.7)	13.3 (55.9)	8.0 (46.4)	16.0 (60.8)
Mean daily minimum °C (°F)	2.5 (36.5)	3.2 (37.8)	6.3 (43.3)	10.3 (50.5)	14.4 (57.9)	18.5 (65.3)	23.1 (73.6)	24.2 (75.6)	20.6 (69.1)	15.3 (59.5)	9.6 (49.3)	4.9 (40.8)	12.7 (54.9)
Mean minimum °C (°F)	−2.5 (27.5)	−1.8 (28.8)	0.5 (32.9)	4.7 (40.5)	9.7 (49.5)	14.2 (57.6)	19.1 (66.4)	20.5 (68.9)	16.0 (60.8)	9.2 (48.6)	3.2 (37.8)	−0.8 (30.6)	−3.0 (26.6)
Record low °C (°F)	−7.7 (18.1)	−8.6 (16.5)	−5.2 (22.6)	−1.3 (29.7)	4.8 (40.6)	6.2 (43.2)	12.2 (54.0)	13.6 (56.5)	8.8 (47.8)	0.7 (33.3)	−2.7 (27.1)	−6.4 (20.5)	−8.6 (16.5)
Average precipitation mm (inches)	80.1 (3.15)	94.7 (3.73)	172.3 (6.78)	218.4 (8.60)	241.2 (9.50)	294.4 (11.59)	370.5 (14.59)	326.4 (12.85)	235.5 (9.27)	120.8 (4.76)	100.6 (3.96)	68.0 (2.68)	2,302.6 (90.65)
Average snowfall cm (inches)	0 (0)	0 (0)	0 (0)	0 (0)	0 (0)	0 (0)	0 (0)	0 (0)	0 (0)	0 (0)	0 (0)	0 (0)	0 (0)
Average precipitation days (≥ 1.0 mm)	6.4	6.8	9.0	9.0	8.2	10.8	11.6	10.5	9.0	5.6	6.6	6.3	99.8
Average snowy days (≥ 1 cm)	0	0	0	0	0	0	0	0	0	0	0	0	0
Average relative humidity (%)	61	62	65	68	72	82	83	81	78	70	68	63	71
Mean monthly sunshine hours	147.6	143.5	161.5	183.1	199.2	136.3	136.1	160.4	131.1	161.1	149.0	153.9	1,862.8
Source: Japan Meteorological Agency

== Demographics ==
Tsushima's population is 28,502, with 49.3% male, and 50.7% female. 28,322 are Japanese people, and 150 are foreigners. 14.2% is in the 0–17 age group. 42.7% of its population is in the 18–64 age group. 38.6% is 65 and older. Its population decreased by 9.4% from 2015 to 2020.

== Ecology ==
=== Fauna ===
The island's fauna include leopard cat, Japanese marten, Siberian weasel, and rodents. Otters were discovered to be living on Tsushima in February 2017. Migrating birds that stop over on the island include hawks, harriers, eagles, and black-throated loons. Forests, covering 90% of the island, consist of broad-leafed evergreens, conifers, and deciduous trees including cypress. Honey bees are common, with many used to produce commercial honey. The Tsushima pitviper is a venomous snake endemic to the Tsushima. The islands have been recognised as an Important Bird Area (IBA) by BirdLife International because they support populations of Japanese wood pigeons and Pleske's grasshopper warblers.

Tsushima Reef, located in the bay between Tsushima and Iki Island, is the northernmost coral reef in the world, surpassing the Iki Island reef discovered in 2001. It is dominated by cool-tolerant stony or Scleractinian Favia corals but the observed settling of tropical Acropora coral is expected to provide an ongoing indicator for continuing global warming.

=== Flora ===
The whole island is covered in forest and there are few plains. There are Yoshino cherry and Chionanthus retusus.

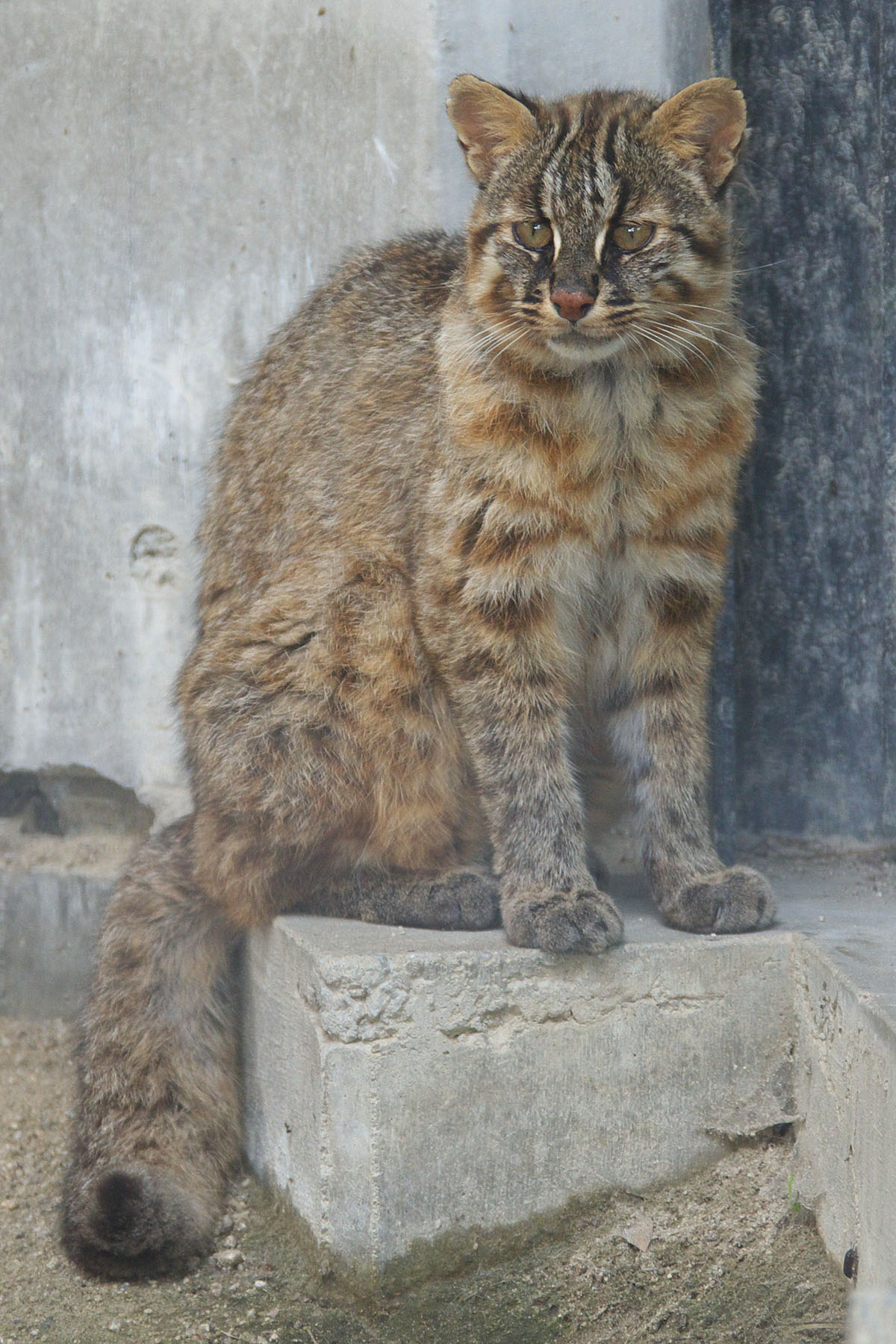
Tsushima leopard cat

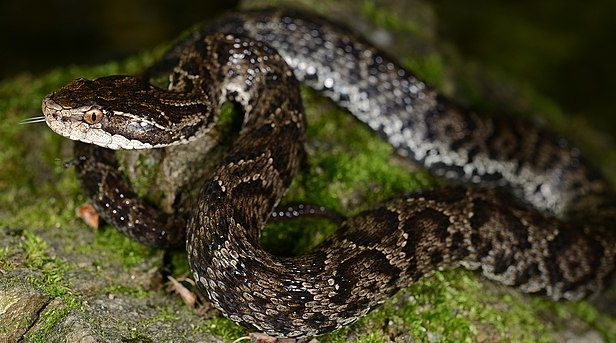
Tsushima pitviper

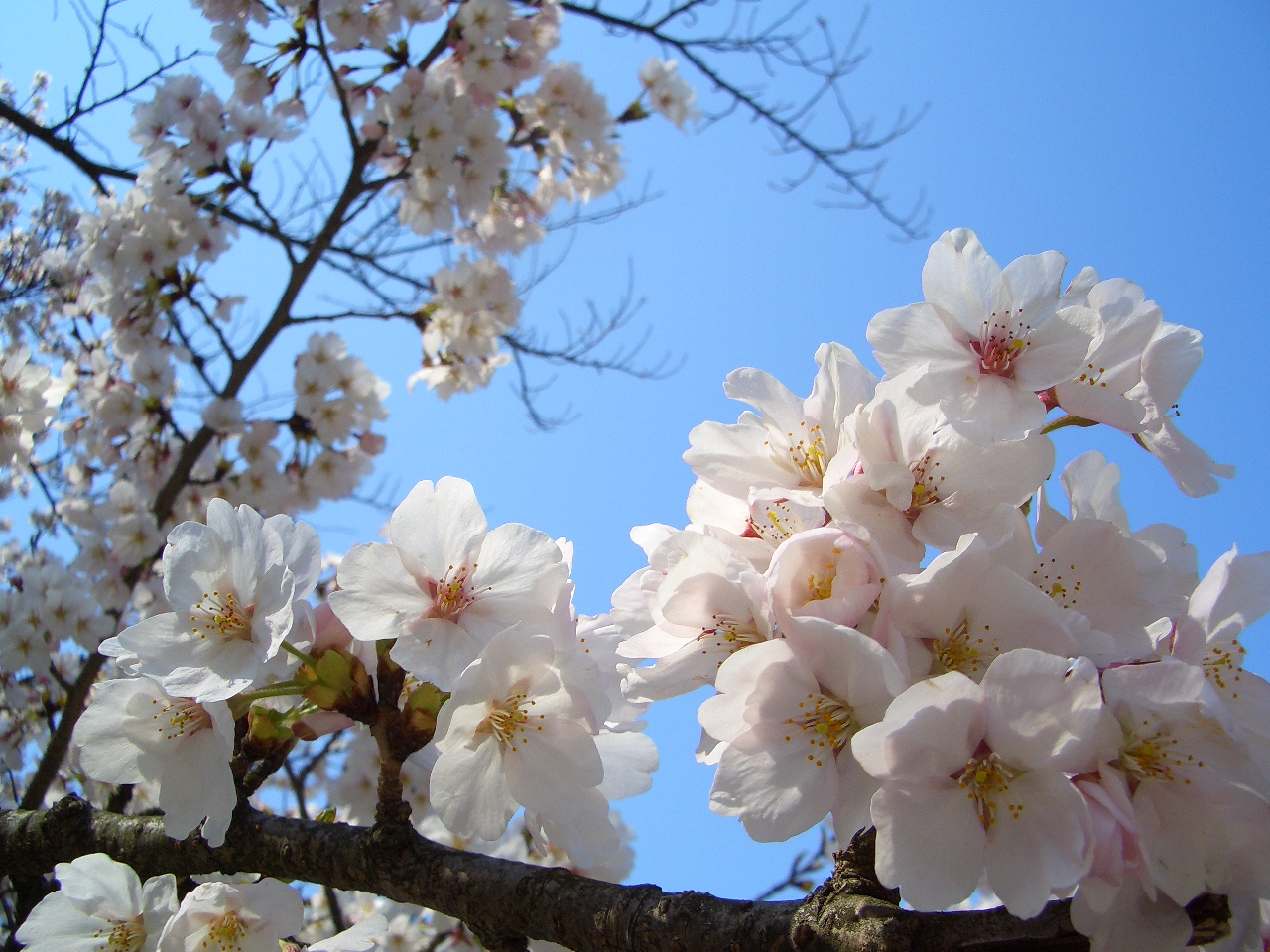
Yoshino cherry

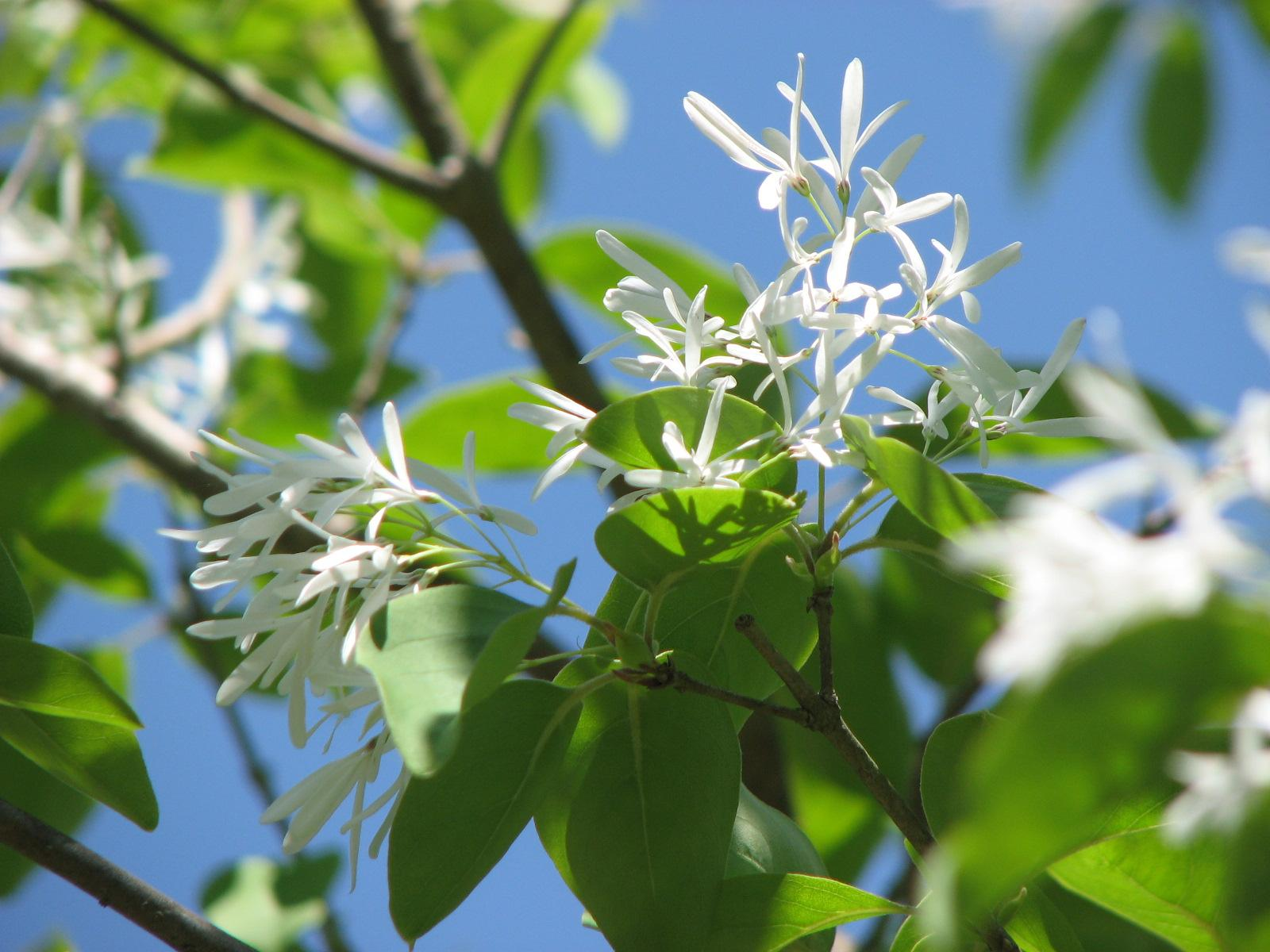
Chionanthus retusus

== Economy ==
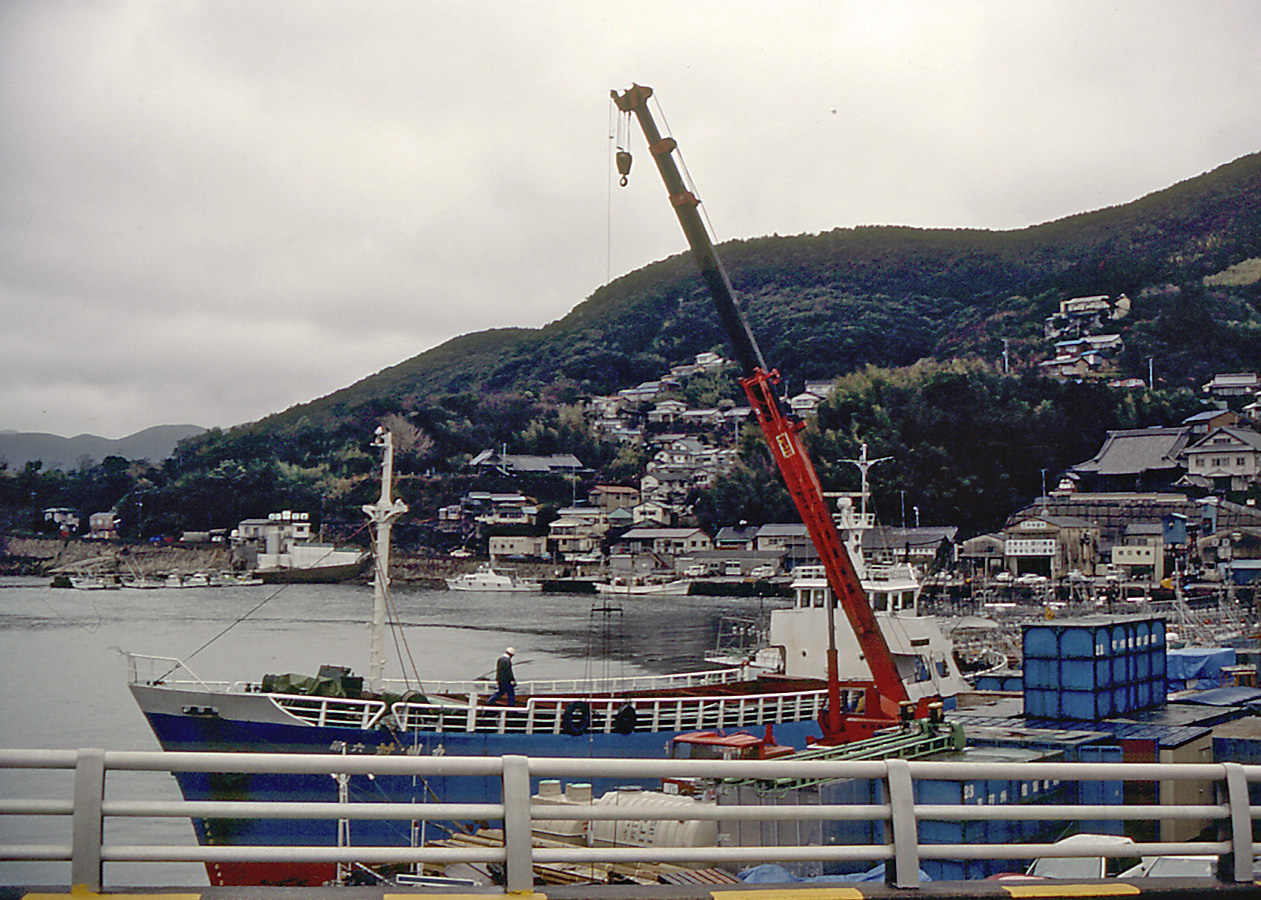
A harbor in the city of Tsushima, Nagasaki Prefecture in 1990

=== Industry ===
According to a 2000 census, 23.9% of the local population is employed in primary industries while 19.7% and 56.4% of the population are employed in secondary and tertiary industries, respectively. Of these economic activities, fishing amounts to 82.6% of the primary industry, with much of it dedicated to catching squid on the eastern coast of the island. The number of employees in the primary industries has been decreasing, while employee growth in the secondary and tertiary industries has been increasing.

=== Tourism ===
Tourism, targeting mainly Koreans, has recently made a great contribution to the islands' economy. The number of Korean tourists to the island increased greatly after the launching of a high-speed ferry service from Busan to the island in 1999. In 2008, 72,349 Koreans visited the island. Due to a drop in the value of the won, the number fell to 45,266 in 2009. Korean tourists generate an estimated ¥2.1 billion in revenue for the local economy and generate about 260 jobs on the island.

The island expected around 200,000 visitors from Korea in 2013, surpassing the number of visitors from within Japan for the first time. However, a summer pageant focused on a historical event involving Korean emissaries was cancelled that same year. In 2018, 90% of visitors to Tsushima were from South Korea; however, there was an 88% decrease (1.7 million fewer visitors) in the number of Korean visitors in 2019. This occurred because of a trade war between Korea and Japan that started in July 2019 when Japan restricted the export of chemical materials relied upon by Korea's large consumer electronics industry. This export restriction was seen to have been a retaliatory act by Japan for a Korean court order that Nippon Steel (Japan's largest steelmaker) pay reparations to the families of Koreans forced into slave labour for the company during World War II. Additionally, the COVID-19 pandemic further reduced and limited tourism.

Tsushima has been gaining popularity as a tourist destination due in large part to the samurai action-adventure stealth game Ghost of Tsushima that was released in 2020, with visitors keen to see some of the locations featured in-game. This includes trying local culinary specialties such as rokube noodles, ishiyaki, tonchan and anago conger eel.

== Tsushima City ==
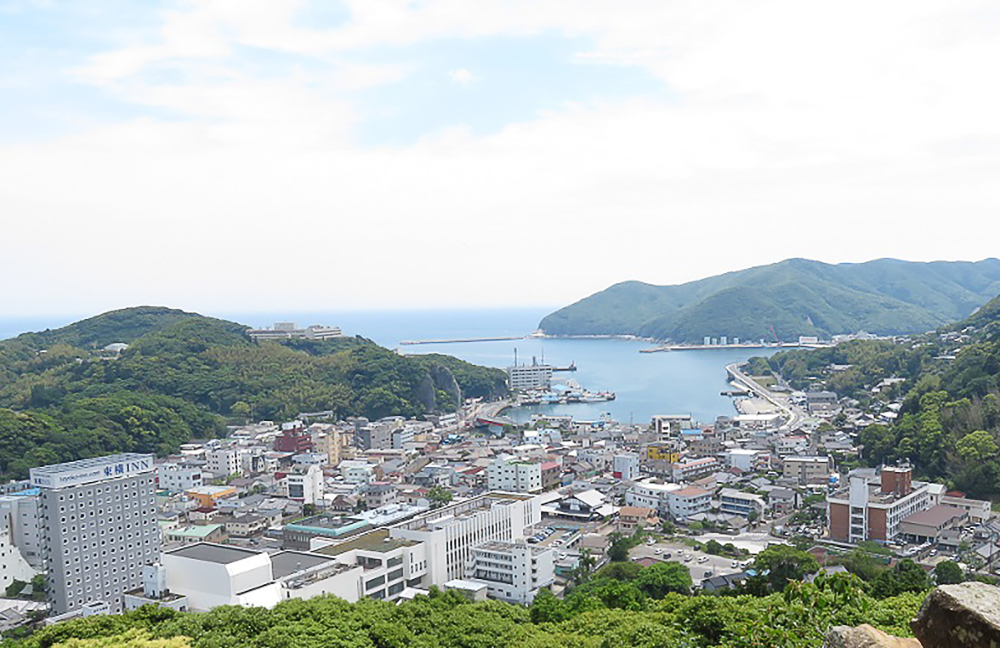
Tsushima city, viewed from Shimizuyama.

Tsushima City was established on 1 March 2004, from the merger of six towns on Tsushima: Izuhara, Mitsushima, and Toyotama (all from Shimoagata District), and Mine, Kamiagata, and Kamitsushima (all from Kamiagata District). It is the only city of Tsushima Subprefecture and encompasses the whole island.

== Transportation ==
Tsushima Airport has flights to Fukuoka Airport (on All Nippon Airways and Oriental Air Bridge) and Nagasaki Airport (Oriental Air Bridge only).

There are ferries to Izuhara port, such as Iki via Hakata port in Fukuoka.

Public buses are utilized by residents as a means of transportation. However, the number of services is limited, and there are no bus stops at tourist destinations, making it unsuitable for sightseeing purposes. Additionally, there is no sightseeing tour bus service available.

== History ==
=== Ancient and classical period ===
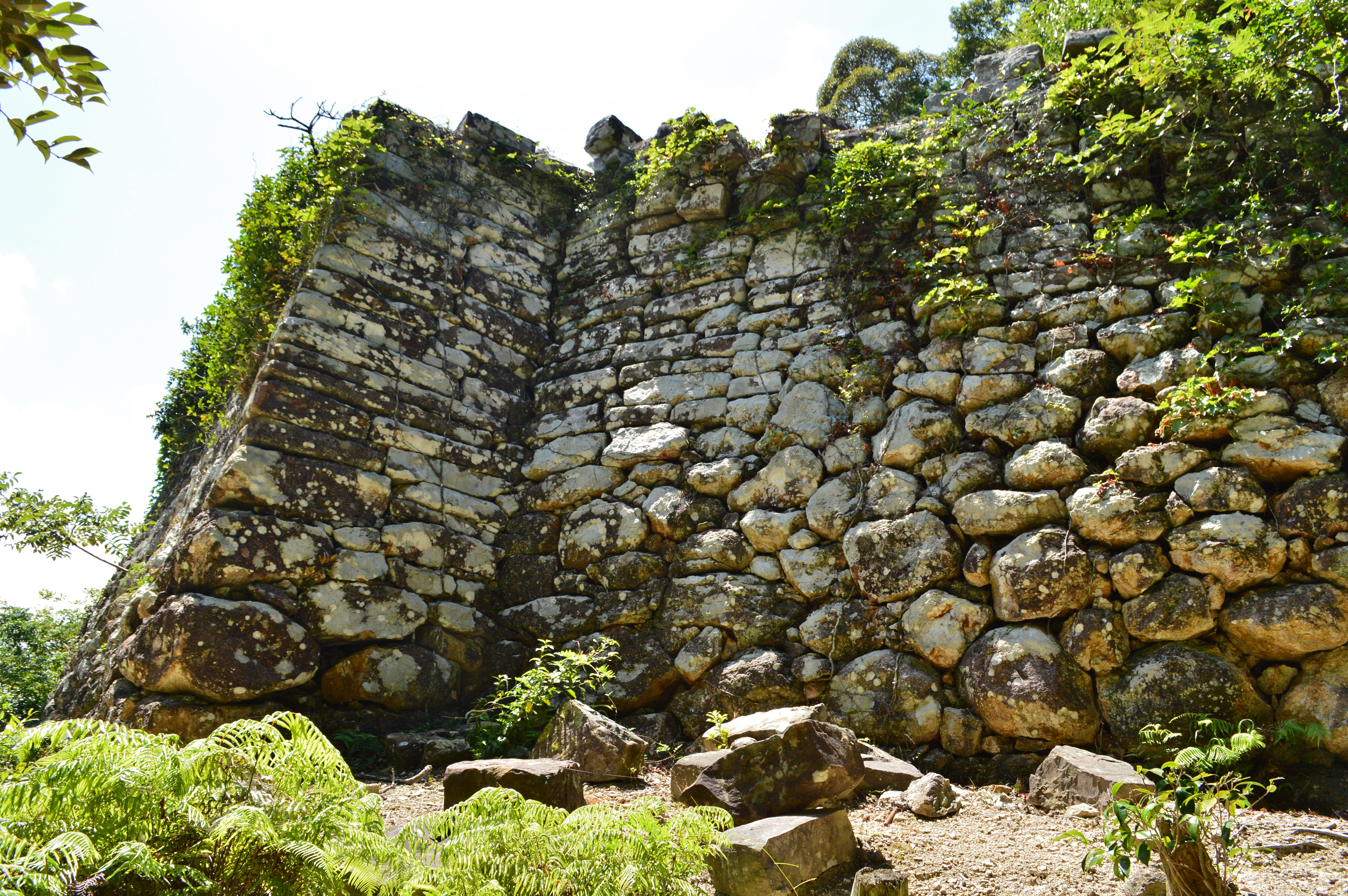
Kaneda Castle ruins

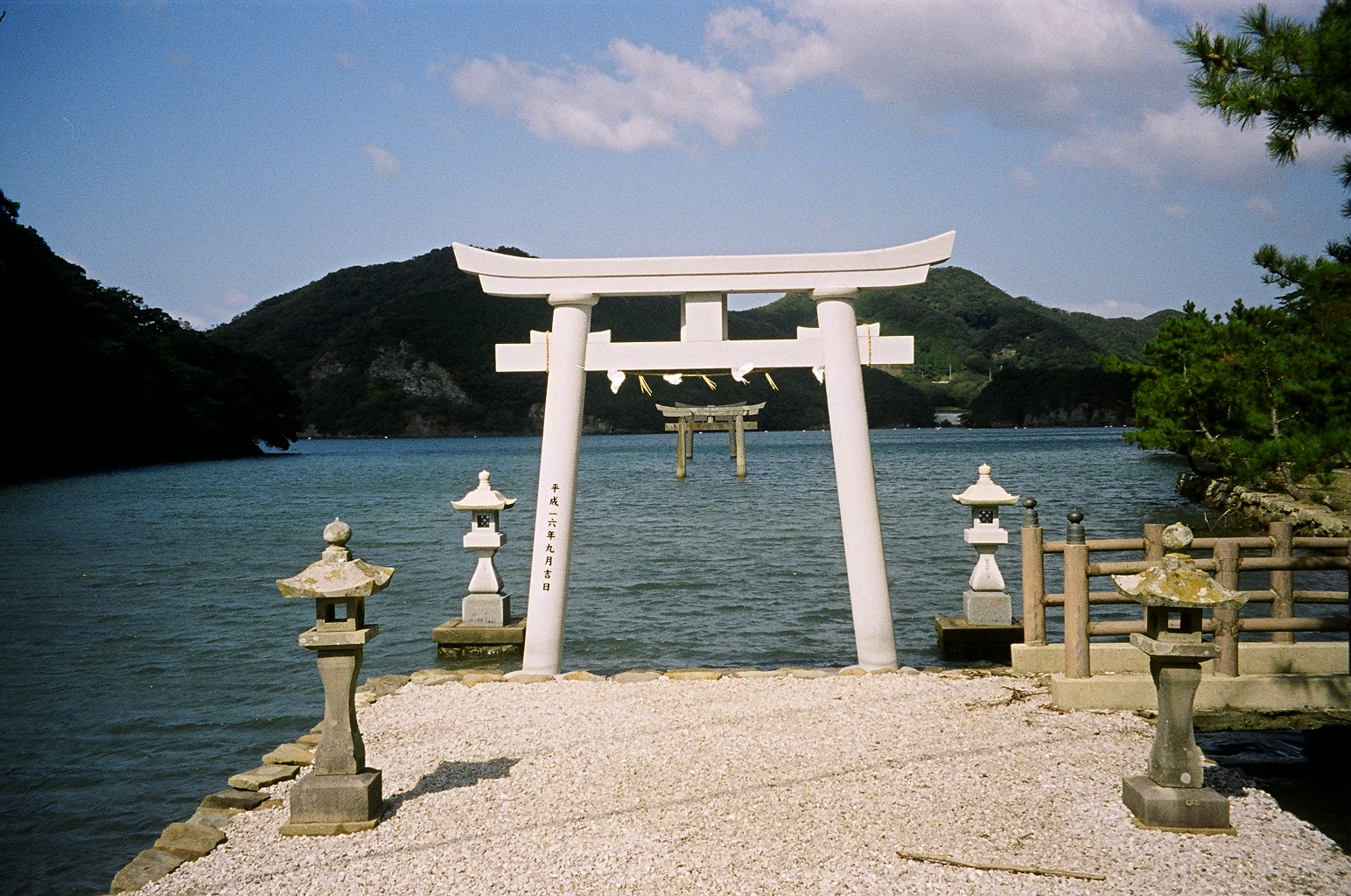
Watazumi Shrine

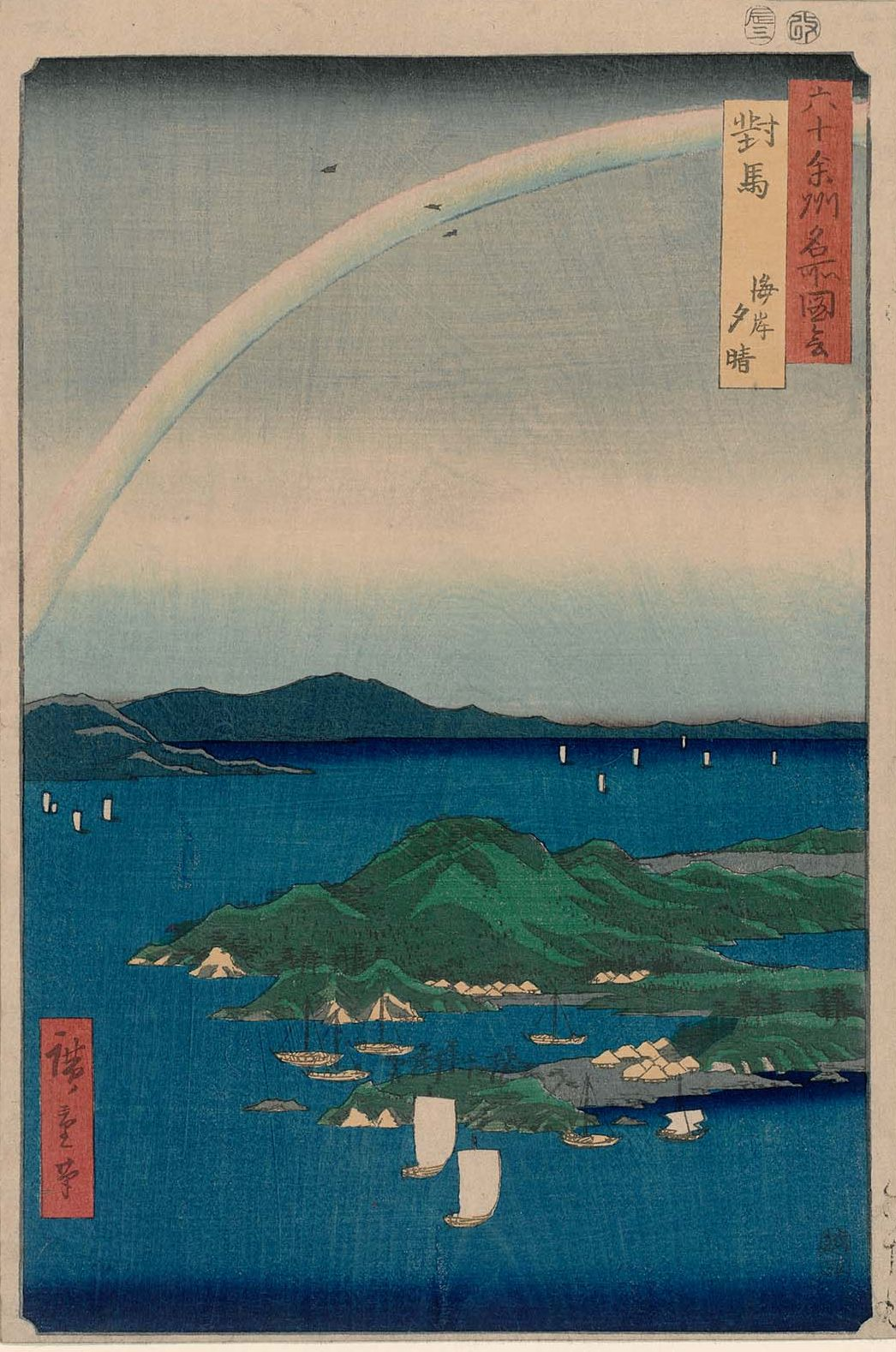
Hiroshige

In Japanese mythology, Tsushima was one of the eight original islands created by the Shinto deities Izanagi and Izanami. Archaeological evidence suggests that Tsushima was already inhabited by settlers from the Japanese archipelago and Korean Peninsula from the Jōmon period to the Kofun period. The Records of the Three Kingdoms, a Chinese historical text, describes a country called Duì hǎi guó (Chinese: 對海國; Japanese pronunciation: Tsuikai-koku) with a population of more than one thousand households, which is commonly identified with Tsushima. It was one of the about 30 that composed the Yamatai union countries. These families exerted control over Iki Island, and established trading links with Yayoi Japan. Since Tsushima had almost no land to cultivate, islanders earned their living by fishing and trading.

Since the beginning of the early sixth century, Tsushima has been an official province of Japan, known as Tsushima Province (today Tsushima, Nagasaki.)

Under the Ritsuryō system, Tsushima became a province of Japan. This province was linked with Dazaifu, the political and economic center of Kyūshū, as well as the central government of Japan. Due to its strategic location, Tsushima played a major role in defending Japan against invasions from the Asian continent and developing trade lines with Baekje and Silla of the Three Kingdoms of Korea. After Baekje, which had been aided by Yamato Japan, was defeated in 663 by Sillan and Tang Chinese forces at the Battle of Baekgang, Japanese border guards were sent to Tsushima and Kaneda Castle was constructed on the island.

Tsushima Province was controlled by officials called Tsushima no kuni no miyatsuko (対馬国造) until the Nara period, and then by the Abiru clan until the middle of the 13th century. The role and title of "Governor of Tsushima" were exclusively held by the Shōni clan for generations. However, since the Shōni actually resided in Kyūshū, it was the Sō clan, known subjects of the Shōni, who actually exerted control over these islands. The Sō clan governed Tsushima until the late 19th century.

=== Feudal period ===
Mongol invasion in 1274

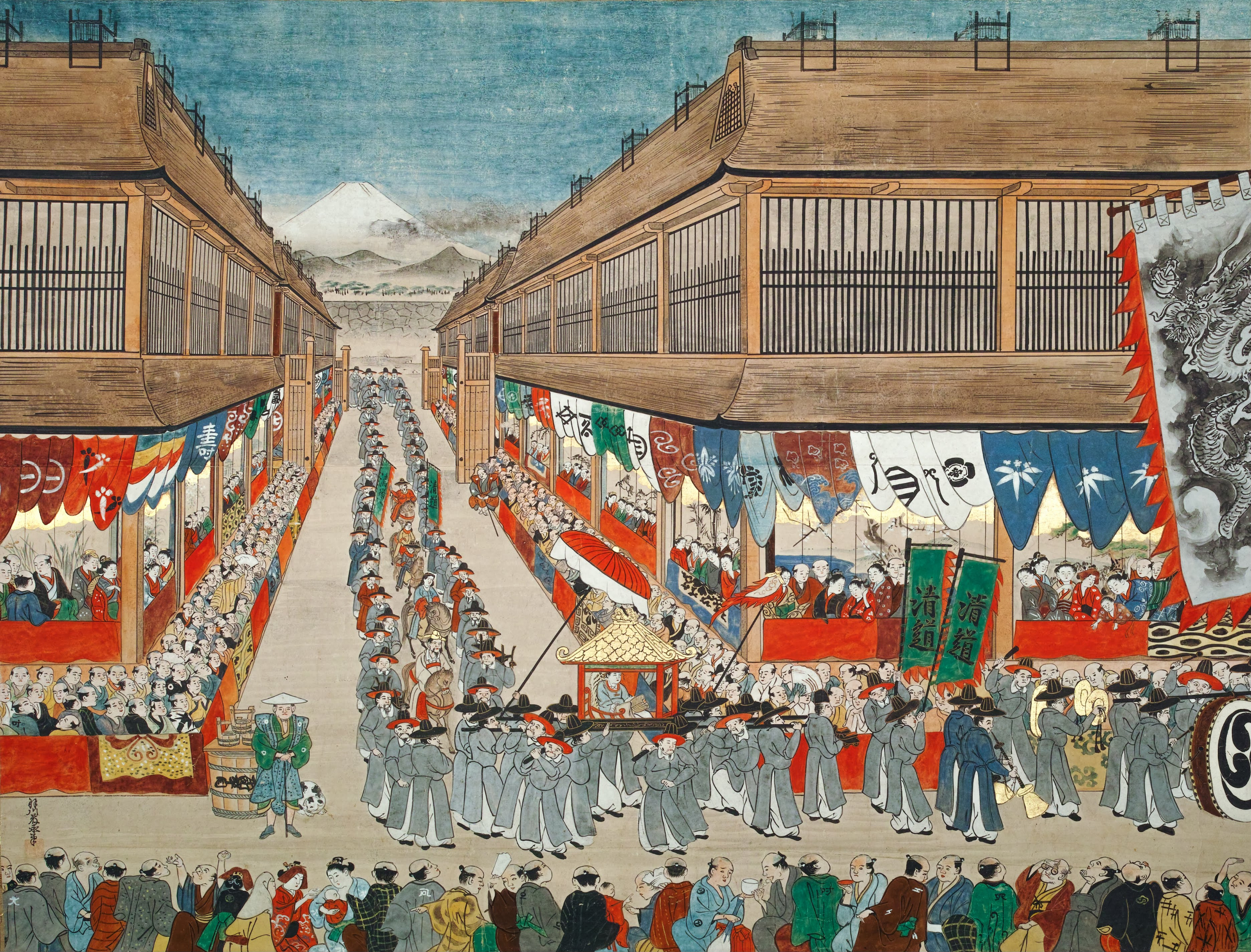
Joseon missions to Japan started in the Muromachi era for about 400 years were welcomed by the Yamato people as seen in this painting of Edo

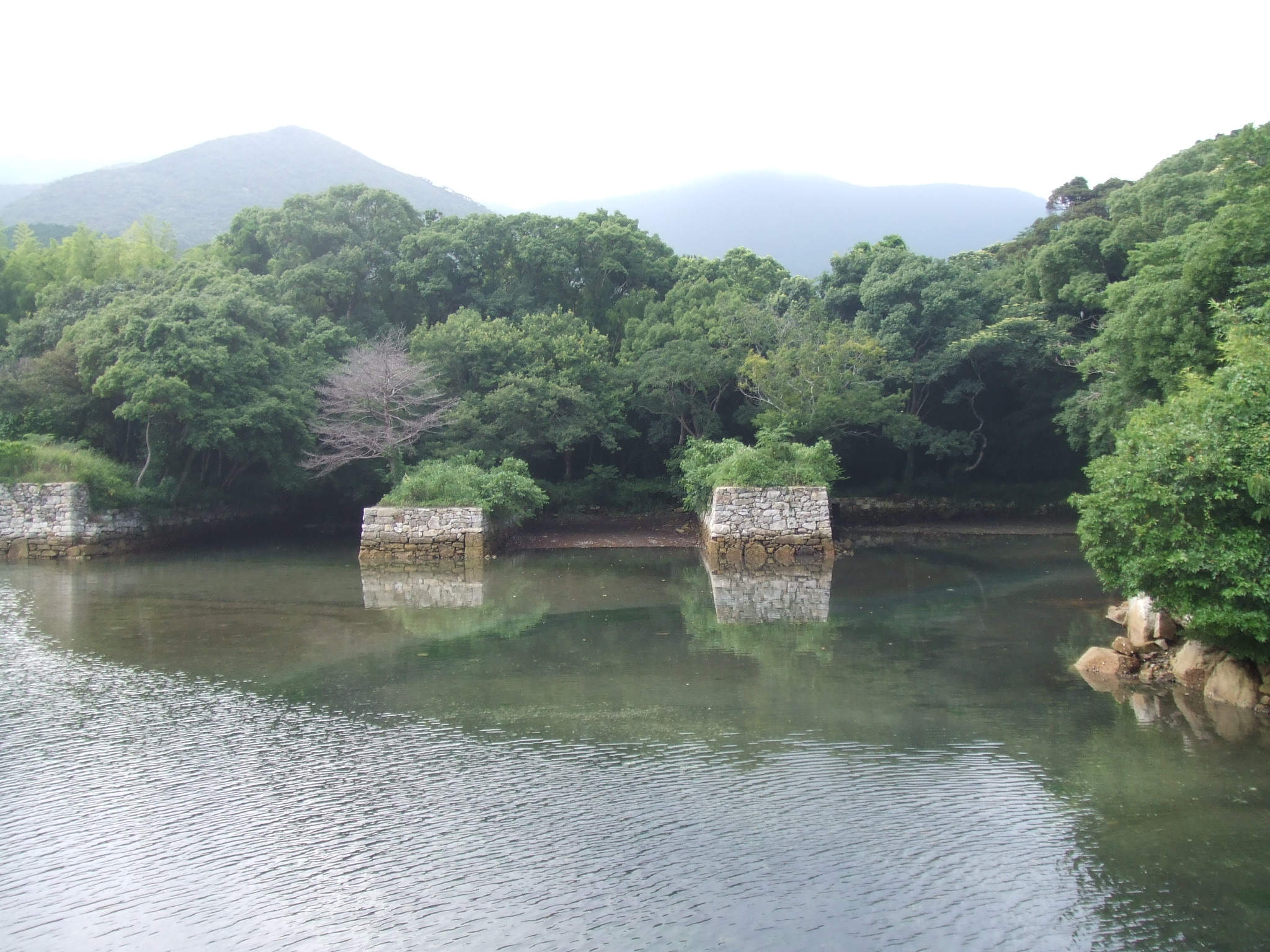
Tsushima domain shipyard site ruins. Built in 1663 CE

Tsushima was an important trade center during this period. After the Toi invasion, private trade started between Goryeo (modern day Korea), Tsushima, Iki Island, and Kyūshū, but halted during the Mongol invasions of Japan between 1274 and 1281. The Goryeosa, a history of the Goryeo dynasty, mentions that in 1274, Korean troops of the Mongol army led by Kim Bang-gyeong killed a great number of people on the islands.

Tsushima became one of the major bases of the Wokou, Japanese pirates, also called wakō, along with Iki and Matsuura. Due to repeated pirate raids, Korea's Goryeo and Joseon at times placated the pirates by establishing trade agreements as well as negotiating with the Ashikaga shogunate and its deputy in Kyūshū and at other times used force to neutralize the pirates. In 1389, General Pak Wi of Goryeo wiped out Wokou on the island of Tsushima.

On 19 June 1419, the recently abdicated king Taejong of Joseon sent general Yi Chongmu to an expedition to Tsushima to clear it of the Wokou pirates, using a fleet of 227 vessels and 17,000 soldiers, known in Japanese as the Ōei Invasion. After suffering casualties in an ambush, the Korean Army retaliated inflicting heavy casualties on the Japanese which later negotiated a ceasefire that led to the withdrawal of the Joseon army on 3 July 1419. In 1443, the Daimyō of Tsushima, Sō Sadamori proposed the Treaty of Gyehae. The number of trade ships from Tsushima to Korea was decided by this treaty, and the Sō clan monopolized the trade with Korea.

In 1510, Japanese traders initiated an uprising against Joseon's stricter policies on Japanese traders from Tsushima and Iki coming to Busan, Ulsan and Jinhae to trade. The So Clan supported the uprising, but it was soon crushed. The uprising later came to be known as the "Disturbance of the Three Ports" (三浦の乱 (Sanbo-No-Ran) in Japan and 삼포왜란 (三浦倭亂, Sampo Waeran) in Korea. Trade resumed under the direction of King Jungjong in 1512, but only under strictly limited terms, and only twenty-five ships were allowed to visit Joseon annually.

In the late 16th century, Japanese leader Toyotomi Hideyoshi united the various feudal lords (daimyō) under his command and in 1587, Hideyoshi confirmed the Sō clan's possession of Tsushima. Sō Yoshitoshi (宗 義智, 1568 – 31 January 1615) was a Sō clan daimyō (feudal lord) of the island domain of Tsushima. Planning to unite all factions with a common cause, Hideyoshi's coalition attacked Joseon Korea, leading to the Japanese invasions of Korea (1592–1598). Tsushima was the main naval base for this invasion, and in continuing support of the war, large numbers of Korean prisoners were transported to Tsushima until Japan's defeat at the hands of the Koreans in 1598.

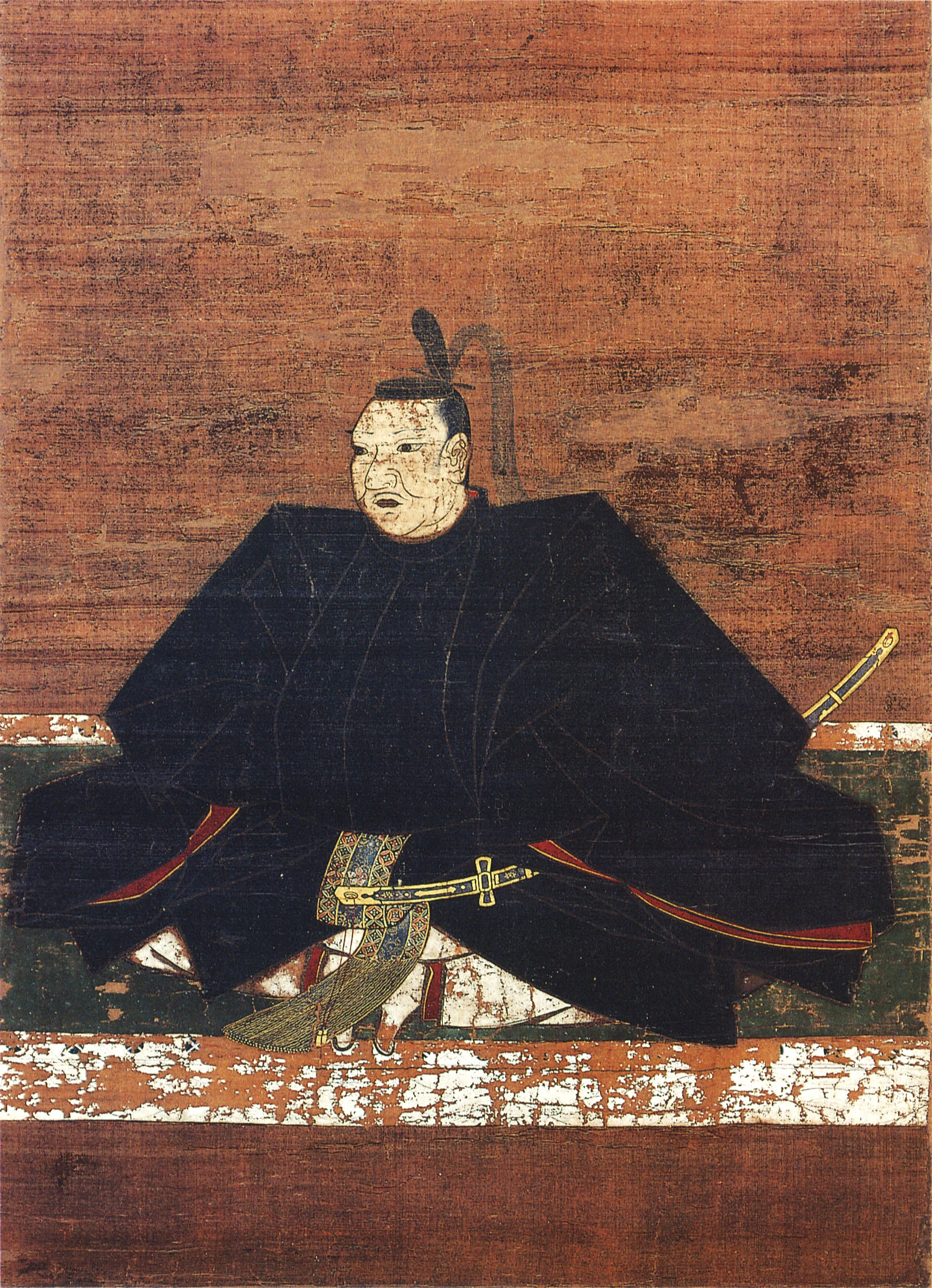
Portrait of Sō Yoshitoshi in 1615

In 1603, Tokugawa Ieyasu established a new shogunate; and Sō Yoshitoshi was officially granted Fuchū Domain (100,000 koku) in Tsushima Province. Following the devastation of the Imjin War (1592–1598), relations between Korea and Japan were gradually restored, with Tsushima playing a crucial role as an intermediary. Tokugawa Ieyasu, aiming to reestablish ties with the Joseon court, utilized the Sō clan of Tsushima to broker negotiations, which culminated in the Kiyu Agreement of 1609. This agreement formally regulated trade and diplomatic exchanges, allowing Tsushima to monopolize contact with Korea on Japan's behalf. The island became economically dependent on Korean grain imports, with some reports suggesting that over half of the rice consumed in Tsushima originated from Korea. The establishment of the Waegwan (Japan House) in Pusan further institutionalized these interactions, serving as a hub for controlled trade and diplomacy. This arrangement persisted throughout the Tokugawa period, solidifying Tsushima's status as both a conduit and a contested space between the two nations.

The Tsushima-Fuchū Domain shipyard was built in 1663 CE. There are still ruins of the shipyard on the island.

After Japan's attempts at conquest failed, peace was re-established between the two nations. Once again, the islands became a port for merchants. Both the Joseon Dynasty and the Tsushima-Fuchū Domain sent their trading representatives to Tsushima, governing trade until 1755.

The island was described by Hayashi Shihei in Sangoku Tsūran Zusetsu, which was published in 1785. It was identified as part of Japan.

In 1811, for cost reduction, representatives of the Tokugawa shogunate met at Tsushima with ambassadors from the Joseon king (Joseon Tongsinsa).

Until the Meiji, Tsushima was a frontier between Japan and Korea, heavily dependent on trade with Korea, with unique institutions/systems of trade which strongly resembled those of Korean, not Japanese, institutions - for instance, a measurement system for the taxation of land in Japan, is determined by the production of kokus of rice. Tsushima had a low production of rice, so it was permitted to use a unique survey system (Kendaka (間高)) by the Tokugawa shogunate. Because it had originated in the China Land Survey System (間尺法), it was similar to the system of Korea - gyeolbu (結負制); Tsushima law resembled Korean law in its calculation of finances. "Unfree labor" or slavery for fixed periods of time, always rare in any form in the rest of Japan, existed as an established institution, often as a form of punishment, in Tsushima as it did in Korea. The Tsushima han owned a 33 hectares (82 acres) place of residence in Busan, according to Murai Shosuke, the Japanese were given the title from the Joseon dynasty called "marginal men", and was responsible for security in this residential area. Lewis also cites the official preparations of Sō Yoshitoshi listing some 1,000 Koreans as guides in preparation for Hideyoshi's invasions of Korea to support a "zone of ambiguous boundary qualities" aspect of Tsushima. The islanders spoke the Tsushima dialect and their daily customs, social structure, and economic interactions were in Japanese, with exception of loanwords from Korean in their dialect.

=== Modern period ===
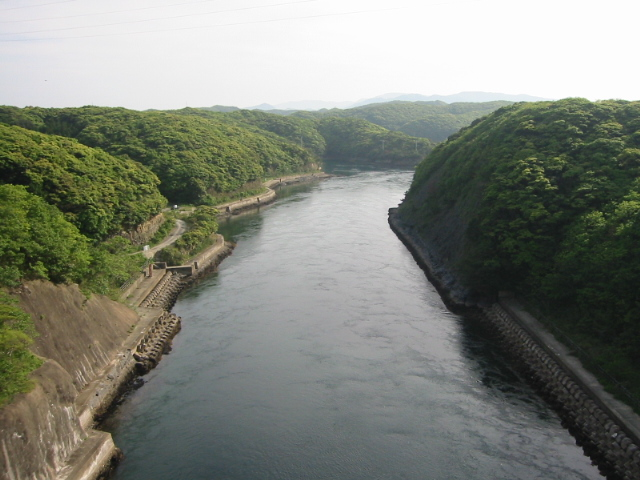
Canal constructed by the Imperial Japanese Navy in 1900

In an episode now known as the Tsushima incident, the Imperial Russian Navy tried to appropriate the island by establishing a base on the island in 1861. In 1860 this plan had been made by Vice Admiral Ivan Likhachev, commanding the Russian squadron in the waters of Japan and the Commander of the Possadnick, Birilev in co-operation with the Russian Consul at Hakodate Goshkevitch. The plan had been discussed with high authorities at St Petersburg who had given the green light to proceed with it. If the plan were to miscarry they would deny all knowledge about it. The Russians were forced to withdraw by Vice Admiral John Hope, commanding the British ships in the waters of Japan on orders of Sir Rutherford Alcock, representing Britain in Japan and the British government. Support at St Petersburg was given by the British Envoy Lord Napier and the Dutch Envoy Baron Gevers

As a result of the abolition of the han system, the Tsushima Fuchu domain became part of Izuhara Prefecture in 1871. In the same year, Izuhara Prefecture was merged with Imari Prefecture, which was renamed Saga Prefecture in 1872. Tsushima was transferred to Nagasaki Prefecture in 1872, and its districts of Kamiagata (上県) and Shimoagata (下県) were merged to form the modern city of Tsushima. This change was part of widespread reforms within Japan which started after 1854. Japan was at this time becoming a modern nation-state and regional power, with widespread changes in government, industry, and education.

After the First Sino-Japanese War ended with the Treaty of Shimonoseki, Japan felt humiliated when the Triple Intervention of the three great powers of Germany, France, and Russia forced it to return the valuable Liaodong Peninsula to China under threat of force. Consequently, the Japanese leadership correctly anticipated that a war with Russia or another Western imperial power was likely. Between 1895 and 1904, the Imperial Japanese Navy blasted the Manzeki-Seto Canal 25 metres (82 feet) wide and 3 metres (9.8 feet) deep; it was later expanded to 40 metres (130 feet) wide and 4.5 metres (14.8 feet) deep through a mountainous rocky isthmus of the island between Asō Bay to the west and Tsushima Strait to the east, technically dividing the island into three islands. Strategic concerns explain the scope and funding of the canal project by Japan during an era when it was still struggling to establish an industrial economy. The canal enabled the Japanese to move transports and warships quickly between their main naval bases in the Seto Inland Sea (directly to the east) via the Kanmon and Tsushima Strait into the Korea Strait or to destinations beyond in the Yellow Sea.

An imperial ordinance in July 1899 established Izuhara, Sasuna, and Shishimi as open ports for trading with the United States and the United Kingdom.

During the Russo-Japanese War in 1905, the Russian Baltic Fleet under Admiral Rozhestvensky, after making an almost year-long trip to East Asia from the Baltic Sea, was crushed by the Japanese under Admiral Togo Heihachiro at the Battle of Tsushima. The Japanese third squadron (cruisers) began shadowing the Russian fleet off the tip of the south island and followed it through the Tsushima Strait where the main Japanese fleet awaited. The battle began at slightly east-northeast of the northern island around midday and ended to its north a day later when the Japanese surrounded the Russian Fleet. Japan won a decisive victory.

From 1948 to 1949, due to the Jeju uprising, and its resulting suppression and massacre by anti-communist Korean forces, thousands of Jeju residents fled to Japan via Tsushima.

In 1950, the South Korean government asserted sovereignty over the island based on "historical claims". Korea-US negotiations about the Treaty of San Francisco made no mention of Tsushima. After this, the status of Tsushima as an island of Japan was re-confirmed. While the South Korean government has since relinquished claims on the island, some Koreans (including some members of the Korean parliament) have periodically attempted to dispute the ownership of the island.

In 1973, one of the transmitters for the OMEGA-navigation system was built on Tsushima. It was dismantled in 1998.

Today, Tsushima is part of Nagasaki Prefecture, Japan. On 1 March 2004, the six towns on the island – Izuhara, Mitsushima, Toyotama, Mine, Kamiagata, and Kamitsushima – were merged to create the city of Tsushima. About 700 Japan Self-Defense Forces personnel are stationed on the island to watch the local coastal and ocean areas. The island is also the site of dozens of lighthouses as well as smaller beacons.

== Landmarks ==
- Ofunaeato Ruins: Created in 1663, these ruins consist of five docks located in a deep inlet beyond Izuhara Port. This excellent harbor was utilized for Korean trade and the alternate attendance system (Sankin-kōtai) during the Edo period. The embankment's stone construction has retained its original form, earning it designation as a historical site by Nagasaki Prefecture.
- Kaneda Castle Ruins: The ruins of a mountain castle, constructed in 667 by Emperor Tenji on Jouyama (elevation 276 meters), are recognized as a national special historic site. Leveraging the steep natural terrain, the construction includes extensive stone ramparts encircling the site, covering approximately 2.2 to 2.8 kilometers. The remains indicate it was a residence for border guards (conscripted from what is now the Kanto region to defend the coasts of Kyushu). For more details, refer to the Battle of Baekgang.
- Izuhara Town Samurai Residence Street: In Izuhara Town, which functioned as the castle town of the Tsushima domain until the Edo period, ancient stone walls still stand. A statue of Sō Yoshitomo, the first lord of the Tsushima domain, is also present.
- Banshō-in: The family temple of the Sō clan, who ruled Tsushima, was built in 1615 by Sō Yoshinari, the second lord of Tsushima (and 20th head of the Sō family), for the posthumous welfare of the first lord, Sō Yoshitomo. Notable for its Momoyama-style vermilion gate, the grand stone pagodas are recognized as one of Japan's three great cemetery sites, alongside those in Kanazawa City for the Maeda clan and in Hagi City for the Mōri clan, and are also designated as a national historic site. Inside the hall, there is a set of three sacred vessels gifted by the king of Korea and a large memorial tablet from the Tokugawa shoguns. Climbing the 132 stone steps, known as "Hyakugangi," leads to a row of large graves. There are three cedar trees said to be 1200 years old, the oldest cedars in Tsushima.
- Watatsumi Shrine: Dedicated to Hikohohodemi no Mikoto and Toyotama-hime no Mikoto, this shrine is a sea palace linked with ancient Dragon Palace legends. Of the five torii gates in front of the main hall, two are submerged at high tide. Along the back approach, an ancient ritual site, Iwakura, is located.

== Cultural facilities ==
- Tsushima Museum: Opened in April 2022, this comprehensive museum encompasses nature, culture, history, and art. It shares its location with the Nagasaki Prefecture Tsushima History Research Center. Visitors have the opportunity to explore Tsushima's history from ancient to modern times through approximately 500 items on permanent display, including archaeological finds from sites on Tsushima, Buddhist art, and materials related to the Korean envoys.
- Tourist Information Center Fureai-dokoro Tsushima: Located in the heart of Tsushima, in Izuhara Town Imayashiki, this tourist information center is housed in a Japanese-style building constructed from Tsushima-produced timber and Japanese tiles, replicating the "Nagaya-mon"(長屋門) of the Furukawa family, retainers of the Tsushima domain. The tourist information booth features exhibitions that offer an overview of Tsushima's history and nature. Local products and souvenirs produced by city businesses are sold here, and there is a dining area where visitors can sample Tsushima's specialties. The facility also includes a bus terminal and public restrooms.
- Mine Town Historical and Folklore Museum: Focuses on archaeological and folklore materials excavated from the Mine Town area, including rare "deer whistles" essential for studying hunting culture, of which only two examples exist nationwide.
- Toyotama Town Local Museum: Exhibits archaeological materials and bronzeware excavated from Jomon to Kofun period sites located in Toyotama Town, situated in the central part of Tsushima.
- Tsushima Korean Envoys Historical Museum: Dedicated to the activities of the Korean envoys sent to Japan and their interactions with Tsushima, including explanations and exhibits on the "Records of the Korean Envoys" registered in UNESCO's "Memory of the World."

== Historical dispute ==
Tsushima is administered by Nagasaki Prefecture. The South Korean city of Changwon also asserts ownership of the island, calling it Daemado (Korean pronunciation: [te:ma.do]; Korean: 대마도; Hanja: 對馬島; RR: Daemado; MR: Taemado), the Korean reading of the characters used in the Japanese name (Kyūjitai Japanese: 對馬).

Archaeological evidence suggests that Tsushima was already inhabited by settlers from the Japanese archipelago from the Jōmon period (14,000 BCE) to the Kofun period (300 CE). Also, according to the Sanguo Zhi in the 3rd century Tsushima was Tsuikai-koku and one of the 30 that composed the Yamataikoku union countries (邪馬台国). This island, as Tsushima Province, has been ruled by Japanese governments since the Nara period (710 CE). According to the Korean history book Samguk Sagi written in 1145, Tsushima is ruled by the Japanese from CE 400.

On 19 June 1419, the Ōei Invasion of King Sejong of Joseon was retracted. He sent general Yi Chongmu on an expedition to Tsushima to clear it of the Wokou pirates, using a fleet of 227 vessels and 17,000 soldiers. The Joseon invaders suffered casualties in an ambush and the Korean Army negotiated a ceasefire and withdrew on 3 July 1419. Afterwards, in diplomatic exchanges, the lords of Tsushima would be granted exclusive trading privileges with Joseon in exchange for maintaining control and order of pirate threats originating from the island which was the very reason for the original expedition.

The Tsushima Fuchu domain became part of Izuhara Prefecture in 1871. In the same year, Izuhara Prefecture merged with Imari Prefecture, which was renamed Saga Prefecture on 29 May 1872. The island provinces of Tsushima and Iki were merged with the western half of the former province of Hizen and became modern-day Tsushima, Nagasaki Prefecture in 1872.

The South Korean government made a claim in 1948, but it was rejected by US Gen. Douglas MacArthur, the then-Supreme Commander of the Allied Powers (SCAP) in 1949. On 19 July 1951, the South Korean government agreed that the earlier demand for Tsushima had been dropped by the South Korean government with regard to the Japanese peace treaty negotiations.

The status of Tsushima as an island of Japan was re-confirmed in 1965.

In 2008, Yasunari Takarabe, incumbent Mayor of Tsushima rejected the South Korean territorial claim: "Tsushima has always been Japan. I want them to retract their wrong historical perception. It was mentioned in the Gishiwajinden (魏志倭人伝) [a chapter of volume 30 of Book of Wei in the Chinese Records of the Three Kingdoms] as part of Wa. It has never been and cannot be a South Korean territory."

== Tourist sites ==
Characterized by the steep mountains epitomized by the sacred Mt. Shiratake, along with the rias coastline of Aso Bay, where inlets extend deep into the island. These areas have virgin forests and several endemic species. Additionally, they have a rich historical and cultural background, serving as a midpoint for diplomatic missions between Japan and Korea.

- Mt. Shiratake: With an elevation of 519 meters, has long been revered as a sacred peak and is recognized as one of Kyushu's Hundred Famous Mountains, symbolizing Tsushima. Despite the one-way distance of 2 km, the steep ascent from nearly sea level provides exceptional views. It has been designated as a national natural monument, thanks to its valuable primeval forest and the mix of continental and Japanese plants.
- Tategami Rock: A gigantic monolith located between the east pier of the Izuhara district, where passenger terminals are situated, and the urban area of Izuhara. Named for its resemblance to a standing turtle, it was originally called Tategami Rock (Standing God Rock), regarded as a landing place for gods, and is the site of the Sumiyoshi Shrine, dedicated to the god of maritime safety.
- Jouyama: With an elevation of 276 meters, this rock mass extends into Aso Bay, spanning the center of Tsushima. The trail from the base to the summit covers approximately 2.4 km. In 667, the ancient fortress of Kaneda Castle was built here. It was also fortified during the Russo-Japanese War, with army artillery units stationed for border defense. The ascent takes about 50 minutes one way and 40 minutes to return.
- Aso Bay: A typical rias coastline featuring a complex network of inlets and countless islands, the entire area is designated as the Iki-Tsushima Quasi-National Park, known for its scenery. Recently, sea kayaking has gained popularity in the area. Additionally, the bay supports aquaculture industries, including pearl and yellowtail farming.
- Eboshi-dake Observatory: Near the summit of Eboshi-dake (elevation 176m), a road provides access close to the peak, and climbing 145 steps offers a 360-degree view of the magnificent rias coastline of Asaji Bay. The intricate coastline and numerous islands, under favorable weather conditions, may even afford a glimpse of the Korean mainland.
- Mankan Bridge: An arch bridge connects Kami-shima and Shimo-shima, spanning the area between Asaji Bay and Miura Bay. With the rising sentiment for war against Russia, the Japanese Navy opened a canal called Mankan Seto in 1901 to deploy torpedo boats into the Tsushima Strait. The bridge crosses this excavated canal.
- Takuzudama Shrine (多久頭魂神社): has long been considered a bastion of “Tendo faith”. Uniquely, the shrine lacks a worship hall and main sanctuary; instead, the mountain itself is revered as the deity, with piled stones forming a boundary around the sacred area, preserving an ancient form of ritual practice. From the mid-Heian period, it was known as "Tsutsuotera" due to the syncretism of Shinto and Buddhism. However, following the Meiji era's decree separating Shinto and Buddhism, it was designated as Takuzudama Shrine and is now enshrined at its current location.
  - Tsushima Buddha Statue Theft Incident (Japanese: 対馬仏像盗難事件, Korean: 쓰시마 불상 도난 사건) refers to an event in 2012, where two statues designated as Important Cultural Properties, among other items, were stolen from three shrines/temples (including Takuzudama Shrine) in Tsushima City, Nagasaki Prefecture, Japan, by a group of Korean thieves. A local Korean court made a decision that effectively refused the return of the stolen statues to Japan, and while one has been returned, the other remains unrecovered. The Korean government appealed this decision, and the Supreme Court ultimately upheld a ruling in favor of Japan's claims.
- Kaijin Shrine (カイジンジンジャ): is said to have originated when Empress Jingu, on her return from the conquest of the three Korean kingdoms, deposited eight banners in Kamigata Gun-mineco in Tsushima as proof of her subjugation of Silla. The shrine was once known as Hachiman Hongu and Kamitsu Hachimangu, but in 1870 it was renamed Watatsumi Shrine. The following year, in 1871, the enshrined deity was changed from Hachiman to Toyotama-hime, and the shrine's name was changed to Kaijin Shrine, which remains its name to this day.
- Komoda Beach: The beach that became the first invasion point during the Mongol invasions of Japan (“Genkō”) in 1274, carried out by the Mongol Empire (Yuan) and its vassal state, Goryeo. An invading force of a large fleet comprising 900 ships landed here, and the defending samurai, led by the local governor Sukekuni and 80 others, engaged in battle and all were killed in action. A monument stands on the beach, and the nearby Komoda Beach Shrine is dedicated to them.
- Ofunakoshi Bridge: The bridge spans the Ofunakoshi Seto, a channel carved in 1671 by Sō Yoshizane, the third lord of the Tsushima domain, to connect the Korea Strait with the Tsushima Strait. Before its construction, it is said that ships had to be pulled over hills. The project, completed in about half a year, required the labor of 35,000 people.
- Meboro Dam Equestrian Park: An equestrian park that breeds Tsushima's native horse, the Tsushima horse. Visitors can tour the facility and experience horseback riding.
- Tsushima Wildlife Conservation Center: A facility operated by the Ministry of the Environment, opened in 1997, is dedicated to the research and conservation of endangered wildlife, such as the Tsushima leopard cat, and to promoting understanding and interest in wildlife conservation. Locally known as the “Yamaneko Center”, it is beloved by the community. The Tsushima leopard cat on display is named “Kanata”, as decided by a public vote.

== Local cuisine and specialities ==
Local cuisine often features seafood and crops that can be cultivated in the lean soil of the island, which have been passed down through generations.

- Iriyaki: A pot dish characterized by a sweet soy sauce-based seasoning, using chicken or fish, traditionally prepared for ceremonies, community events, and still commonly enjoyed as a feast during the New Year and other occasions. In regions where fishing is prevalent, it is considered a fisherman's dish.
- Rokubee (ろくべえ): A dish made from 100% sweet potato traditional Tsushima preserved food "sendango" noodles, served with a chicken broth soup.
- Tsushima Soba: Soba noodles that are said to have been introduced to Japan from China via Tsushima. Tsushima's soba, a small-grained variety close to the original species, is known for its firm texture and subtle bitterness. Due to limited arable land, soba cultivation on mountain slopes is prevalent, making it a staple food on the island.
- Stone Grilling: A local cuisine where seafood fresh enough to be eaten raw is deliberately grilled on a special type of rock called quartz porphyry. Originally, this hearty fisherman's dish was eaten by fishermen warming themselves on the beach.
- Conger Eel (アナゴ): The Tsushima Warm Current creates excellent fishing grounds, making Tsushima's seafood exceptional. Tsushima is among the top in Japan for conger eel catches. In addition to simmered eel, grilled white eel, and fried eel, fresh eel can also be enjoyed as sashimi at local restaurants.

== Hot springs ==
Although Tsushima is not a volcanic island, there are four day-trip hot spring facilities available.

- Kamitsushima Hot Spring "Nagisa no Yu/ 渚の湯" (Kamitsushima Town): A weak alkaline spring. From the windows of the hot spring facility, visitors can enjoy views of the open sea.
- Mine Hot Spring "Hotaru no Yu/ ほたるの湯" (Mine Town): A spring where the water flows directly from the source, featuring odorless simple spring water.
- Shinju no Yu Hot Spring (Mitsushima Town): An alkaline simple spring known for its effectiveness against neuralgia and sensitivity to cold.
- Yutari Land (Mitsushima Town): A complex facility featuring a large communal bath, family baths, a pool, and a restaurant, which reopened in December 2023 after renovation.

== Notable people ==
- Misia (born 1978), Japanese singer-songwriter
- Tsuyoshi Shinjo (born 1972), Japanese baseball player
- Sō Yoshitoshi (1568–1615), Sō clan daimyō of Tsushima
- Tsushimanada Yakichi (1887–1933), Japanese sumo wrestler

== Popular culture ==
Tsushima is the setting for the PlayStation 4 game Ghost of Tsushima, released by Sucker Punch Productions in 2020. It gives a fictionalized account of the Mongol invasion of 1274. In response to the popularity of the game, the Nagasaki Prefecture used it to promote tourism to Tsushima. After a typhoon damaged a Shinto torii gate on the island in September 2020, fans of the game helped raise money to restore it. The creative leads of the game, Nate Fox and Jason Connell, were named as tourism ambassadors to the island in March 2021, as those "who has spread the name and history of Tsushima through their works". On March 25, 2021, Sony Pictures and PlayStation Productions announced the development of a film adaptation of the game.

== See also ==
- History of Japan
  - Japanese invasions of Korea (1592–1598)
  - Oei Invasion
- Korea Strait
- Tsushima Subprefecture
