= Eupithecia ancillata =

Scientific classification
- Kingdom: Animalia
- Phylum: Arthropoda
- Clade: Pancrustacea
- Class: Insecta
- Order: Lepidoptera
- Family: Geometridae
- Genus: Eupithecia
- Species: E. ancillata

Binomial name
- Eupithecia ancillata Mironov & Galsworthy, 2004

Species of moth

Eupithecia ancillata is a moth in the family Geometridae. It is known from central China (Shaanxi), Korea, and Japan (Tsushima Island).

The wingspan is about 15–19 mm.
