= Shimono =

Shimono (written: 下野 or 下農) is a Japanese surname. Notable people with the surname include:

- Atsushi Shimono (下野 淳, born 1988), Japanese footballer
- Hashiru Shimono (下農 走, born 1997), Japanese badminton player
- Hiro Shimono (下野 紘, born 1980), Japanese voice actor and singer
- Sab Shimono (born 1937), American actor

== See also ==
- Shimono-shima, the southern end of Tsushima Island, Nagasaki Prefecture, Japan
