= Korean claim to Tsushima Island =

Historical territorial dispute between Korea and Japan

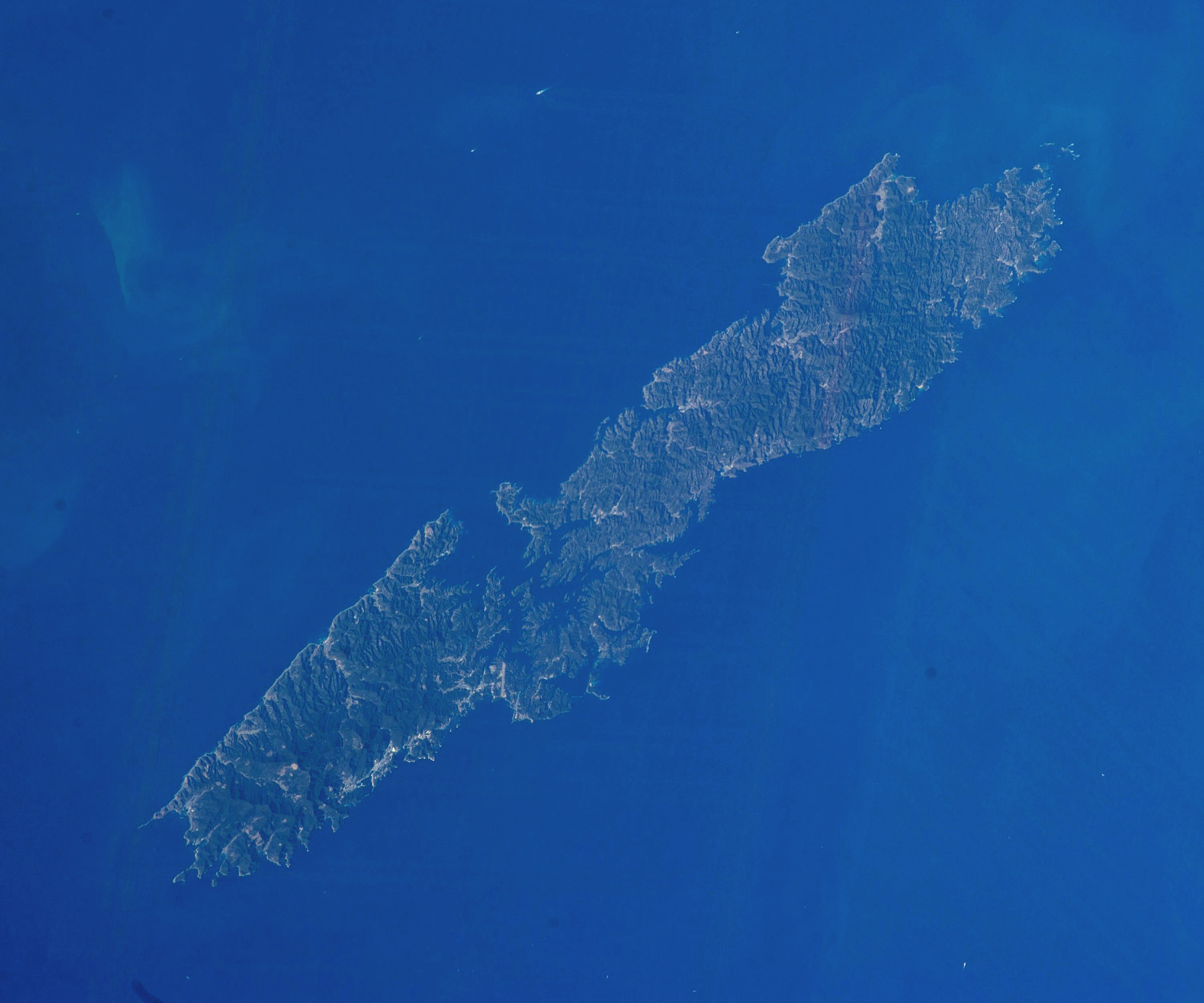
Satellite photo of Tsushima (2013)

Some past and recent Koreans have claimed that Tsushima (対馬), a large island in the Korea Strait between the Korean Peninsula and the Japanese island of Kyushu. The island, which is known as Daemado (대마도) in Korean, has been controlled by Japan since at least the 8th century and is currently not officially claimed in any way by the governments of either South Korea or North Korea. However, some historic Korean governments have claimed that the island is rightfully theirs, and there have also been multiple unofficial attempts to assert a potential Korean claim in modern times.

== History ==
Though the royal court of Joseon dynasty Korea (1392–1897) recognized that the island was inhabited and controlled by Japanese, it generally maintained that the island had been Korean territory since ancient times, and that despite the lengthy Japanese occupation of the island it fundamentally rightfully belonged to Korea. The Sō samurai household, loyal vassals of each successive Japanese shogunate who acted as governors or lords of Tsushima since the 12th century, were also claimed as vassals by the kings of Joseon and consistently behaved accordingly.

The island was described by Hayashi Shihei in Sangoku Tsūran Zusetsu, which was published in 1785. As in many Japanese publications of the time, it was identified as part of Japan.

=== 20th century ===
In 1946, the Supreme Commander for the Allied Powers (SCAP) defined Japan to include the four main islands and approximately 1000 nearby islands, including Tsushima.

In 1948, the Republic of Korea (ROK) asserted its sovereignty over the island based on "historical claims". In 1949, the SCAP rejected South Korea's claim.

In 1951, United States-Korea negotiations about the Treaty of San Francisco made no mention of Tsushima Island. After this, the status of Tsushima as an island of Japan was re-confirmed by the US.

In 1974, Korea and Japan reaffirmed that Tsushima is part of Japan.

=== 21st century ===
In 2008, a small minority of members of the National Assembly of South Korea proposed claiming Tsushima as part of Korea. There were 50 members in this group.

In 2010, some members of the National Assembly proposed a study of Korea's territorial claims to Tsushima. There were 37 members in this group.

In 2013, a South Korean court decided the preliminary injunction that provisionally prevented a Buddhist statue stolen from a temple in Tsushima to South Korea from returning to the temple. A document found in the Buddhist statue showed that the statue was made in a Korean temple Buseoksa in 1330. Based on this record, some Koreans assume that the statue was moved illegally from Korea to Japan by Wokou in the late 14th century. Additionally, Buseoksa declared its ownership over the statue. This news provoked another wave of anger amongst the islanders and throughout much of Japan, as it was assumed that this could be a sign of Korean territorial ambitions.

=== Timeline ===
- 1946: SCAP lists Tsushima as part of Japan
- 1950: Korea claims the island
- 1951: South Korea sets aside claim to Tsushima
- 1974: South Korea-Japan treaty reconfirms Tsushima is Japanese island
- 2005: South Korean city Changwon City claims the island as South Korean territory.
- 2008: 50 members of ROK National Assembly propose re-claiming Tsushima
- 2010: 37 members of ROK National assembly propose study about re-claiming the island

== United States' position ==
A 1950 United States' report titled Korea's Recent Claim to the Island of Tsushima analyzed the Korean claim and says:

"While many Koreans may be convinced of the validity of the claim, it is obvious that the government's demands and popular support for them have not been based on a rational, legal analysis of the issue. The demands appear to be both a reflection of and calculated appeal to the nationalism and the anti-Japanese feelings that prevail throughout the Republic."

"There is no question of Tsushima's status as a dependency of Japan after 1668. The Japanese reorganization of the government of Tsushima following the Meiji Restoration antagonized the Koreans, but they could only express disapproval of it. No other nation has sought to challenge Japan's control since 1668. Therefore, from the information available, Korea's claim does not appear to be well-founded. Although Korea apparently held a dominant position on the island before 500 A.D., its claim to control in subsequent periods is not supported by the facts available. On the contrary, there is little doubt that during at least 350 years Japan has exercised complete and effective control of Tsushima."
