= Sendango =

Japanese sweet potato dish

- Alternative names: Rokube ingredient
- Type: Fermented food, preserved food
- Course: Staple / preserved food
- Place of origin: Japan
- Region or state: Tsushima, Nagasaki
- Associated cuisine: Japanese cuisine
- Created by: Local Tsushima residents
- Invented: Edo period
- Serving temperature: Dried or in noodle form (rokube)
- Main ingredients: Fermented sweet potato
- Variations: Rokube (noodles made from sendango)
- Other information: Traditionally produced through a four-month fermentation and drying cycle

Sendango is a traditional delicacy made from fermented ground sweet potato, characteristic of Tsushima, Nagasaki, Japan. Sendango is also used to make rokube, a noodle prepared from small dumplings of the product. The flavour doesn't come from the sweet potatoes alone, the fermentation adds to the flavour profile of the noodles.

== History and Culture of the Food ==
The history of the food dates back to the Edo period in Japan. The local residents of Tsushima Island had to innovate in order to survive under the harsh conditions on the island. Tsushima Island suffered from repeated famines during the Edo period, as it was difficult to grow rice or wheat in the local soil. Local resident Harada Saburoemo returned from Satsuma one day with a single sweet potato; it was found that the vegetable was easy to grow on the island. Farmers produced large numbers of sweet potatoes, but still faced the problem of how to safely store the crop (harvested in the fall and needing to last until the next year). After much trial and error, an acceptable method of preservation was found. First, the sweet potatoes are crushed into small pieces and soaked in water. They naturally ferment, with the mold that grew on the small pieces enhancing their flavour and preservability. The dried pieces of sweet potato were then dried in the sun and cold wind, and put back in water. The mixture was rubbed through a sieve, with the process of drying and fermentation repeated over four months, to create one year's worth of preserved food. It was once common to feed the product to babies as soon as they could eat. Production usually starts after the November harvest and continues until March.

It is thought to be called ‘’sendango’’, as the process to make it involves ‘’sen’’, one thousand steps. Though once common, the knowledge to make the food product is slowly dying out. One senior resident noted on an NHK program in November 2025 that not many people make it these days, as it takes a lot of time and effort. Also, local sendango production has been declining yearly since (at least 2010.) and it is now hard to find it in shops on the island.

=== Future of sendango ===
Researchers have studied the product and note that microbes are responsible for the distinctive flavour. They've developed a method to use microbes to make the product in two weeks, instead of the four months it normally takes; allowing for mass-production of sendango. The researchers noted that small producers lose money making sendango, they hope mass production will keep the product alive for others to enjoy in the future, as the artisanal production method loses popularity.

== Analysis of the product ==
Several studies have looked at the fermented product; it is noted to be 90% starch. Several starch-decomposing fungi were found, among those were Aspergillus, Mucor and Penicillium, as well as some varieties of Saccharomyces.
