= Tsushima Subprefecture =

Administrative subdivision of Nagasaki Prefecture, Japan

Tsushima Subprefecture (対馬支庁, Tsushima-shichō, 34°12′38″N 129°17′23″E) was an administrative subdivision of Nagasaki Prefecture, Japan. The subprefecture was the administrative body for Tsushima Island which lies between Kyūshū and the Korean Peninsula. The only municipality in Tsushima Subprefecture is Tsushima City, which itself is the composite of the merger of six smaller towns (Kamiagata: Kami-agata, Kami-tsushima, Mine and Shimoagata: Izuhara, Mitsushima, Toyotama) on the island.
