= Iki-Tsushima Quasi-National Park =

Park in Nagasaki, Japan

- 壱岐対馬国定公園
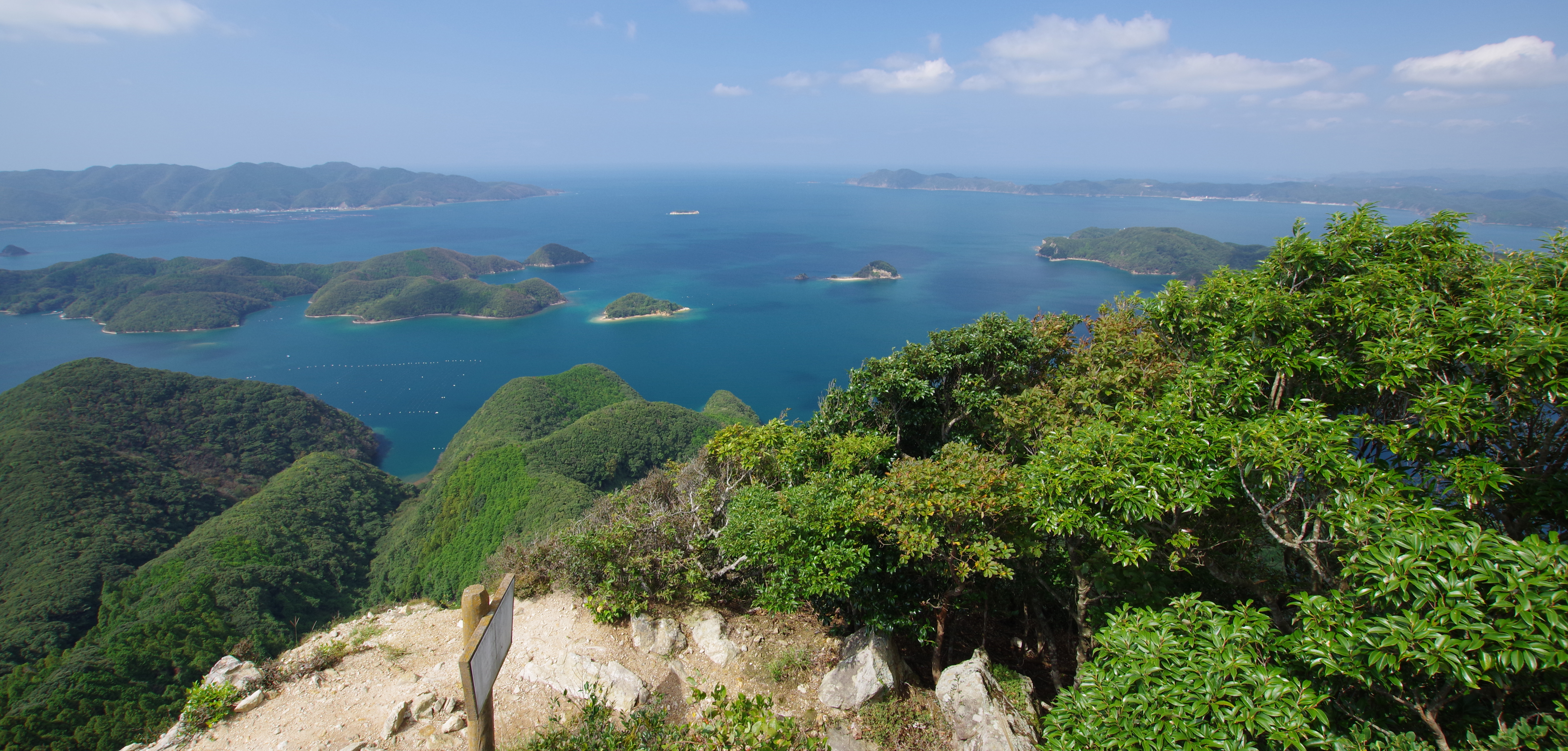
- Asō Bay

- Location within Japan
- Location: Nagasaki Prefecture, Japan
- Coordinates: 34.328°N 129.34°E
- Area: 119.50 km^{2} (46.14 sq mi)
- Established: July 22, 1968

Iki-Tsushima Kokutei Kōen (壱岐対馬国定公園) is a Quasi-National Park on Iki Island and Tsushima Island, Nagasaki Prefecture, Japan. It was founded on 22 July 1968 and has an area of 119.50 km^{2} (46.14 sq mi).

== See also ==
- List of national parks of Japan
