= Kamino-shima =

Double-mountained northern end of Tsushima Island in Japan

Coordinates: 34°42′24″N 129°26′57″E

Kamijima (上島) is the double-mountained northern end of Tsushima Island, which lies in the Korea Strait between the East China Sea to the south and the Sea of Japan to the north, and Korea to the west and mainland Japan to the east. The famous naval Battle of Tsushima was fought east and northeast of Kamino-shima in the Tsushima Strait. The northwest tip of Kamino-shima lies about 50 km from Busan, South Korea.
