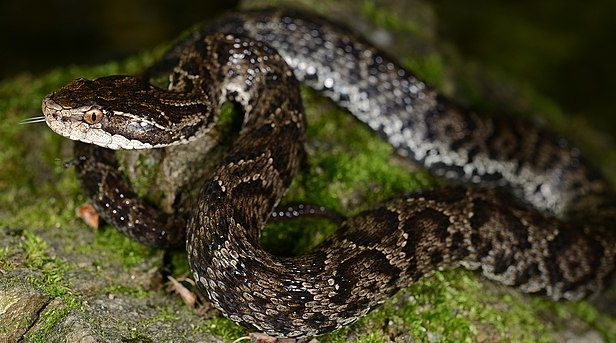

Conservation status
- Least Concern (IUCN 3.1)

Scientific classification
- Kingdom: Animalia
- Phylum: Chordata
- Class: Reptilia
- Order: Squamata
- Suborder: Serpentes
- Family: Viperidae
- Genus: Gloydius
- Species: G. tsushimaensis

Binomial name
- Gloydius tsushimaensis (Isogawa, Moriya & Mitsui, 1994)

Synonyms
- Agkistrodon tsushimaensis Isogawa, Moriya & Mitsui, 1994; Gloydius tsushimaensis — Gumprecht et al., 2004

= Gloydius tsushimaensis =

Species of snake

Gloydius tsushimaensis, or the Tsushima Island pitviper, is a species of venomous snake in the family Viperidae. The species is endemic to Tsushima Island in Japan.

== Diet ==
G. tsushimaensis is known to feed on frogs and shrews. Scavenging behavior has also been observed in the species.

== Reproduction ==
While little is known about the mating seasons of Gloydius species in Japan, present observation suggests that the mating season of G. tsushimaensis is similar to that of G. blomhoffii, which is considered to be August and September. They are known to be ovoviviparous.
