= Tsushima Strait =

Channel of the Korea Strait

Coordinates: 34.0075°N 129.49°E

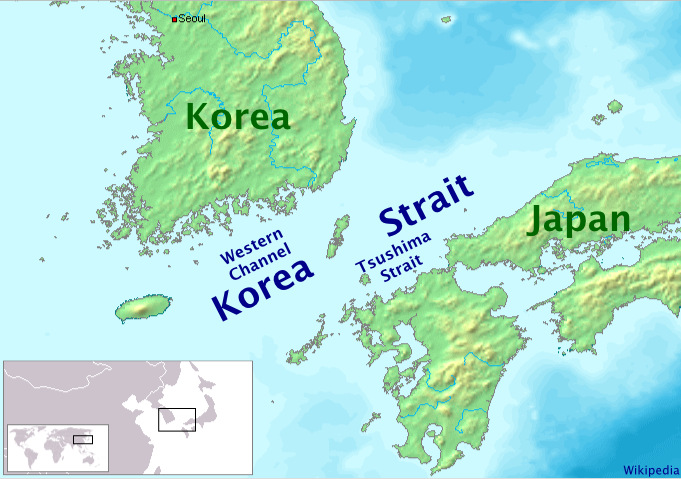
The map of the Tsushima strait

Tsushima Strait (対馬海峡, Tsushima Kaikyō) or Eastern Channel (동수로; Dongsuro) is a channel of the Korea Strait, which lies between Korea and Japan, connecting the Sea of Japan, the Yellow Sea, and the East China Sea.

The strait is the channel to the east and southeast of Tsushima Island, with the Japanese islands of Honshu to the east and northeast, and Kyushu and the Gotō Islands to the south and southeast. It is narrowest south-east of Shimono-shima, the south end of Tsushima Island proper, constricted there by nearby Iki Island, which lies wholly in the strait near the tip of Honshu. South of that point Japan's Inland Sea mingles its waters through the narrow Kanmon Strait between Honshu and Kyushu, with those of the Eastern Channel, making for some of the busiest sea lanes in the world.

The Strait was the site of the last and most decisive naval battle in the Russo-Japanese War, the Battle of Tsushima, between the Japanese and Russian navies in 1905, in which the Russian fleet was virtually destroyed.

== Geography ==
The Tsushima Strait measures approximately 100 kilometres along Tsushima Island and is about 65 kilometres wide at its narrowest. The strait has a depth of about 140 metres and is bounded by the Tsushima Islands to the west through north (of Gotō Islands). Nearby Iki Island lies in the strait about 50 kilometres towards Kyūshū from the southern tip of Kamino-shima (South Island).

A warm branch of the Kuroshio Current passes through the strait. Originating along the Japanese islands, this current passes through the Sea of Japan then a branch eventually flowing into the Northern Pacific Ocean via the Tsugaru Strait south of Hokkaido. Another branch continues far northward and divides along either shore of Sakhalin Island; eventually flowing into the Sea of Okhotsk via the La Perouse Strait north of Hokkaido and via the Strait of Tartary into the Sea of Okhotsk north of Sakhalin Island near Vladivostok.

The Kuroshio Current brings rich fisheries resources from the East China Sea into the Sea of Japan, like Japanese amberjack, Japanese horse mackerel, but these days also brings disaster like mass aggregation of gigantic Nomura's jellyfish and waste from countries along the course of the current.

A commercial ferry service operates between Shimonoseki at the western tip of Honshu and Busan (aka Pusan), South Korea. Another operates between Shimonoseki and Tsushima Island. The cities of Kitakyushu (Kyushu) and Shimonoseki (Honshu) are joined by an ocean-spanning bridge across the Kanmon Strait joining those cities with Nagasaki, which latter city serves as prefecture-level capital and administers both Tsushima and Iki Island. The Kanmon Strait lies approximately 85 miles (135 km) due east of the center of Tsushima Island, while Nagasaki city proper lies about 100 miles (165 km) to the south-south-east of the southern tip of the island.

== Historical impact ==
The earliest settlement of Japan by people most resembling modern Japanese in littoral northern Kyushu next to the Eastern Channel is supported by legendary, historical, and archeological evidence, and is undisputed. A range of dates when immigration began from what is the mainland via the Korean Peninsula to north Kyushu from the fall of Four Commanderies of Han (108 BC) to the 4th century AD. Historically these narrows (i.e., the whole Korea/Tsushima Strait) served as a highway for high-risk voyages (southern end of the Korean Peninsula to the Tsushima Islands to Iki Island to the western tip of Honshu) for trade between the countries of the Korean peninsula and Japan.

The straits also served as a migration or an invasion path, in both directions. For example, archeologists believe the first Mesolithic migrations (Jōmon) traveled across to Honshu around the 10th century BC, supplanting Paleolithic people that walked from Asia to Japan overland over 100,000 years ago when the sea level was lower during the Pleistocene ice age. Immigrants from Korea and China also contributed to waves of immigrants arriving in Kyushu, although who, when, and how many exactly is a matter of intense debate. Buddhism, along with Chinese writing, was initially transmitted from Korean Peninsula via Eastern Channel to Japan in the 5th century by way of the straits as well. Iki to Kamino-shima, the southern end of the large island of Tsushima, is about 50 kilometres. Busan (Korea), to the northern tip of Tsushima, about the same across the Korea Strait. These were tremendous distances to attempt in small boats over open seas.

The Mongol invasions of Japan crossed this sea and ravaged the Tsushima Islands before the kamikaze – translated as "divine wind" – a typhoon that is said to have saved Japan from a Mongol invasion fleet led by Kublai Khan in 1281. The 16th century, Toyotomi Hideyoshi was aimed at the conquest of China via the Korean Peninsula from this strait.

The decisive naval battle in the Russo-Japanese War, the Battle of Tsushima, took place in the strait between the Japanese and Russian navies in 1905; the Russian fleet was virtually destroyed by a Japanese naval force for the loss of only three Japanese torpedo boats.

Japan's territorial waters extend to three nautical miles (5.6 km) into the strait instead of the usual twelve, reportedly to allow nuclear-armed United States Navy warships and submarines to transit the strait without violating Japan's prohibition against nuclear weapons in its territory.

== See also ==
- List of Japan-related topics
- Geography of Korea
- Geography of Japan
- Russo-Japanese War
- Tsushima City
