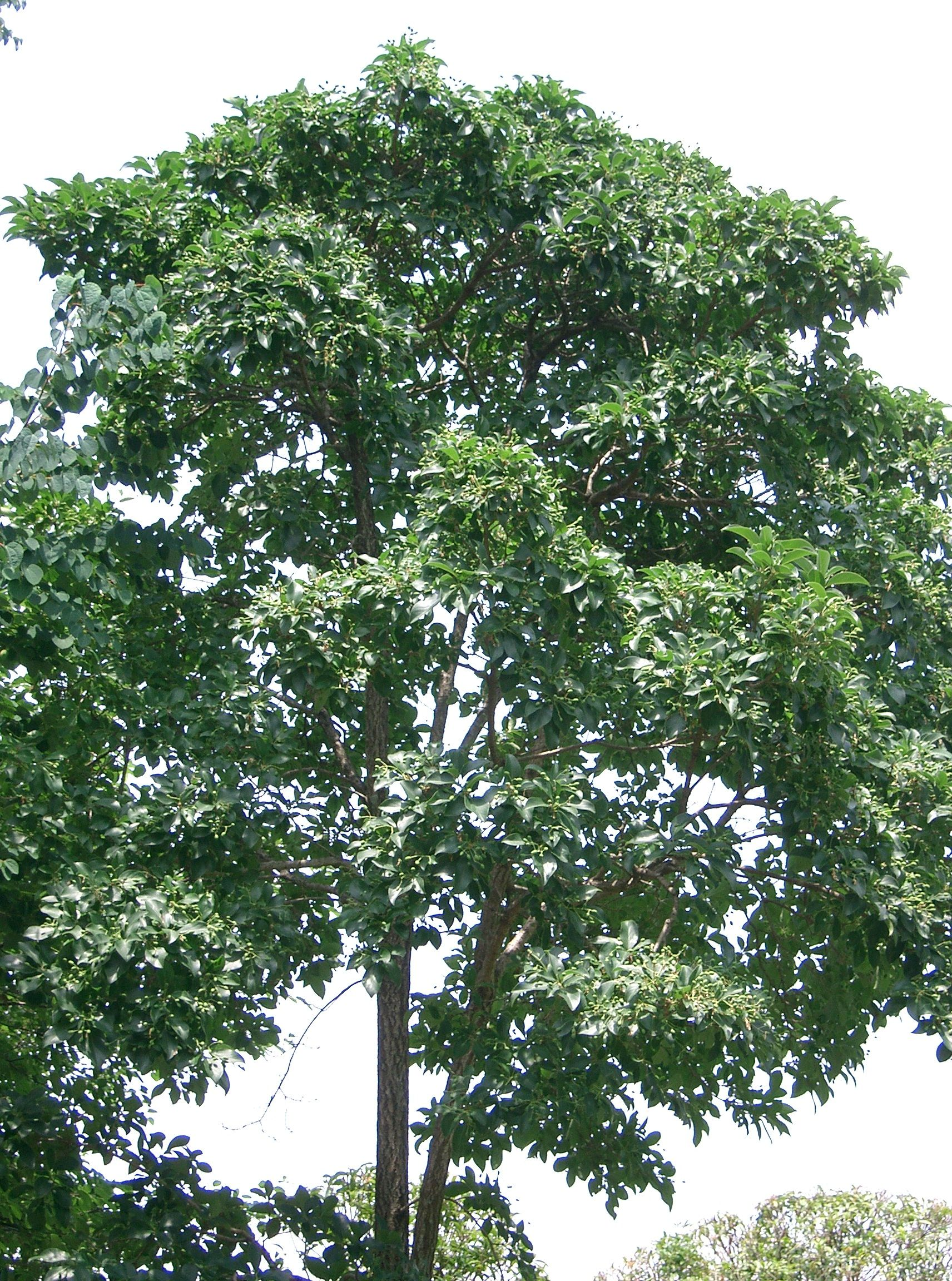
- Specimen at Osaka-fu, Japan

Scientific classification
- Kingdom: Plantae
- Clade: Tracheophytes
- Clade: Angiosperms
- Clade: Eudicots
- Clade: Asterids
- Order: Lamiales
- Family: Oleaceae
- Genus: Chionanthus
- Species: C. retusus

Binomial name
- Chionanthus retusus Lindl. & Paxton

= Chionanthus retusus =

Species of tree

Chionanthus retusus, the Chinese fringetree, is a flowering plant in the family Oleaceae. It is native to eastern Asia: eastern and central China, Japan, Korea and Taiwan.

It is a deciduous shrub or small to medium-sized tree growing to 20 metres (70 ft) in height, with thick, fissured bark. The leaves are 3–12 centimetres (1–5 in) long and 2–6.5 cm (0.8–2.6 in) broad, simple ovate to oblong-elliptic, with a hairy, 0.5–2 cm (0.2–0.8 in) long petiole. The flowers are white, produced in panicles 3–12 cm (1–5 in) long. The fruit is a blue-black drupe 1–1.5 cm (0.4–0.6 in) long and 0.6–1 cm (0.2–0.4 in) in diameter.

It is cultivated in Europe and North America as an ornamental tree, valued for its feathery white flowerheads.

In Japan's Aichi Prefecture near Inuyama there is a grove of seven mature Chionanthus retusus renowned for their yearly white blooms. They were designated by the authorities as a natural monument since 1923.

== Gallery ==
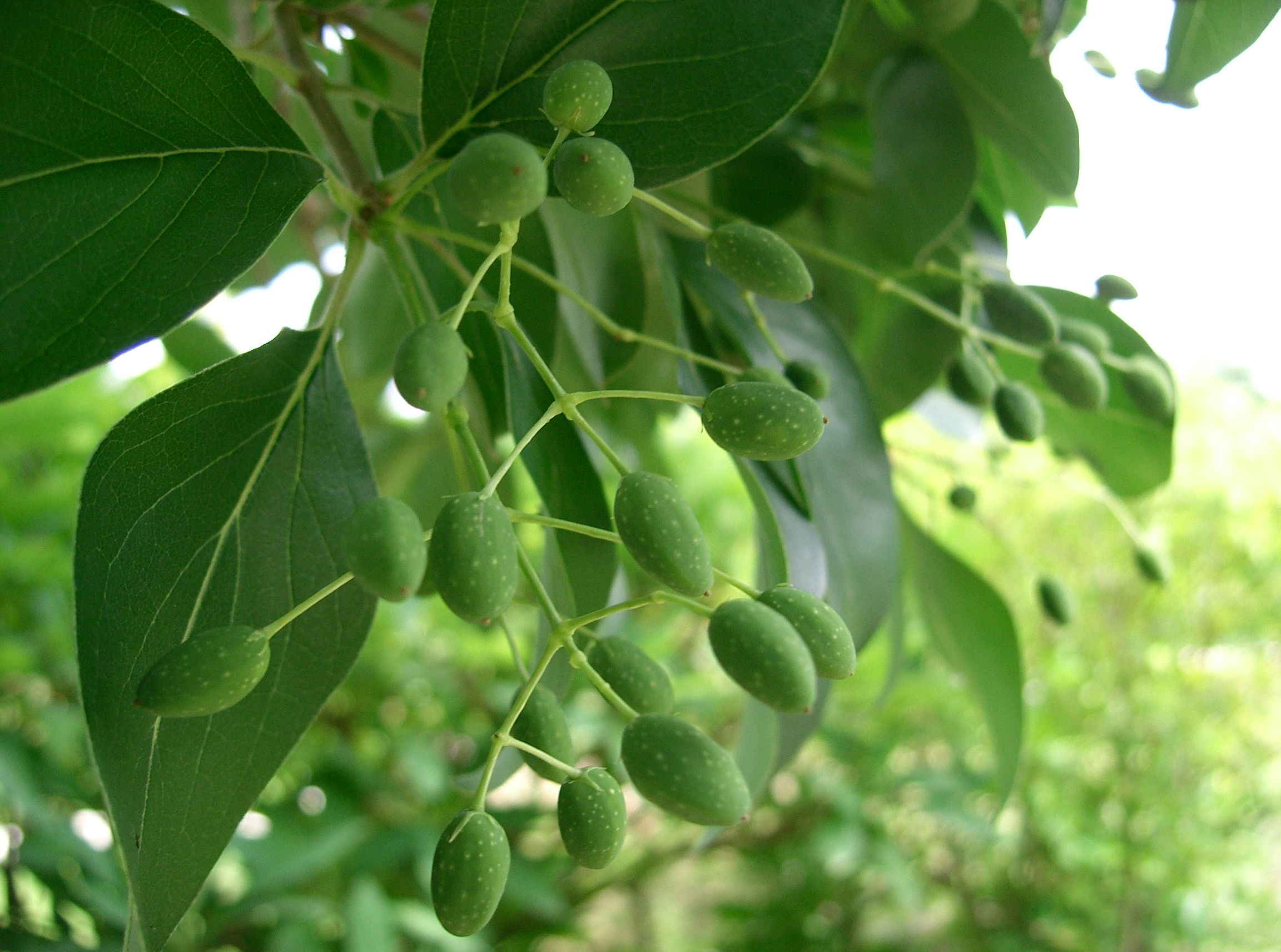
Foliage and fruit

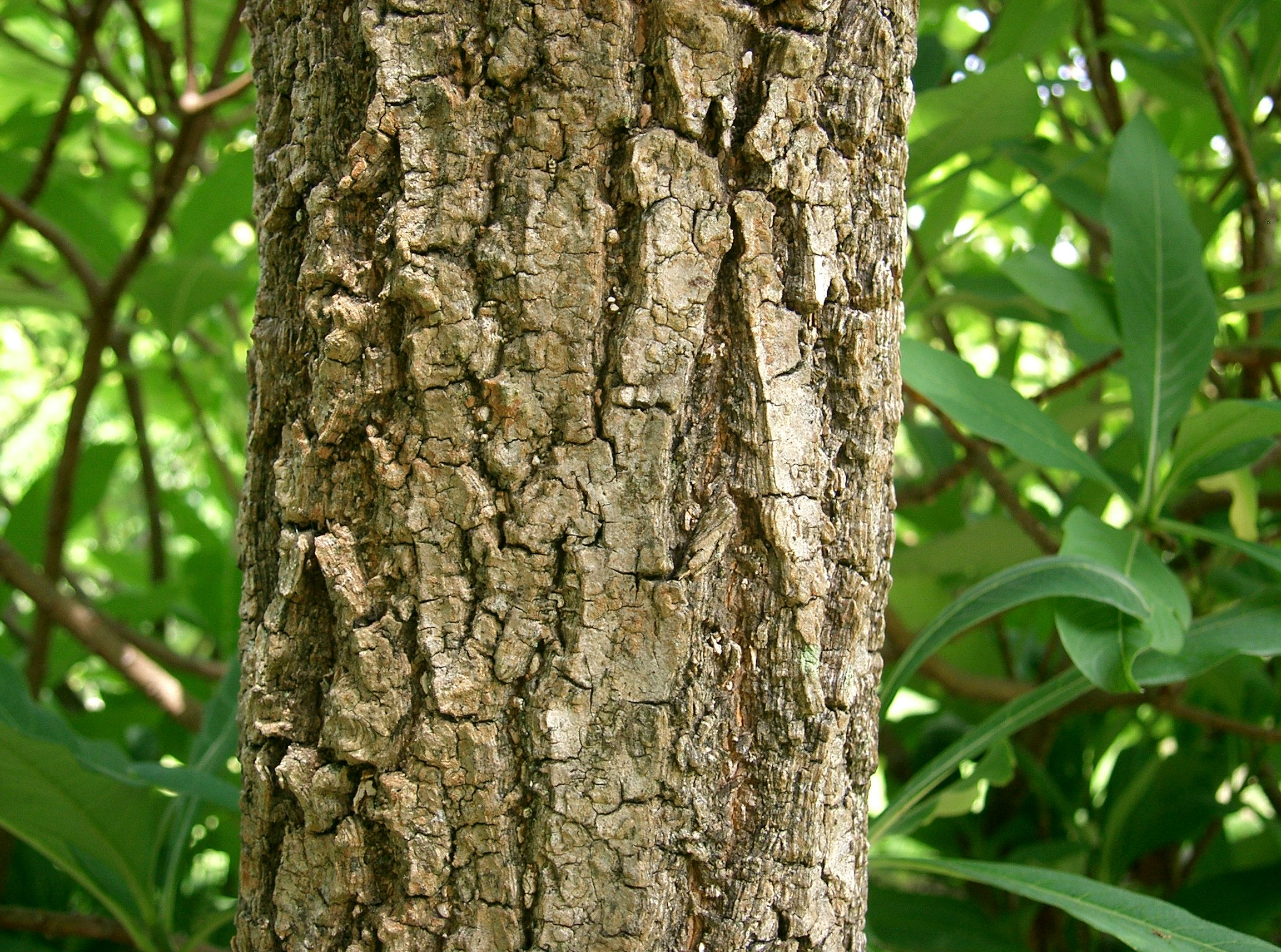
Bark

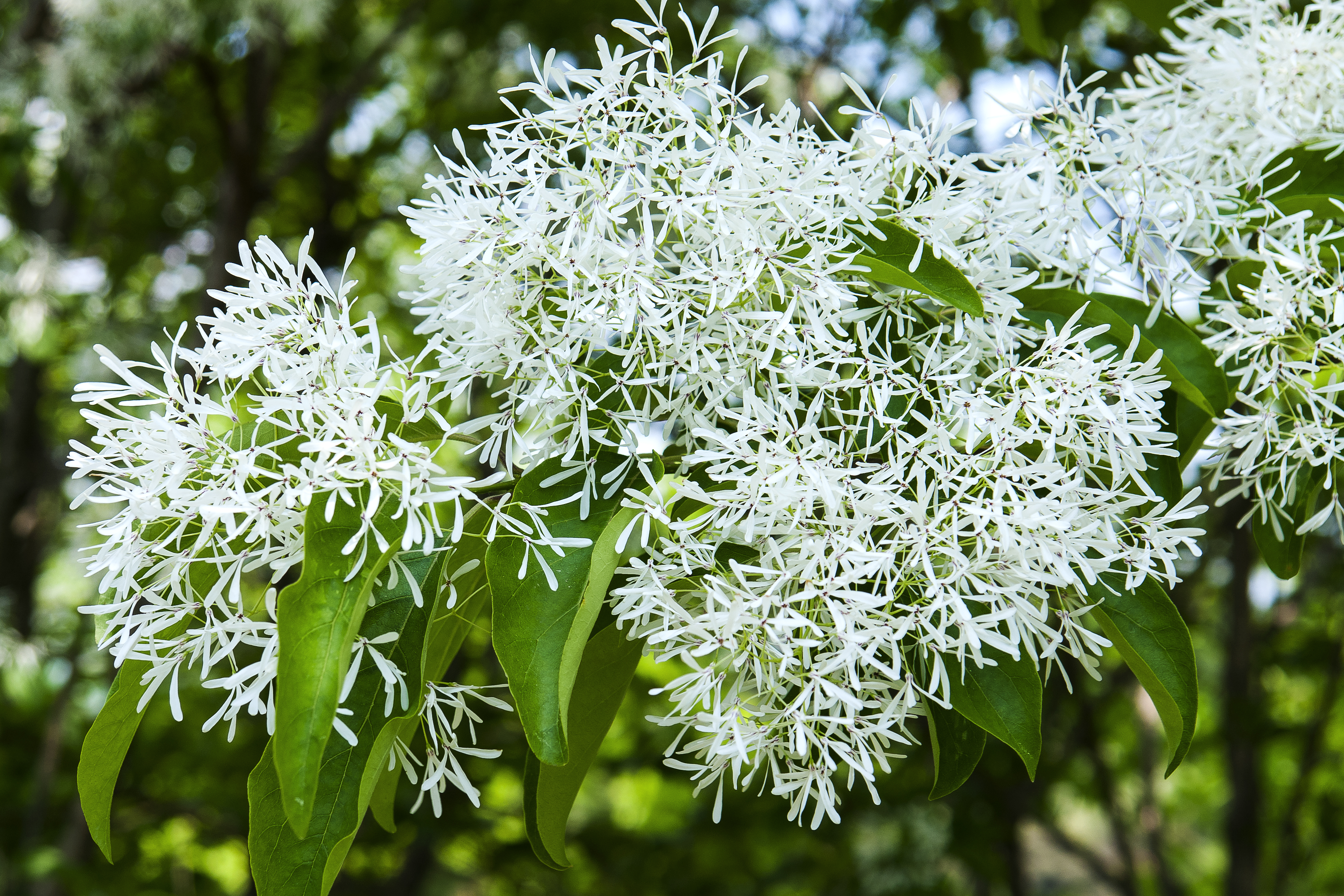
Flowers

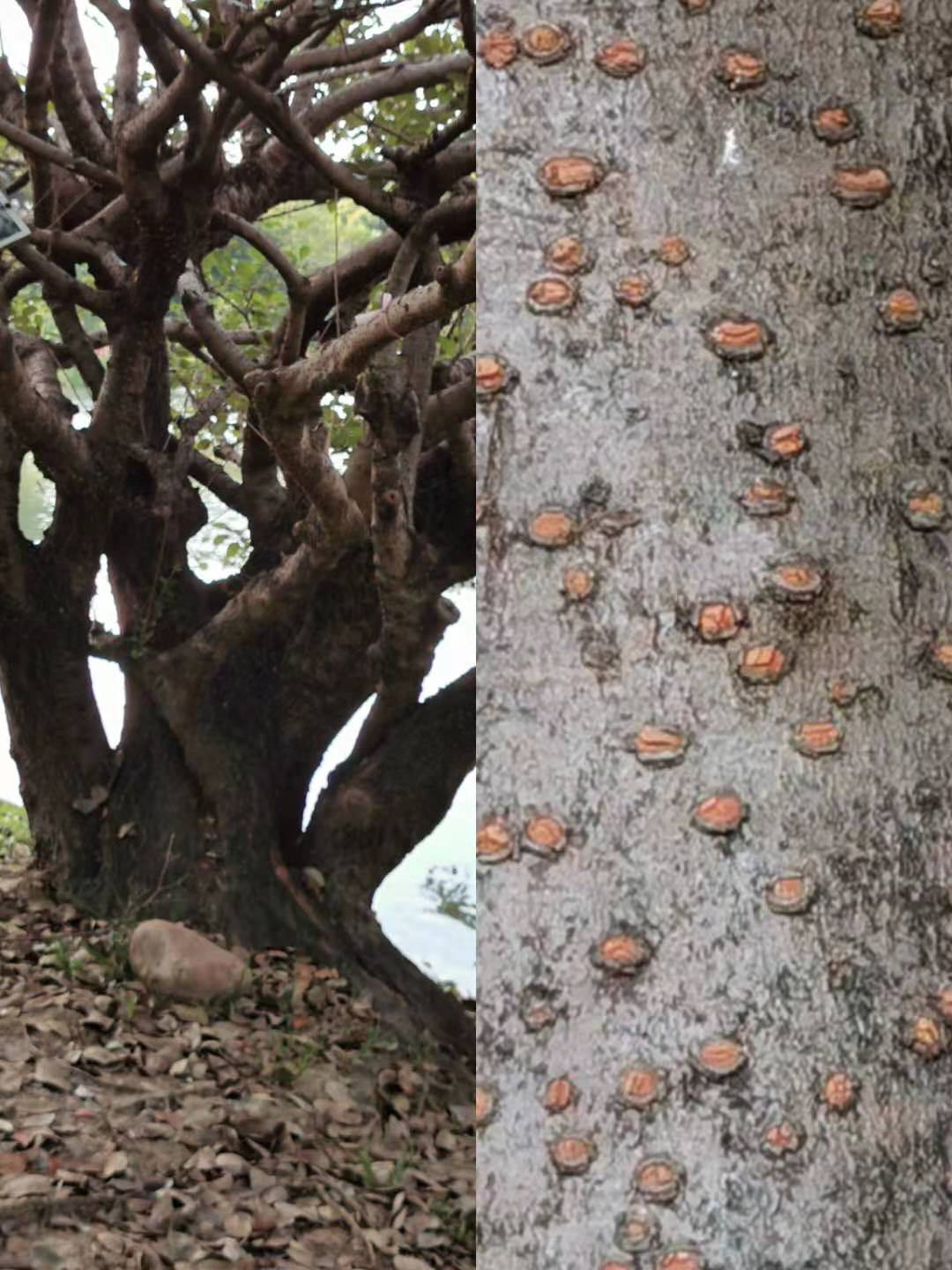
Habitat:waterside and bark, Taiwan.
