= Satsuma =

Satsuma may refer to:

- Satsuma (fruit), a citrus fruit
- Satsuma (gastropod), a genus of land snails

== Places ==
=== Japan ===
- Satsuma, Kagoshima, a Japanese town
- Satsuma District, Kagoshima, a district in Kagoshima Prefecture
- Satsuma Domain, a southern Japanese feudal domain
- Satsuma Peninsula, in Kagoshima Prefecture
- Satsuma Province, a former province
- Japanese battleship Satsuma of the Imperial Navy

=== United States ===
- Satsuma, Alabama
- Satsuma, Louisiana
- Satsuma, Texas
- Satsuma, Florida

== Other uses ==
- Satsuma Loans, a UK-based short-term loan company
- Satsuma plum, a type of plum
- Satsuma Rebellion, a revolt
- Satsuma ware, a type of Japanese pottery
- Biwa, a lute with a form known as Satsuma biwa
- Satsuma, the car the player builds and drives in the video game My Summer Car
