= Shimono-shima =

Southern end of Tsushima Island in Japan

Coordinates: 34°05′02″N 129°12′51″E

Shimojima (下島) is the southern end of Tsushima Island, which lies in the Korea Strait between the East China Sea to the south and the Sea of Japan to the north, and Korea to the west and mainland Japan to the east.
