= Disturbance of the Three Ports =

Date	April 4 – April 19, 1510
Location	Southern Korean Peninsula
Result	Joseon victory

Belligerents
Joseon	Waegwan; Sō clan

Commanders and leaders
Yi U-jeung †; Kim Sae-gyun †; Yu Sun-jeong; Yu Dam-nyeon; Hwang Hyeong	Sô Kunichika †; Obarishi; Yasko

Units involved
Joseon Army; Joseon Navy	Rioters; Sō Navy

Strength
5,000	4,000–5,000; 200 Ships

Casualties and losses
272 soldiers and civilians killed	295 killed 5 ships sunk

- Disturbance of the Three Ports
- Hangul: 삼포왜란
- Hanja: 三浦倭亂
- Revised Romanization: Sampo Waeran
- McCune–Reischauer: Samp'o Waeran

The Disturbance of the Three Ports, also known as Sampo Waeran (Korean: 삼포왜란) or Sanpo no Ran (Japanese: 三浦の乱), refers to riots in 1510 by Japanese citizens residing in the Korean port cities Dongnae, Changwon and Ulsan. They killed the Commander of Busan (Busan Cheomsa 釜山僉使), kidnapped the Commander of Jepo (Jepo Cheomsa 薺浦僉使), besieged Ungcheon Fortress, and plundered nearby villages, throwing the Sampo region into chaos. However, they were soon suppressed by Joseon government troops. Following this incident, Joseon closed the Sampo and cut off relations with Japan. Tsushima soon fell into hardship due to lack of supplies and desperately petitioned for the resumption of trade. In the end, the two sides signed the Imshin Treaty (壬申約條) under stricter conditions and reduced trade quotas.

== Background ==
With the founding of Joseon, the kingdom established new relations with surrounding states. After receiving investiture from the Ming Dynasty, Joseon entered into a tributary relationship with China, while maintaining equal diplomatic relations with Japan’s Muromachi shogunate.

In the early 1400s, the Muromachi shogunate dispatched envoys to Joseon to establish diplomatic relations. Joseon accepted this, treating it as an equal state-to-state relationship under Ming’s overarching suzerainty. Over time, however, the shogunate’s central control weakened. Many envoys sent to Joseon merely borrowed the shogunate’s name and acted on their own authority, often humbling themselves in order to obtain items such as Buddhist scriptures from Joseon. Gradually, Joseon began to treat these Japanese envoys as inferior rather than equal.

Eventually, the shogunate lost its grip on Japan entirely. Local powers near Joseon began independently conducting trade and exchanges, particularly revolving around requests for copies of the Buddhist Tripitaka.

From the beginning of relations, Japan showed strong interest in Joseon’s Buddhist scriptures. Joseon often printed and shared copies with them. Over time, many Japanese envoys seemed more focused on acquiring the Tripitaka than on diplomacy itself.

=== Ōei Invasion ===
Joseon did not entirely reject these contacts but allowed limited trade and even granted Japanese figures honorary official titles, as a way to prevent them from turning into pirates (wokou). In 1419 (the 1st year of King Sejong), Yi Jong-mu was ordered to attack Tsushima, warning them against piracy. This was the Ōei Invasion.

In May 1419, former king Taejong and the young King Sejong approved the expedition. Yi Jong-mu, appointed as Supreme Commander, led fleets from Gyeongsang, Jeolla, and Chungcheong provinces with 200 ships. On June 19, they set sail from Ju-wonbangpo near Geoje Island. The Joseon forces landed on Tsushima, burned houses and ships, and freed Korean captives. Some divisions suffered ambushes, but ultimately the Japanese forces retreated.

Later, from 1426 (Sejong 8) to 1436 (Sejong 18), Joseon opened three designated ports (Sampo) for trade. Among Japanese powers, Tsushima had the closest ties. In 1443 (Sejong 25), Joseon and Tsushima signed the Gyehae Treaty, limiting Tsushima’s annual trading ships to 50 and setting the annual grain stipend at 200 seok. This formalized Joseon’s early diplomatic trade system with Japan.

=== Conditions ===
Originally, Japanese traders were only permitted to reside in the ports temporarily. After trade and fishing were completed, the Japanese were required to return immediately. However, the Japanese disregarded these rules and continued to enter and reside in the Three Ports, developing their ethnic enclaves called waegwan. Only about 60 long-term residents, called hanggeo-waein (恒居倭人, “permanent resident Japanese”), were permitted to remain temporarily.

Yet, as part of conciliatory policies, Joseon granted them tax exemptions. But as their numbers increased each year, this posed significant political and social problems. These leniencies were abused, leading to frequent violations of regulations by the Japanese, which escalated during the reign of Yeonsangun. In 1506, as part of his political reforms, King Jungjong enforced strict legal controls on the Japanese.

== Riots ==
Although this trade system was institutionalized, by the reigns of Seongjong and Yeonsangun, Tsushima Japanese of Tsushima became dissatisfied with Joseon’s strict trade controls and poor financial hospitality. Increasingly, the waegwan broke regulations, and piracy flared again. Joseon repeatedly responded only with temporary fixes rather than lasting solutions.

In April 1510, two Japanese men, Obarishi and Yasko, allied with Tsushima forces and mobilized 4000 and 5000 armed and armored men to besiege Ungcheon Fortress, plundered nearby areas, and kidnapped Jepo Commander Kim Se-gyun near Naei port. Simultaneously, Japanese in Busanpo, and Yeompo also revolted. They killed Busan Commander Yi U-jeung at Baeu and then retreated. Concurrently, a Sō clan fleet of 200 ships led by Sō Kunichika, son of Sō Yoshimori (宗義盛), the governor of Tsushima Island attacked Geoje Island. Afterward, the Japanese gathered at Naei Port. The Joseon court appointed Yu Sun-jeong as Supreme Commander, with Hwang Hyeong as Left Gyeongsang Defense Commander and Yu Dam-nyeon as Right Gyeongsang Defense Commander, mobilizing 5,000 troops for suppression. The Joseon Navy also engaged the rioters and the Sō fleet and the they promptly recaptured Naei Port. As a result, Sō Kunichika was killed and the riots were fully suppressed within 15 days, forcing the surviving Japanese to flee to Tsushima.

The riots resulted in 272 Korean civilians killed, 796 homes destroyed, 295 Japanese people killed, and five Japanese ships sunk. The Joseon government sent relief to people living in the affected regions and deported all remaining Japanese people to Tsushima Island. When the dead from the riots were buried, the graves of the Japanese were marked differently; the Joseon court piled up the heads of the executed Japanese in large burial mounds so that any future arrivals would feel fear and caution to warn future visitors to Korea of the consequences of participating in riots.

Afterward, rewards and banquets were held for the troops, and an official inquiry into merit was conducted by order of King Jungjong. For their service in suppressing the uprising, 873 men were rewarded: Hwang Hyeong and 187 others received first-class merit, magistrate Baek Saban (白斯班) and 325 others received second-class, and Gapsa (armored soldier) Gwon Yeongsaeng (權永生) and 358 others received third-class.

== Aftermath ==
After the riots, Joseon immediately cut off ties with Tsushima. This negatively affected the Japanese people living on Tsushima Island and Japanese citizens demanded a re-opening of the ports. The riot damaged relations between two countries and the 1443 Treaty of Gyehae was undone. In 1511 (Jungjong 6), the Muromachi shogunate dispatched an envoy, Bōchū (弸中), to request peace and the restoration of trade.

After negotiations, Tsushima punished some ringleaders and returned Korean captives. Finally, in 1512 (Jungjong 7), Joseon signed the Imshin Treaty (壬申約條) under stricter conditions:

1. Japanese were banned from residing in the three ports, with only Jepo permitted as an open port.
2. Annual Tsushima trade ships were reduced from 50 to 25.
3. The grain stipend for Tsushima was halved from 200 seok to 100.
4. Special trade ships (beyond the annual quota) were abolished.
5. Trade privileges for the Tsushima lord’s relatives and retainers were revoked.
6. Any unauthorized ships would be treated as pirates and punished.
7. Trade demands from Japanese outside Tsushima would be rejected.
8. The number of ports and shipping routes was strictly limited.
9. Carrying weapons was banned for all Japanese except official envoys.

Joseon could not completely sever relations with Japan, especially due to longstanding ties and repeated requests from the shogunate and the Ōuchi clan. Thus, it accepted renewed relations under stricter, reduced trade conditions. Compared to the period before the Sampo Waeran, these measures imposed far greater restrictions, reflecting Joseon’s determination to control Japanese activity. They reduced both the costs of hosting Japanese envoys and Japanese trade profits. As a result, the early Joseon system of diplomatic trade relations with Japan effectively collapsed.

After the Imshin Treaty (1512), the number of permitted trade ships (segyeonseon 世遣船) was reduced from 210 (before the disturbance) to 60. With trade thus restricted, the lord of Tsushima demanded increases in the quota, as well as the restoration and expansion of privileges for his retainers (sujigin 隨直人 and sudo-seoin 受圖書人). His aim was to concentrate trade benefits in Tsushima.

== Legacy ==
In August of 1521 (16th year of King Jungjong), Busanpo was reopened in addition to Jepo, and in the 18th year (1523), five ships were added to the trade quota. Amid this climate, in April of the 39th year of Jungjong’s reign (1544), about 20 Japanese ships invaded and plundered Saryangjin (蛇梁津) in Gyeongsang Province. This incident, called the Saryangjin Waebyeon, was unlike the Disturbance of the Three Ports—it was an act of piracy. Although casualties numbered only around 10, its impact was great. Voices arose advocating a total prohibition of Japanese entry (絶倭論; "Absolute Ban on the Japanese"), and relations between Joseon and Japan were severed, except for ties with the Muromachi shogunate and the Ōuchi and Shōni clans.

With repeated petitions from the shogunate and the Ōuchi, along with pleas from Tsushima's lord, trade was eventually reopened in 1547 (2nd year of King Myeongjong) under the Jeongmi Treaty (丁未約條). Its six articles included:

- Reducing Tsushima's trade ships to 25
- Abolishing hospitality toward sudo-seoin and sujigin if 50 years had passed
- Prohibiting smuggling (潛商; chamseong)
- Other restrictions.

The Jeongmi Treaty reaffirmed and tightened the terms of the Imshin Treaty. It also closed Jepo, leaving only Busanpo as the sole open port. Though trade resumed, peaceful relations became far more difficult.

After the Disturbance of the Three Ports, more than 30 pirate raids occurred until the end of King Myeongjong's reign. The largest was the Eulmyo Waebyeon (乙卯倭變) in 1555 (Myeongjong 10). Wang Zhi, a major pirate leader based in the Gotō Islands, led more than 70 ships to invade Dallyangpo (達梁浦, modern Bukpyeong-myeon, Haenam County, Jeollanam-do). They killed the provincial commander of Jeolla and the magistrate of Jangheung, advancing as far as Yeongam. Retreating from Dallyang, the pirates regrouped and in late June, with over 1,000 men, invaded Hwabukpo in Jeju Island. These two raids together are called the Eulmyo Waebyeon.

Ten days before the Jeju raid, Tsushima’s lord Sō Morinaga (宗盛長) sent intelligence that about 90 enemy ships had left Tsushima in three groups for Joseon, while others were restrained from departure. This information was given on the condition that Joseon restore Tsushima’s annual trade ship quota and rice stipend (sesamidu) to the pre-Imshin levels. In October of 1556 (Myeongjong 11), envoys Tenfu (天富) and Gyeongcheol (景轍), sent by the Tsushima lord but claiming the title of Japanese envoys, arrived to renegotiate the terms. In April of the following year (Myeongjong 12), the Jeongsa Treaty (丁巳約條) was concluded, increasing the Tsushima quota by four ships, restoring it to 30. This quota remained in place until diplomatic ties were severed with the outbreak of the Imjin War (1592).

Japan’s desire to expand trade with Joseon ultimately backfired, as the Disturbance of the Three Ports led Joseon to pursue reduced trade instead. The vibrant activity of Muromachi-period merchants and daimyos from regions west of the capital, Wakasa, and Shinano—whose ships once flocked to Joseon—faded away. Apart from the Ōuchi clan, overall decline set in. Roughly a decade after the Sampo Waeran, in 1523 (Jungjong 18), Japanese merchants rioted at the Ming trade port of Ningbo. Rivalries between the Sakai merchant alliance and the Hosokawa in the Kinai region, and the Hakata merchants and Ōuchi clan in Kyushu, escalated into the Ningbo Incident. As a result, the Ōuchi gained dominance over licensed tribute trade with Ming.

However, because of the Ningbo Incident, the Ming court abolished this tribute trade in 1547 (Myeongjong 2), dealing a heavy economic blow to Japan. Later, Toyotomi Hideyoshi, after unifying Japan, sought new opportunities for trade with Ming. Around 1589 (Seonjo 22), he considered suppressing piracy in exchange for restoring official trade. But three years later, in 1592 (Seonjo 25), he abandoned the idea and launched his invasion of China through Korea. This was the Imjin War. Politically, the war was meant to resolve conflicts among rival daimyōs; economically, it was a transformational war intended to break Japan’s disadvantageous trade position.

== See also ==
- History of Korea
- Military history of Korea

== Bibliography ==
- "Sanp'o Uprising." Encyclopedia of Japan. Kodansha.
- "Sanpo no ran" 三浦の乱. Digital Daijisen デジタル大辞泉. Shogakukan.
- "Sanpo no ran" 三浦の乱. Nihon daihyakkata zensho Nipponica 日本大百科全書(ニッポニカ). Shogakukan.
