= Naval history of Korea =

The naval history of Korea dates back thousands of years since the prehistoric times when simple fishing ships were used. Military naval history dates back to the Three Kingdoms period and Unified Silla dynasties of Korea in the 7th century. Because of the constant coastal attacks by the Wa Japanese and barbarian tribes, Korean shipbuilding excelled to counter these threats as a result. During the Unified Silla period, Chang Pogo, a merchant, rose as an admiral and created the first maritime trading within East Asian countries. During the Goryeo dynasty, sturdy wooden ships were built and used to fight pirates. Korean shipbuilding again excelled during the Imjin war, when Admiral Yi defeated the advancing Japanese fleets.

Today, South Korea is a major nation in the shipbuilding industry, in which its primary competitors are Japan and China. South Korea began prioritizing its shipbuilding industry in the 1970s, and its share of the global shipbuilding market surpassed Japan's, then the world's largest, in the year 2000. South Korea was itself mostly surpassed by China in 2010, though it has occasionally outproduced China since then. The South Korean Navy is acquiring and developing new ships in the hope of obtaining blue-water navy capabilities.

== Three Kingdoms of Korea period ==
Ships were developed and used since the Three Kingdoms of Korea period. Because of the abundance of coastal waters surrounding the Korean peninsula, Koreans developed simple fishing ships to take advantage of the resources.

Baekje, one of the kingdoms, first began expanding its navy and trading products by sea. Baekje also provided the link to spread Buddhism and Korean and Chinese culture to Japan. However, with the rise of Goguryeo's power and Gwanggeto the Great, Baekje's navy was soon defeated near the end of the 4th century Goguryeo also repelled numerous Chinese naval forces during its wars with China. During the Goguryeo-Sui Wars, Goguryeo defeated an invading Chinese fleet in 598, in the Bohai Sea.

== North-South States period ==
After the defeat of Goguryeo with an alliance with Tang China in 668, Silla unified the Korean Peninsula. During this time, Korean culture and philosophy reached its height, and Unified Silla maintained a large trading network with both China and Japan.

Silla, like previous Korean kingdoms, maintained powerful control over its trade routes and oceanic territory as Japanese and Chinese pirates began to harass trade routes over sea. From 828 to 846, however, a Silla merchant named Chang Pogo, rose to prominence and gathered a navy to repel pirates and control Korean trade routes. Chang eventually became a maritime commissioner on Wando Island.

With stable control over maritime rights, Silla prospered in the peace of its rule. However, internal strife weakened it and after wars during the Later Three Kingdoms period, fell to Goryeo in 935.

== Goryeo Dynasty period ==
Korean shipbuilding again excelled during the Goryeo Dynasty. In the 11th century, Goryeo shipbuilders developed the kwason, or spear vessel. These ships were designed to ram and destroy Japanese wokou pirate vessels, which were attacking coastal Korean cities. Goryeo ships were both large and strong in terms of size and durability and the largest could carry 200 or more fighting marines.

Ch'oe Mu-sŏn, a Goryeo scientist, developed Korean cannon in the 14th century. They were soon developed to be used on Goryeo warships and were used with success against the Mongol invasion. About 900 Goryeo ships assisted the Yuan Mongol invasion of Japan in 1281. Only a few Goryeo ships were damaged by the "kamikaze", or divine wind, which wrecked most of the Yuan invasion fleet. In 1380 the Goryeo navy, utilizing its widespread implementation of cannons on board their ships, attacked a large wokou fleet off of the Geum River, which resulted in the near annihilation of the wokou fleet. The world's first naval artillery battle took place off the coast of Korea. In the Battle of Chinpo (1380), 80 Goryeo warships, equipped with firearms invented by Choi Mu-son, sank 500 Japanese wokou ships. Also in 1383, Admiral Jeong Ji destroyed 17 wokou vessels using shipboard cannons. In 1389 a total of 300 waegu ships were destroyed and over a hundred Korean prisoners liberated in a raid on Tsushima ordered by Yi Seonggye.

== Joseon Dynasty period ==
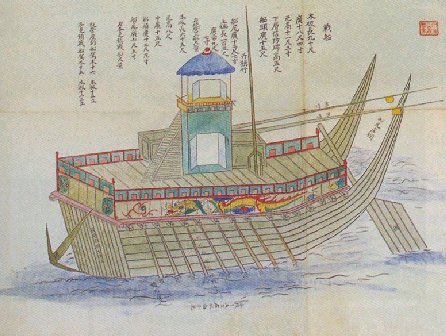
Panokseons were sturdy and powerful battleships superior to the Japanese vessels during the Imjin War.

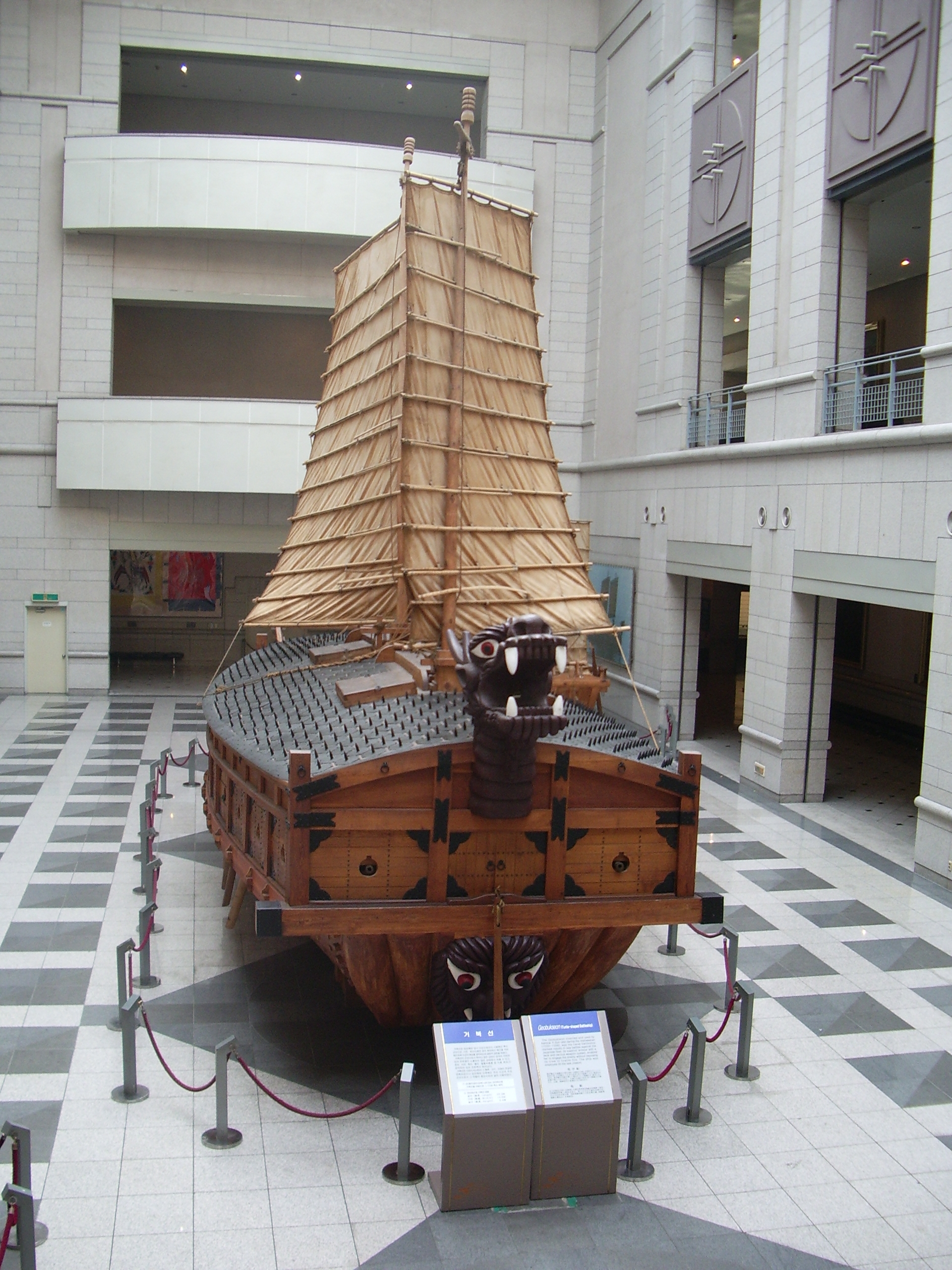
A modern replica of the turtle ship.

Because of the relative peace of the Joseon period, alongside the prioritization of agriculture and Confucian ideals, the Korean military, including the navy, fell into disuse and decay, while fishing ships continued to operate and prosper.

In 1419, King Sejong sent Yi Chongmu to raid Tsushima Island, a wokou pirate hub, in the Oei Invasion in response to wokou raids on Korean coastal cities. Yi took 227 Korean ships and about 17,000 soldiers landed in and attacked settlements on Tsushima, destroying crops, killing islanders and pirates, and plundering ships. The Sō clan, which ruled Tsushima, surrendered and requested to pay tribute. Korea allowed the Sō clan to trade with Korean coastal harbors under the condition that the wokou be suppressed.

Korea eventually developed strong wooden ships called panokseons that came to make up the backbone of the Joseon navy. In the 15th century, under the decree of King Sejong, more powerful cannons were developed and tested. Used on warships, the cannons proved to be a great success during actions against Japanese pirate ships. Panokseons and the Korean navy were most widely used during the Japanese invasions of Korea (1592-1598) when Admiral Yi Sun-sin's brilliant naval strategies defeated many Japanese fleets, contributing to Japan's failure to conquer Korea. Admiral Yi also developed the turtle ship upon an older design.

By the end of 19th century, the Joseon Navy had no significant naval force other than coastal defense fortresses. However, according to the Geunsejoseonjeonggam, both the government and private entities owned a total of 143 steamships. Although there was an attempt to modernize the navy by establishing a royal naval school, the Joseon Navy ended in 1895. In 1903, the government of the Korean Empire purchased its first modern war ship, the KIS Yangmu, from the Japanese Mitsui Corporation for 1,100,000 won, about 30% of Korea's military budget at the time. Korean naval tradition was disrupted after Korea was annexed by the Empire of Japan in 1910.

During the Japanese occupation period (1910-1945), the Imperial Japanese Navy built a naval base (Chinkai Guard District) in southern Korea (at present-day Jinhae).

== Modern Korean navies ==
The modern South Korean Navy has about 70,000 regular personnel including about 29,000 marines and about 160 commissioned ships, mostly built in South Korea. It participates in peacekeeping operations. The South Korean navy plans on becoming a blue-water navy and has been expanding its capabilities by acquiring new ships and by developing experimental vessels under projects like the CVX-class aircraft carrier program.

Not much is known about the North Korean Navy, but it is thought to be vastly inferior to the South's. North Korea's vessels are incapable of traversing the distance between its east and west coasts.

== See also ==
- Republic of Korea Navy
- Military history of Korea
