= Treaty of Kyehae =

1443 treaty between Joseon Korea and the Japanese Sō clan

Japanese name
- Kanji: 嘉吉条約
- Hiragana: かきつじょうやく
Transcriptions
- Revised Hepburn: Kakitsu Jōyaku

Korean name
- Hangul: 계해조약
- Hanja: 癸亥條約
Transcriptions
- Revised Romanization: Gyehae Joyak
- McCune–Reischauer: Kyehae Choyak

The Kyehae Treaty was signed in 1443 ("Kyehae" is the Korean name of the year in the sexagenary cycle) between the Korean Joseon dynasty and the Japanese Sō clan which provided for the supression of wokou pirates, who used Sō owned Tsushima as a base of operations, and legitimized trade between Tsushima and three Korean ports. In Japan, it is called the Kakitsu Treaty (嘉吉条約, Kakitsu Jōyaku); 1443 was the third year of the Japanese Kakitsu era.

== Background ==
Tsushima was then an important trade center. Trade flowed between Korean Goryeo, and the Japanese islands of Tsushima, Iki, and Kyūshū, but halted during the Mongol invasions of Japan between 1274 and 1281, which Goryeo contributed to in its brief time as a Mongol vassal.

Tsushima became a major base for the wokou, along with Iki and Matsuura. Repeated wokou raids led Goryeo, and subsequently Joseon, to placate them by establishing trade agreements and negotiating with the Ashikaga shogunate and its deputy in Kyūshū, as well as using force to neutralize them. In 1389, General Pak Wi (朴威) of Goryeo attempted to clear Tsushima of wokou, but uprisings in Korea forced him to return home.

On June 19, 1419, the recently abdicated King Taejong of Joseon sent General Yi Chongmu on an expedition to Tsushima to clear it of wokou, using a fleet of 227 vessels and 17,000 soldiers known in Japan as the Ōei Invasion. The army returned to Korea on July 3, 1419, and Korea gave up occupation of Tsushima.

== Terms ==
This treaty was signed by Joseon King Sejong the Great and daimyō of the Sō clan Sō Sadamori in 1443. The Sō clan was granted a substantial stipend from the Joseon government and the right to conduct fifty ships' worth of trade with Joseon per year in exchange for their aid in stopping wokou raids on Joseon ports. The treaty was discarded by the revolt of the Sampo in 1510.

== See also ==
- List of treaties
- Ōei Invasion
- Pyŏn Hyomun
