= Sakoku =

Isolationist policy of Japan (1633–1853)

Sakoku (Japanese: 鎖国; IPA: [sa̠ko̞kɯ̟]; lit. 'locked country') was the isolationist foreign policy of the Japanese Tokugawa shogunate under which, during the Edo period (from 1603 to 1867), relations and trade between Japan and other countries were severely limited, and almost all foreign nationals were banned from entering Japan, while common Japanese people were kept from leaving the country. The policy was enacted by the shogunate government (bakufu) under Tokugawa Iemitsu through a number of edicts and policies from 1633 to 1639.

Japan was not completely isolated under the sakoku policy. Sakoku was a system in which strict regulations were placed on commerce and foreign relations by the shogunate and certain feudal domains (han). There was extensive trade with China through the port of Nagasaki, in the far west of Japan, with a residential area for the Chinese. The policy stated that the only European influence permitted was the Dutch factory at Dejima in Nagasaki. Western scientific, technical and medical innovations flowed into Japan through Rangaku ("Dutch learning").

Trade with Korea was limited to the Tsushima Domain, today part of Nagasaki Prefecture, and the wakan in Choryang, part of present-day Busan. There were also diplomatic exchanges done through the Joseon Tongsinsa from Korea. Trade with the Ainu people was limited to the Matsumae Domain in Hokkaido, and trade with the Ryūkyū Kingdom took place in Satsuma Domain (present-day Kagoshima Prefecture). Apart from these direct commercial contacts in peripheral provinces, trading countries sent regular missions to the shōgun in Edo and at Osaka Castle.

The policy ended after 1853 when the Perry Expedition commanded by Matthew C. Perry forced the opening of Japan to American, and by extension, Western trade through a series of treaties, called the Convention of Kanagawa.

== Etymology ==
The term sakoku originates from the manuscript work Sakoku-ron (鎖國論) written by Japanese astronomer and translator Shizuki Tadao in 1801. Shizuki invented the word while translating the works of the 17th-century German traveller Engelbert Kaempfer, namely his book 'the history of Japan', posthumously released in 1727.

Text from the seclusion edict of 1636

No Japanese ship ... nor any native of Japan, shall presume to go out of the country; whoever acts contrary to this, shall die, and the ship with the crew and goods aboard shall be sequestered until further orders. All persons who return from abroad shall be put to death. Whoever discovers a Christian priest shall have a reward of 400 to 500 sheets of silver and for every Christian in proportion. All Namban (Portuguese and Spanish) who propagate the doctrine of the Catholics, or bear this scandalous name, shall be imprisoned in the Onra, or common jail of the town. The whole race of the Portuguese with their mothers, nurses and whatever belongs to them, shall be banished to Macao. Whoever presumes to bring a letter from abroad, or to return after he hath been banished, shall die with his family; also whoever presumes to intercede for him, shall be put to death. No nobleman nor any soldier shall be suffered to purchase anything from the foreigner.

—

== Rationale ==
Text from Engelbert Kaempfer, on visiting Japan

They (the Japanese) are strictly and strongly guarded, from the inside and outside by various guards, treating us (the Dutch) not like honest men, but like criminals, traitors, spies, prisoners, or, to say the least, hostages of the Shogun. This jail goes by the name of Dejima.

—

It is conventionally regarded that the shogunate imposed and enforced the sakoku policy in order to remove the colonial and religious influence of primarily Spain and Portugal, which were perceived as posing a threat to the stability of the shogunate and to peace in the archipelago. The increasing number of Catholic converts in southern Japan (mainly Kyūshū) was a significant element of that which was seen as a threat. Based on work conducted by Japanese historians in the 1970s, some scholars have challenged this view, believing it to be only a partial explanation of political reality.

Before the Tokugawa, Toyotomi Hideyoshi had previously begun to turn against the European missionaries after the Spanish conquest of the Philippines began, and the gradual progress of the Spanish there led to increasing hostility from the Tokugawa as well.

The motivations for the gradual strengthening of the maritime prohibitions during the early 17th century should be considered within the context of the Tokugawa bakufu's domestic agenda. One element of this agenda was to acquire sufficient control over Japan's foreign policy so as to not only guarantee social peace, but also to maintain Tokugawa supremacy over the other powerful lords in the country, particularly the tozama daimyō.

These daimyō had used East Asian trading linkages to profitable effect during the Sengoku period, which allowed them to build up their military strength as well. By restricting the ability of the daimyō to trade with foreign ships coming to Japan or pursue trade opportunities overseas, the Tokugawa bakufu could ensure none would become powerful enough to challenge the bakufu's supremacy. This is consistent with the generally agreed rationale for the Tokugawa bakufu's implementation of the system of alternate attendance, or sankin-kōtai.

Directing trade predominantly through Nagasaki, which came under Toyotomi Hideyoshi's control in 1587, would enable the bakufu, through taxes and levies, to bolster its own treasury. This was no small matter, as lack of wealth had limited both the preceding Kamakura bakufu and the Muromachi bakufu in crucial ways. The focus on the removal of Western and Christian influence from the Japanese archipelago as the main driver of the kaikin has been argued to be a somewhat eurocentric reading of Japanese history, although it is a common perception among westerners.

Nevertheless, Christianity and the two colonial powers it was most strongly associated with were seen as genuine threats by the Tokugawa bakufu. Once the remnants of the Toyotomi clan had been defeated in 1615, shogun Tokugawa Hidetada, as well as his retired yet still-influential father, Tokugawa Ieyasu, turned their attention to the sole remaining credible challenge to Tokugawa supremacy. Religious challenges to central authority were taken seriously by the bakufu as ecclesiastical challenges by armed Buddhist monks were common during the sengoku period. The Empress Meishō (r. 1629–1643) also had grave doubts when she heard about how the Spanish and Portuguese were invading and colonising in the New World, and thought that Japan would soon become one of the many countries in their possession.

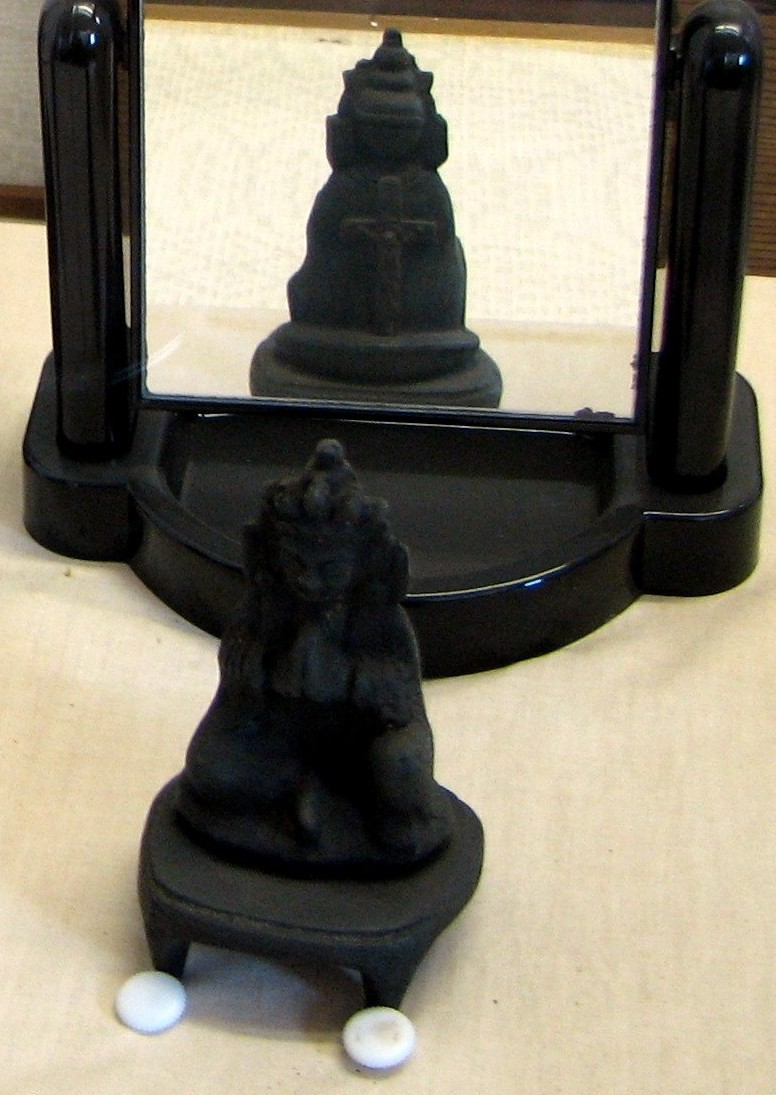
A Buddhist statue with a hidden crucifix on the back, used by Christians in Japan to hide their real beliefs

Protestant English and Dutch traders reinforced this perception by accusing the Spanish and Portuguese missionaries of spreading the religion systematically, as part of a claimed policy of culturally dominating and colonizing Asian countries. The Dutch and English were generally seen by the Japanese to be able to separate religion and trade, while their Iberian counterparts were looked upon with much suspicion. The Dutch, who were at war with the Spanish and eager to take over trade from both the Spanish and Portuguese, had no problems reinforcing this view.

The number of Christians in Japan had been steadily rising due to the efforts of missionaries, such as Francis Xavier and daimyō converts. The direct trigger which is said to have spurred the imposition of sakoku was the Shimabara Rebellion of 1637–38, an uprising of 40,000 mostly Christian peasants. In the aftermath, the shogunate accused missionaries of instigating the rebellion, expelled them from the country, and strictly banned the religion on penalty of death. The remaining Japanese Christians, mostly in Nagasaki, formed underground communities and came to be called Kakure Kirishitan.

All contact with the outside world became strictly regulated by the shogunate, or by the domains (Tsushima, Matsumae, and Satsuma) assigned to the task. Dutch traders were permitted to continue commerce in Japan only by agreeing not to engage in missionary activities. Today, the Christian percentage of the population (1%) in Japan remains far lower than in other East Asian countries such as China (3%), Vietnam (7%), and South Korea (29%).

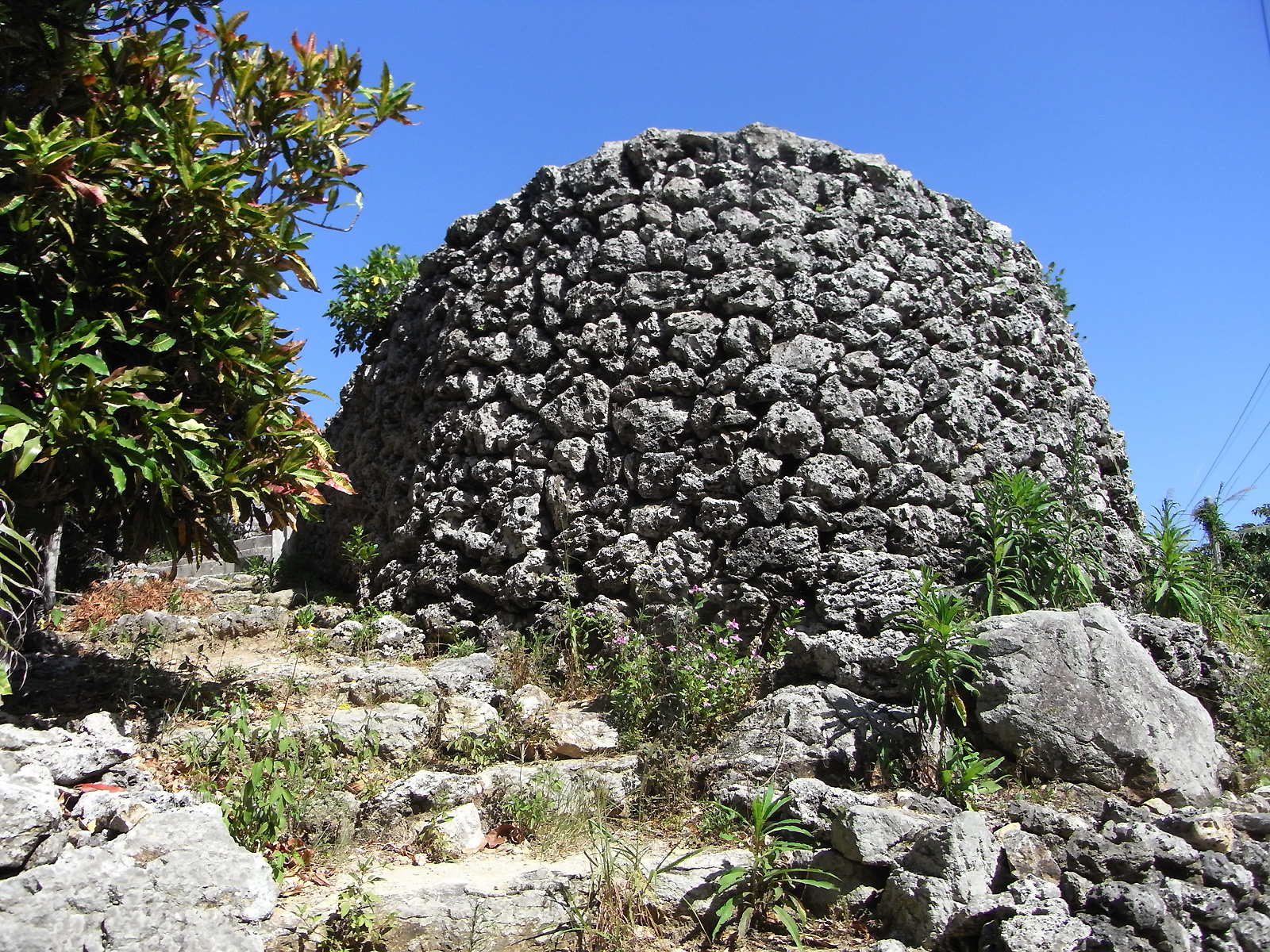
A beacon on Taketomi, one of the Sakishima Beacons constructed in 1644 to monitor foreign shipping

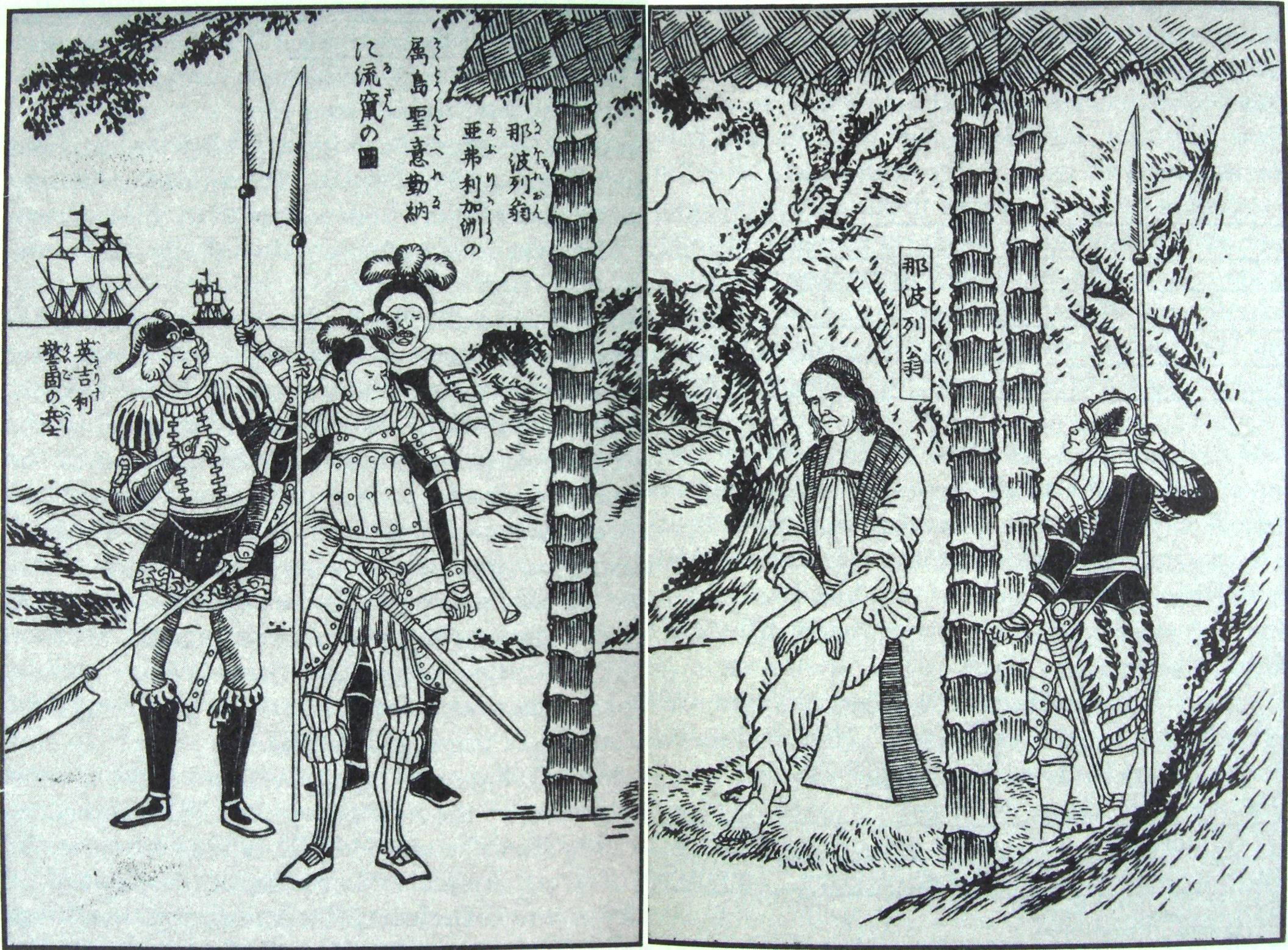
A Japanese woodcut of Napoleon in captivity on Saint Helena (1815). The Japanese were so isolated that the artist depicted these British soldiers wearing the armor and weapons of 16th century Portuguese.

The sakoku policy was also a way of controlling commerce between Japan and other nations, as well as asserting its new place in the East Asian hierarchy. The Tokugawa had set out to create their own small-scale international system where Japan could continue to access the trade in essential commodities such as medicines, and gain access to essential intelligence about happenings in China while avoiding having to agree to a subordinate status within the Chinese tributary system.

Japan's generally constructive official diplomatic relationship with Joseon Korea allowed regular embassies (Tongsinsa) to be dispatched by Korea to Japan. Together with the brisk trade between Tsushima and Korea, as well as the presence of Japanese in the Busan wakan, Japan was able to access Chinese cultural, intellectual and technological developments throughout the Edo period. At the time of the promulgation of the strictest versions of the maritime prohibitions, the Ming dynasty had lost control of much of China and it was unnecessary, and perhaps undesirable, for Japan to pursue official diplomatic relations with either of the Ming or the Qing governments while the issue of imperial legitimacy was unsettled.

Japan was able to acquire the imported goods it required through intermediary trade with the Dutch and through the Ryukyu Islands. The Japanese actually encouraged the Ryūkyū Kingdom's rulers to maintain a tributary relationship with China, even though the Shimazu clan had surreptitiously established great political influence in the Ryukyu Islands. The Qing became much more open to trade after it had defeated the Ming loyalists in Taiwan, and thus Japan's rulers felt even less need to establish official relations with China.

Liberalizing challenges to sakoku came from within Japan's elite in the 18th century, but they came to nothing. Later on, the sakoku policy was the main safeguard against the total depletion of Japanese mineral resources—such as silver and copper—to the outside world. However, while silver exportation through Nagasaki was controlled by the shogunate to the point of stopping all exportation, the exportation of silver through Korea continued in relatively high quantities.

The way Japan kept abreast of Western technology during this period was by studying medical and other texts in the Dutch language obtained through trade at Dejima. This developed into a blossoming field in the late 18th century which was known as Rangaku (Dutch studies). It became obsolete after the country was opened and the sakoku policy collapsed. Thereafter, many Japanese students (e.g., Kikuchi Dairoku) were sent to study in foreign countries, and many foreign employees were employed in Japan (see o-yatoi gaikokujin).

The policies associated with sakoku ended with the Convention of Kanagawa in response to demands made by Commodore Perry in 1854.

== Terminology ==
Trade prospered during the sakoku period, and though relations and trade were restricted to certain ports, the country was far from closed. Even as the shogunate expelled all non-Dutch Europeans, they simultaneously engaged in discussions with Dutch and Korean representatives to ensure that the overall volume of trade did not suffer.

Thus, it has become increasingly common in scholarship in recent decades to refer to the foreign relations policy of the period not as sakoku, implying a totally secluded, isolated, and "closed" country, but by the term kaikin (海禁, lit. "maritime prohibitions") used in documents at the time, and derived from the similar Chinese concept haijin.

== History ==
=== Trade during the period ===
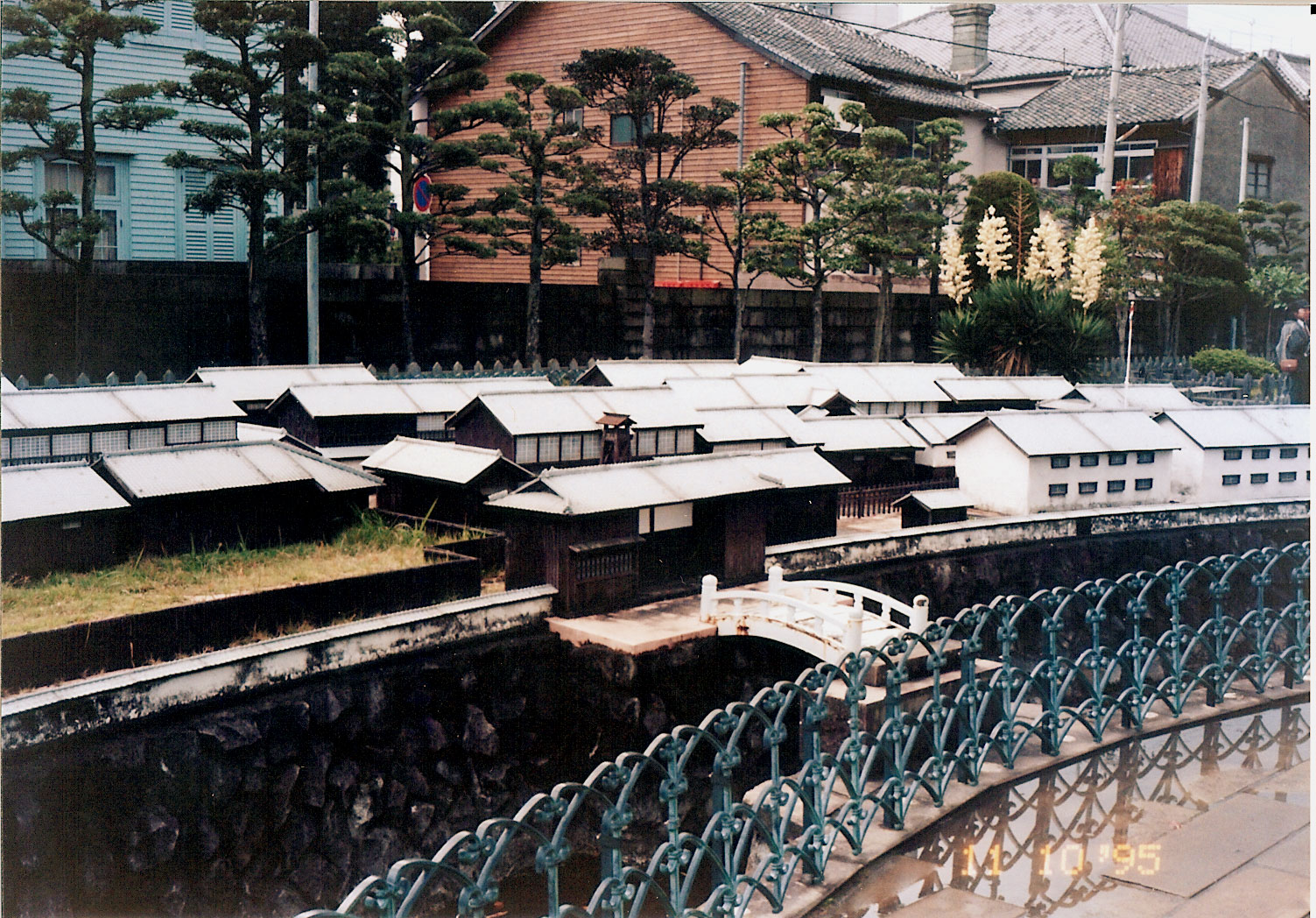
A model of the Dutch trading post on Dejima Island

During the sakoku period, Japan traded with five entities, through four "gateways". The largest was the private Chinese trade at Nagasaki (who also traded with the Ryūkyū Kingdom), where the Dutch East India Company was also permitted to operate. The Matsumae clan domain in Hokkaido (then called Ezo) traded with the Ainu people. Through the Sō clan daimyō of Tsushima, there were relations with Joseon-dynasty Korea. Ryūkyū, a semi-independent kingdom for nearly all of the Edo period, was controlled by the Shimazu clan daimyō of Satsuma Domain.

Tashiro Kazui has shown that trade between Japan and these entities was divided into two kinds: Group A in which he places China and the Dutch, "whose relations fell under the direct jurisdiction of the Bakufu at Nagasaki" and Group B, represented by the Korean Kingdom and the Ryūkyū Kingdom, "who dealt with Tsushima (the Sō clan) and Satsuma (the Shimazu clan) domains respectively".

Many items traded from Japan to Korea and the Ryūkyū Kingdom were eventually shipped to China. In the Ryūkyū Islands and Korea, the clans in charge of trade built trading towns outside Japanese territory where commerce actually took place. Due to the necessity for Japanese subjects to travel to and from these trading posts, this resembled something of an outgoing trade, with Japanese subjects making regular contact with foreign traders in essentially extraterritorial land.

Commerce with Chinese and Dutch traders in Nagasaki took place on an island called Dejima, separated from the city by a narrow strait; foreigners could not enter Nagasaki from Dejima, nor could Japanese civilians enter Dejima without special permission or authorization. For the island's inhabitants, conditions on Dejima were humiliating; the police of Nagasaki could harass them at will, and at all times a strong Japanese guard was stationed on the narrow bridge to the mainland in order to prevent them from leaving the island.

=== Challenges to seclusion ===
During the 17th, 18th, and 19th centuries, several Western powers attempted to establish diplomatic or trade relations with Japan, but many of these efforts were rejected by the Tokugawa shogunate.

In 1640, the Macau embassy was sent by the Portuguese to convince the shogunate to reverse their expulsion and resume trade. However, the envoys were captured, their ship was burnt, and 61 members of the mission were executed on August 4 by order of the bakufu. A subsequent attempt by Portuguese warships to enter Nagasaki in 1647 was met with a blockade of nearly 900 Japanese vessels, prompting the shogunate to further bolster coastal defenses. Later in 1671, the British also attempted to open trade relations but were refused a license.

Russian expeditions reached Japanese waters during the 18th century. In 1738, a naval squadron led by Martin Spanberg visited Honshu, landing near present-day Rikuchu Kaigan National Park, and conducted further voyages in 1739 and 1742 to advance Russian interests in the Kurils. In 1778, merchant Pavel Lebedev-Lastochkin arrived in Hokkaido seeking trade, but his request was denied. French explorer Jean-François de Galaup, comte de Lapérouse also navigated Japanese waters in 1787, visiting the Ryūkyū Islands and charting La Pérouse Strait.

American and Russian attempts to establish relations with Japan continued in the late 18th and early 19th centuries. In 1791, explorer John Kendrick stopped at Kii Ōshima aboard the Lady Washington alongside the Grace, marking the first recorded American visit to Japan. Following visits by Russian subject Adam Laxman in 1792, several American vessels traded at Nagasaki under the Dutch flag between 1797 and 1809 due to the Napoleonic Wars. Direct trade requests, such as those by Russian envoy Nikolai Rezanov in 1804 and American captain John Derby, were rejected. Rezanov's rejection was followed by Russian attacks on Sakhalin and the Kuril Islands, which prompted the shogunate to strengthen defenses in Ezo.

A series of maritime incidents in the early 19th century—including the British HMS Phaeton incident in 1808, the arrest of Russian officer Vasily Golovnin in 1811, and the 1830 arrival of mutineers aboard the British brig Cyprus—contributed to stricter enforcement of seclusion policies. Prompted by Takahashi Kageyasu, the shogunate issued the "Order to Drive Away Foreign Ships" (Ikokusen uchiharairei) in 1825, instructing coastal authorities to arrest or kill landing foreigners. This policy was enforced during the 1837 Morrison Incident, when an unarmed American merchant ship attempting to return Japanese castaways (including Otokichi) was fired upon.

Following news of China's defeat in the Opium War and internal criticism over the Morrison Incident, the bakufu relaxed its policy in 1842 by issuing the "Order for the Provision of Firewood and Water" (Shinsui kyuyorei). Foreign contacts continued through various expeditions: a French mission to Okinawa in 1844, a brief visit to Edo Bay by American whaling captain Mercator Cooper in 1845, and an unsuccessful trade attempt by Commander James Biddle in 1846. Meanwhile, Ranald MacDonald entered Japan illegally in 1848, later teaching English to Japanese translators in Nagasaki.

In 1849, HMS Mariner surveyed Uraga Harbour with the assistance of Otokichi. In 1853, a Russian embassy under Yevfimy Putyatin demonstrated a steam engine in Nagasaki, which coincided with early Japanese efforts to study steam technology, including work by Tanaka Hisashige.

On July 8, 1853, Commodore Matthew Perry of the U.S. Navy arrived in Edo Bay with four warships, commonly referred to as Western kurofune or Black Ships. Perry's expedition placed considerable pressure on the shogunate to establish formal relations with the United States, leading to negotiations that culminated in the Treaty of Kanagawa in 1854.

=== End of isolationism ===
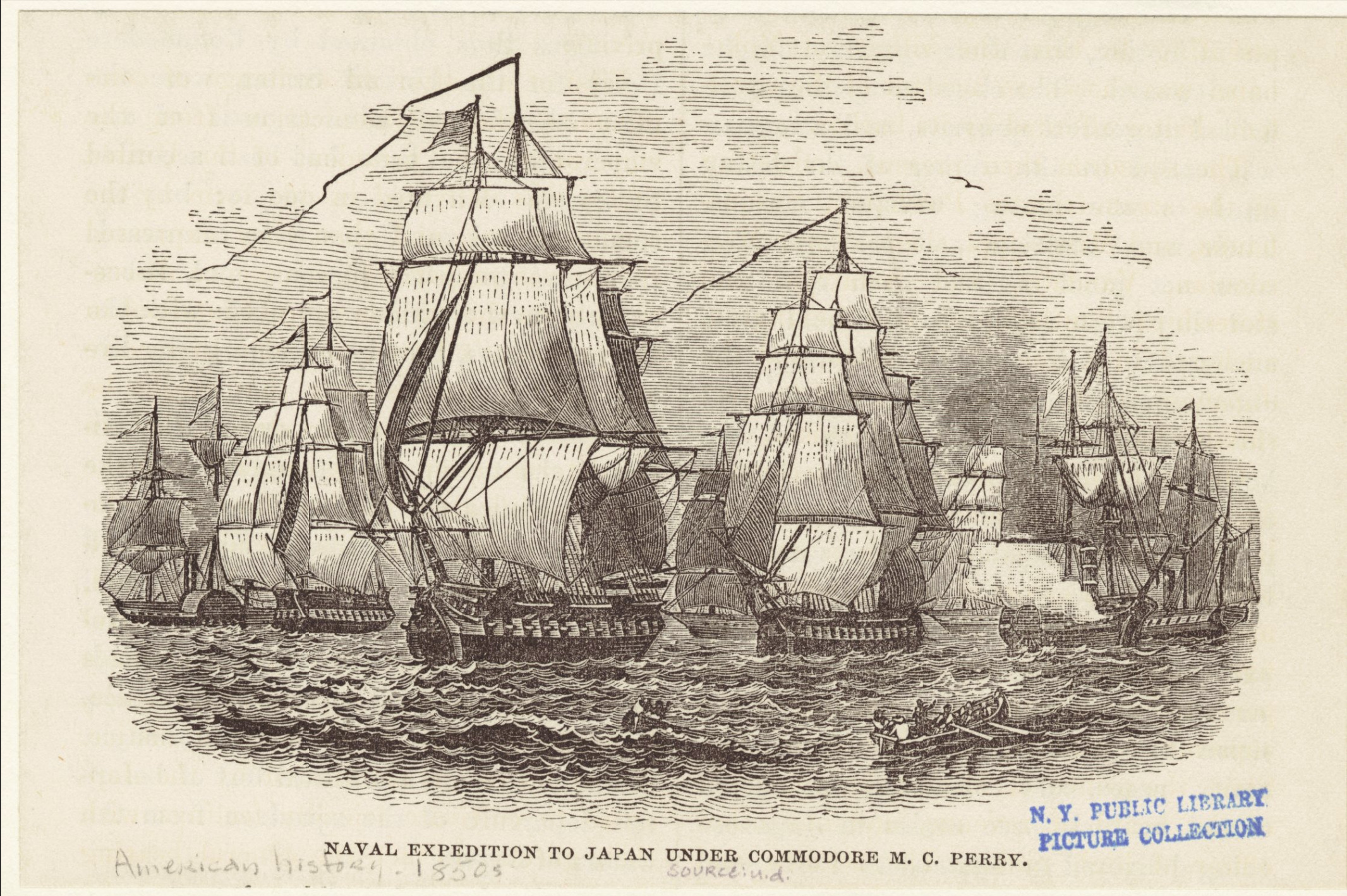
Commodore Matthew C. Perry's fleet on his second visit to Japan in 1854

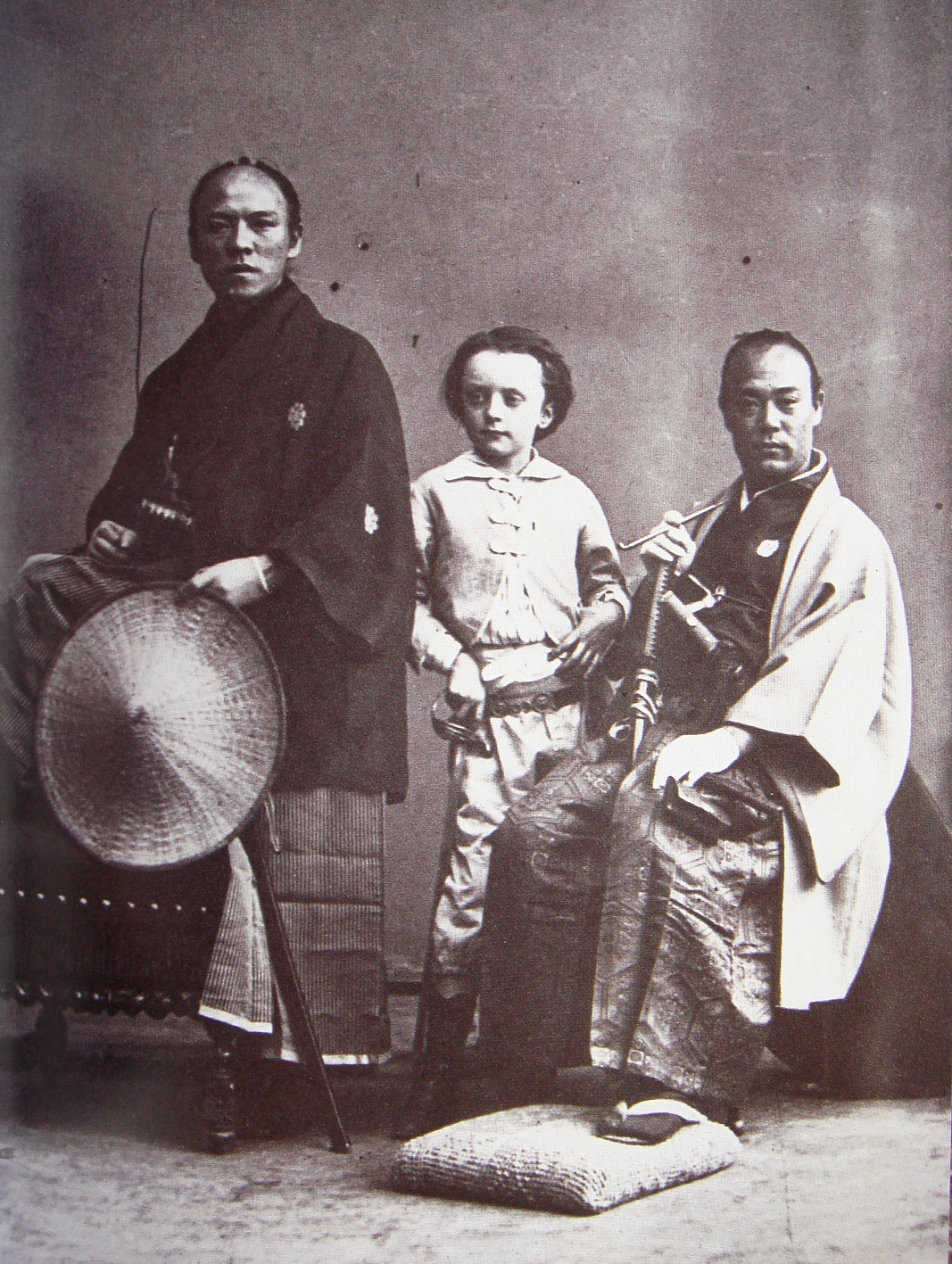
The son of Nadar, photographed with members of the Second Japanese Embassy to Europe in 1863. Photographed by Nadar.

The following year, at the Convention of Kanagawa (March 31, 1854), Perry returned with eight ships and forced the Shogun to sign the "Treaty of Peace and Amity", establishing formal diplomatic relations between Japan and the United States. The United Kingdom signed the Anglo-Japanese Friendship Treaty at the end of 1854.

Between 1852 and 1855, Admiral Yevfimiy Putyatin of the Russian Navy made several attempts to obtain from the Shogun favourable trade terms for Russia. In June 1853, he brought to Nagasaki Bay a letter from the Foreign Minister Karl Nesselrode and demonstrated to Tanaka Hisashige a steam engine, probably the first ever seen in Japan. His efforts culminated in the signing of the Treaty of Shimoda in February 1855.

Within five years, Japan had signed similar treaties with other western countries. The Harris Treaty was signed with the United States on July 29, 1858. These "Ansei Treaties" were widely regarded by Japanese intellectuals as unequal, having been forced on Japan through gunboat diplomacy, and as a sign of the West's desire to incorporate Japan into the imperialism that had been taking hold of the continent. Among other measures, they gave the Western nations unequivocal control of tariffs on imports and the right of extraterritoriality to all their visiting nationals. They would remain a sticking point in Japan's relations with the West up to the turn of the 20th century.

Several missions were sent abroad by the bakufu, in order to learn about Western civilization, revise treaties, and delay the opening of cities and harbours to foreign trade.

A Japanese Embassy to the United States was sent in 1860, on-board the Kanrin Maru.

In the 1861 Tsushima Incident, a Russian fleet tried to force open a harbour not officially opened to foreign trade with foreign countries, but it was repelled with the help of the British.

An Embassy to Europe was sent in 1862, and a Second Embassy to Europe in 1863. Japan also sent a delegation and participated to the 1867 World Fair in Paris.

Other missions, distinct from those of the Shogunate, were also sent to Europe, such as the Chōshū Five, and missions by the fief of Satsuma.

== Similar policies ==
China under the Ming and Qing dynasties as well as Joseon had implemented isolationist policies before Japan did, starting with the Ming implementing Haijin from 1371. Unlike sakoku, foreign influences outside East Asia were banned by the Chinese and Koreans as well, while Rangaku allowed Western ideas other than Christianity to be studied in Japan.

China was forced to open up in the Treaty of Nanking and in subsequent treaties, following its defeat in the First Opium War. Joseon, which had developed a reputation as a hermit kingdom, was forced out of isolationism by Japan in the Japan–Korea Treaty of 1876, making use of gunboat diplomacy which had been used by the United States to force Japan to open up.

Paraguay under the rule of Dictator José Gaspar Rodriguez de Francia in 1814–1840 also had a similar isolationist policy. This ended, although gradually, during the governments of Carlos Antonio López and Francisco Solano López.

Prior to the 1970 Omani coup d'état, under the rule of Sultan Said bin Taimur, foreign relations of Oman were severely limited, though Oman opened its foreign policy after the coup & the eventual procession of Sultan Qaboos bin Said.

== See also ==
- Convention of Kanagawa – 1854 US–Tokugawa shogunate treaty
- Dutch missions to Edo
- Haijin – Isolationist policy in early modern China
- Joseon missions to Japan – Korea to Japan diplomacy
- List of Westerners who visited Japan before 1868
- Ryukyuan missions to Edo – Historical diplomatic missions in present-day Japan
- Sakoku Edict of 1635 – Japanese law against foreign influence
- San Felipe incident (1596) – Spanish shipwreck in Japan with political consequences
