= Waegwan (enclave) =

Japanese ethnic enclaves in Korea

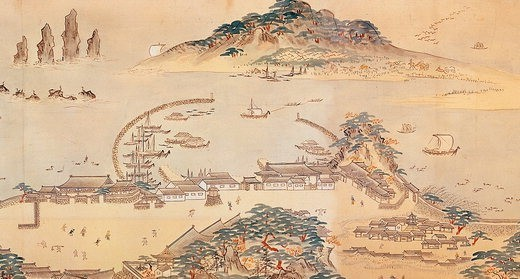
Landscape of the Choryang Waegwan (草梁倭館) in Busan, 18th century

Waegwan (Korean: 왜관; Hanja: 倭館; lit. 'Japanese house'; pronounced [wɛgwan]), also known as wakan (Japanese: 和館; Hir: わかん), were Japanese ethnic enclaves (nihonmachi) primarily located in southern coastal cities of the Koreanic state Joseon. They existed from around the 15th century until the late 19th century. Along with general Japanese trade with Korea they were managed by the Tsushima-Fuchū Domain during the Azuchi–Momoyama and Edo periods.

In the middle Joseon period, they served as important trading hubs. In the late Joseon period, the only remaining waegwan in Busan became a de facto extraterritorial enclave, as Japanese diplomats were forbidden to negotiate in Seoul.

== History ==
=== Medieval waegwan ===
Unlike the Ming dynasty's policy of haijin (restricting maritime trade), Korea permitted free entry of ships into its ports. As a result, trade between the Joseon and Japanese feudal lords increased rapidly. When Joseon harbors became targets for wokou pirates, in 1407, King Taejong restricted Japanese ships to the ports of Busan, Naei, and Yeom. By 1410, all forms of Japanese communication, including entrance of envoys and messengers, known to Koreans as Chŏbwae (접왜; 接倭), were also restricted to these ports. Originally intended only as a stop for Japanese ships, these ports soon became hotspots for Japanese residents and their families, primarily arriving from Tsushima Island, forming the first waegwan ethnic enclaves called sampo (삼포; 三浦; lit. 'three ports').

In 1419, the Ōei Invasion by wokou pirates forced the sampo waegwan to shut down, but they were soon re-opened. Over time, Japanese residents who were not naturalized Korean citizens became known as kokyowa (恒居倭, 'permanent Japanese'), and titles like atama (頭, 'head') were given to waegwan leaders. Due to overpopulation some kokyowa lived outside of waegwan boundaries, intermingling with local Korean villagers and engaged in fishing and agriculture, some in smuggling. Joseon attempts to monitor these residents, such as sending Korean officials to keep watch over daily merchant activities often failed. Taxation attempts also yielded mixed results forcing Korean authorities to put more pressure on the kokyowa.

When King Jungjong of Joseon succeeded his half-brother Yeonsangun to the throne in 1506, the Korean government implemented reforms that included the elimination of tax breaks for Japanese citizens. Tensions climaxed during the Disturbance of the Three Ports, when Japanese nationals and the ruling Sō clan of Tsushima captured Naei port and held its mayor Kim Sae-gyun (김세균; 金世鈞) hostage. The rebellion was quickly stamped out and King Jungjong ordered the shutdown of the sampo waegwan, though they would be reopened after the Treaty of Imsin. Diplomacy between Japan and Korea would be officially severed following Hideyoshi Toyotomi's invasion of Korea in 1592, leading to the permanent end of the sampo waegwan.

==== Busan-po waegwan ====
The waegwan of Busan-po (부산포; 富山浦) was located in present-day Dong District of Busan. It was the oldest of the sampo waegwans; about 450 Japanese lived there in 1492. It was shut down in 1510 but was reopened in 1521, and existed until the invasions of Korea in 1592. Although two new waegwans would be established in Busan, the site of the old Busan-po waegwan would be subsumed into a prefectural military base.

==== Naei-po waegwan ====
The waegwan of Naei-po (내이포; 乃而浦) was located in present-day Jinhae-gu District of Changwon. The Japanese population in Naei was largest of all waegwan reaching over 2,500 in 1494. An attempt was made by the Joseon to deport excess Japanese, but the numbers rebounded. Naei was hit hardest in the Disturbance and was shut down in 1510 but was reopened in 1521; it was closed again due to the Jiajing wokou raids in 1544 during the Treaty of Chŏngsa (정사약조; 丁巳約條) and was never reopened.

==== Yeom-po waegwan ====
The waegwan of Yeom-po (염포; 鹽浦) was located in present-day Jung District in Ulsan. Located on the south bank across the bay from Ulsan's old town, it was re-opened in 1426 following the Oei Invasions, with 150 Japanese living by 1494; after the Disturbance, the waegwan closed in 1510 and never reopened.

==== Seoul Waegwan ====
There was a small Japanese enclave in the Joseon capital Hanseong (modern day Seoul), though it was not a permanent settlement and was purely an accommodation facility for ambassadors and merchants. It was located in present-day Jung District, Seoul. The Japanese quarters was called the dongpyeonggwan (東平館; lit. 'eastern peace house'), established in 1409 and shut down in 1592. During the Japanese occupation of Korea in the 20th century, the old settlement site was called Yamato-cho (大和町).

=== Late Joseon waegwan ===
Joseon Korea and the Tokugawa Shogunate struggled to re-establish relationships in the immediate aftermath of the late 16th century Japanese invasions. Attempts were made by Tsushima Domain emissaries to re-kindle relationships, but were sent back. Ultimately, however, King Seonjo acquiesced and established a temporary waegwan on Jeolyeong Island, in present-day Yeongdo District, Busan in 1601. In 1607, a new, formal waegwan in Dumo-po was constructed. In 1609, King Gwanghaegun signed the Treaty of Kiyū, which re-established diplomacy between the two nations. Among its stipulations, Tsushima island became, de facto vassal state of Korea.

Although the waegwan of Dumo-po was re-established, no Japanese were allowed to leave its premises. Even still, the Tsushima-born waegwan residents proved irritable and prone to violence. Especially starkly Japanese accused the Joseon state of coercively subjecting kokyowa to Joseon criminal law. At least eleven cases of illegal prostitution over waegwan borders caused serious diplomatic issues between Tsushima and Korea. These diplomatic incidents, in addition to complaints by Japanese residents themselves and a threat by their influence over local government offices and bribery of Joseon officials, caused Dongnae Magistrate Kwon I-jin (權以鎭) to move the Japanese to Choryang in 1678.

==== Dumo-po waegwan ====
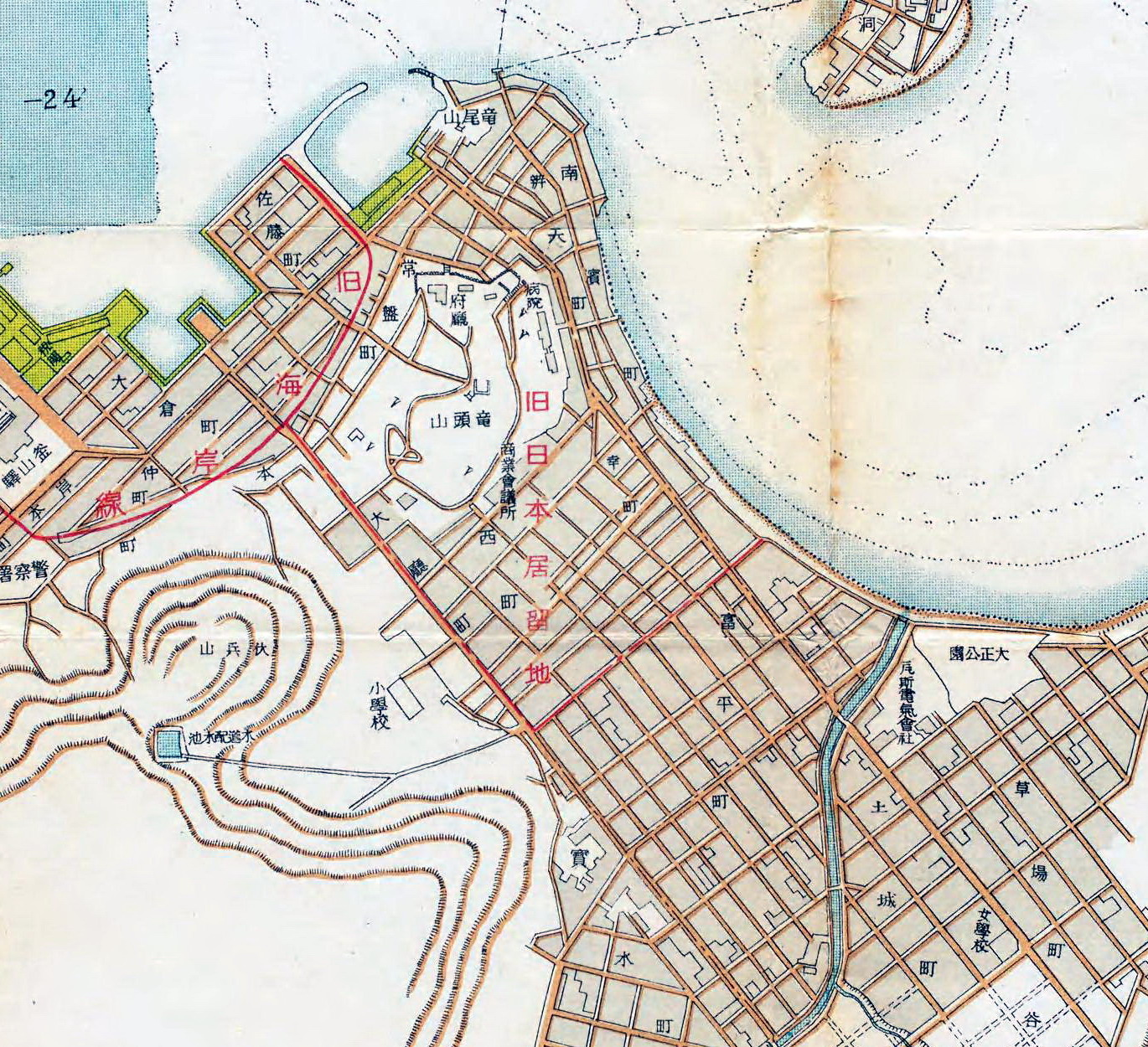
Map of pre-war Busan. The site of the Choryang waegwan is named the "Old Japanese Settlement" (旧日本居留地).

The waegwan of Dumo-po (두모포; 豆毛浦) was located in Jwacheon-dong, Busan. Established in 1607, 500 Japanese from Tsushima inaugurated the opening of the new settlement. It was also called kowakan (古倭館, 'old wakan') as the location of the waegwan was moved in 1678, over complaints that Jwacheon was too narrow and had a lack of dock facilities. Tsushima-Fuchū oversaw the construction of facilities like Tōkō-ji (東向寺) temple, guest quarters, izakayas, and more, centered around a banquet hall, the Yŏnhyangdaech'ŏng (연향대청; 宴享大廳).

==== Choryang waegwan ====
The waegwan of Choryang (초량; 草粱) was located in present-day Yongdusan Park, Jung-gu, Busan. Also known as the shinwakan (Japanese: 新倭館, lit: 'new wakan'), the settlement, established in 1678, was expanded more than ten times from the old site at Dumo-po, and was twenty-five times larger than the Dutch trading post of Dejima on the Japanese coast. Apart facilities from the old settlement, trading centers, courthouses, and a new Benzaiten shrine was constructed.

About 400-500 people lived in Choryang at any given time; only the daimyō of Tsushima and his staff were allowed to stay on waegwan grounds, along with a handful of Japanese merchants and peddlers. International students studying medicine and Korean culture were also permitted to live. Choryang became a center for traditional Chinese medicine, and doctors flocked to learn acupuncture, surgery, and moxibustion.

=== End of the waegwan, beginning of the concession ===
In 1867, a member of the Sō daimyō held a meeting with Heungseon Daewongun of Korea, informing him of the establishment of the Meiji government. As part of Emperor Meiji's reforms, the han system was abolished and was replaced with prefectures. With Tsushima-Fuchū Domain's power gone, the Japanese Prime Minister of Foreign Affairs requested to take over the Choryang waegwan and transfer it over to the Ministry of Foreign Affairs in 1869. The correspondence also used the character ko 皇, rather than taikun 大君 to refer to the Japanese emperor. The Koreans only used this character (皇) to refer to the Chinese emperor, which implied ceremonial superiority to Joseon ruler. By using it Japanese would make the Korean monarch a vassal or subject of the Japanese. Nonetheless, the Koreans refused to hand the settlement over, inflaming the debate of Seikanron in Japan proper.

As a result, while punitive expedition against Korea was decided against, the Ganghwa Island incident of 1875 asserted Japanese military might over the so-called "hermit kingdom" of Joseon Korea. The subsequent Japan–Korea Treaty of 1876, above all else, was an unequal treaty that established Japanese supremacy over Korea. For the Choryang waegwan, the settlement was abolished and re-established as the Busan Japanese Concession (일본 전관 거류지; 日本專管居留地), which later served as an important military entrepôt during and after the annexation of Korea established by the Japan–Korea Treaty of 1910.

== Trade ==
During the medieval ages, Japan exported goods such as gold, sulfur, copper, fragrant sappanwood, and Ryukyu pepper, while Korea traded in Bombax ceiba (kapok) wood and cotton. Such goods flowed through the sampo waegwan, though by the Edo period, kapok no longer needed to be imported. Buddhist books and works like the tripiṭaka canons were also shipped from Korea into Japan.

Following the Japanese invasions of Korea, Japan also began exporting silver, while Korean products like tiger skins and ginseng root became popular in Japan. Moreover, as Ming China shut down commercial maritime trade with Japan over wokou raids, the waegwan traded a higher number of Chinese products like raw silk and silk fabrics through Korea due to its tributary relationship to China. As the quality of Japanese silks were poor at the time, the Sō daimyo of Tsushima monopolized the silk trade, becoming one of the wealthiest tozama daimyō in post-feudal Japan.

After the 17th century, waegwan trade began to decline considerably as Japanese silk quality improved and ginseng farming became profitable in Japan. Instead, waegwan became hubs for general commercial as well as intellectual activity.

== See also ==
- Busan Japanese Concession – the political successor to the Choryang waegwan
- Nihonmachi
- History of Japan–Korea relations
