= Jangdo =

Island and park in Yeosu, South Korea

- Ungcheon Jangdo Park
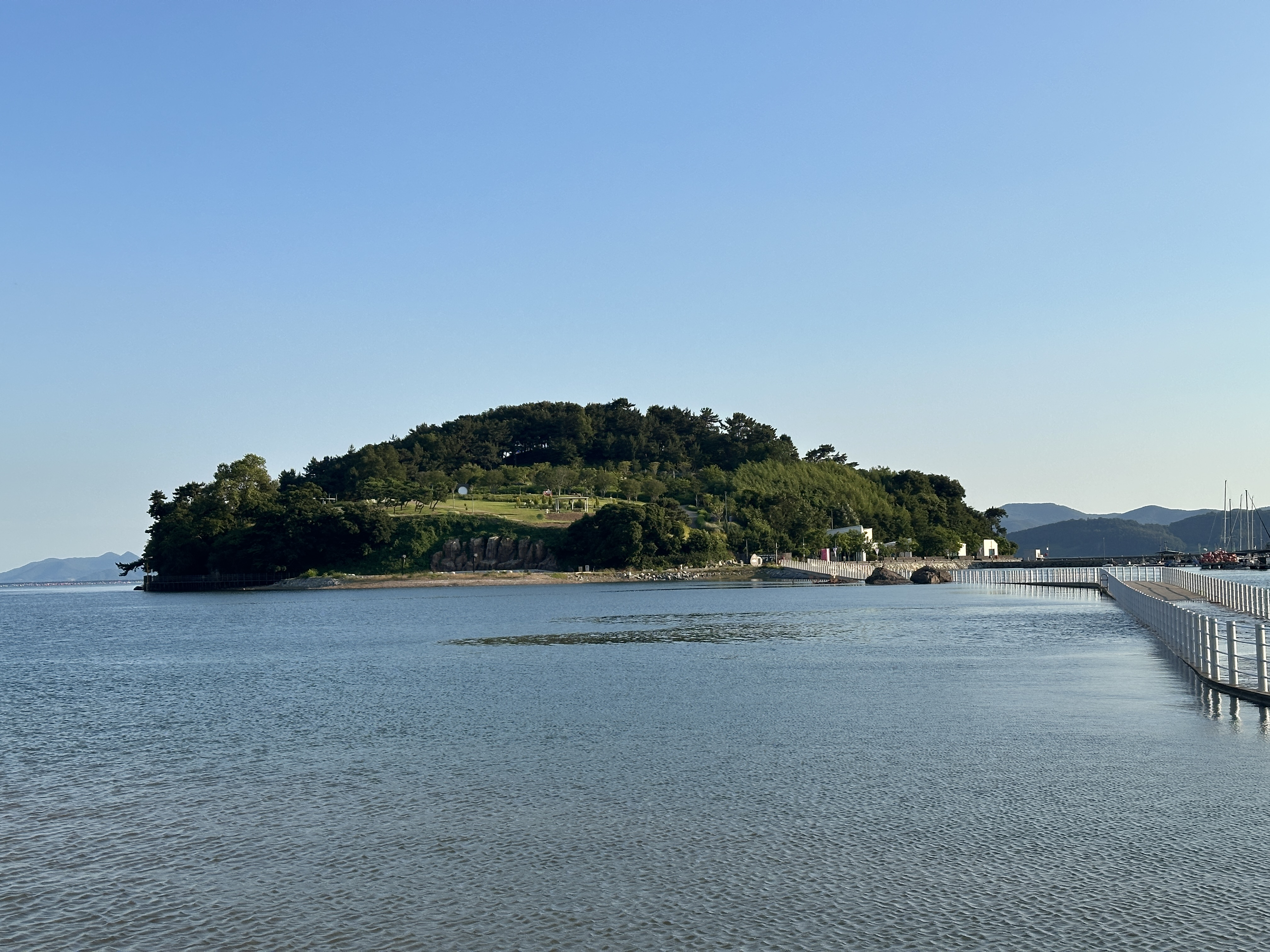
- The island, viewed from mainland (2026)
- Interactive map of Jangdo
- Location: Ungcheon-dong, Yeosu, Jeonnam-Gwangju, South Korea
- Coordinates: 34.74324°N 127.66419°E
- Area: 9.2865 hectares (22.947 acres)
- Opened: May 2019
- Facilities: Pedestrian bridge from mainland, cafés, art studios, and an exhibition hall

Jangdo (Korean: 장도; Hanja: 長島) is an island in Ungcheon-dong, Yeosu, Jeonnam-Gwangju, South Korea. The entirety of the island is a park, called Ungcheon Jangdo Park. The island has sometimes been called Jinseom (진섬). The area of the island is 92,865 square meters (999,590 ft^{2}) or 9.2865 ha (22.947 acres).

The park on the island was conceptualized around 2006, as a place for art and artists. Construction began in 2009. The park eventually opened in May 2019. The park has a number of facilities, including an exhibition hall, an art café, studios for resident artists, and walking paths.

The park is open between 6 am and 10 pm daily. Notably, there is a pedestrian bridge from the mainland to the island that is intentionally designed to be submerged with water twice per day, during high tide. This may sometimes limit when the park can be accessed.

== See also ==
- Ungcheon Beach Park – adjacent park on the mainland
- Odongdo – another island in Yeosu
- Janggundo – an uninhabited island in Yeosu
