= Yi Sun-sin Marina =

Marina in Yeosu, South Korea

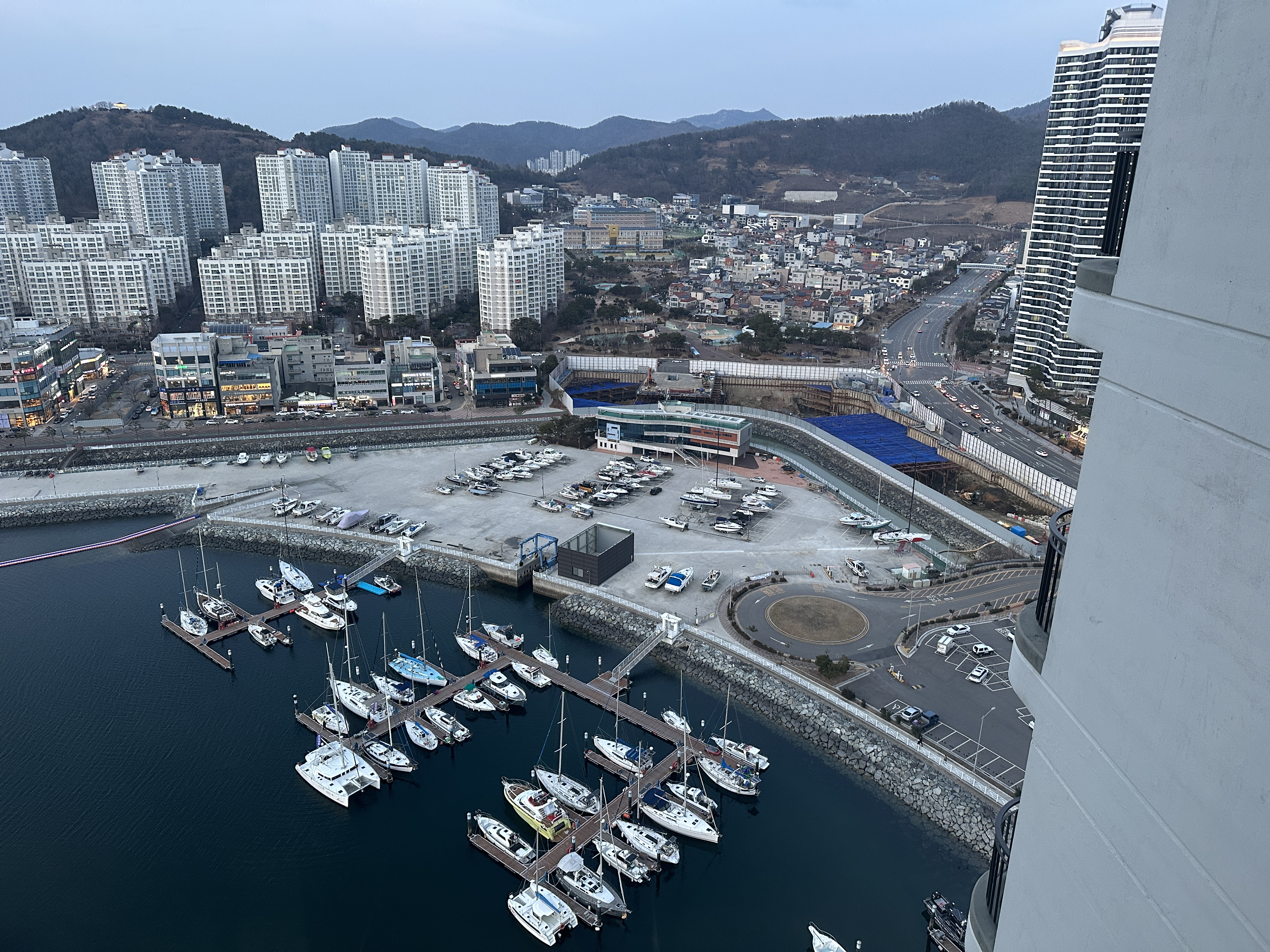
- The marina in 2023

Location
- Location: 12 Ungcheonnam 2-ro, Yeosu, South Jeolla Province, South Korea
- Coordinates: 34.74522°N 127.67275°E

Details
- Opened: March 21, 2016
- Type: Marina
- Area: 21,815 m^{2} (234,810 ft^{2})

Yi Sun-sin Marina (Korean: 이순신마리나) is a marina in Ungcheon-dong, Yeosu, South Jeolla Province, South Korea. It is named for the famed Korean admiral Yi Sun-sin.

The docks were primarily meant for leisure usage; for small boats and yachts. Construction began on the docks in June 2014, and they first began operating on March 21, 2016. The marina was initially named Ungcheon Yacht Marina (웅천요트마리나), but it was renamed to its current name by August of that year.

It has an onshore area of 21,815 m^{2} (234,810 ft^{2}), and water area of 36,606 m^{2} (394,020 ft^{2}). There are 102 onshore berths, 98 parking spaces, a crane, and a three-story building for members of the marina. The building hosts an auditorium, offices, and a clubhouse. There are 48 marine berths.

The marina has hosted several sporting events over its history. It hosted a triathlon in October 2023. It held its first annual Gamak Bay yacht competition on April 28, 2022.

== See also ==
- Yi Sun-sin Park (Yeosu) – nearby park also named for Yi
