= Yi Sun-sin Park (Yeosu) =

Park in Yeosu, South Korea

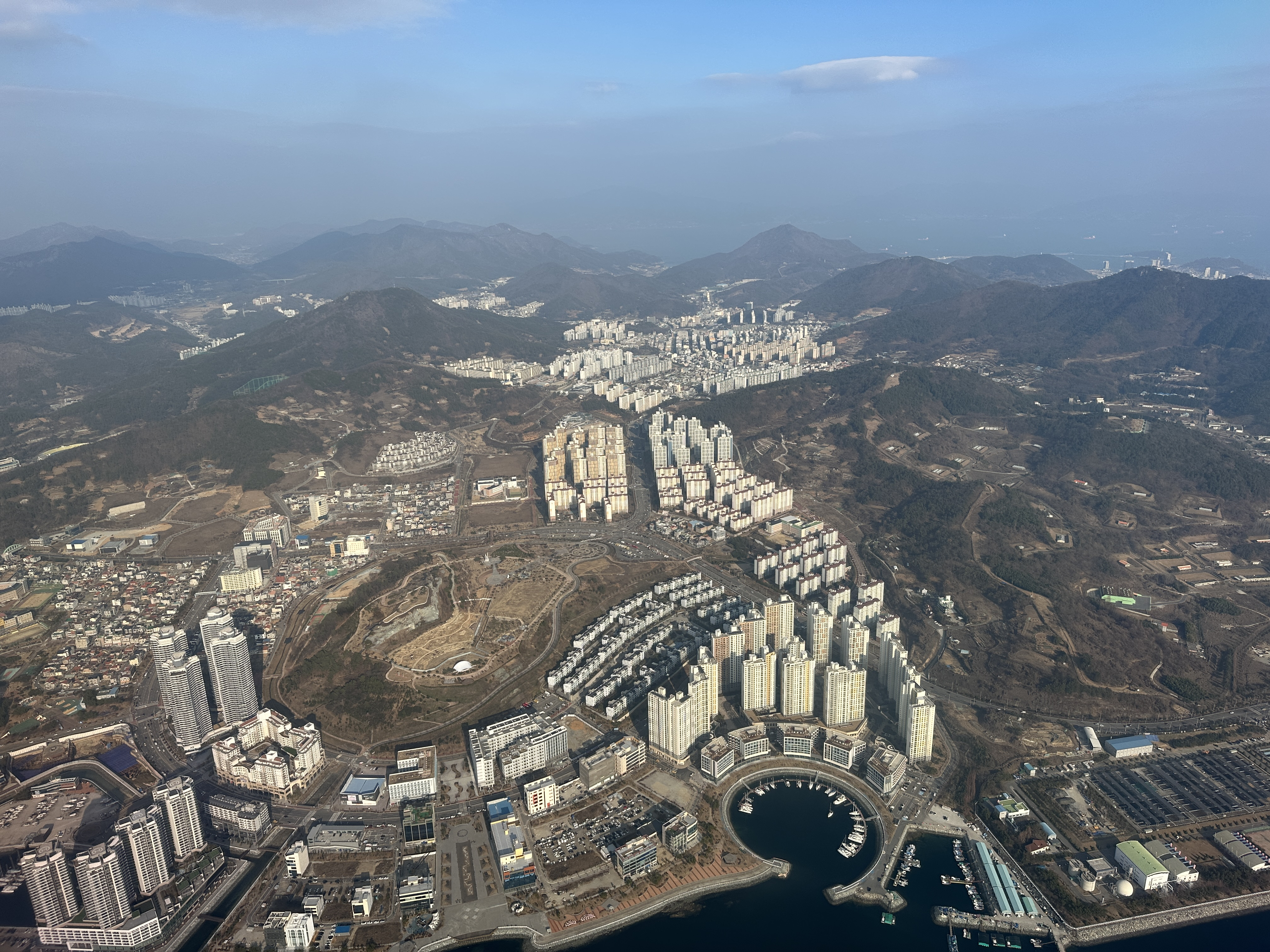
- An aerial view of Ungcheon-dong and the park (left) (2023)
- Type: Public park
- Location: Ungcheon-dong, Yeosu, South Jeolla Province, South Korea
- Coordinates: 34.744393°N 127.679829°E
- Area: 36.6093 hectares (90.464 acres)

Korean name
- Hangul: 이순신공원
- Hanja: 李舜臣公園
- RR: I Sunsin gongwon
- MR: I Sunsin kongwŏn

Yi Sun-sin Park (Korean: 이순신공원) is a public park in Ungcheon-dong, Yeosu, South Jeolla Province, South Korea. It is named for the famed Korean admiral Yi Sun-sin.

The area of the park is 366,093 square meters (3,940,590 sq ft). It has a number of facilities, including an outdoor stage, gardens, a maze, a children's play area, a fountain, a tennis court, a parking lot, and restrooms.

== Gallery ==
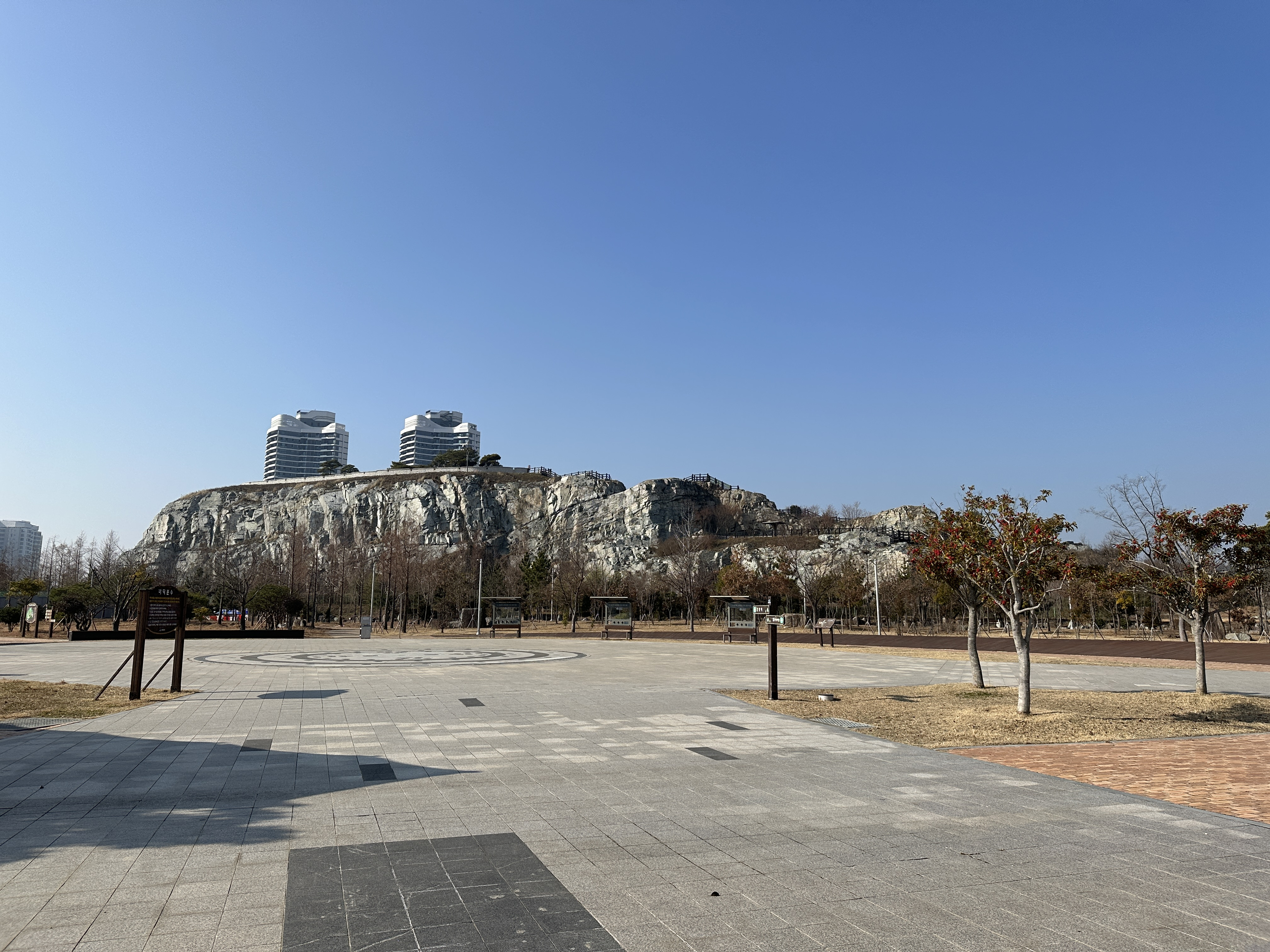
A fountain, and behind it a large rocky hill inside the park (2023)

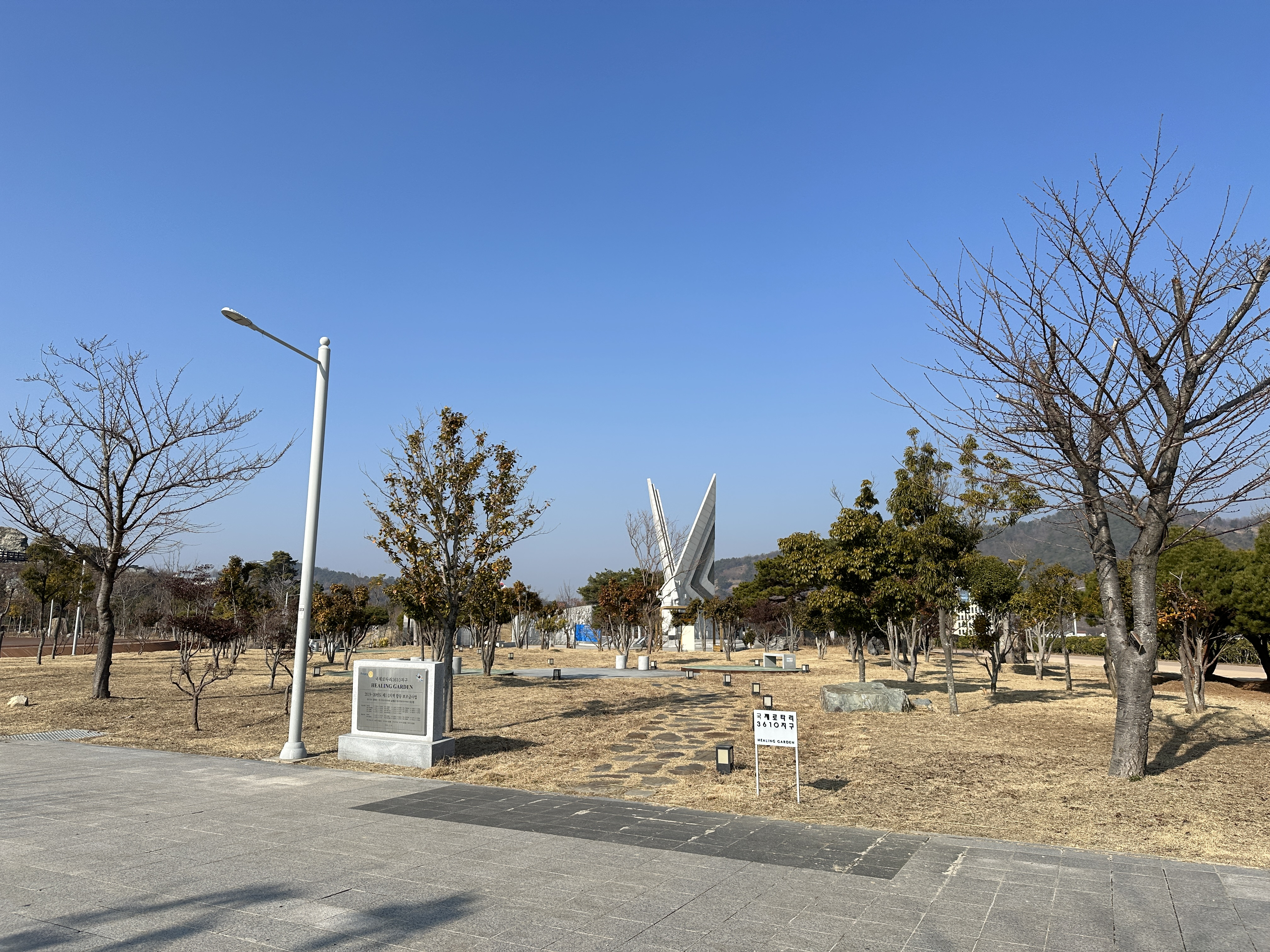
Trees, a statue, and footpaths in the park (2023)

== See also ==
- Yi Sun-sin Marina – a nearby marina also named for Yi
