= Ōei Invasion =

1419 Joseon invasion of Tsushima

- Part of Wars of the Muromachi period
Date	June 20, 1419 – July 3, 1419 (1 week and 6 days)
Location	Tsushima Island, Japan

Belligerents
Sō clan	Joseon dynasty

Commanders and leaders
Sō Sadamori	Yi Chongmu

Strength
600	17,285

Casualties and losses
Korean records: 129 ships 1,939 destroyed homes 114 dead (executed); 21 captured Japanese records: 123 dead	Korean records: Over a hundred 180 dead Japanese records: 2,500–3,700 dead

Korean campaign against Tsushima

Japanese name
- Kyūjitai: 應永の外寇
- Shinjitai: 応永の外寇
Transcriptions
- Revised Hepburn: Ōei no gaikō
- Kunrei-shiki: Ôei no gaikô

Korean name
- Hangul: 제삼차 대마도 정벌
- Hanja: 第三次對馬島征伐
Transcriptions
- Revised Romanization: Jesamcha Daemado jeongbeol
- McCune–Reischauer: Chesamch'a Taemado chŏngbŏl

Alternative Korean name
- Hangul: 기해동정
- Hanja: 己亥東征
Transcriptions
- Revised Romanization: Gihae dongjeong
- McCune–Reischauer: Kihae tongjŏng

The Ōei Invasion (応永の外寇, Ōei no gaikō), also known as the Kihae Expedition (Korean: 기해동정; Hanja: 己亥東征; MR: Kihae tongjŏng), was a 1419 Joseon invasion of Tsushima Island, which is located in the middle of the Tsushima Strait between the Korean Peninsula and Kyushu.

The third and largest suppression of Tsushima (對馬島 征伐) took place in 1419 (first year of the reign of Sejong), named after the zodiac of that year. It was preceded by the first suppression that took place in February 1389 and the second from December 1396. Both ended with the goal of eradicating pirate activity in the area. It is named after the hexagenerian zodiac of that year.

The Japanese identifying phrase derives from the Ōei era (1394–1428), which is the Japanese era name of the calendar system in use in Japan.

== Background ==
The immediate cause of the conquest was the incident on May 5, 1419, when 39 Japanese warships captured Cape Dodu (都豆音串) in Biin County (庇仁縣) on their way to Ming dynasty China. In this battle, the Joseon side lost 7 military ships and suffered heavy losses, including most of its crew.

In the 13th century, Wokou established themselves in the Tsushima Island area, conducting raids on the Korean mainland. The conflict between the court in Nara and Kyoto caused the central authority to be unable to limit pirate activity, while indirectly exacerbating it due to the accompanying political chaos. Tsushimas economy was heavily reliant on trade with Korea. It was used as a "frontier territory" and a diplomatic meeting place between Joseon and the Ashikaga/Tokugawa Shogunates.

The intensity of pirate activity was especially high from 1350 (reign of Chungjeong) In particular the reign of U (1374–1388) oversaw a total of 378 raids, an average of 27 times a year, threatening not only the coast of the South Sea but also the capital city of Gaegyeong and entering deep into the interior.

The first proposal to occupy Tsushima was made in 1387 by a military official called Jeongji (鄭地), but was not adopted.

The Goryeo military was busy with an expedition into the Liaodong in 1388, which caused the defenses in the south to be neglected and the Wokou to use this opportunity to raid the island of Yanggwang (楊廣道).

In response, the first suppression of Tsushima numbering around 100 ships was carried out led by the general Pak Wi (Korean: 박위; Hanja: 朴威), the provincial commander of Jeolla province Kim Jong-yeon (金宗衍), the provincial commander of Gyeonggi province Choe Chil-seok (崔七夕) and the local commander Park Ja-an (朴子安) and the Goryeo army cleared the island of Wokou, burned down 300 ships and rescued more than 100 Korean prisoners. There is no mention of any engagement with the Wokou.

Following the 1389 campaign, the Wokou momentum waned, but did not completely disappear after the transition from Goryeo to Joseon. From 1393 (Taejo 2) to 1397 (Taejo 6), a total of 53 incursions occurred. One event in particular, in August 1396 120 warships invaded Gyeongsang province and attacked Dongnae (東萊). Kim Sa-hyeong (김사형, 金士衡) Namjae (南在) and Yi Mu (李茂) were tasked with the suppression of Tsushima and Iki island and returned to Seoul in January 1397.

Following January 1398 Joha (朝賀) (On the occasion of the winter solstice where vassals and courtiers would pay their respects to the king) envoys from Tsushima came to Joseon court almost every year and would bring offerings and receive rice and beans in return. These envoys were sent by the Doju (島主, "island chief") Jeong Jeong-mu (宗貞茂, Sadashige Sō) and his sons, as well as by the aristocracy of the island. The concurring number of merchants visiting Korea increased rapidly, which led to various troubles. The Joseon government subsequently announced that traders are allowed entry to Busanpo (釜山浦) and Naeipo only on ships with a certificate of passage. Afterwards, there were many Wa (倭, ethnonym for Japanese) living in this area which according to the government officials caused unrest, while also attempting to sabotage the state authorities. In response in March 1418 Taejong he set up Japanese enclaves in Yeompo (鹽浦) and Gabae-ryang (加背梁) in Gyeongsang province.

Joseon subsequently asked the Ashikaga shogunate and its deputy in Kyūshū to suppress pirate activity, favoring legitimate traders. In exchange for certain privileges, it gave authority to Sō Sadashige, the de facto ruler of Tsushima Province, over ships sailing from Japan to Korea. When Sō Sadashige died in 1418, power was seized from Sadashige's infant son Sadamori (Tsutsukumaru) by Sōda Saemontarō, a powerful wokou leader. Suffering from famine, wokou on Tsushima invaded Ming China in 1419. On the way to China, they invaded Korea's Bi-in and Haeju counties after their demands for food were rejected.

After receiving reports of these incidents, the Korean court approved an expedition of Tsushima. King Taejong, who had abdicated his throne in 1418 but was still a military adviser of Sejong the Great, favored a more offensive approach. On June 9, 1419, Taejong declared a war against Tsushima, citing that it belonged to Joseon, and Yi Chongmu was chosen to conduct the expedition.

== Invasion ==
The Koreans waited until a large Japanese fleet had left the island for a raid. Yi Chongmu's fleet of 227 ships and 17,285 soldiers set off from Geoje Island toward Tsushima on June 19, 1419. The following day the fleet landed in Asō Bay (浅茅湾).

Yi Chongmu first sent captured Japanese pirates as emissaries to ask for surrender. When he received no reply, he sent out expeditionary forces, and the soldiers proceeded to raid the islanders and pirates and plunder pirate settlements. According to Veritable Records of the Joseon Dynasty, in the battle of June 20, the Korean army captured 129 wokou ships, burned 1,939 houses, killed 114 people, captured 21 people, and rescued 131 Chinese who were captured by the wokou. On June 29, the Joseon expeditionary forces "set fire to 68 houses belonging to the pirates, burned 15 vessels belonging to the pirates, beheaded 9 pirates, and obtained 15 Chinese men and women and 8 Joseon people who had been held in captivity. In the record of July 10, the number of soldiers killed by wokou was 180. On the other hand, according to Kanmon Nikki (看聞日記), a diary written by Prince Fushiminomiya Sadafusa (ja) on August 13, citing a report sent by Shoni Mitsusada (ja), the Tsushima side entered the battle with a cavalry force of about 700 cavalrymen and fought especially hard all day on June 26, killing over 3,700 Koreans by July 2. According to the Taishuu Chronenryaku, which was a Japanese source compiled later, the death toll of the Korean army was 2,500.

On July 3, the Korean army withdrew to Geoje Island, and according to the July 9 Veritable Records of the Joseon Dynasty, one of the high-ranking officials advised the king that it was not a good idea to sail out again because the soldiers' morale was already low, the ship's equipment was damaged, and the wind was getting stronger. According to the July 22 record, one of the high-ranking officials said that the Chinese had seen the defeat of the Korean army and could not let them return to China knowing the Korean's weakness. After that, the Korean army did not return to Tsushima.

== Aftermath ==
On July 17, the Joseon government sent a Segye (書契, official document used for diplomatic negotiations between Joseon and the Japanese Shogunate) to Tsushima demanding its surrender. After a while of negotiations on the terms of surrender and post-war settlement, the two sides finally agreed as follows in January 1420 under the conditions that Tsushima will be placed under the jurisdiction of Gyeongsang province that the envoy from Tsushima will bring the Lord of Tsushima to the Joseon court. This was supposed to serve as a formality in order to establish Tsushima as an official peaceful intermediary between the two countries.

In 1443, 24 years after the invasion, the Treaty of Gyehae was signed between Joseon and the daimyo (Japanese feudal lords), which stipulated that 50 Japanese trading ships could enter Joseon ports each year. As a result, wokou gradually declined. The treaty allowed the Sō clan to monopolize Japanese trade with Korea. In 1510, Japanese traders revolted against Joseon's stricter policies on Japanese traders from Tsushima and Iki coming to Busan, Ulsan and Jinhae to trade. The Sō clan supported the uprising, but it was eventually suppressed by local authorities. The uprising was later came to be known as the "Disturbance of the Three Ports".

A more restrictive treaty was re-imposed under the direction of King Jungjong in 1512, but this Treaty of Imsin was enacted only under strictly limited terms, and only 25 ships were allowed to visit Joseon annually until "Japanese riots in Saryangjin" (사량진왜변, 蛇梁鎭倭變) in 1544. Korean exports included rice, cotton, ginseng, and Sutra texts. In exchange, the Sō clan provided copper, tin, sulfur, medicinal herbs, and spices from both Tsushima island and Japan. The Sō clan became a trading hub between Korea and Japan and benefited greatly from it. The relationship between Korea and residents of Tsushima Island greatly improved thereafter; there were numerous records of hospitality towards shipwrecked Korean sailors who ended up on the island, and merchants from Tsushima Island enjoyed special privileges in Korean ports.

=== According to Japanese sources ===
In Kyoto, rumors of the invasion spread around the end of the June 1419. The raid was associated with the Mongol invasions of Japan. By August, Shōni Mitsusada, the overlord of the Sō clan, reported to the Ashikaga shogunate that the Shōni's deputy Sō Uemon had defeated Korean invaders. However, Korean captives were reported to have stated that forces from Ming China were planning to invade Japan. Since shōgun Ashikaga Yoshimochi took a harder stance toward the Ming than his father Yoshimitsu, the threat was taken seriously by the shogunate. Later, the shōgun received a report from the Kyūshū Deputy. Since it was considerably different from the Shōni's version, the shōgun felt the necessity of examining Korea's real intentions.

In a letter to Sō Sadamori issued on 15 July, the Joseon claimed that Tsushima belonged to Gyeongsang Province and asked him to leave the island, either by coming to the Korean mainland and submitting himself or by retreating to Japan. In August, a man who claimed to be an envoy of Sō Sadamori arrived in Korea. The conditions he presented seemed unsatisfactory to the Joseon. Taejong made similar demands of the envoy in September. Sejong Sillok, the same self-claimed envoy, agreed to Korea's proposal to put Tsushima under the rule of Gyeongsang Province. The Korean court approved of this agreement. However, in later negotiations it was revealed that the envoy was not actually a representative of Sō Sadamori.

In November 1419, envoys of Ashikaga Yoshimochi visited Korea. In return, King Sejong sent Song Hŭigyŏng to Japan. The diplomatic mission left the Joseon capital in early 1420 and met with Soda Saemontaro on Tsushima as Sō Sadamori stayed with the Shōni clan in Hizen Province. Sō Sadamori arrived in Kyoto in April. Having accomplished his mission, he left Kyoto in June, returning to Korea after completing negotiations with the Shōni and Sō clans in Kyūshū. This trip corrected mutual misunderstandings between Japan and Korea. In Tsushima, Song received a protest from Soda Saemontaro over a Korean document that stated Tsushima's dependence on Korea. He warned of the Shōni clan's possible military action. Song realized that Sō Sadamori had not been involved in the previous negotiations, and also learned of the Sō clan's vassalage to the Shōni clan. These realizations overturned Korea's plans towards Tsushima. In Kyoto, Song clarified that the Joseon had no intention of invading Japan. On their way back, Korean envoys faced the Sō and Shōni's hard-line attitude toward the Joseon.

In April 1421, a letter from Sō Sadamori demanded the return of Japanese captives and pointed out Korea's claim over Tsushima. It is noted that the Japanese envoy took advantage of the shogunate's authority, which can frequently be found in the Sō clan's later diplomatic talks with Korea. By the order of Taejong, Korea took a tough stance against the Sō clan. Although Soda's messengers visited Korea several times, they did not reach a settlement until 1423. The death of the hard-line Taejong in May 1422 softened Korea's policy toward Japan. Under Sejong, Joseon relinquished its claims to Tsushima and decided to grant trade privileges to the Sō clan in exchange for its duty to maintain trade order.

=== According to Korean sources ===
In 1419, King Sejong, under the advice of his father and former king Taejong, decided to attack the wokou at Tsushima while the pirates were engaged in raids against China. In May 1419 notice of this plan was sent as an ultimatum to the Tsushima province authorities. In the war declaration against Tsushima government, the king claimed Tsushima, known as Daemado in Korean, had degraded because of the lack of interference on pirate activities by the local authority. Korea repeated necessary involvement in the island's operations, by aiding in the recent famine and general trade route policing led the ruler to declare the land would be reclaimed by force in order to protect the integrity of the region.

During the conflicts, 180 Korean soldiers were killed. In the July 1419, Taejong sent a letter to Tsushima's Sō Sadamori laying claim to the historical repossession of Tsushima with the Korean victory in war. Once again the land was Korean territory as it had been under the Kingdom of Silla. An arrangement was proposed for Tsushima to enter into a tributary relationship. In the September 1419 Sadamori sent an emissary to surrender the territory and to present a variety of tribute to the Korean court. In January 1420, a Japanese envoy visiting Seoul requested to have a copy of Tripitaka Koreana, a comprehensive Buddhist script held in great regard as a Korean national treasure. Sejong granted the request as sign of friendship between two countries. Sadamori requested that the island officially become a state of Korea under the name of Daemado, also promising to personally become a subject and to manage the wokou situation as an independent act of the state. Sejong granted this request as well as allowing Sadamori to report to Gyeongsang Province rather than Seoul.

== See also ==
- History of Japan
- Naval history of Japan
- History of Korea
- Naval history of Korea
- Treaty of Gyehae
- Japanese riots in Southeast Korea (1510)
