= Ungcheon-dong, Yeosu =

Ungcheon-dong
- Dong (Neighborhood)
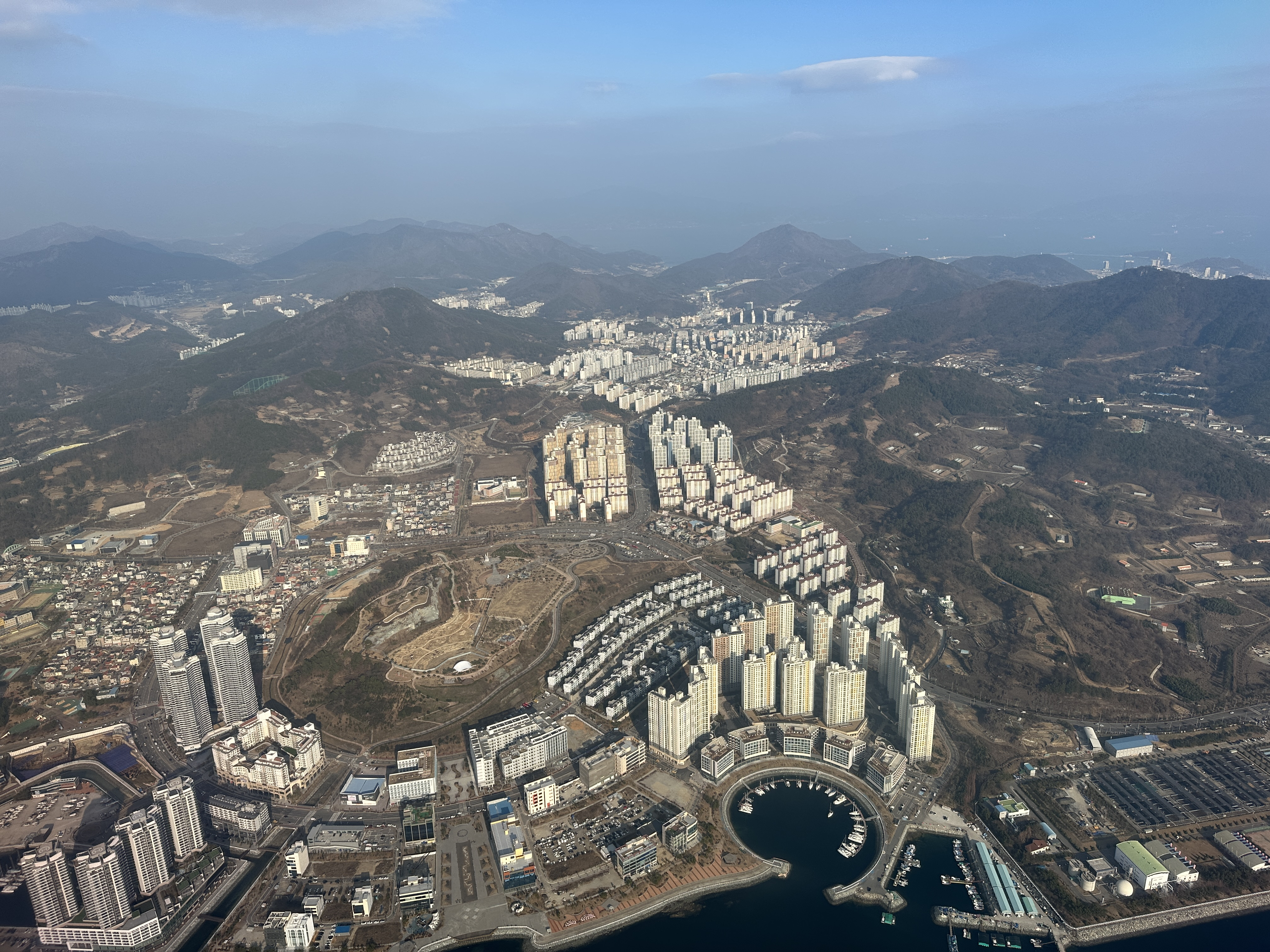
- Viewed from the sky, during the winter (2023)
- Interactive map of Ungcheon-dong
- Coordinates: 34.74683°N 127.68075°E
- Country: South Korea
- Province: South Jeolla Province
- City: Yeosu

Population (2022)
  - Total: 28,658

Ungcheon-dong (Korean: 웅천동; Hanja: 熊川洞) is a dong (neighborhood) of Yeosu, South Jeolla Province, South Korea.

As of September 2022, the population in the area is 28,658 (14,352 male, 14,306 female), living in 10,166 households.

The area is where the mother of the famed Korean admiral Yi Sun-sin is from. The area is host to Yi Sun-sin Park, the park island Jangdo, and Ungcheon Beach Park. It also contains Yi Sun-sin Marina.
