= Ungcheon Beach Park =

Beach and park in Yeosu, South Korea

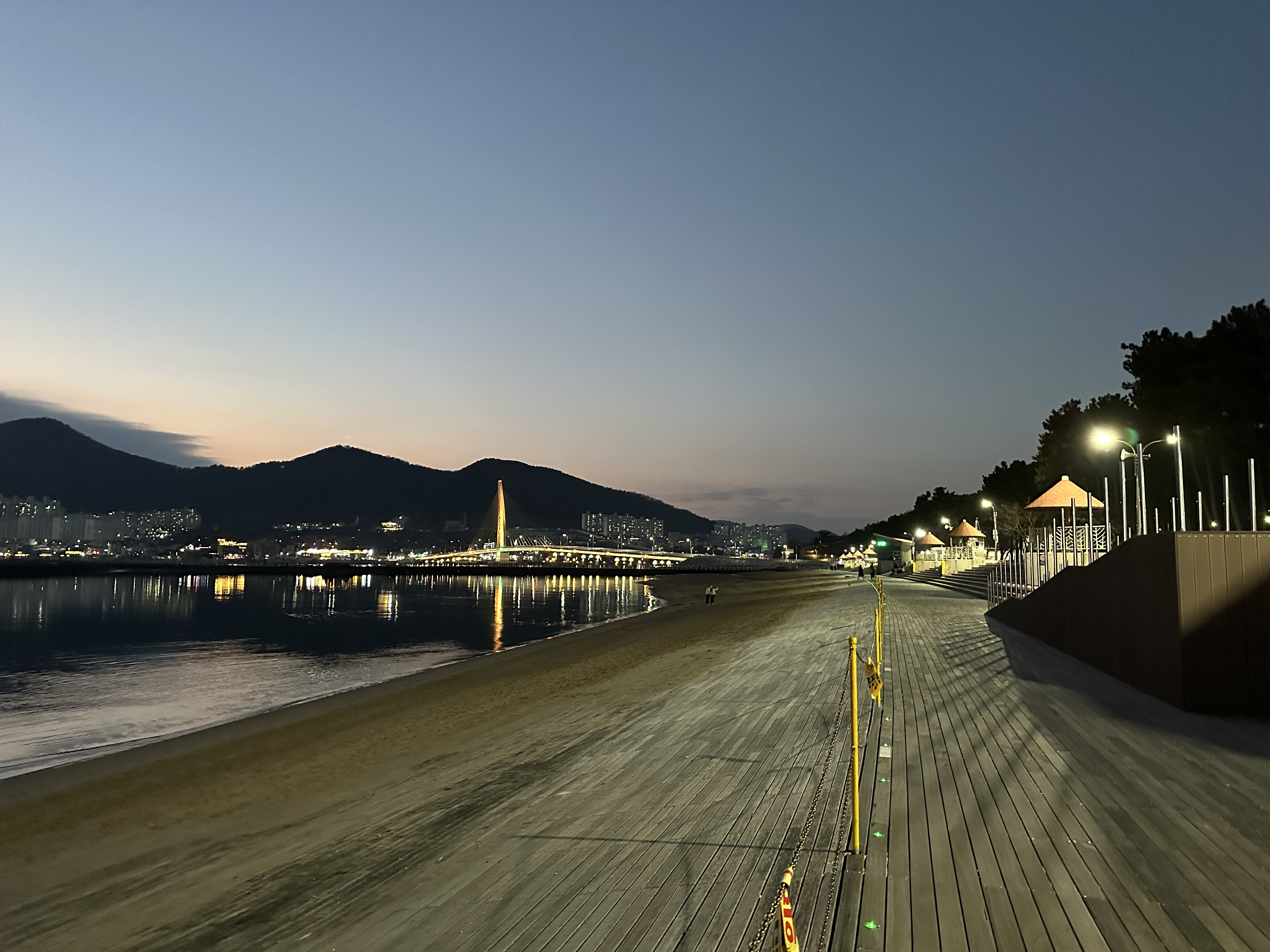
- The park at dusk (2023)
- Interactive map of Ungcheon Beach Park
- Type: Public beach
- Location: Ungcheon-dong, Yeosu, South Jeolla Province, South Korea
- Coordinates: 34.74721°N 127.66777°E
- Area: 2.3534 hectares (5.815 acres)
- Established: March 2010
- Parking: Onsite, free, 380 spaces

Ungcheon Beach Park (Korean: 웅천친수공원; Hanja: 熊川親水公園) is a beach and park in Ungcheon-dong, Yeosu, South Jeolla Province, South Korea. It is a beach next to Gamak Bay. The beach was first opened in March 2010, and has an area of 23,534 square meters (253,320 ft^{2}). The beach is 360 m (1,180 ft). Entrance to the park and use of the parking lot is free.

Efforts to create the park first began in October 2006. In March 2007, the design of the park was completed. Construction began in November 2007. The sand of the beach was finished being laid by December 2009. Extra facilities, such as a pine forest, walking trail, campsite, restrooms, showers, drinking fountains, an outdoor stage, and a 380-space parking lot were installed. It finished by March 2010. The park was renovated in 2018.

The campsite has space for 70 tents. There is also a grassy lawn of 5,400 m^{2} (58,000 ft^{2}).
