= Wokou =

13th–17th century pirates in East Asia

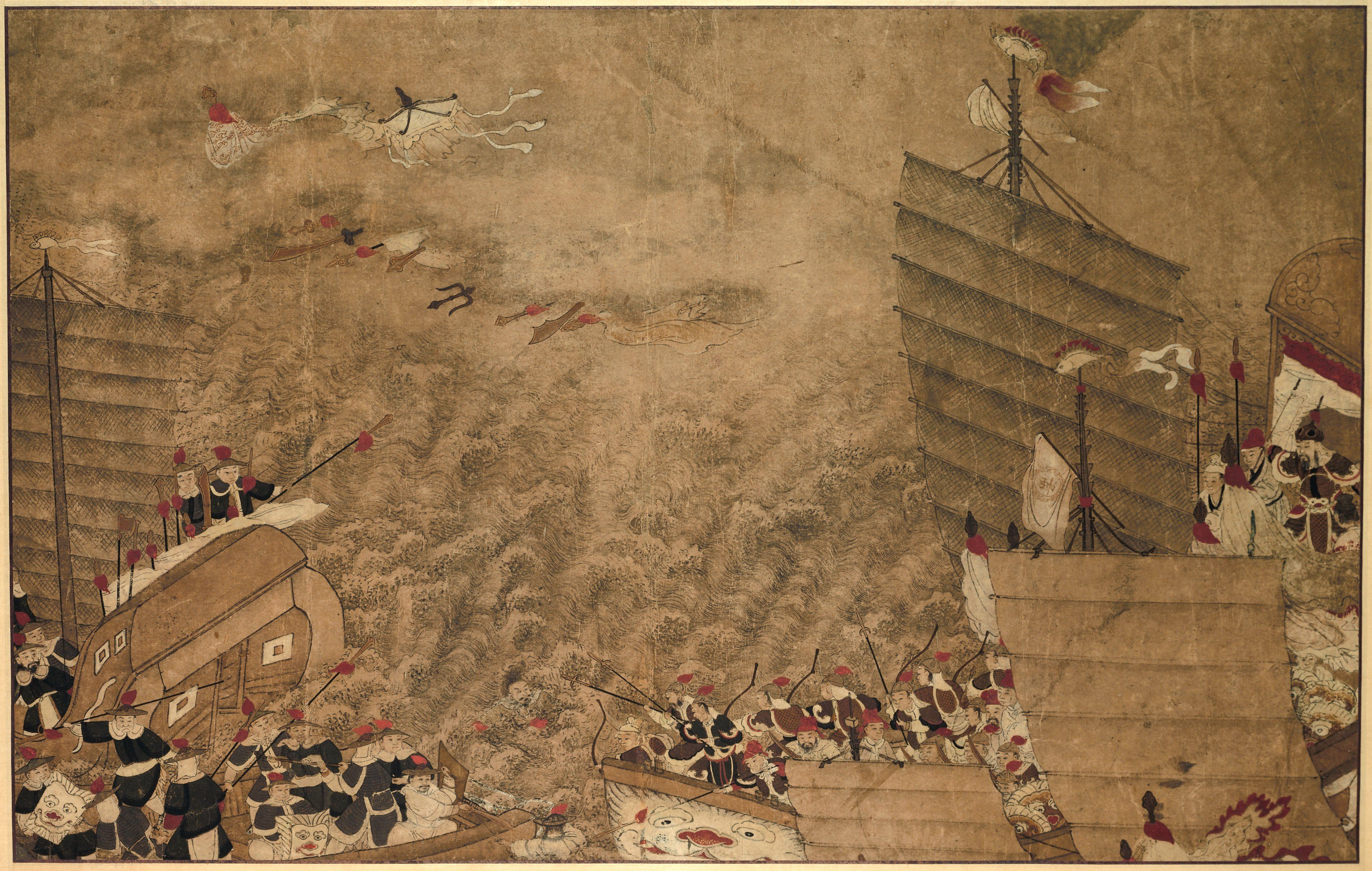
- 18th-century Chinese painting depicting a naval battle between wokou pirates and the Ming navy

Chinese name
- Chinese: 倭寇
Transcriptions
Standard Mandarin
- Hanyu Pinyin: wōkòu
- Bopomofo: ㄨㄛ ㄎㄡˋ
- Wade–Giles: wo^{1}-k'ou^{4}
- IPA: [wókʰôʊ]
Wu
- Romanization: u kheu
Hakka
- Romanization: vo24 kieu55
Yue: Cantonese
- Yale Romanization: wōkau
- Jyutping: wo1 kau3
- IPA: [wɔ˥kʰɐw˧]
Southern Min
- Hokkien POJ: E-khò͘
- Tâi-lô: E-khòo

Korean name
- Hangul: 왜구
- Hanja: 倭寇
Transcriptions
- Revised Romanization: waegu
- McCune–Reischauer: waegu

Japanese name
- Kanji: 倭寇
- Hiragana: わこう
Transcriptions
- Revised Hepburn: wakō
- Kunrei-shiki: wakô

Wokou, meaning "Japanese pirates" (or "dwarf pirates"), were pirates who raided the coastlines of China and Korea from the 13th century to the 17th century. The wokou were made of various ethnicities of East Asian ancestry, which varied over time and raided the mainland from islands in the Sea of Japan and East China Sea.

Wokou activity in Korea declined after the Treaty of Gyehae in 1443 but continued in Ming China and peaked during the Jiajing wokou raids in the mid-16th century. Chinese reprisals and strong clamp-downs on pirates by Japanese authorities saw the wokou disappear by the 17th century.

== History ==
There are two distinct eras of wokou piracy. The early wokou mostly set up camp on the outlying islands of the Japanese archipelago in the Sea of Japan, as opposed to the 16th-century wokou who were mostly non-Japanese. The early wokou raided the Japanese as well as the Chinese and Koreans.

The first recorded use of the term wokou (倭寇) is on the Gwanggaeto Stele, erected in modern Ji'an, Jilin, China to celebrate the exploits of Gwanggaeto the Great of Goguryeo (r. 391–413). The stele states that "wokou" ("Japanese robbers") crossed the sea and were defeated by him in 404. The term wokou is a combination of the Chinese terms Wō (倭), referring to either dwarfs or pejoratively to the Japanese, and kòu (寇) means "bandit", "robber", or "plunderer".

=== Early wokou ===
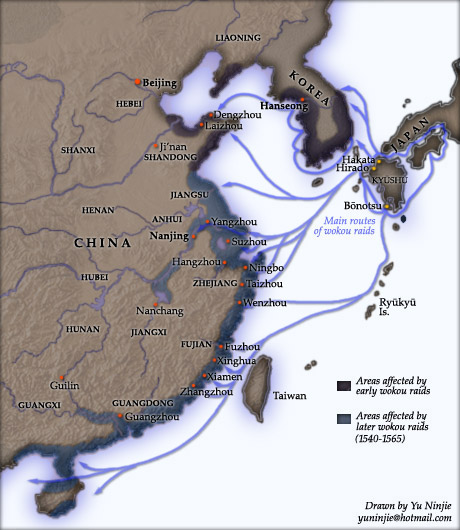
A map of 14th and 16th-century wokou pirate raids

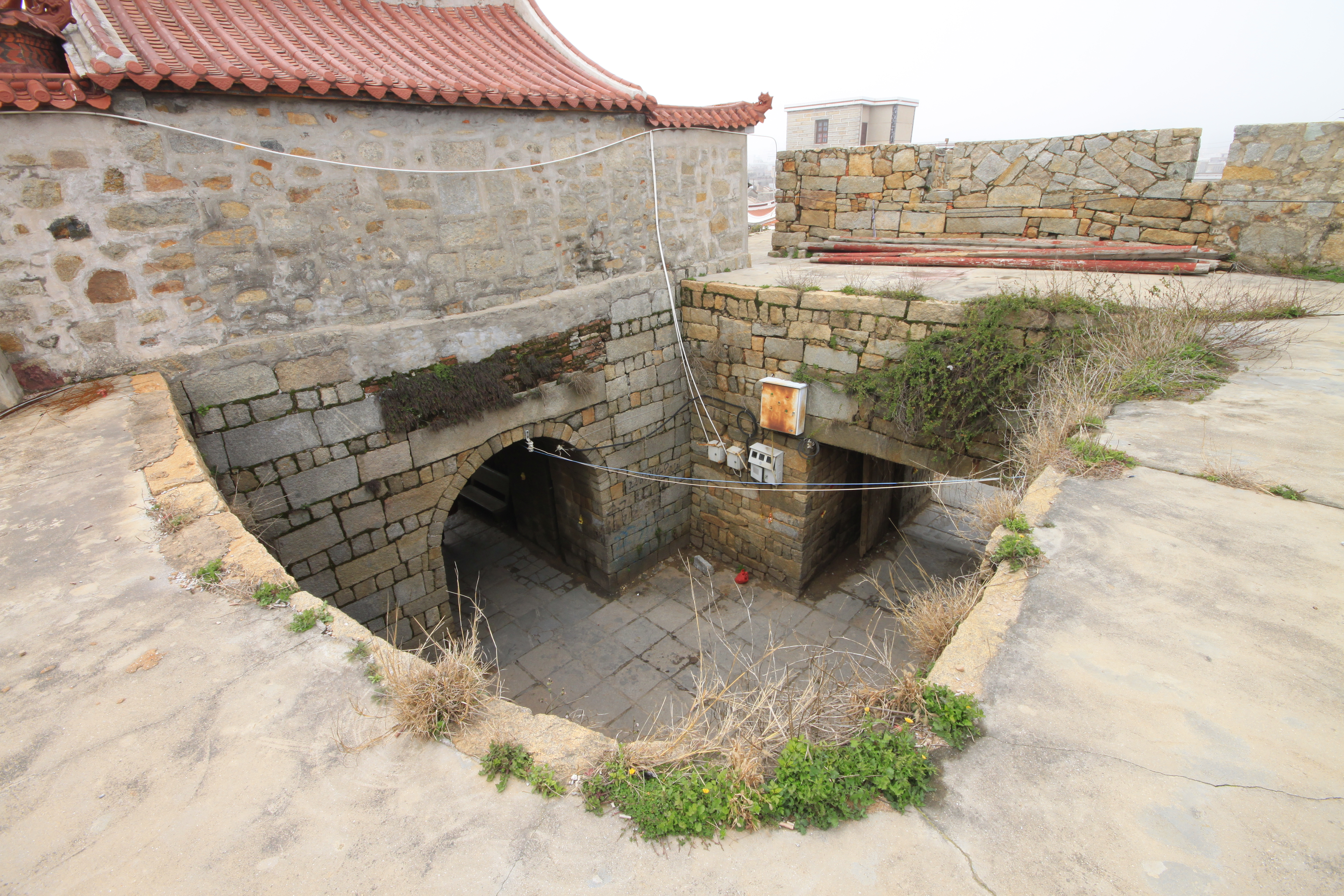
One of the gates of the Chongwu Fortress on the Fujian coast, originally built c. 1384

The origin of the term wokou dates back to the 4th century, but among wokou's activities, which are divided into two academic periods, the pirates called "early wokou" were borne from the Mongol invasions of Japan. As a result of the war, the coastal defense capabilities of China and Korea were significantly reduced, and the people living in Tsushima, Iki, and Gotō Islands in Kyushu suffered extreme poverty. For these reasons, wokou gradually intensified their looting on the coasts of China and Korea. Chŏng Mong-ju was dispatched to Japan to deal with the problem. During his visit, Kyushu governor Imagawa Sadayo suppressed the wokou, returning their captured property and people to Korea. In 1405, Ashikaga Yoshimitsu sent 20 captured pirates to China, where they were boiled in a cauldron in Ningbo.

According to Korean records, wokou were particularly rampant roughly from 1350. After almost annual invasions of the southern provinces of Jeolla and Gyeongsang, they migrated northwards to the Chungcheong and Gyeonggi areas. The History of Goryeo has a record of sea battles in 1380 whereby one hundred warships were sent to Jinpo to rout Japanese pirates there, releasing 334 captives. Wokou sorties decreased thereafter. The wokou were effectively expelled through the use of gunpowder technology, which the wokou lacked, after Goryeo founded the Office of Gunpowder Weapons in 1377 (which was abolished twelve years later).

In 1419, the Korean army landed in Tsushima and started the Ōei Invasion, the largest operation against the wokou. General Yi Chongmu's fleet of 227 ships and 17,285 soldiers set off from Geoje Island toward Tsushima on 19 June 1419. According to "Veritable Records of the Joseon Dynasty" a Korean history book, on 20 June the Korean army captured 129 wokou ships, burned 1,939 houses, killed 114 people, captured 21 people, and rescued 131 Chinese whom the wokou had captured.

On 29 June, they burned 15 wokou ships and 68 houses, killed 9 people, and rescued 15 people, including Chinese and Koreans, who had been held captive, but more than 100 soldiers were killed by wokou. On 3 July, the Korean army withdrew to Geoje Island and withdrew completely after giving up the re-landing and occupation of Tsushima because of the loss of Korean army and worsening weather. In the record of 10 July, the number of soldiers killed by wokou was rectified to 180. On the other hand, according to historical documents recorded by the Sō clan, the death toll of the Korean army was 2,500.

When the Treaty of Gyehae was concluded between the Joseon and Sō Sadamori of Tsushima in 1443 and the Sō clan was given trade privileges, wokou's activities along the Korean Peninsula calmed down. Some of the coastal forts built for defense against wokou can still be found in Zhejiang and Fujian. Among them are the well-restored Pucheng Fortress (in Cangnan County, Zhejiang) and Chongwu Fortress (in Chongwu, Huai'an County, Fujian), as well as the ruins of the Liu'ao Fortress in Liu'ao, Fujian.

=== Later wokou ===
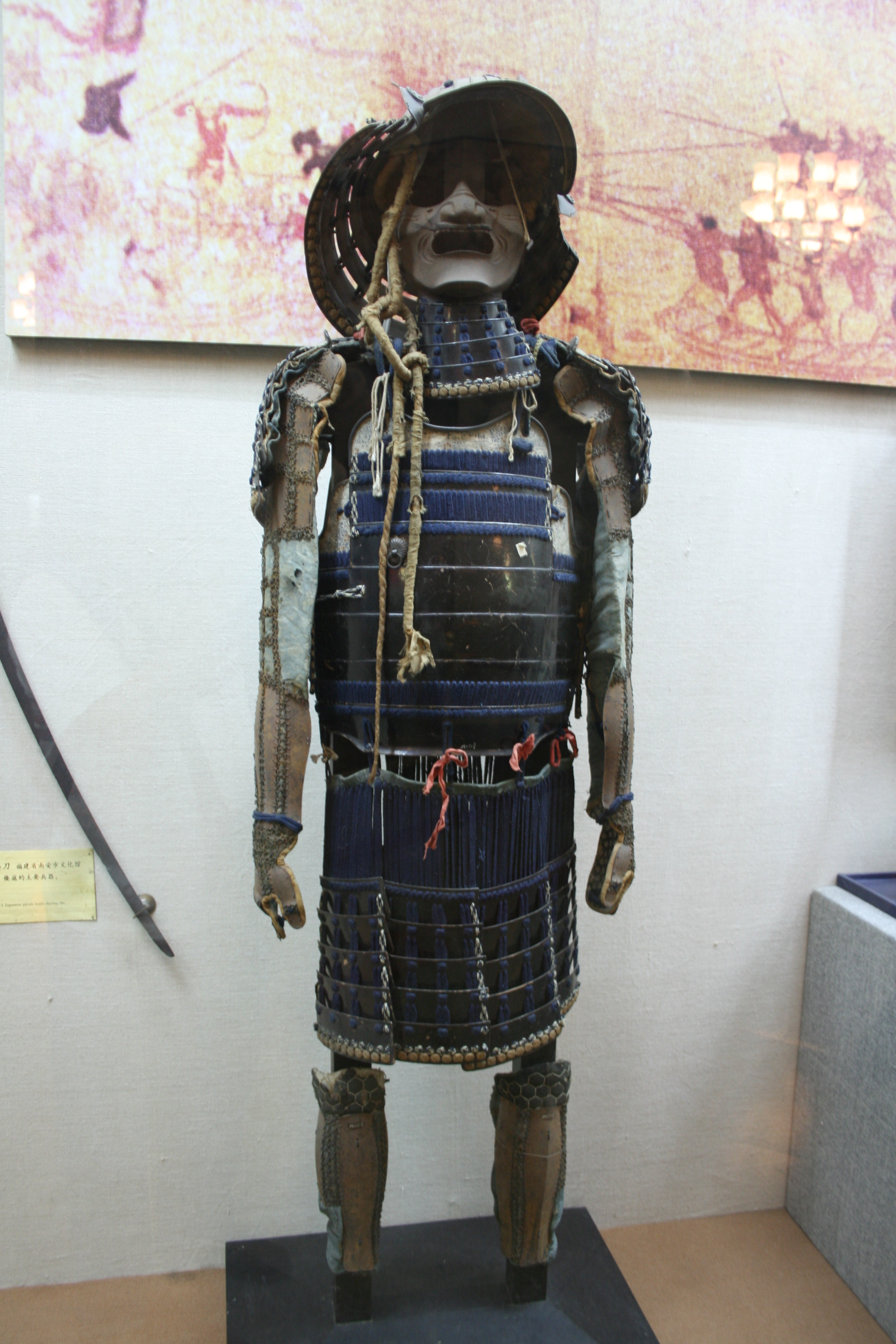
A suit of wokou armour on display at the Military Museum of the Chinese People's Revolution

After the 1523 Ningbo incident, when order in offshore islands of Zhejiang and Fujian provinces like Shuangyu collapsed, the Jiajing wokou raids that terrorized the coast of China in the 1550s emerged.

In attempts to centralize political control, the Ming dynasty enacted trade bans with the consensus being that "unrestricted trade would lead to chaos". With maritime trade outlawed, China's navy was reduced, and as a result, they could not combat increased smuggling, which led to wokou control over the southeastern coast. Although wokou means "Japanese pirates", major wokou groups in the 16th century were led by Chinese traders whose livelihoods were halted by the Ming trade bans. Because of the extent of corruption in the Ming court, many Chinese officials had relations with the pirates and benefited from the piracy, making it difficult for central authorities to control.

According to historian Sanjay Subrahmanyam, the existence of the wokou pirates stimulated clandestine private trade along the Fujian and Zhejiang coasts between local traders and the Portuguese. This allowed some travellers and Jesuits missionaries such as Francis Xavier who recorded much information about China in 1540s and early 1550s. Example of such networks include the Portuguese who found their way to Japan in 1543, aided by a wokou merchant-mediator named Wang Zhi (d. 1559) who helped the Portuguese communicate with the local lord after landing at Tanegashima in the south of Japan.

Two well-known Chinese military figures involved in combating the wokou were Qi Jiguang and Yu Dayou. Yu Dayou was a Ming dynasty general assigned to defend the coast against the wokou. In 1553, a young man named Qi Jiguang became the Assistant Regional Military Commissioner of the Ming dynasty. He was assigned to "punish the bandits and guard the people", which meant taking on the wokou attacking the Ming east coast. At that time, he was 26 years old. On the eve of the following year, he was promoted to the full commissioner in Zhejiang because of his successes.

The Wokou pirates were recorded as having been involved in human trafficking and slavery in Japan around the 1550s. Zheng Shungong’s 1556 report noted 200–300 Chinese slaves in Satsuma treated "like cattle" for labor, a fate shared by many Japanese.

The wokou even entered the Philippines before their extermination in the 17th century. Aparri in northern Luzon was established as a pirate city-state under the patronage of the wokou. The area around Aparri was the site of the 1582 Cagayan battles between wokou and Spanish soldiers. The wokou were not limited to Aparri. The pirate-warlord Limahong attempted and failed to invade Manila and afterwards set up a temporary pirate state in Caboloan (Pangasinan) before the Spanish expelled him.

Approximate number of pirate raids on Ming China by reign period and by region
Reign period	Region						Total
Reign period	Liaodong	Shandong	Jiangnan	Zhejiang	Fujian	Guangdong	Total
Hongwu (1358–1398)	1	7	5	21	3	9	46
Jianwen (1399–1402)				2			2
Yongle (1403–1424)	2	8	4	25	1	3	43
Hongxi (1425)							0
Xuande (1426–1435)				1	1	1	3
Zhengtong (1436–1449)	1			10			11
Jingtai (1450–1456)				1			1
Tianshun (1457–1464)							0
Chenghua (1465–1487)				1		1	2
Hongzhi (1488–1505)						1	1
Zhengde (1506–1521)		1				1	2
Jiajing (1522–1566)		5	207	192	158	39	601
Longqing (1567–1572)						19	19
Wanli (1573–1619)		1		5		9	15
Total							746

== Ethnicity controversy ==
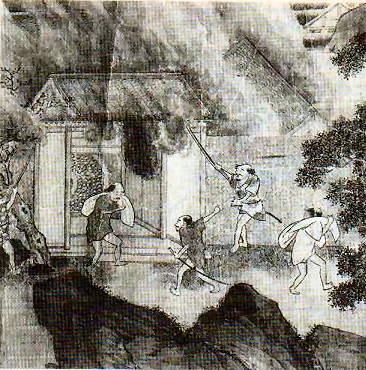
Attacks by the wokou. Excerpt of the Wokou Tujuan, a 17th-century scroll

The identity of the wokou remains a subject of debate, with various theories regarding their ethnic composition and national origins.

According to the History of Ming, in a 1555 wokou raiding party, 30% of the wokou were ethnic Japanese, and 70% were others. According to Censor Du Zhonglu, in a memorial dated 1553, the pirates were 10% barbarian people, 20% Ryukyuans, and the rest from Fujian and Ningbo areas of China. According to Ray Huang, a Chinese-American historian, the Japanese pirates frequently collaborated with Chinese groups. Japan served as a base for the pirates, and the Japanese provided much of the military expertise and equipment.

Professor Takeo Tanaka of University of Tokyo proposed in 1966 that the early wokou were Koreans living on these outlying islands. In the Veritable Records of the Joseon Dynasty, the compiled section for King Sejong the Great relates that a vassal named Yi Sun-mong (Korean: 이순몽; Hanja: 李順蒙, 1386–1449) told his monarch "I hear that in the late Goryeo kingdom period, wokou roaming (our country) and the peasants could not withstand them. However, only 1 or 2 (out of 10) were caused by (real) Japanese. Some of our peasants imitatively wore Japanese clothing, formed a group and caused trouble... in order to stop all evils, there is nothing more urgent than the Hopae (personal identification system)".

However, Yi did not live in Goryeo times and was likely recounting rumour or legend rather than solid, documented evidence. Moreover, the thrust of Yi's speech centers on the deterioration of national security and its need for special attention; it is possible that he relied on unreliable information to support his point. Yi's assertion is therefore not highly valued as a source for wokou by other researchers. The Goryeosa records 529 wokou raids during the 1223–1392 period but mentions the "fake Japanese" only three times.

The current prevailing theory is that of Shōsuke Murai, who demonstrated in 1988 that the early wokou came from multiple ethnic groups rather than one singular nation. Murai writes that the wokou were "marginal men" living in politically unstable areas without national allegiances, akin to the Zomia thesis. Supporters of this theory point out that one of the early wokou leaders, Ajibaldo, was variously claimed by period sources to be Mongolian, Japanese, Korean, and an "islander"; his name is apparently Korean and Mongolian in origin.

== See also ==
- Piracy in the Strait of Malacca
- God of War (film)
- Limahong
- Lin Daoqian
