= Yi Chongmu =

Korean general (1360–1425)

- Hangul: 이종무
- Hanja: 李從茂
- RR: I Jongmu
- MR: I Chongmu

Yi Chongmu (1360–1425) was a Korean general who led the Ōei Invasion of Tsushima Island in 1419.

He was noted for leading a fleet of 227 ships and 17,285 soldiers which landed at the Tsushima Island in Aso Bay on June 19, 1419, which was met with little resistance. General Sō Sadamori, the Daimyo of Tsushima, proposed a treaty to the Joseon court in September 1419.

His conquest not only rescued victims taken by Japanese pirates including 146 Chinese and 8 Koreans, but also put an end to Japanese pirate raids in Korea and China, as well as paving the way for special trade relationships in between Joseon Korea and the Sō clan of Tsushima Island.

== See also ==
- History of Korea
- Military history of Korea
- Military history of Japan
- Joseon dynasty

== References and external links ==
- (in Korean) General Yi's biography

Specific
