= Angolmois: Record of Mongol Invasion =

Japanese manga series

- The cover of the first volume featuring Kuchii.

アンゴルモア 元寇合戦記 (Angorumoa: Genkō Kassen-ki)
- Genre: Historical
- Manga
- Written by: Nanahiko Takagi
- Published by: Kadokawa Shoten
- Imprint: Kadokawa Comics Ace
- Magazine: Samurai Ace (2013); ComicWalker (2014-2018)
- Original run: February 26, 2013 – August 22, 2018
- Volumes: 10
- Novel series

Angolmois: Ihon Genkō Gassen-ki
- Written by: Akaganedai
- Illustrated by: Nanahiko Takagi
- Published by: Kadokawa Shoten
- Imprint: Novel 0
- Original run: June 15, 2018 – October 15, 2018
- Volumes: 2
- Anime television series
- Directed by: Takayuki Kuriyama
- Produced by: Junichirō Tamura
- Written by: Shōgo Yasukawa
- Music by: Shūji Katayama (Team-MAX)
- Studio: Naz (Note: Animation production assistance (アニメーション制作協力) for all episodes provided by Jumondou.)
- Licensed by: Crunchyroll: SEA: Medialink
- Original network: SUN, Tokyo MX, KBS, TVA, TVQ, BS11
- Original run: July 11, 2018 – September 26, 2018
- Episodes: 12
- Manga

Angolmois: Genkō Kassen-ki Hakata-hen
- Written by: Nanahiko Takagi
- Published by: Kadokawa Shoten
- Imprint: Kadokawa Comics Ace
- Magazine: ComicWalker
- Original run: January 2, 2019 – present
- Volumes: 12

Angolmois: Record of Mongol Invasion (Japanese: アンゴルモア 元寇合戦記, Hepburn: Angorumoa: Genkō Kassen-ki) is a Japanese historical manga series written and illustrated by Nanahiko Takagi. An anime television series adaptation by Naz aired from July 11 to September 26, 2018.

The term Angolmois comes from the prophecies of Nostradamus about the reign of the great king of Angolmois, which is interpreted as being an anagram of the Old French word Mongolais 'Mongolians' and thus referring to Genghis Khan.

== Plot ==
The story follows a group of prisoners who are exiled to Tsushima Island to help form a first line of defense against the first Mongol invasion of Japan in 1274. They first join the Sō clan who then join with the Toi Barai clan to fight the invaders consisting mainly of Mongolian and Goryeo forces, but also including Jurchen people.

== Characters ==
=== Exiles ===
Kuchii Jinzaburō (朽井迅三郎)
Voiced by: Yūki Ono
He is the main character, samurai and excellent swordsman using the Gekei sword style used by Yoshitsune. He is a former retainer of the Kamakura Shogunate and is one of the prisoners from Hakozaki exiled to Tsushima Island. He was imprisoned for being too radical, despite the fact that his master was pardoned posthumously. He had a family, and his child died in a plague.
Onitakemaru (鬼剛丸)
Voiced by: Rikiya Koyama
A large man with sharpened teeth. He is a former pirate who was captured by Jinzaburō which leads to some resentment. He fights with a kanabō war club.
Shiraishi Kazuhisa (白石和久)
Voiced by: Kenji Nomura
A former gokenin noble who lost his lands and title. He prefers fighting on horseback.
Zhāng Míngfú (張明福, Chō Minpuku)
Voiced by: Shirō Saitō
A short man from Song China and a former merchant who claims to have been the richest man in Hakozaki and have a treasure hidden away.
Amushi (阿無志)
Voiced by: Shun Horie
A boy arrested for thievery. He has an excellent night vision and often scouts for the group.
Hitari (火垂)
Voiced by: Ryōta Takeuchi
An aloof man and an excellent archer.
Dōen (導円)
Voiced by: Yūsuke Kobayashi
Dōen is a monk and self-proclaimed doctor.
Obusuma Saburō (男衾三郎)
Voiced by: Kenji Hamada
A former jitō manor steward who murdered his brother. He doubts whether defending Tsushima Island is worthwhile and attempts to side with the Mongols.

=== Sō Clan ===
Teruhi (輝日姫, Teruhi-Hime)
Voiced by: Lynn
Princess Teruhi is the daughter of Sō Sukekuni, head of the Sō clan on Tsushima Island.
Sō Sukekuni (宗助国)
Voiced by: Hidekatsu Shibata
He is the leader of the Sō clan on Tsushima Island. Loves to relive his glorified past. Died at the hands of Goryeo.
Abiru Yajirō (阿比留弥次郎)
Voiced by: Tatsuhisa Suzuki
He is a Tsushima soldier and Sō Sukekuni's adopted son.
Kaitani Gontarō (貝谷権太郎)
Voiced by: Volcano Ōta
He is a soldier, responsible for the protection of Princess Teruhi.
Kano (鹿乃)
Voiced by: Mikako Komatsu
She is Princess Teruhi's servant

=== Toi Barai ===
Magistrate Nagamine (長嶺判官, Nagamine Hangan)
Voiced by: Kenshō Ono
Leader of the Toi Barai. Based in Kanatanoki castle.
Tatsu (タツ)
Voiced by: Asumi Yoneyama
A young dark-skinned woman. She is a fierce fighter and an ama diver.
Sana (サナ)
Voiced by: Natsuko Hara
A young girl who often teases Amushi. She has a pet Tsushima leopard cat.

=== Kamakura Shogunate ===
Hōjō Tokimune (北条時宗)
Shikken of the Kamakura shogunate.
Nagoe Tokiaki (名越時章)
Voiced by: Naomi Kusumi
Ōkura Yorisue (大蔵頼季)
Retainer of the Tokusō.
Voiced by: Yutaka Nakano
Shōni Kagesuke (少弐景資)
Voiced by: Shinnosuke Tachibana
He is the Shogunate High General of the Kamakura shogunate and asks Kuchii Jinzaburō to help delay the Mongol forces who land on Tsushima Island.

=== Yuan dynasty Mongol Empire ===
Hindun (クドゥン, Kudun)
Voiced by: Show Hayami
Marshal of the Mongol forces.
Uriyan Edei (ウリヤンエデイ)
Voiced by: Kentarō Tone
Mongolian royalty and a Mingghan general.
Liu Fuheng (劉復亨, Ryū Fukukō)
Voiced by: Takehito Koyasu
A Jurchen Vice-marshal
Hong Dagu (洪茶丘, Kō Chakyū)
Voiced by: Kazuhiro Nakaya
A Korean Vice-marshal

=== Korea ===
Kim Bang-gyeong (金方慶, Kin Hōkei)
Voiced by: Takashi Matsuyama
General of the Goryeo forces. His son was a Mingghan commander that was killed by Kuchii Jinzaburō.

=== Others ===
Emperor Antoku (安德帝, Antokutei)
Voiced by: Akira Ishida
Former child-Emperor of Japan who supposedly drowned 90 years previously. He is the great-grandfather of Teruhi.
Henry II the Pious
Duke of Silesia and Cracow. Killed by Mongols.

== Media ==
=== Manga ===
Nanahiko Takagi launched the series in Kadokawa Shoten's Samurai Ace magazine on February 26, 2013. The series went on hiatus after Samurai Ace ceased publication in December 2013. It was then moved to Kadokawa's ComicWalker app starting on July 11, 2014. The last chapter was released on ComicWalker on August 22, 2018. The series was collected in ten volumes released from February 10, 2015, to August 25, 2018. A sequel, Angolmois: Genkō Kassen-ki Hakata-hen, started on ComicWalker on January 2, 2019.

==== Volumes ====
No.	Japanese release date	Japanese ISBN
1	February 10, 2015	978-4-04-102783-7
2	March 10, 2015	978-4-04-102784-4
3	June 26, 2015	978-4-04-103398-2
4	October 26, 2015	978-4-04-103399-9
5	February 26, 2016	978-4-04-103936-6
6	August 26, 2016	978-4-04-104407-0
7	March 10, 2017	978-4-04-104409-4
8	August 26, 2017	978-4-04-104410-0
9	March 26, 2018	978-4-04-106558-7
10	August 25, 2018	978-4-04-106559-4

=== Anime ===
Kadokawa announced the anime adaptation at their Anime Expo booth on July 1, 2017. The series was directed by Takayuki Kuriyama and written by Shogo Yasukawa, with animation by studio Naz. Masayori Komine served as both character designer and as chief animation director. Kumiko Habara served as assistant director. Straightener performed the series' opening theme song, "Braver", and She's performed the ending theme song "Upside Down".

The series aired from July 11 (Note: The series was listed to premiere on July 10 at 24:30, which is the same as July 11 at 12:30 AM.) to September 26, 2018, and broadcast on Sun TV, Tokyo MX, KBS Kyoto, TV Aichi, TVQ Broadcasting Kyushu, and BS11. It ran for 12 episodes. Crunchyroll simulcast the series worldwide outside of Asia, Australia, and New Zealand.

==== Episodes ====
No.	Title	Original release date
1	"The Far End of Japan" "Sotto no Saihate" (Japanese: 率土の最果て)	July 11, 2018
A group of exiles are being taken by boat to Tsushima Island when they are caught in a savage storm. They plead for their bonds to be removed, but then take over the boat and commence fighting among themselves. Kuchii Jinzaburō, saves Chō Minpuku, a fellow exile, and then fights to defend himself from other prisoners. He frees the pirate Onitakemaru who raises the mast and helps sail the boat towards Tsushima Island. On arrival, the boatload of exiles and crew are warmly welcomed by Princess Teruhi, but then find they are asked to defend the island against the Mukuri (Mongols). Pressed by Jinzaburō, Teruhi tells them that she had asked the Dazaifu magistrate to send able-bodied prisoners to support her. That night, masked intruders attack and the prisoners free themselves. Kaitani Gontarō tries to fight them off, but the princess is captured. Onitakemaru and then Jinzaburō intervene, Jinzaburō killing all but one of the masked attackers and rescuing Teruhi. The next day, overlooking the slain, Teruhi is distraught at the carnage of war, but Jinzaburō tells her it is just a skirmish. She promises him a reward and asks for his aid. The next day, October 3 of the 11th year of the Bunmei era, Kano reports that a fleet of Mukuri ships are heading for Tsushima Island.
2	"The War God of Sasu" "Sasu no Ikusagami" (Japanese: 佐須の戦神)	July 18, 2018
Teruhi invites Jinzaburō to a strategy conference, but is ejected by Sō Sukekuni after disagreeing with his assumption that the Mongols will pass Tsushima. He meets Shōni Kagasuke, dressed as a monk, who asks him to help defend Tsushima for 7 days while he readies reinforcements, presenting him with the favourite sword of Minamato no Yoshitsune. The next day, the Mongol fleet lands at Sasu Bay and Sō Sukekuni rides overnight with his forces to meet them. Sō Sukekuni orders Jinzaburō to the rear to protect Teruhi and prepares to repel the invaders. After withstanding volleys of arrows from the advance party of Mongols, Sō Sukekuni's men push them back to the shore where they find the Sasu villagers slaughtered. However after the initial victory, the force of 200 soldiers and 80 horses are assaulted by explosives fired from the ships and are overwhelmed by a larger force of 1,000 Goryeo soldiers and Sō Sukekuni is killed.
3	"Time to Strike" "Seme-Ji" (Japanese: 攻め時)	July 25, 2018
As the surviving Tsushima soldiers retreat, they are confronted by Jinzaburō wearing Tsushima armor who tells them to stop and fight the pursuing Goryeo soldiers. They are reluctant to follow an exile, but when Jinzaburō and some of the other exiles attack the pursuers, the Tsushima soldiers turn and follow them. Obusama Saburō, Shiraishi Kazuhisa and Hitari support the attack, forcing the invaders to fall back and regroup. Jinzaburō insists on pursuing them, however Abiru Yajirō urges caution and does not follow. Meanwhile, the exiles and supporting soldiers are surrounded by the more numerous invading forces, but led by Jinzaburō they manage to break through to their headquarters, slaying their general and his men before returning with the heads of the slain Sō Sukekuni and Umajirō. Teruhi entreats the villagers of Sasu to join them in defending the capital, but Jinzaburō insists on a night raid on the invaders. Abiru Yajirō disagrees and returns to the capital. Using Amushi as a lookout Jinzaburō prepares to lead them on a hit and run raid against the small invading force by moonlight. However they are betrayed by two Sasu villagers, and when villager Ginshichi tries to kill Jinzaburō from behind, Teruhi distracts him and is cut by his sword.
4	"Back to the Capital" "Kokufu e" (Japanese: 国府へ)	August 1, 2018
Jinzaburō kills Ginshichi and sends the wounded Teruhi back. Then, throwing caution to the wind, he leads the night attack on the now prepared Goryeo forces. Onitakemaru opens a path through their defenses, but the Goryeo Commander, Kim Bang-gyeong and the Mongol vice-Marshal Liu Fuheng are unperturbed, suspecting they are under attack by only a small Tsushima force. Having caused enough fear and damage, Jinzaburō orders a retreat, even after hearing the cries of the Sasu village women and children held captive. Suddenly, a small Toibarai force assaults the Goryeo soldiers with arrows, giving Jinzaburō's men an opportunity to rescue the villagers. Before they retreat, the Toibarai commander, Nagamine Hangan, tells Jinzaburō they are acting under orders from Japan. Meanwhile, Liu Fuheng wants to capture the fighter who slayed their general days earlier and decides to pursue Jinzaburō himself. He first encounters Onitakemaru, then is confronted by Jinzaburō, but is prevented from chasing them into the night by his men. The Mongol army Marshal, Hindin, is advised by his priest that they should leave for Hakata in 7 days, so Hindin decides to continue his invasion of Tsushima. Meanwhile, while returning to the capital, Jinzaburō supports Ginshichi's son Sasamauru from being bullied by the other Sasu survivors.
5	"Resolve" "Kakugo" (Japanese: 覚悟)	August 8, 2018
Returning to the capital Teruhi and Jinzaburō's group see the city the distance, in flames after an attack by the Mongols. They find some survivors led by Abiru Yajirō who says that other survivors are scattered throughout the hills. Before they can devise a plan, they are detected by a small group of Mongol scouts and Teruhi fires arrows at them in frustration and anger. Amushi then sees a large force marching towards them, who are led by the Mongul Mingghan Commander, Uriyan Edei. As the survivors head for shelter at Aso Bay, an old woman inspires some soldiers to stop and fight a rearguard action along with the exiles. On the narrow trail, Jinzaburō plans a strategic defense based on his fighting experience. Jinzaburō tells Abiru of his time in Kamakura with Nagoe Tokaiki of the Hōjō clan who told him that playing shogi and war were the same, and to never lose sight of the big picture. He also learned that if you lay down your sword you can never win. Just then, the monguls attack with explosives and charge through the blinding smoke. However, the defending forces led by Jinzaburō recover and decimate the attackers with arrows. Following this experience, Abiru finds newfound resolve and promises to support Jinzaburō.
6	"Where Death Leads" "Konoshi no Yukusue" (Japanese: この死の行く末)	August 15, 2018
Mongul Mingghan Commander Uriyan Edei proposes that they use their shintenrai (震天雷, "heaven-shaking thunder") hand cannons against the defenders to reduce casualties among his men. From a distance, Teruhi and Harari try to shoot him with their bows but fail. Jinzaburō and Abiru's group prepare to withdraw, but suddenly Chinese soldiers, in the Mongol army, shoot Abiru with a shintenrai, killing him. Meanwhile, the Goryeo troops from Sasu begin to approach from the west. Jinzaburō hopes the two different armies will be confused when they meet in the fading light. When the Goryeo and Mongols meet they start fighting over valuables left behind by the fleeing islanders, allowing the defenders to escape north. That night, Teruhi and Jinzaburō are approached by an old man who is with the Toibarai. Jinzaburō follows him through the night, and at dawn finds himself on the peak of Mt. Shiratake and is introduced to Tokihito, known as the Emperor Antoku.
7	"Kanatanoki" "Kanatanoki" (Japanese: 金田城)	August 22, 2018
In a flashback, Emperor Antoku gives the High General of the Genji Forces, Minamoto-no-Kurō-Yoshitune a short sword. Back in the present, the Emperor recognizes the same sword carried by Jinzaburō. Teruhi then arrives and is welcomed by her great-grandfather the Emperor who gives her a message for the Magistrate Nagamine of the Toibarai - to protect Sasu and the capital. Teruhi swears to protect the island, but her Sō clan are unhappy about relying on the Toibarai. When the survivors arrive at Aso Bay, they find the Toibarai women abalone divers have led a small seaborne advance party of Mongols into a trap, killing them all. They also discover that the invaders are composed of many different groups, and these are Jurchen. Teruhi gives Nagamine the message from the Emperor, and he agrees to help her, taking the Sō survivors to their castle, Kanatanoki. First built 600 years earlier, the Sō discover the castle is well-fortified and supplied, however Jinzaburō declares that it is too big to defend with the limited forces they have.
8	"Betrayer's Strike" "Haishin no Hitotachi" (Japanese: 背信の一太刀)	August 29, 2018
The exile Obusuma Saburō tells fellow exile Shiraishi that they have no responsibility to defend Tsushima. Meanwhile Nagamine tells Jinzaburō that the Toibarai will never abandon their castle fortress even though they lack numbers to adequately defend it. After sparring with some Toibarai soldiers who challenge him, Jinzaburō promises Nagamine that he will help with their defense. Meanwhile Obusuma reveals to Shiraishi that he has a pass enabling him to safely contact the Mongols, saying he's happy to serve whoever rewards his effort. Shiraishi refuses to join him, but he kills Obusuma whom he distrusts, and takes the pass himself. In the Mongol camp, Obusuma Uriyan Edei's commanders are frustrated of the disappearance of the Japanese islanders, but Uriyan Edei only agrees to pursue them if he has verified information about their location. At the Chikuzen Dazaifu Magistrate Fortress on the mainland, they prepare to reinforce the Tsushima defenders who are hoping for reinforcements, but doubt that they will arrive in time. Meanwhile, Shiraishi approaches the Mongols himself and offers information about a weakness in the castle fortification. He later returns to the castle with a dead boar to allay suspicions about his disappearance.
9	"Battle of the Mountain Castle" "Yamashiro no Kōbō" (Japanese: 山城の攻防)	September 5, 2018
Teruhi entreats her followers to support the Toibarai in their defense of Kanatanoki, although outnumbered almost six to one. They concentrate most of the forces at the main South Gate, while Shiraishi offers to defend the west wall at the rear. Meanwhile Mongol Commander Choukuru speeds to be the first to attack the defenders but runs into a trap laid by Jinzaburou and a small Toibarai force. Choukuru's force is drawn to attack the heavily defended South Gate, but are stopped by the experienced defenders. Commander Funbishi then arrives with orders to keep the defenders fully occupied while Commander Ochirubato circles around to the west wall. Meanwhile Shiraishi sends the Toibarai soldiers from the North Gate to the South Gate, allowing the Mongols to scale the wall and enter. However, Ochirubato falls into a trap, and is burned along with his men, giving the impression that the citadel is ablaze. While the Mongols hesitate, Jinzaburou leads a cavalry charge into their midst, almost killing Uriyan Edei who decides to withdraw and focus on their main objective, the conquest of Japan. When the breach at the west wall is discovered, Jinzaburou goes to investigate, and finds the traitor Shiraishi waiting for him.
10	"Bad Omen" "Kyōchō" (Japanese: 凶兆)	September 12, 2018
Jinzaburou confronts Shiraishi who says he only cares about recovering his clan and his lands. Jinzaburou defeats him and Teruhi takes his head. That night Teruhi kisses Jinzaburou while he is asleep, conflicted about his coarse manner and his bravery. Meanwhile Chō Minpuku has prepared a small boat loaded with supplies to abandon the island, but only Onitakemaru agrees to leave with him. In the Toibarai fortress, while seeking an omen for the future, the elder dies, but Nagamine holds firm, maintaining morale. The Mongol army Vice Marshal, Kou Chakyuu prepares to attack the fortress, and uses flaming torches to show the scale of his army. At Hakata on Kyushuu, Kagesuke the son of the Shouni clan patriarch, Shouni Sukeyoshi prepares to send reinforcements to Tsushima but his father stops him, preferring instead to save his forces for after the invasion to fight against the other Kyushuu clans. Back on Tsushima, what initially appears to be reinforcements sailing towards the defenders turns out to be a fleet of Mongol Ships.
11	"The Sun God of Tsushima" "Tsushima no Tendō" (Japanese: 対馬の天道)	September 19, 2018
When asked why he fights for Tsushima Island, Jinzaburou simply answers that there is something worth fighting for. The full force of the Mongol army assaults the main South Gate of the fortress defended by Nagamine and the Toibarai. The Mongols have only until sundown to win the battle before they must set sail for the invasion of the Japanese mainland. Nagamine sends Jinzaburou to reinforce the east wall where Teruhi and a small group are under attack. Soon, the Mongols breach the South Gate and kill Tatsu and Nagamine and the rest of the defenders. With the walls breached, Jinzaburou advises the survivors to retreat and surrender the fortress. He is joined by a small group of Tsushima soldiers and Onitakemaru who returned to the island. The defenders fight a rearguard action, with Dōen and Hitari losing their lives, but allowing at least Teruhi and some others to retreat to the ocean cliffs. However, an explosive fired by the Mongols sends Jinzaburou falling into the water far below.
12	"The Best You Can Do" "Isshokenmei" (Japanese: 一所懸命)	September 26, 2018
With Jinzaburou gone, the remaining Tsushima forces fight a losing battle against the advancing Mongol army. However Sana takes Teruhi and leads a small group into the forest towards a hidden cave. Amushi causes a distraction by exploding a bomb in the Mongol camp, but is killed as he tries to escape. The group are later found by the Mongols who kill Kaitani Gontarō and wipe out the remaining Tsushima forces. With the situation looking hopeless, Kano tearfully chokes Teruhi to kill her before the Mongols find her, but then acts as a decoy and is captured. As Jinzaburou sinks deeper into the water he recalls the Kuchii household four years earlier, when his daughter defied him to protect a tree and he regains consciousness, rising to the surface. He reaches the scene of the final battle of the Tsushima forces and finds only the survivor is a young boy whose father he killed earlier. Taking his sword, Jinzaburou recklessly attacks the remaining Mongol forces and comes up against the commander, Ryuu Fukukō. After a vicious battle Jinzaburou disarms the Mongol leader and leaves, untouched by the Mongols. As the Mongols prepare to depart and invade Kyushu, Teruhi emerges from where Kano hid her to find Jinzaburou standing alone. Slowly, the surviving villagers and children emerge from the forest and Teruhi declares that Tsushima is not finished yet.
