= Kaneishi Castle =

Kaneishi Castle 金石城
- Tsushima, Nagasaki Prefecture, Japan
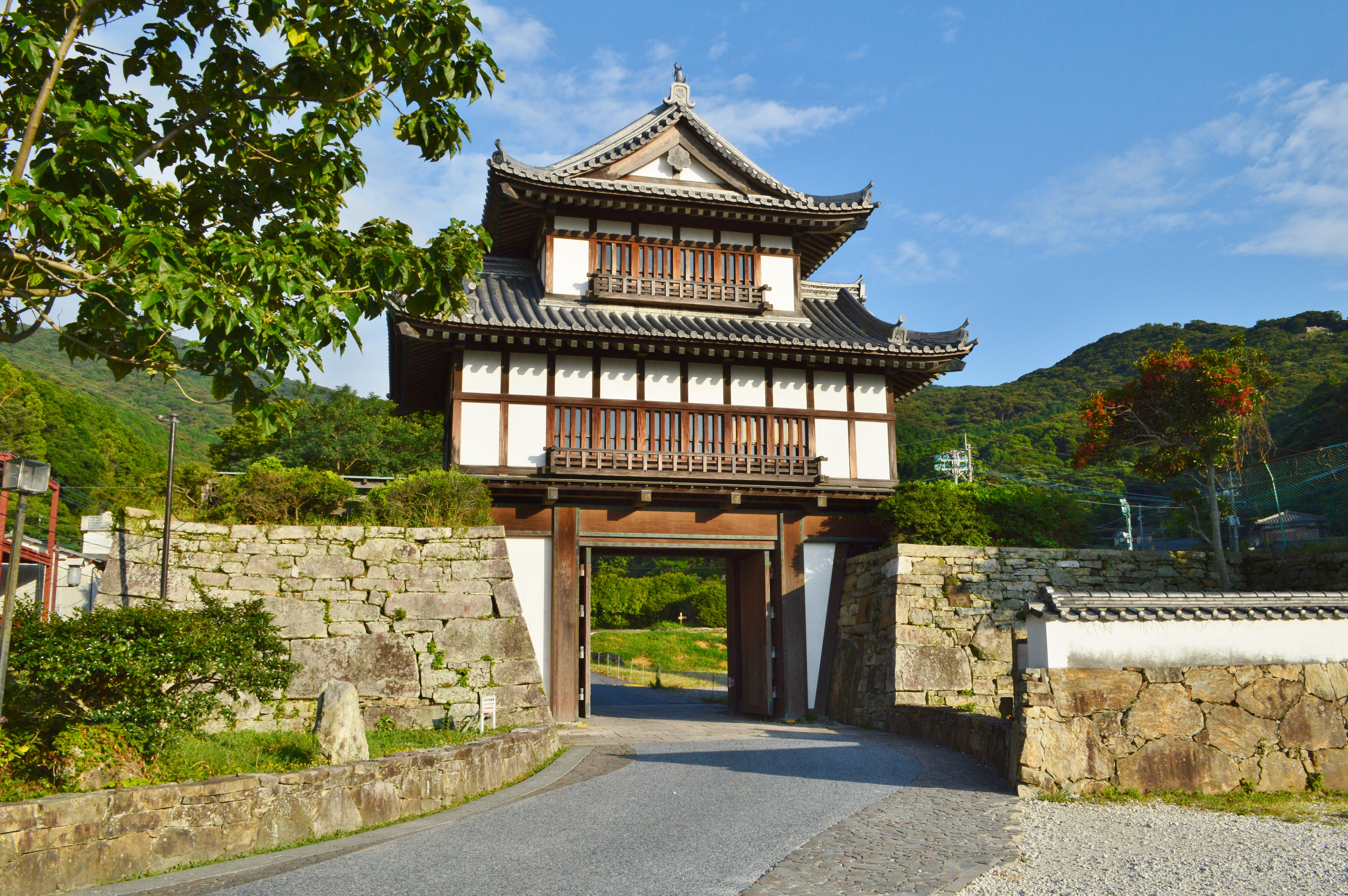
- Reconstructed Yaguramon of Kaneishi Castle

Site information
- Type: flatland-style Japanese castle
- Open to the public: yes
- Condition: partially reconstructed

Location
- Coordinates: 34°12′15.1″N 129°17′10.0″E

Site history
- Built: 1528
- Built by: Sō clan
- In use: Edo period
- Demolished: 1871
- National Historic Site of Japan National Place of Scenic Beauty

Kaneishi Castle (金石城, Kaneishi-jō) is a Japanese castle located in the Izuhara neighborhood of the city of Tsushima, Nagasaki Prefecture, Japan. Its ruins have been protected as a National Historic Site since 1995.

== Background ==
Kaneishi Castle is a flatland-style Japanese castle, located at the foot of Shimizuyama, a mountain which had been fortified during the Japanese invasions of Korea (1592–1598), and which was the stronghold of the Sō clan. It was originally called the "Kaneishi-no-yakata", and began as a fortified residence built by Sō Masamori in 1528. According to the Sō clan history, the site was that of the kokubunji of Tsushima Province. It was remodeled in the Edo period with the addition of stone walls and moats, as it was on the route taken by Korean emissaries to the court of the Tokugawa shogunate in Edo. No tenshu was every constructed, but the yagura watchtower constructed in 1669 by Sō Yoshizane over the main gate of the castle was used for this purpose. It remained the seat of Tsushima Domain until the completion of Sajikibara Castle in 1687. It was retained as a secondary mansion for the clan, and was expanded in 1811 to improve on the lodging for the Korean embassy. The main gate was demolished in 1919 due to deterioration. It was restored in 1990 based on old photographs and models.

The remains of the castle ruins that remain in good condition include the masagata-style east gate, including the Otemon Yaguramon gate, and the masagata-style west gate and the surrounding stone walls, as well as the stone walls along the Kanaishi River.

Per old records, there was a garden with a pond in the northwest corner of the castle grounds, where the daimyō residence was located. After the Meiji restoration, this area became the Izuhara Junior High School. Archaeological excavations conducted from 1997 to 2004 confirmed that a pond in the school grounds was a surviving remnant of the daimyō garden. The garden has been restored, and is now designated a National Place of Scenic Beauty. The large and small decorative stones arranged around the edge of the pond, which has varying levels, and the view of the pebbles sinking into the water below, are thought to be modeled after the scenery on the eastern coast of Tsushima.

== See also ==
- List of Historic Sites of Japan (Nagasaki)
- List of Places of Scenic Beauty of Japan (Nagasaki)

== Literature ==
- De Lange, William (2021). An Encyclopedia of Japanese Castles. Groningen: Toyo Press. pp. 600 pages. ISBN 978-9492722300.
- Schmorleitz, Morton S. (1974). Castles in Japan. Tokyo: Charles E. Tuttle Co. pp. 144–145. ISBN 0-8048-1102-4.
- Turnbull, Stephen (2003). Japanese Castles 1540-1640. Osprey Publishing. p. 64 pages. ISBN 1-84176-429-9.
