= Battle of Tsushima (1274) =

Battle during the First Mongol invasion of Japan

- Part of the First Mongol invasions of Japan
Date	2–5 November 1274
Location	Tsushima Island, Kamakura shogunate (modern Japan) 34°25′N 129°20′E
Result	Yuan victory
Territorial changes	Yuan army captures Tsushima Island

Belligerents
Yuan dynasty; Goryeo	Kamakura shogunate; Sō clan

Commanders and leaders
Unknown	Sō Sukekuni †
- Location of the battle on a map of modern Japan Tsushima (Nagasaki Prefecture)

The Battle of Tsushima (1274) was a first engagement during the Bun’ei Campaign, fought on 2–5 November 1274 during the First Mongol invasion of Japan. Yuan forces landed on Tsushima Island from Goryeo, where they faced Japanese defenders led by Sō Sukekuni. After fighting the Yuan forces, the defenders were defeated and the island fell to the Yuan army, allowing the Yuan forces to continue their advance towards Iki Island.

== Battle ==
In 1274, Yuan forces landed on Tsushima Island from Goryeo, where the army encountered Japanese defenders led by Sō Sukekuni. Sō was a brave samurai and his clan served as the governor of Tsushima for generations.

Yuan forces defeated the defenders quickly. They met on the beach, but the defenders was forced back by Yuan's arrow fire.

== Aftermath ==
After capturing Tsushima, Yuan forces advanced towards Iki Island. On 14 November 1274, the Mongols attacked Iki, where a fierce battle was fought again. After the battles, the Kamakura shogunate decided to strengthen coastal defense. They also began developing their own naval force against Yuan's attack.

== See also ==
- Mongol invasions of Japan
- Battle of Iki (1274)
- Battle of Bun'ei
