= Siege of Busanjin =

1592 Japan–Korea battle in Korea

Siege of Busan Castle
- Part of Imjin War
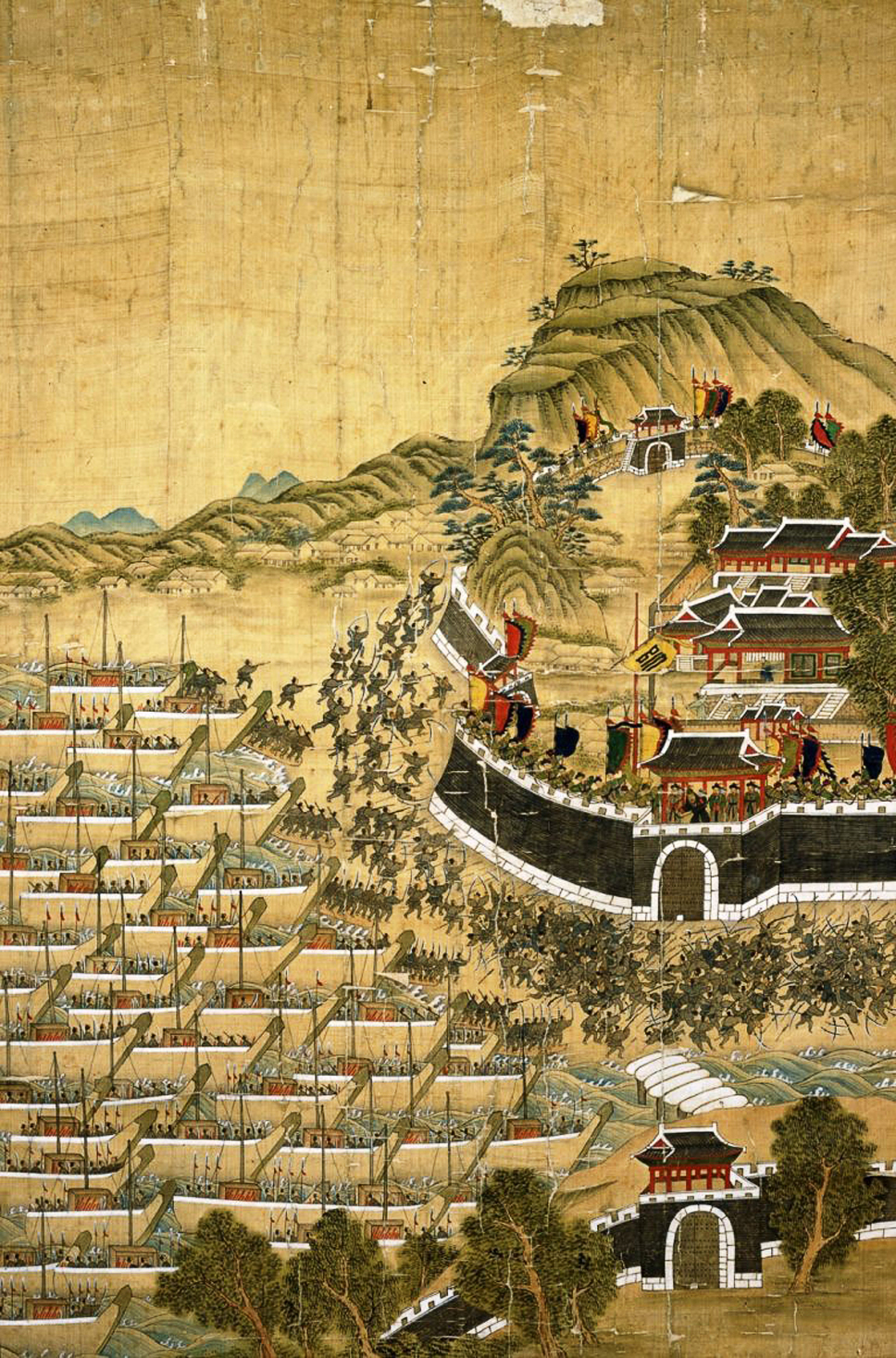
- The siege of Busan Castle
Date	24 May 1592
Location	Busanjin-gu, Busan
Result	Japanese victory

Belligerents
Toyotomi Japan	Joseon Korea

Commanders and leaders
Sō Yoshitoshi	Chŏng Pal †

Strength
16,700	20,000

Casualties and losses
?	1,200–8,500 killed Including civillian 200 captured

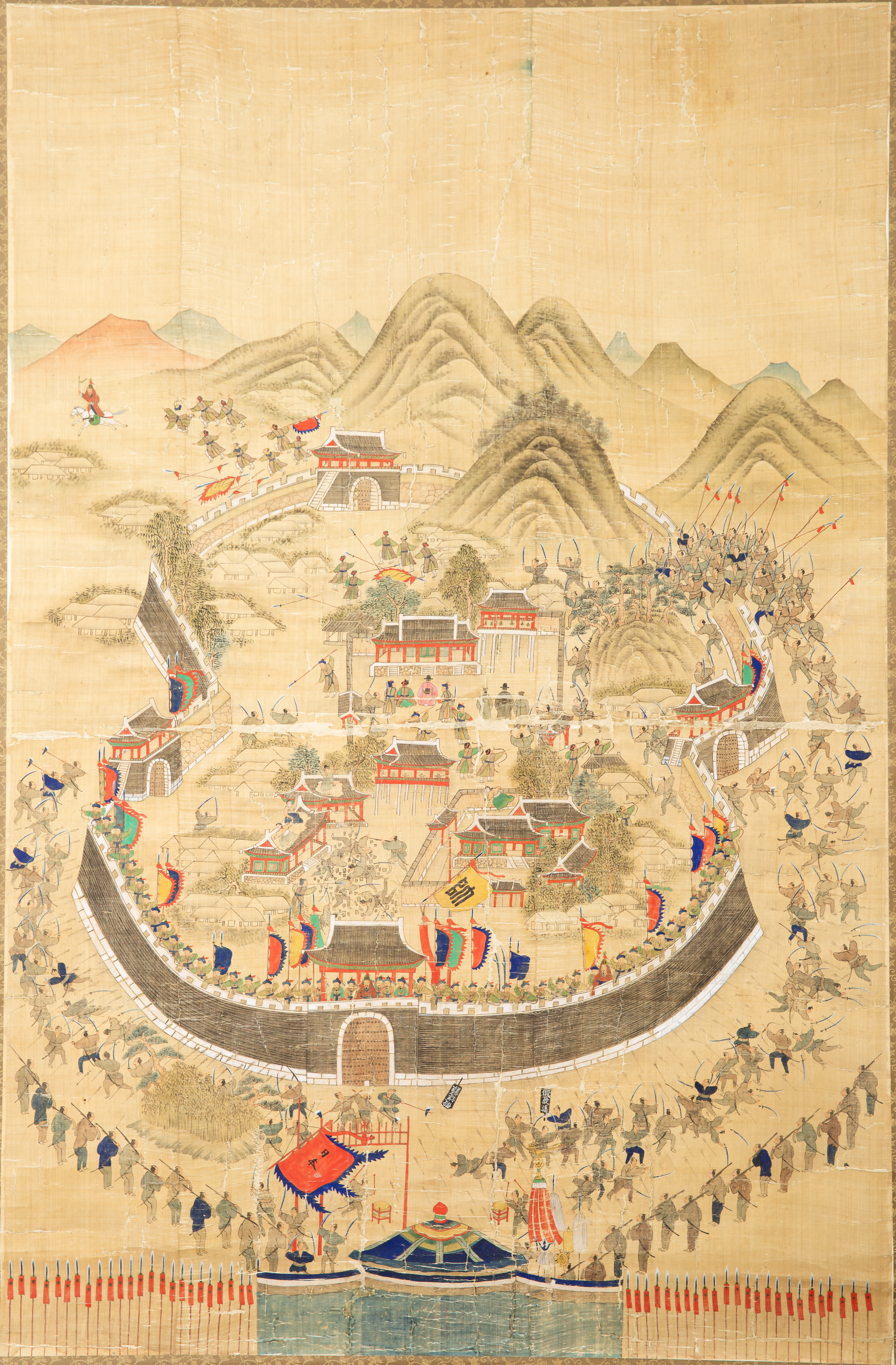
Japanese army sacks the city of Busan.

The siege of Busanjin (Korean: 부산진 전투; Hanja: 釜山鎭戰鬪) was a battle fought at Busan on 24 May 1592, between Japanese and Korean forces. The attacks on Busan and the neighboring fort of Dadaejin were the first battles of the Japanese invasions of Korea (1592–98).

== Background ==
The Japanese invasion force consisting of 400 transports bearing 18,700 men under the command of Konishi Yukinaga departed from Tsushima Island on 23 May and arrived at Busan harbor without any incident. The commander of Busan, Chŏng Pal, spotted the invasion fleet while hunting on Yeong Island off Busan Harbor and rushed back to Busan to prepare defenses. A single vessel bearing the daimyō of Tsushima Sō Yoshitoshi (who had been a member of the Japanese mission to Korea in 1589) detached from the Japanese fleet with a letter to the commander of Busan, Chŏng Pal, demanding that the Korean forces stand down to allow the Japanese armies to proceed on towards China. The letter went unanswered, and the Japanese commenced landing operations from 0400 the following morning.

The Joseon fleet of 150 ships did nothing and sat idle at port while Gyeongsang Left Navy Commander Pak Hong reported to Gyeongsang Right Navy Commander Wŏn Kyun, who thought the invasion might have been a really large trade mission.

The commanders of the Japanese forces were Konishi, Sō, Matsura Shigenobu, Arima Harunobu, Ōmura Yoshiaki and Gotō Mototsugu, all of whom (with the exception of Matsura) were Kirishitans, as were many of their men. A portion of this force led by Konishi attacked a nearby fort called Dadaejin, while Sō led the main contingent against Busan.

== Battle ==
Early in the morning of May 24, 1592, Sō Yoshitoshi once again called up Joeng Bal to stand down, assuring that he and his men would be safe if they would stand aside and allow the Japanese to pass. Jeong refused, stating that he was duty bound to oppose the Japanese advance unless he received orders from Seoul to do otherwise, and the Japanese attack then commenced. The Japanese tried to take the south gate of Busan Castle first but took heavy casualties and were forced to switch to the north gate. The Japanese took high ground positions on the mountain behind Busan and shot at Korean defenders within the city with their arquebuses until they created a breach in their northern defenses. The Koreans, armed primarily with bows and spears, were outranged by Japanese firepower, and soon ran out of arrows. Commander Chŏng Pal was struck by a bullet and died at around 0900, causing morale to collapse and the swift fall of the city.

== Aftermath ==
Once within the walls of the fortification, the Japanese massacred thousands. "Both men, women, and even dogs and cats were beheaded." According to Japanese records, 8500 Koreans were killed in at Busan and 200 were taken prisoner.

Gyeongsang Left Navy Commander Pak Hong watched the fall of Busan from a distance. He then scuttled his fleet of 100 ships, which included more than 50 warships armed with cannon, and destroyed his weapons and provisions, so that they would not fall into Japanese hands. Abandoning his men, he fled to Hanseong.

The following day, Konishi recombined his forces, and then advanced towards the fortress of Dongnae located ten kilometers northeast on the main road to Seoul.

== Legacy ==
With the port in Japanese hands, the area became the primary landing ground for subsequent Japanese deployments to Korea during the Japanese invasion, notably the large army led by Kato Kiyomasa and the slightly smaller army led by Kuroda Nagamasa. It was also the primary Japanese supply base throughout the conflict.

To commemorate the battle, there is a statue of Chŏng Pal next to the Japanese Consulate in Busan.

== See also ==
- List of fortresses in Korea

== Bibliography ==
- Alagappa, Muthiah (2003), Asian Security Order: Instrumental and Normative Features, Stanford University Press, ISBN 978-0-8047-4629-8
- Arano, Yasunori (2005), The Formation of a Japanocentric World Order, International Journal of Asian Studies
- Brown, Delmer M. (May 1948), "The Impact of Firearms on Japanese Warfare, 1543–1598", The Far Eastern Quarterly, 7 (3): 236–53, doi:10.2307/2048846, JSTOR 2048846, S2CID 162924328
- Eikenberry, Karl W. (1988), "The Imjin War", Military Review, 68 (2): 74–82
- Ha, Tae-hung; Sohn, Pow-key (1977), 'Nanjung Ilgi: War Diary of Admiral Yi Sun-sin, Yonsei University Press, ISBN 978-89-7141-018-9
- Haboush, JaHyun Kim (2016), The Great East Asian War and the Birth of the Korean Nation
- Hawley, Samuel (2005), The Imjin War, The Royal Asiatic Society, Korea Branch/UC Berkeley Press, ISBN 978-89-954424-2-5
- Jang, Pyun-soon (1998), Noon-eu-ro Bo-nen Han-gook-yauk-sa 5: Gor-yeo Si-dae (눈으로 보는 한국역사 5: 고려시대), Park Doo-ui, Bae Keum-ram, Yi Sang-mi, Kim Ho-hyun, Kim Pyung-sook, et al., Joog-ang Gyo-yook-yaun-goo-won. 1998-10-30. Seoul, Korea.
- Kim, Ki-chung (Fall 1999), "Resistance, Abduction, and Survival: The Documentary Literature of the Imjin War (1592–8)", Korean Culture, 20 (3): 20–29
- Kim, Yung-sik (1998), "Problems and Possibilities in the Study of the History of Korean Science", Osiris, 2nd Series, 13: 48–79, doi:10.1086/649280, JSTOR 301878, S2CID 143724260
- 桑田忠親 [Kuwata, Tadachika], ed., 舊參謀本部編纂, [Kyu Sanbo Honbu], 朝鮮の役 [Chousen no Eki] (日本の戰史 [Nihon no Senshi] Vol. 5), 1965.
- Neves, Jaime Ramalhete (1994), "The Portuguese in the Im-Jim War?", Review of Culture, 18: 20–24
- Niderost, Eric (June 2001), "Turtleboat Destiny: The Imjin War and Yi Sun Shin", Military Heritage, 2 (6): 50–59, 89
- Niderost, Eric (January 2002), "The Miracle at Myongnyang, 1597", Osprey Military Journal, 4 (1): 44–50
- Park, Yune-hee (1973), Admiral Yi Sun-shin and His Turtleboat Armada: A Comprehensive Account of the Resistance of Korea to the 16th Century Japanese Invasion, Shinsaeng Press
- Rockstein, Edward D. (1993), Strategic And Operational Aspects of Japan's Invasions of Korea 1592–1598 1993-6-18, Naval War College
- Sadler, A. L. (June 1937), "The Naval Campaign in the Korean War of Hideyoshi (1592–1598)", Transactions of the Asiatic Society of Japan, Second Series, 14: 179–208
- Sansom, George (1961), A History of Japan 1334–1615, Stanford University Press, ISBN 978-0-8047-0525-7
- Sohn, Pow-key (April–June 1959), "Early Korean Painting", Journal of the American Oriental Society, 79 (2): 96–103, doi:10.2307/595851, JSTOR 595851
- Stramigioli, Giuliana (December 1954), "Hideyoshi's Expansionist Policy on the Asiatic Mainland", Transactions of the Asiatic Society of Japan, Third Series, 3: 74–116
- Strauss, Barry (Summer 2005), "Korea's Legendary Admiral", MHQ: The Quarterly Journal of Military History, 17 (4): 52–61
- Swope, Kenneth M. (2006), "Beyond Turtleboats: Siege Accounts from Hideyoshi's Second Invasion of Korea, 1597–1598", Sungkyun Journal of East Asian Studies, 6 (2): 177–206
- Swope, Kenneth M. (2005), "Crouching Tigers, Secret Weapons: Military Technology Employed During the Sino-Japanese-Korean War, 1592–1598", The Journal of Military History, 69: 11–42, doi:10.1353/jmh.2005.0059, S2CID 159829515
- Swope, Kenneth M. (December 2002), "Deceit, Disguise, and Dependence: China, Japan, and the Future of the Tributary System, 1592–1596", The International History Review, 24 (4): 757–1008, doi:10.1080/07075332.2002.9640980, S2CID 154827808
- Swope, Kenneth M. (2009), A Dragon's Head and a Serpent's Tail: Ming China and the First Great East Asian War, 1592–1598, University of Oklahoma Press
- Turnbull, Stephen (2002), Samurai Invasion: Japan's Korean War 1592–98, Cassell & Co, ISBN 978-0-304-35948-6
- Turnbull, Stephen (2008), The Samurai Invasion of Korea 1592-98, Osprey Publishing Ltd
- Turnbull, Stephen (1998), The Samurai Sourcebook, Cassell & Co, ISBN 978-1-85409-523-7
- Villiers, John (1980). "Silk and Silver: Macau, Manila and Trade in the China Seas in the Sixteenth Century (A lecture delivered to the Hong Kong Branch of the Royal Asiatic Society at the Hong Kong Club. 10 June 1980.)" (PDF). Journal of the Royal Asiatic Society Hong Kong Branch. 20. ISSN 1991-7295.
- Yi, Min-woong (2004), Imjin Wae-ran Haejeonsa: The Naval Battles of the Imjin War [임진왜란 해전사], Chongoram Media [청어람미디어], ISBN 978-89-89722-49-6
