= Koremune clan =

Japanese samurai clan

Koremune 惟宗
- Home province: Yamashiro; Tsushima; Satsuma; etc
- Parent house: Hata clan
- Titles: Ason
- Founder: Koremune no Naomune; Koremune no Naomoto
- Cadet branches: Sō clan; Shimazu clan; Akishi clan; Ichikishi clan; Jinbō clan; Kabayama clan; Kawahara clan; Kawamata clan; Shūin clan; etc

Koremune clan (惟宗氏, Koremune-shi) was a Japanese clan during the Heian period that claimed descent from the Hata clan.

== History ==
Its parent clan (Hata clan) is believed to have immigrated to Japan from Korea during the Kofun period.

It is said that the clan was founded by two brothers, Koremune no Naomune, and Koremune no Naomoto. The two brothers were originally under the title of "Hata no Kimi (秦公)" of the Hata clan, but moved provinces where in 883, they were declared as the founders of the Koremune clan alongside fellow Hata clan members with the titles of Hata no Sukune (秦宿禰) and Hata no Imiki (秦忌寸). It was around this time when the Hata clan was either completely succeeded or absorbed by the Koremune family (late 9th century).

Areas the Koremune family had jurisdiction over mostly included provinces from Kyushu and Tsushima. Unlike its parent clan which had influence in the Kansai region, specifically in Sagano/嵯峨野 (present-day Kyoto), the relocation of Koremune no Naomune and Koremune no Naomoto to Kyushu caused the clan to become one of the dominant families in the western regions of Japan. This resettlement of power within Kyushu was carried over to the Shimazu clan which became one of the most important clans during the Sengoku period. The Shimazu clan later settled downwards in Kyushu to where Satsuma is today.

Its other branch clan, the Sō clan also settled in Tsushima and Kyushu (earlier than the Shimazu clan) and tried to exercise its influence. However, unlike the Shimazu clan which remained dominant in the region, the Sō clan's plans to remain in Kyushu was thwarted by the Ōuchi clan in the mid-15th century, a fellow powerful clan in Kyushu and another clan of Korean descent. Therefore, the Sō clan stayed within the Tsushima Island. Ironically, the Sō clan also tried keeping good ties with Korea, similar to the Ōuchi clan, and tried monopolizing trades with the Joseon dynasty.

The two famous branch clans of the Koremune clan, the Shimazu clan and the Sō clan, both fought with other clans of Fujiwara descent (i.e. Ōtomo, Itō, Ryūzōji, Sagara) which were concentrated in central Kyushu, holding the regions of southernmost Kyushu (Shimazu) and the island of Tsushima above it (Sō).

In the end, the Koremune clan itself is believed to have been absorbed by its branch clans before dissolution as they grew in power and the Koremune clan's influence weakened.

== Influence ==
The clan rose to prominence and was given the Ason title under the kabane system. The members of the family were known for their legal expertise regarding law, and many of the clan members became great writers; where several of their works became classic texts of Japan's history.

One notable member was Koremune no Masasuke (also known as Koremune no Tadasuke) who was allegedly a descendant of the founder, Koremune no Naomune. Masasuke, who later changed his surname from Koremune to "Yoshimune (令宗)", became the father of the Myōbōdō, a judicial system that was formed from the historical Ritsuryō, which in turn was influenced by Chinese Legalism.

Many other descendants of the Koremune clan also became powerful individuals in the Western Japan region, specifically in Chūgoku, Shikoku, Kyushu, and Tsushima.

== Legacy ==
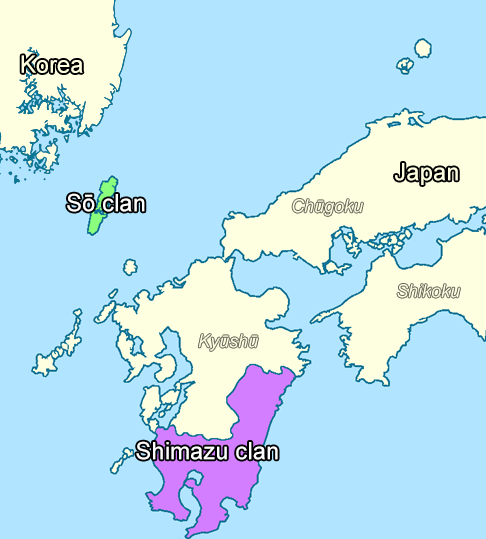
The Sō clan and the Shimazu clan, two most influential descendant clans of the Koremune clan.

Several of Koremune clan's members founded other influential clans such as the Shimazu clan and the Sō clan. The Sō, written as "宗" in particular, is believed to have derived from Koremune's characters "惟宗" where they took the last letter of their parent clan to create their own cadet branch.

In regards to the Shimazu clan, it is said that the clan's founder (Shimazu Tadahisa)'s wife (Lady Sadatake) was of Koremune descent. Shimazu Tadahisa claimed descent of the Seiwa Genji (Minamoto) line. However, in recent times, it is said that Tadahisa himself was also from the Koremune family, making the Shimazu clan a direct descendant clan. It is believed that Tadahisa, after becoming a retainer for the Seiwa Genji, adopted the Minamoto family name for political influence.

The Sō clan also claimed descent from the Koremune clan; however, like the Shimazu clan, it also self-proclaimed to be an offshoot clan of the Taira clan as well (through Taira no Tomomori). Similar to the Shimazu, modern historians consider the claim to be an aggrandization and believe the Sō clan to be only of Koremune descent.

== See also ==
- Hata clan
- Sō clan
- Shimazu clan
