= Sō Yoshitoshi =

Sō clan daimyō of Tsushima (1568–1615)

- 宗 義智
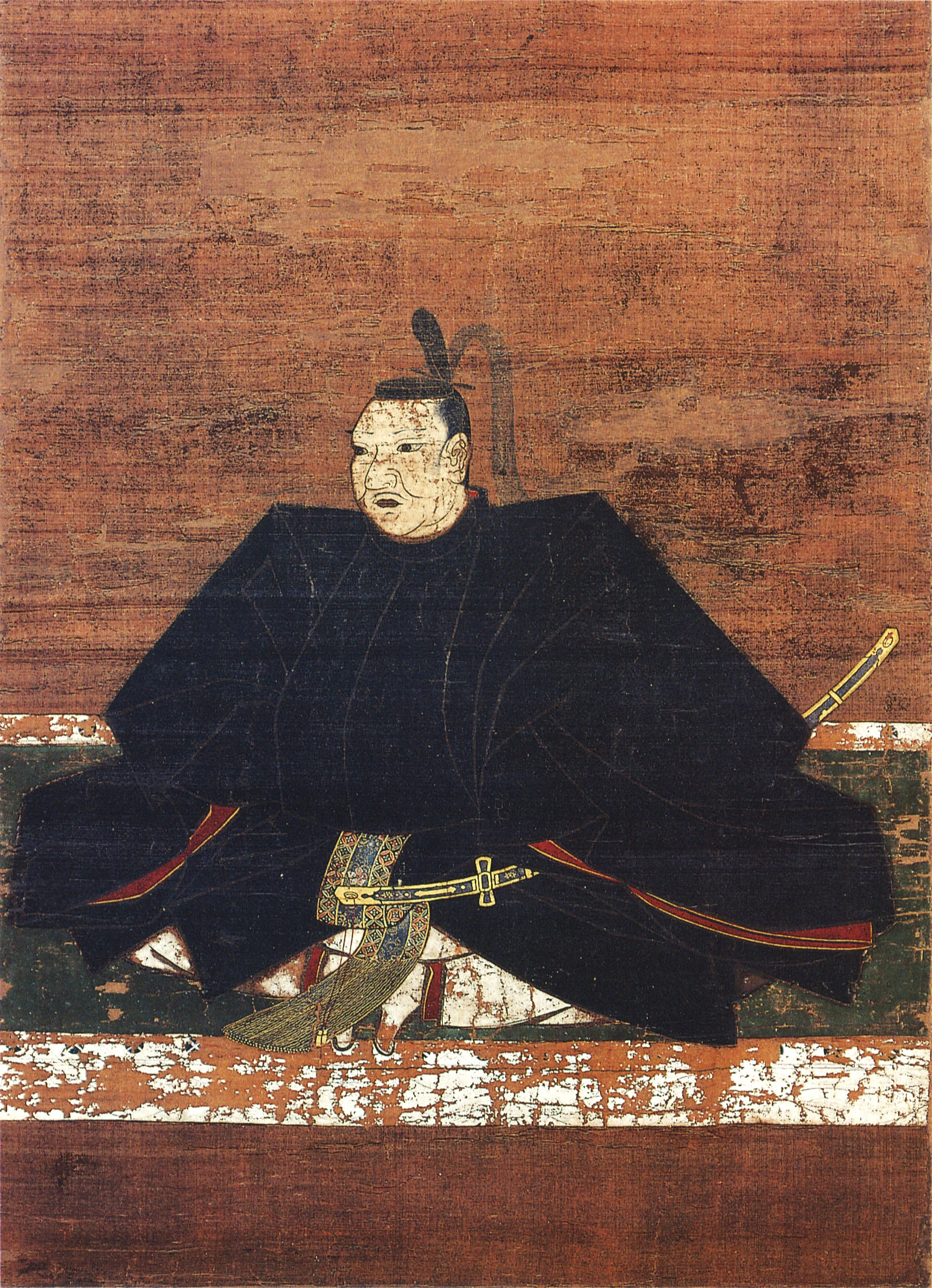

Daimyō of Tsushima
- In office 1588–1615
- Preceded by: Sō Yoshishige
- Succeeded by: Sō Yoshinari

Personal details
- Born: January 1, 1568 Japan
- Died: January 31, 1615 (aged 47) Tsushima, Japan
- Spouse: Konishi Maria

Military service
- Battles/wars: Imjin War

One mon of the Sō clan, derived from one belonging to the Taira clan

Sō Yoshitoshi (宗 義智; 1568 – 31 January 1615) was a Sō clan daimyō (feudal lord) of the domain of Tsushima on Tsushima Island at the end of Japan's Sengoku period, and into the Edo period. His name is sometimes read as Yoshitomo. Under the influence of Konishi Yukinaga, he was baptized and accepted the name "Dario". He took part in Toyotomi Hideyoshi's invasions of Korea in the 1590s, and led a force in the Siege of Busan.

The Sō clan did not participate in the Battle of Sekigahara in 1600. However, the tozama Sō clan were allowed to continue to rule Tsushima.

== Early life ==
Yoshitoshi was the fifth son of Sō Masamori. His wife, who took the baptismal name Maria, was the daughter of Konishi Yukinaga. Yoshitoshi became the head of the family in 1580, after his adoptive father, Sō Yoshishige, was defeated, and Tsushima conquered, in a prelude to Toyotomi Hideyoshi's Kyūshū Campaign.

In 1587, Toyotomi Hideyoshi confirmed the Sō clan's possession of Tsushima. Yoshitoshi thus entered Hideyoshi's service. Among the first major tasks he undertook on behalf of Hideyoshi was to organize negotiations with Korea as Hideyoshi's representative. Hideyoshi, to fulfill the ambitions of his deceased lord Oda Nobunaga, whose authority and domains he had assumed and expanded after Nobunaga's death, had the conquest of Ming China as his ultimate goal. (Practical reasons, such as the greatly expanded warrior class and the large number of armed forces it commanded immediately after Hideyoshi unified Japan, also played a larger role in Hideyoshi's reasoning. These forces posed a potential threat to Japan's internal stability and possibly to Hideyoshi's plans for dynastic succession.) Hideyoshi hoped to re-establish diplomatic relations with Joseon Korea and hoped to induce Korea to join his plans for a campaign against China. Therefore, Yoshitoshi was tasked in 1589 to deliver to Joseon Korea Hideyoshi's demand that Korea join/participate in Hideyoshi's planned campaign against China or face war with Japan.

Yoshitoshi's house, having special trading privileges with Korea (Tsushima at the time was the single checkpoint for all Japanese ships going to Korea), had a vested interest in preventing conflict between Korea and Japan, and Yoshitoshi delayed talks (he was assigned to Hideyoshi's second mission to Korea, after the first one in 1587 had failed ) for nearly two years. After Hideyoshi renewed his demands and pushed Yoshitoshi to deliver his message, Yoshitoshi, rather than delivering Hideyoshi's demands, instead reduced the visit to the Korean court to a campaign to better relations between the two countries, and was able to secure a Korean diplomatic mission to Japan, which arrived in 1590. The message the Korean envoys received from Hideyoshi, redrafted as requested because it was too discourteous, invited Korea to submit to Japan and join in a war against China.

As Joseon was a tributary state and ally of Ming China, King Seonjo refused the safe passage of Japanese troops through Korea to invade China. Hideyoshi then planned a military invasion of Korea as the first step to achieving his ultimate goal of conquering China. Yoshitoshi played a crucial role in the beginning of Hideyoshi's invasions of Korea due to his domain of Tsushima's strategic location between Korea and Japan, as well as his knowledge of and experience with Korea, Yoshitoshi was tasked to lead the first major land assault of the war (the Siege of Busan, April 13, 1592), supported by his father-in-law, the daimyo Konishi Yukinaga. Yoshitoshi continued his command through several engagements afterward. Ultimately the campaigns in Korea failed by 1598, but Yoshitoshi was able to return to his domains in Tsushima, where he would later receive word of the Battle of Sekigahara in 1600.

== After Sekigahara ==
Shortly after news of the Toyotomi defeat at the Battle of Sekigahara was received by the Joseon Court, a process of re-establishing diplomatic relations was initiated by Tokugawa Ieyasu in 1600. As an initial gesture and as an earnest of future progress, some Joseon prisoners were released at Tsushima Island. In response, a small group of messengers under the leadership of Yujeong were sent to Kyoto to investigate further. With the assistance of Sō Yoshitomo, an audience with Ieyasu was arranged at Fushimi Castle in Kyoto.

In 1603, Tokugawa Ieyasu established a new shogunate, and Sō Yoshitoshi was officially granted Fuchū Domain (100,000 koku) in Tsushima Province.

In 1604, Yujeong confirmed Joseon's interest in developing further contacts, and the Tokugawa shōgun reciprocated by releasing 1,390 prisoners of war.

In the continuation of the diplomatic talks toward peaceful relations, Joseon in 1606 expanded its conditions and demanded that the shogun write a formal letter requesting peace, and to extradite the Japanese soldiers who had defiled the Joseon Royal Tombs near Hanseong. Realizing that the Shogunate would never agree to such a request, Sō Yoshitoshi sent a forged letter and a group of criminals instead. The great need to expel the Ming soldiers pushed Joseon into accepting and sending an emissary in 1608. The result was a return of Joseon prisoners and the restoration of diplomatic and trade relations between the two countries.

Yoshitomo's descendants held this domain until the abolition of the han system. The Sō would remain the shogunate's intermediaries with the Joseon government throughout the Edo period (1603–1868), and the clan would profit politically and economically.

As representatives and spokesmen for the Tokugawa, the Sō helped ensure a continuing series of major Joseon missions to Edo (Joseon missions to the Tokugawa shogunate). These benefited the Japanese as legitimizing propaganda for the bakufu (Tokugawa shogunate) and as a key element in an emerging manifestation of Japan's ideal vision of the structure of an international order, with Edo as its center.

In 1884, the head of this clan line was ennobled as a "Count".

== See also ==
- Tsūkō ichiran, mid-19th century text
