= List of places of scenic beauty of Japan (Nagasaki) =

This list is of the places of scenic beauty of Japan located within the Prefecture of Nagasaki.

== National Places of Scenic Beauty ==
As of 1 August 2019, seven Places have been designated at a national level (including one *Special Place of Scenic Beauty).

Site	Municipality	Comments	Image	Coordinates	Type	Ref.
*Mount Unzen 温泉岳; Unzen-dake	Unzen/Shimabara/Minamishimabara			32°44′21″N 130°16′16″E	1, 3, 10	
Former Enyū-ji Gardens 旧円融寺庭園; Kyū-Enyūji teien	Ōmura			32°54′16″N 129°57′49″E	1	
Former Kaneishi Castle Gardens 旧金石城庭園; Kyū-Kaneishi-jō teien	Tsushima			34°12′15″N 129°17′07″E	1	
Ishida Castle Gotō Family Gardens 石田城五島氏庭園; Ishida-jō Gotō-shi teien	Gotō			32°41′36″N 128°50′42″E	1	
Seika-en and Umegayatsu Kairaku-en 棲霞園及び梅ヶ谷津偕楽園; Seika-en oyobi Umegayatsu Kairaku-en	Hirado			33°21′00″N 129°32′41″E	1	
Miiraku 三井楽（みみらくのしま） Miiraku (Mimiraku-no-shima)	Gotō			32°41′44″N 128°50′27″E	8	
Eight Views of Hirado 平戸領地方八竒勝 (平戸八景); Hirado ryōjikata hakkishō (Hirado hakkei)	Sasebo	designation comprises Taka-iwa (髙巌), Senryūsui (潜龍水), Ishi-bashi (石橋), Daihikan (大悲観) (pictured), Iwa-yagura (巌屋宮), Fukuishi-yama (福石山), and Shionome (潮之目) (the eighth monument is Megane-iwa (眼鏡岩))		33°13′08″N 129°37′29″E	5, 6	

== Prefectural Places of Scenic Beauty ==
As of 1 May 2019, one Place has been designated at a prefectural level.

Site	Municipality	Comments	Image	Coordinates	Type	Ref.
Taki no Kannon 滝の観音; Taki no Kannon	Nagasaki			32°48′01″N 129°56′13″E		

== Municipal Places of Scenic Beauty ==
As of 1 May 2019, seven Places have been designated at a municipal level.

Site	Municipality	Comments	Image	Coordinates	Type	Ref.
Iōjima Lighthouse Park 伊王島灯台公園; Iōjima tōdai kōen	Nagasaki	designed by Richard Henry Brunton and dating to 1871, the hexagonal lower part of the first Western-style iron lighthouse in Japan was rebuilt in reinforced concrete and with a square plan after damage in the atomic blast of 1945; the upper section is original, while the current octagonal plan of the lower section dates to 2003; the lighthouse operated unmanned after 1971		32°42′52″N 129°45′39″E		
Ajiro Ripple Marks 網代の漣痕; Ajiro no renkon	Tsushima			34°38′47″N 129°28′30″E		
Nishitsuya Ripple Marks 西津屋の漣痕; Nishitsuya no renkon	Tsushima			34°39′49″N 129°23′49″E		
Summit of Mount Konpira 金比羅山頂; Konpira-sanchō	Isahaya			32°49′23″N 130°05′39″E		
Kawashimo no Ushi no Hanaguri 川下の牛のはなぐり; Kawashimo no ushi no hanaguri	Isahaya			32°45′16″N 130°00′40″E		
Former Oda Family Gardens 旧小田家庭園 kyū-Oda-ke teien	Ojika			33°11′21″N 129°03′31″E		

== Registered Places of Scenic Beauty ==
As of 1 August 2019, three Monuments have been registered (as opposed to designated) as Places of Scenic Beauty at a national level.

Place	Municipality	Comments	Image	Coordinates	Type	Ref.
Former Itō Family Gardens (Shimeisō Gardens) 旧伊東氏庭園（四明荘庭園） kyū-Itō-shi teien (Shimeisō teien)	Shimabara			32°47′04″N 130°22′14″E		
Peace Park 平和公園; Heiwa kōen	Nagasaki			32°46′33″N 29°51′48″E		
Kobayakawa Family Gardens 小早川氏庭園; Kobayakawa-shi teien	Shimabara			32°47′36″N 130°21′56″E		

== See also ==
- Cultural Properties of Japan
- List of Historic Sites of Japan (Nagasaki)
- List of parks and gardens of Nagasaki Prefecture
