= Battle of Iki (1274) =

Battle during the First Mongol invasion of Japan

- Part of the First Mongol invasions of Japan
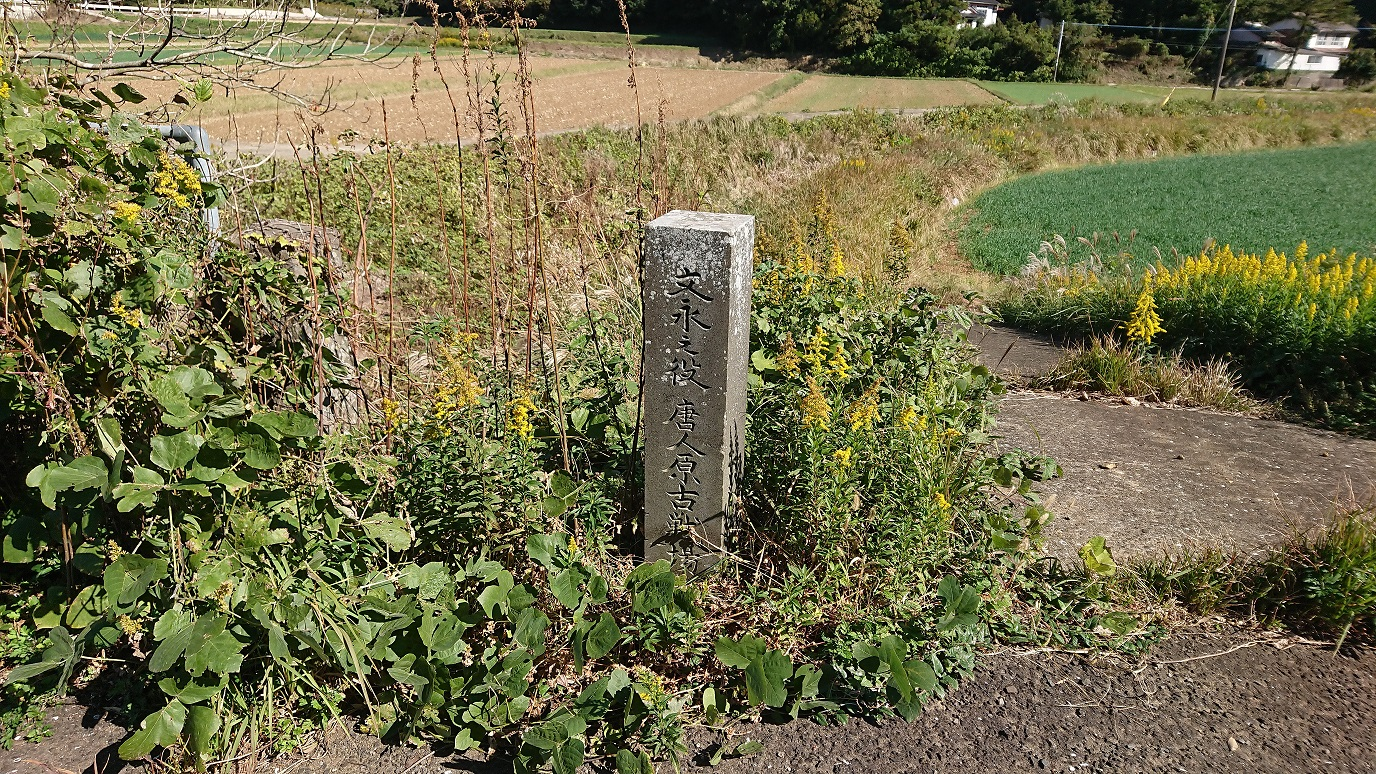
- Historical marker on Iki Island at the site of the Mongol landing and battle during the first Mongol invasion of 1274.
Date	13–14 November 1274 (Note: The date varies between sources, with some historical records giving 12 November 1274 instead.)
Location	Iki Island, Kamakura shogunate (modern Japan) 33°45′N 129°41′E
Result	Yuan victory
Territorial changes	Yuan army captures Iki Island

Belligerents
Yuan dynasty; Goryeo	Kamakura shogunate; Taira clan

Commanders and leaders
Unknown	Taira Kagetaka ‡‡

Strength
Part of the invasion force	100 samurai and local soldiers

Casualties and losses
Few	Heavy
- Location of the battle on a map of modern Japan Iki (Nagasaki Prefecture)

The Battle of Iki (1274) was an engagement during the Bun’ei Campaign, fought on 13–14 November 1274 during the First Mongol invasion of Japan. Following the fall of Tsushima, Yuan forces landed on Iki Island, where they faced Japanese defenders led by Taira Kagetaka. After fighting the Yuan forces, the defenders were defeated and the island fell to the Yuan army, allowing the Yuan forces to continue their advance towards Kyushu.

== Background ==
In 1274, Kublai Khan ordered ships to be made ready in Korean ports for an attack on Japan. Some estimates suggest that 900 ships were gathered to carry as many as 40,000 soldiers. Most of these soldiers were Mongols, with Korean and Chinese auxiliaries. It is unclear whether the attack was intended to conquer Japan or simply to assess its military strength.

Historian Stephen Turnbull suggests that the invasion may have been intended mainly as a reconnaissance mission. Tsushima Island was attacked first, lying between the Korean Peninsula and Kyushu. After defeating the small force at Tsushima, the Yuan army sailed south to Iki Island.

== Battle ==
The Mongols remained on Tsushima for a number of days and departed in the afternoon of 13 November 1274, sailing towards Iki Island. The defence of Iki was commanded by Taira Kagetaka, the deputy jitō of the island. The Mongol forces landed on the north of the island. Kagetaka received word of the Mongol attack on Tsushima while he was at Hinotsume Castle and requested reinforcements from Dazaifu. Kagetaka also moved the samurai families into the castle for safety, likely a wooden stockade fort with watchtowers and gates. The defenders on Iki offered less resistance to the Yuan forces than those on Tsushima.

Kagetaka prepared to defend the island but had only about 100 mounted samurai. He also armed the local population, mostly fishermen, who were not trained soldiers. They used simple weapons such as old spears, damaged blades, wooden poles and stones. The Mongols attacked the defenders on the beaches, driving back the Japanese back with arrows, accompanied by war drums and gongs. The samurai fought back, but by evening the Mongols withdrew to their ships to rest. Kagetaka ordered the surviving defenders to retreat into Hinotsume Castle where they waited for help from the mainland. By the next morning, the Mongols had surrounded the castle with a large army.

Realising the island was falling, Kagetaka sent one of his trusted samurai, Sozaburo, to escape to the coast with his daughter, Katsura, through a secret passage to the shore. The two got into a waiting boat and tried to sail past the Mongol fleet. As they passed the Mongol fleet, a volley of arrows killed Katsura. Although Sozaburo was wounded, he sailed on and reached Hakata. There, he reported that Iki’s defenders had been defeated and that the Mongols were coming.

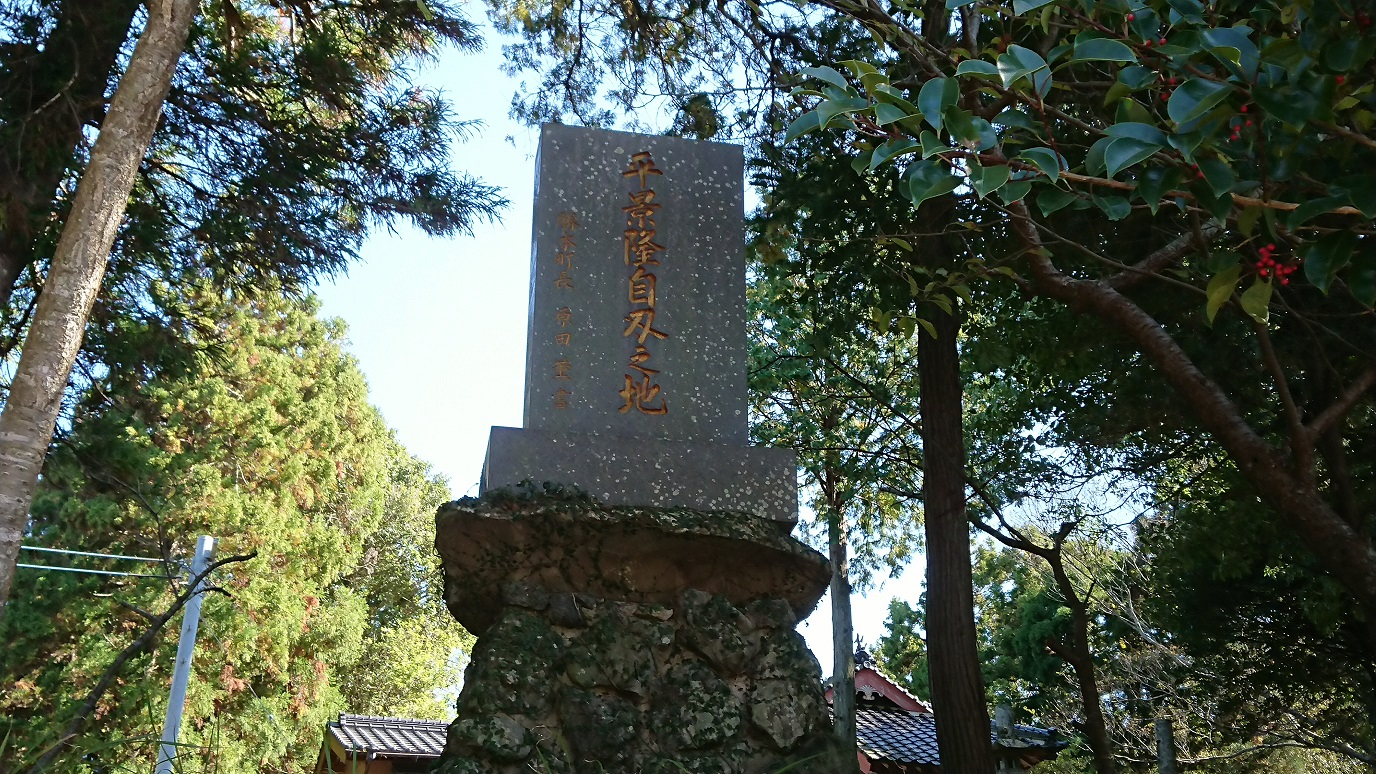
Monument commemorating Taira Kagetaka's final moments at Shinjo Shrine at Iki Island.

When one of the gates of Hinotsume Castle was broken and no reinforcements arrived, Kagetaka prepared a final attack. However, the Mongols used Japanese prisoners as human shields. The defenders then charged into the Mongol forces with swords but were overwhelmed. Kagetaka withdrew and committed suicide with his family.

A 1909 oil painting by Yada Issho depicting the ritual suicide of Taira Kagetaka and his clan.

Some captives were also tied along the front of Mongol ships, which continued their journey towards Kyushu. Japanese legends later described how the samurai's stubborn bravery angered the Mongols rather than earned their admiration.

== Aftermath ==
After capturing Iki, the Yuan soldiers killed local residents, burned and looted their homes, and mistreated prisoners. Japanese accounts also described women being captured and assaulted. Some female captives reportedly had holes pierced through their palms, with ropes passed through them before they were taken away. One account mentions that some prisoners had their hands pierced and were tied together in a line along the Mongol ships before the fleet sailed onward to Kyushu. Afterwards, the Yuan forces were able to continue their advance towards Kyushu.

== See also ==
- Mongol invasions of Japan
- Battle of Tsushima (1274)
- Battle of Bun'ei
