= Sō Yoshiyori =

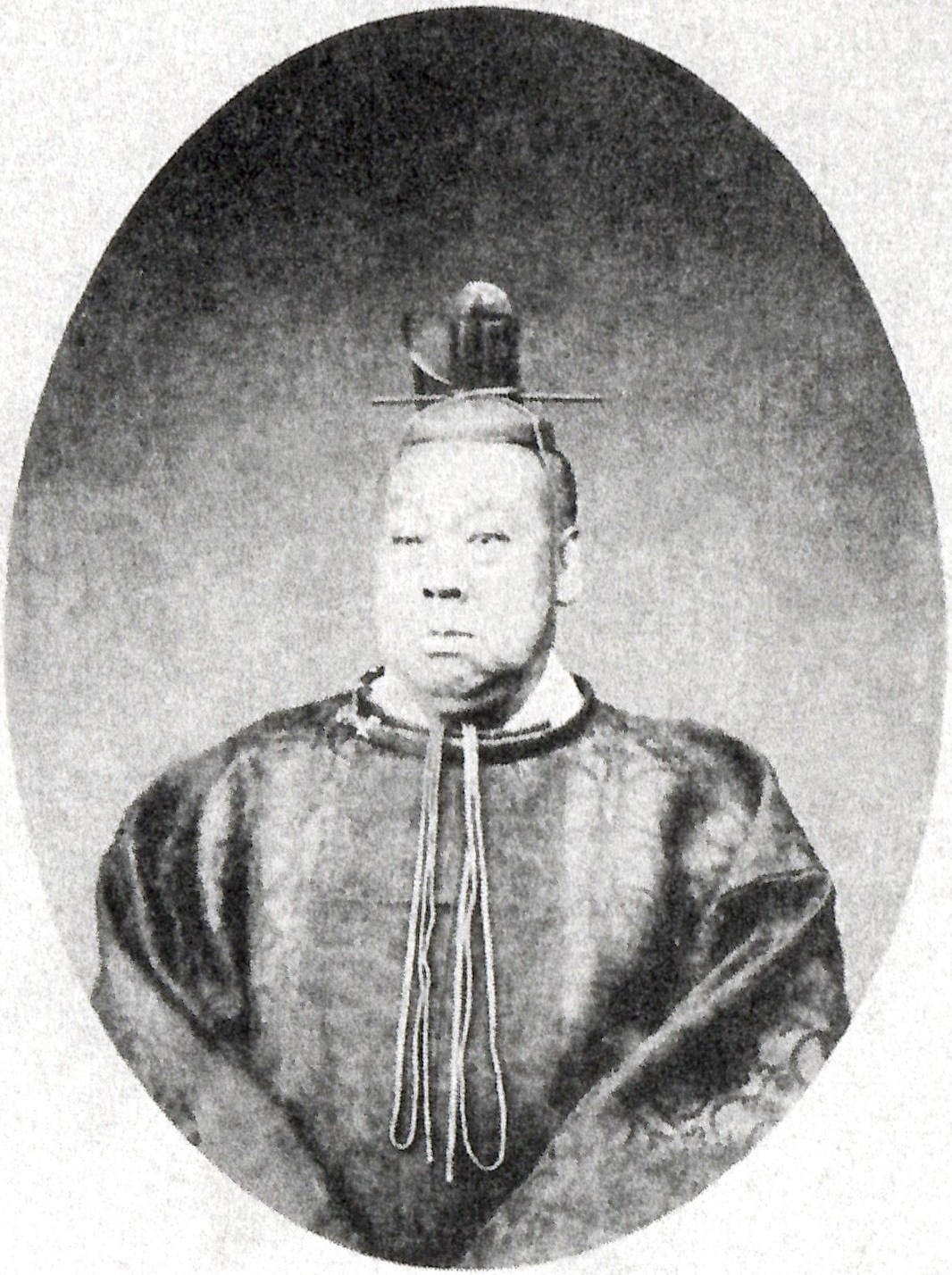
Sō Yoshiyori

One mon of the Sō clan, derived from one belonging to the Taira clan

Sō Yoshiyori (宗 義和; September 4, 1818 – August 13, 1890) was a Sō clan daimyō (feudal lord) of the island domain of Tsushima at the end of Japan's Edo period.

Yoshinori was the head of the Sō clan from 1842 through 1862.

== Black ships ==
Sō Tsushima-no-kami was a senior member of the Imperial Commission which was delegated the responsibility of meeting with Commodore Perry and his men on March 8, 1854. He sat next to Daigaku-no-kami Hayashi Akira in the conference meeting.

- March 8, 1854 (Kaei 7, 10th day of the 2nd month): Commodore Perry returned to Edo Bay to force Japanese agreement to the Treaty of Kanagawa; and the chief Japanese negotiator was Daigaku-no kami Hayashi Akira, who was known to the Americans as "Prince Commissioner Hayashi".

In the context of this unique negotiation with the Americans, Yoshinori's rank was considered secondary only to Hayashi. Perry construed his counterparts as an Imperial Commission consisting of five Commissioners with supporting staff and military support:

- Hayashi Daigaku-no-kami;
- Sō Yoshinori Tsushima-no-kami – Americanized as "Ido, Prince of Tsus-sima";
- Izawa Mimasaki-no-kami – Americanized as "Izawa, Prince of Mimasaki", named "governor" of the newly elevated "Imperial" city of Shimoda
- U-dono Minboi-shiogū – Americanized as "Udono, member of the Board of Revenue";
- "Matsusaki Michitaro".

== See also ==
- Tsūkō ichiran, mid-19th century text
