= Sō Sukekuni =

Japanese Warrior and Ruler of Tsushima

- 宗 助国
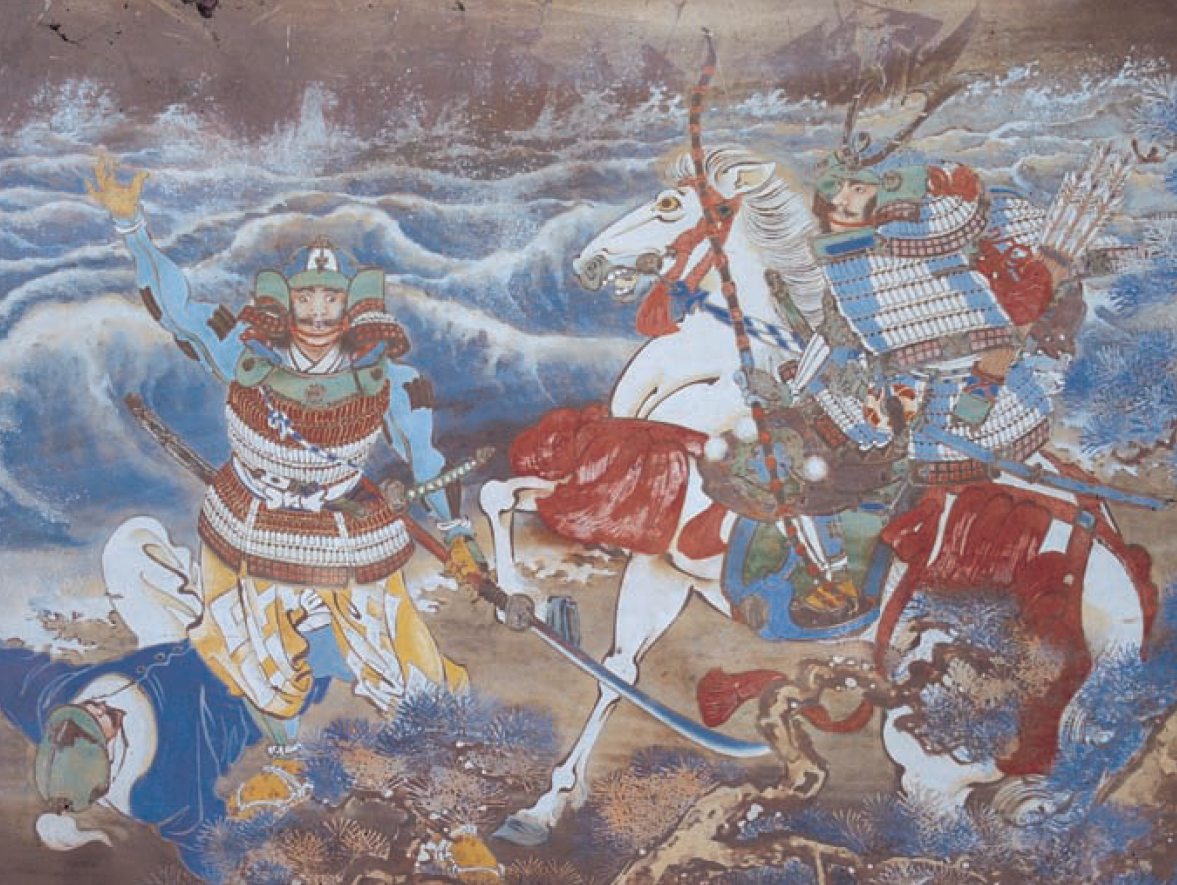
- Possibly Sō Sukekuni (right)

Personal details
- Born: 1207
- Died: November 4, 1274 (aged 66–67) Tsushima
- Occupation: Deputy Governor of Tsushima Province
- Known for: Defending Tsushima against the Mongols

Sō Sukekuni (宗 助国; 1207 - November 4, 1274) was the Deputy Governor of Tsushima Province during the Kamakura period of Japan. During the first Mongol invasion of Japan in 1274, Sukekuni led the defence of the island despite only having 80 men. He was killed during the battle on November 4, 1274. He was the head of the Sō clan, who were the historical rulers of the Tsushima Island.

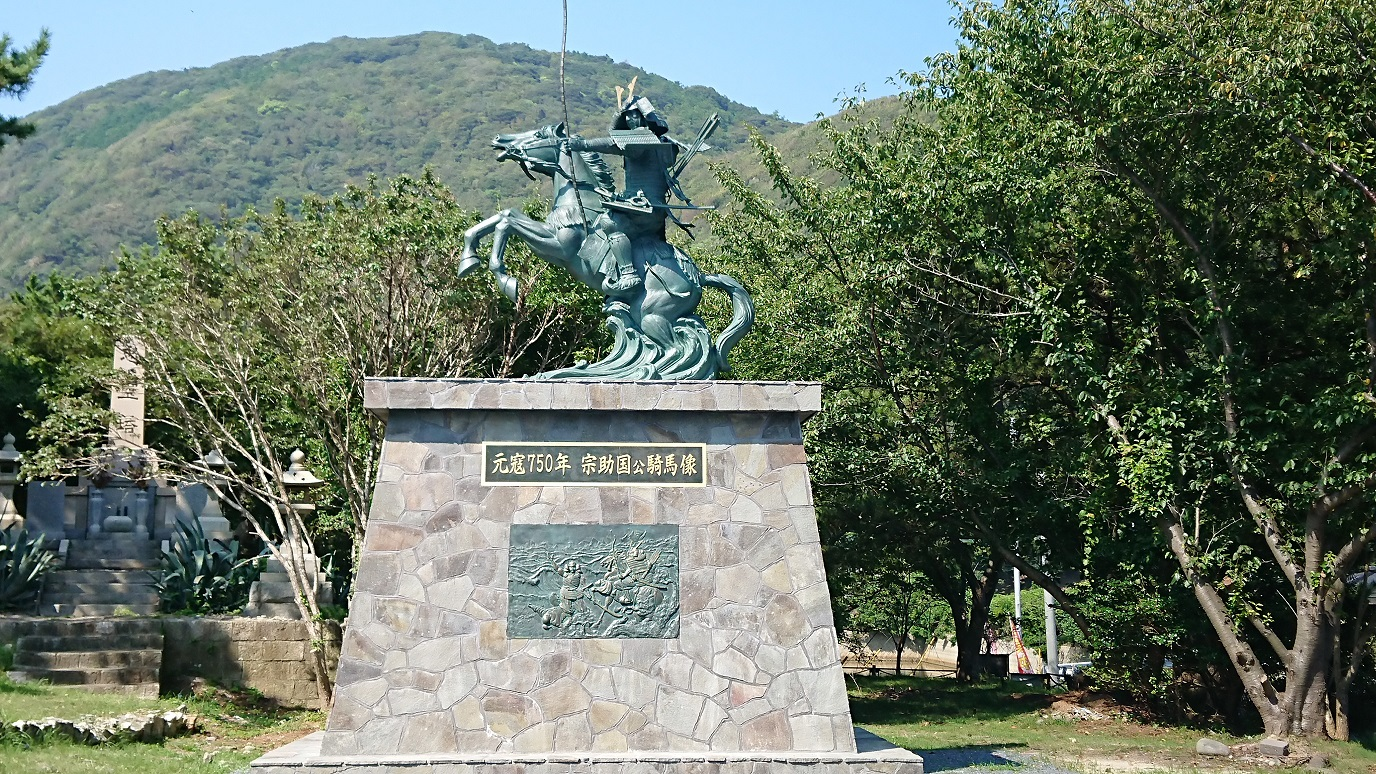
750th Anniversary Statue of Soh Sukekuni in Komodahama, Tsushima

== Life ==
Sukekuni was born as a member of the Sō clan, and later became the head of the clan.

During the Invasion of Tsushima by Mongols in 1274, as the deputy governor (jitodai) of Tsushima Province, Sukekuni had to organize a hasty defence after the fleet was spotted offshore. On that day, the shrine to Hachiman caught on fire, which would have been an omen of bad luck, but Sukekuni interpreted it as an omen of warning.

With 80 mounted samurai and their retinue, Sukekuni confronted an invasion force of what the Sō Shi Kafu describes as 8,000 warriors embarked on 900 ships. The Mongols landed at 02:00 in the morning on November 4, and ignored the Japanese negotiation attempts, opening fire with their archers and forcing them to retreat. Sukekuni died in battle defending his home island.

== Sources ==
- Turnbull, Stephen (2010). The Mongol Invasions of Japan 1274 and 1281. Osprey.
