= Tsushima Province =

Former province of Japan

Tsushima Province 対馬国
- Province of Japan
- 7th century–1871
- Map of Japanese provinces (1868) with Tsushima Province highlighted
- Capital: Shimoagata District
- History
  - Established: 7th century
  - Disestablished: 1871
| Preceded by | Succeeded by |
| Shimoagata kuni no miyatsuko; Kamiagata kuni no miyatsuko | Izuhara Prefecture |
- Today part of: Tsushima, Nagasaki

Tsushima Province (対馬国, Tsushima no Kuni; Japanese pronunciation: [t͡sɨ̥.ɕì.mä̀ (nò̞ kɯ̈̀.ɲ̟ì), -ɕí-]) was an old province of Japan on Tsushima Island which occupied the area corresponding to modern-day Tsushima, Nagasaki. It was sometimes called Taishū (対州) .

== Political history ==
The origin of Tsushima Province is unclear.

It is often identified as the country Tsukaikoku (對海国) mentioned in the Wajinden.

It is possible that Tsushima was recognized as a province of the Yamato Court in the 5th century. Under the Ritsuryō system, Tsushima formally became a province.

Tsushima Province has been a strategic area that took a major role in the national defense against possible invasions from the continent and in trade with Korea. After Japan was defeated by Tang dynasty at the Battle of Baekgang in 663, Kaneda Castle was constructed on this island.

Tsushima Province had been controlled by the Tsushima no Kuni no miyatsuko until the Heian period. This clan was later replaced by the Abiru clan. The Sō clan rose to power around the middle 13th century and seized control of the entire island in the late 15th century. During the Edo period, Tsushima Province was dominated by the Tsushima-Fuchū Domain (Izuhara domain) of the So clan. It was put in charge of diplomacy and monopolized trade with the Joseon dynasty of Korea.

As a result of the abolition of the han system, the Tsushima Fuchu domain became Izuhara Prefecture in 1871. In the same year, Izuhara Prefecture was merged into Imari Prefecture, which was renamed Saga Prefecture in 1872. Tsushima was transferred to Nagasaki Prefecture in 1872. At the same time, the province continued to exist for some purposes. For example, Tsushima is explicitly recognized in treaties in 1894 (a) between Japan and the United States and (b) between Japan and the United Kingdom.

== Historical districts ==
Throughout history, Tsushima Province consisted of two districts:

- Nagasaki Prefecture
  - Kamiagata District (上県郡)
  - Shimoagata District (下県郡)

The capital of Tsushima Province was located at Izuhara. In the modern local municipality system, they were divided into Kamiagata and Shimoagata Districts respectively, and were subsequently merged into the city of Tsushima today.

== See also ==
- Tsushima-Fuchū Domain
