= Tsushima-Fuchū Domain =

Domain of Edo-period Japan

Tsushima-Fuchū Domain (1588–1869) 対馬府中藩 Izuhara Domain (1869–1871) 厳原藩
- Domain of Japan
- 1588–1871
- Mon of the Sō

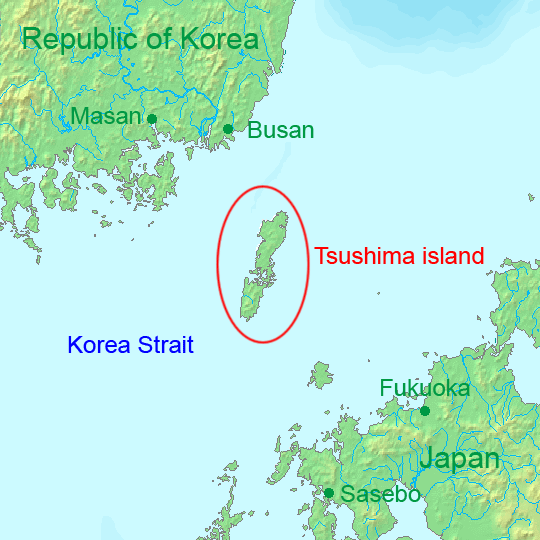
- Location of Tsushima island
- Capital: Kaneishi Castle (1588–1687); Sajikihara Castle (1687–1871)
- Government
  - Type: Daimyō
- Daimyō
  - 1588-1615: Sō Yoshitoshi (first)
  - 1862-1871: Sō Yoshiakira (last)
- Historical era: Edo period
  - Established: 1588
  - Abolition of the han system: 1871
Preceded by	Succeeded by
Tsushima Province	Izuhara Prefecture
- Today part of: Nagasaki Prefecture; Saga Prefecture

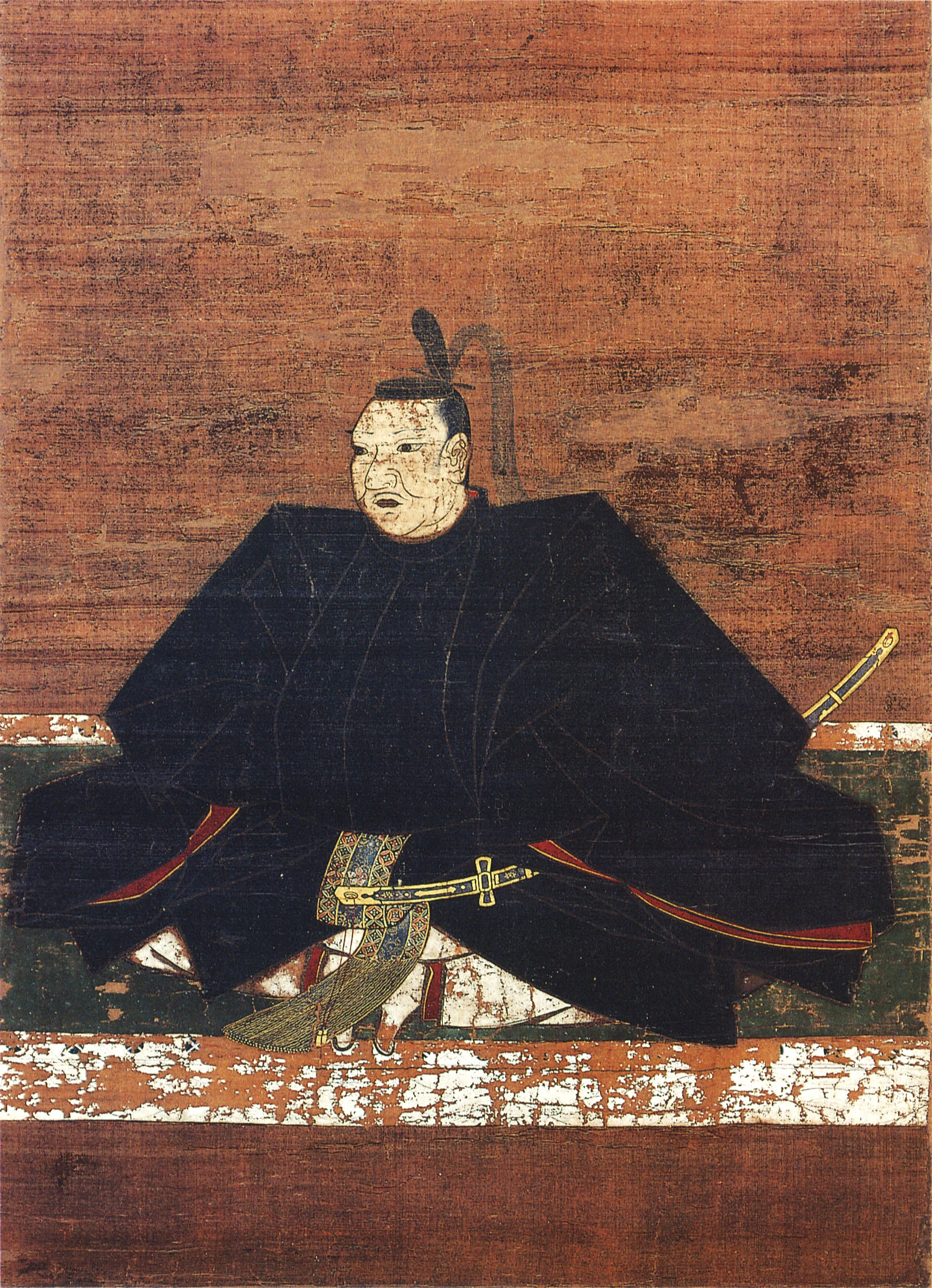
Sō Yoshitoshi, founder of Tsushima-Fuchū Domain

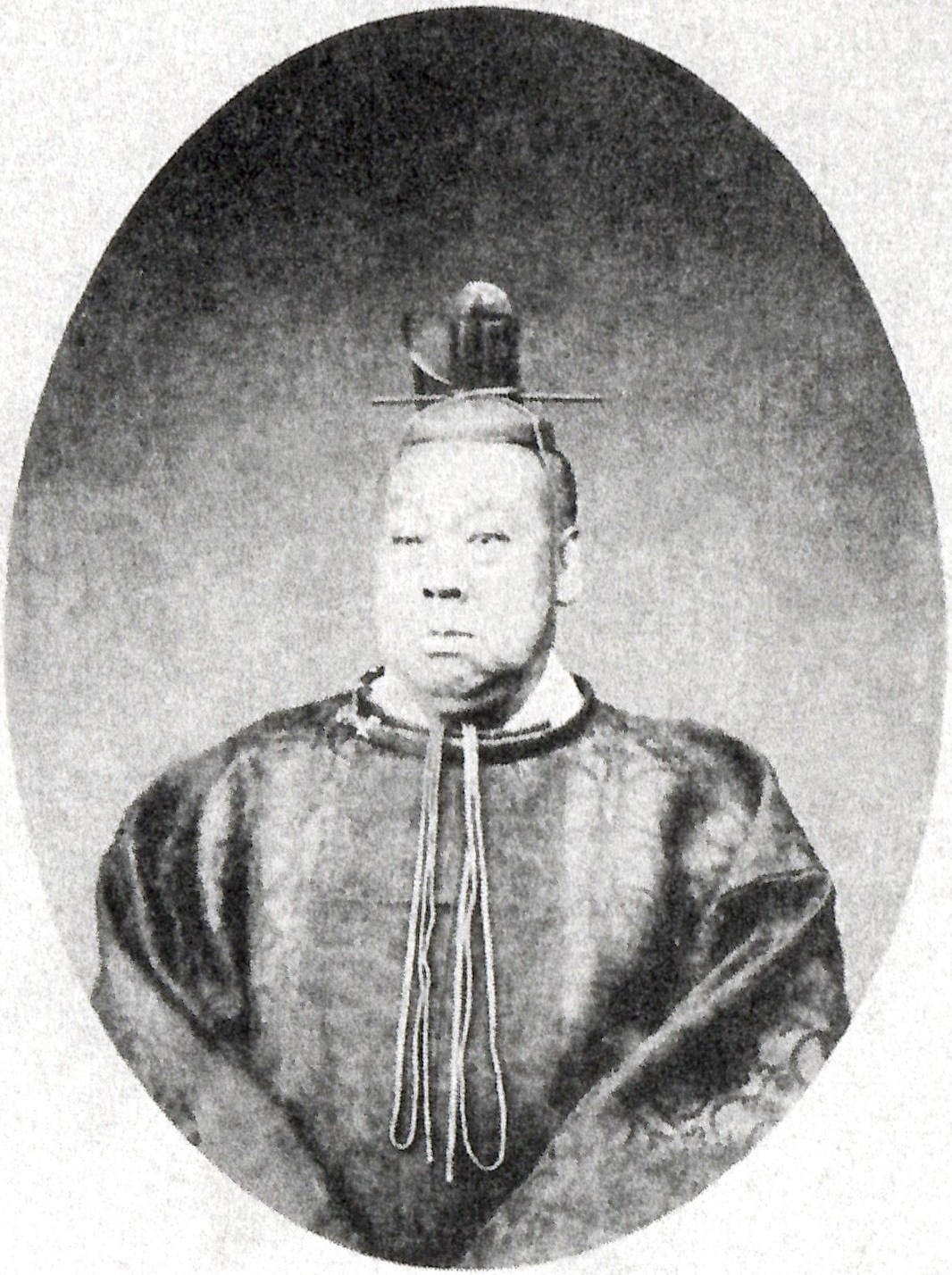
Sō Yoshiyori, the 15th next to last daimyo of Tsushima-Fuchū Domain

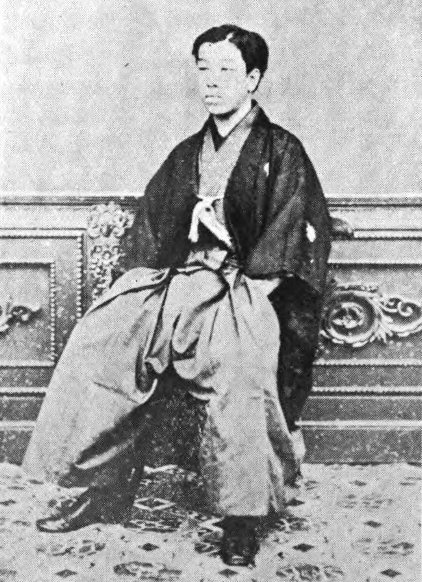
Sō Yoshiaki, final daimyo of Tsushima-Fuchū Domain

Tsushima Fuchū Domain (対馬府中藩, Tsushima Fuchū han), also called the Tsushima Domain, was a domain of Japan in the Edo period. It is associated with Tsushima Province on Tsushima Island in modern-day Nagasaki Prefecture.

In the han system, Tsushima was a political and economic abstraction based on periodic cadastral surveys and projected agricultural yields. In other words, the domain was defined in terms of kokudaka, not land area. This was different from the feudalism of the West.

== History ==
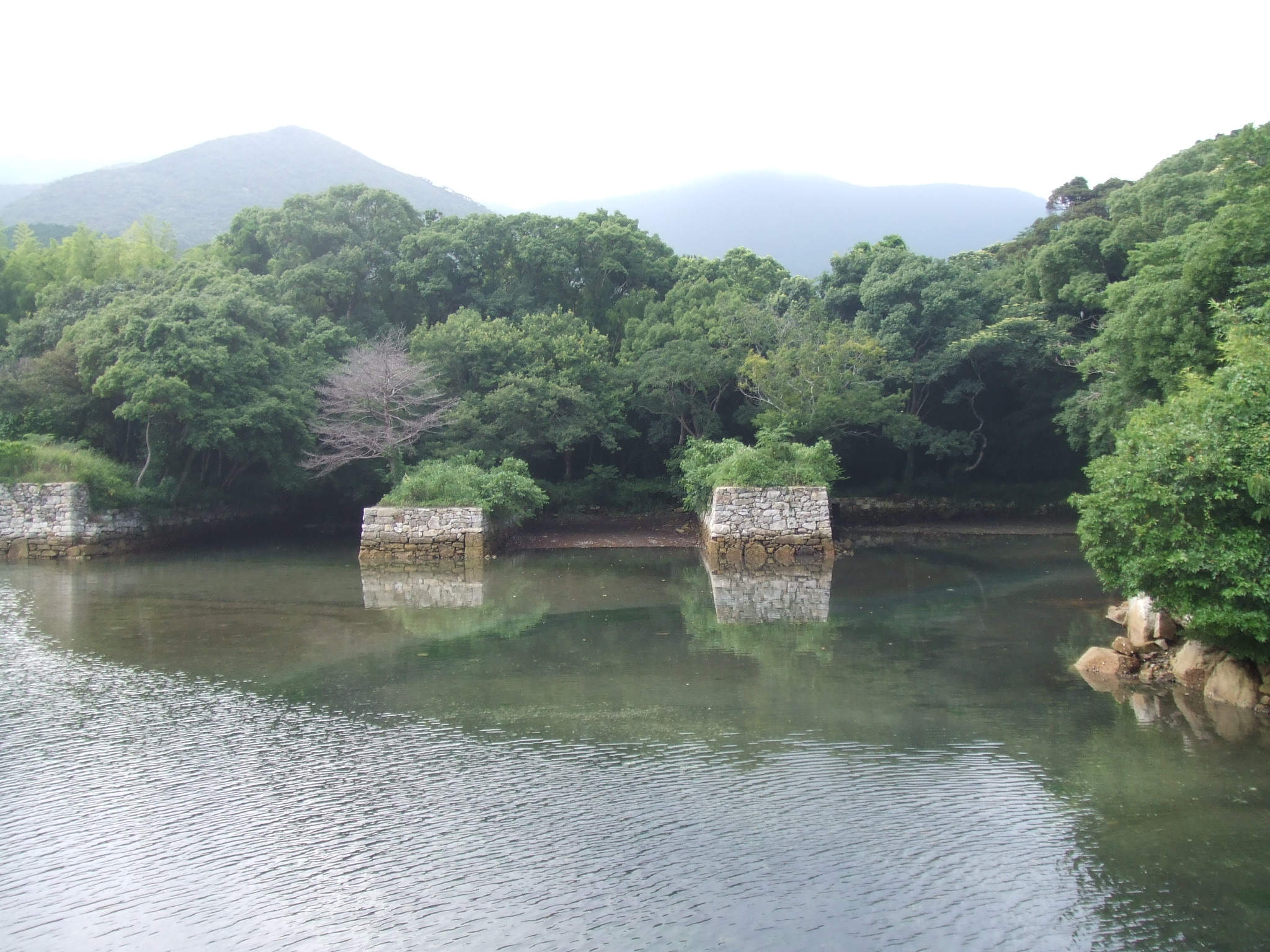
Tsushima domain shipyard site ruins. Built in 1663 CE.

The Sō clan was one of few daimyō clans during the Edo period which continued to control the same fiefs it controlled previously. Although it fought against Tokugawa Ieyasu at the battle of Sekigahara, the Sō clan was allowed by the shogunate to continue to rule Tsushima and entrusted it to diplomatic negotiations and trade with Joseon Korea. Its services included receptions of Korean missions to Japan. The Fuchū domain sold imports and bought exports in Osaka and Kyoto. It negotiated trade and diplomacy with the Nagasaki Commissioner in Nagasaki. It had an office (waegwan) in Busan where daily trade and diplomatic service were conducted.

The Fuchū domain was given the status of a 100,000 koku-class han although its real production was below 30,000 koku, on account of its important diplomatic status, and economic wealth as a result of trade with Korea. In the late 17th century, it prospered in Korean trade and with silver mines, but from the 18th century, it suffered from trade depression and depletion of silver ores. Its economic reforms and the shogunate's constant aid did not improve its finances. Increasing threats of Western imperial powers weighed heavily on the Fuchū domain. In 1861, a Russian naval ship occupied a port of Tsushima. What was worse for Tsushima was a growing internal conflict between pro- and anti-shogunate retainers. In 1862, it concluded an alliance with the Chōshū Domain, which was one of the prominent leaders of the Sonnō-jōi movement. But the anti-shogunate faction was purged in 1864. The loss of human resources prevented Tsushima from playing a significant role at the Meiji Restoration.

The last daimyō of Tsushima, Sō Shigemasa (Yoshiaki) became Governor of Izuhara Prefecture in 1869 and after the Abolition of the han system was given the title of Count (hakushaku) in 1884. The diplomatic service with Korea was taken over by the new Ministry of Foreign Affairs.

== Holdings at the end of the Edo period ==
  - Tsushima Province
  - Kamigata-gun – 44 villages
  - Shimogata-gun – 63 villages, Izuhara-cho
  - Shimotsuke Province
  - Tsuga County – 5 villages
  - Aso counties – 6 villages
  - Chikuzen Province
  - Ito County – 14 villages
  - Buzen Province
  - Usa County – 8 villages
  - Shimomo County – 21 villages
  - Hizenkoku Province
  - Kiji-gun – 13 villages
  - Yabu County – 5 villages
  - Matsuura County – 49 villages

== List of daimyōs ==
The hereditary daimyōs were head of the Sō clan and head of the domain.

#	Name	Tenure	Courtesy title	Court Rank	kokudaka
Sō clan, 1588–1871 (Tozama daimyo)
1	Sō Yoshitoshi (宗義智)	1588–1615	Tsushima no kami (対馬の神)	Junior 5th Rank, Lower Grade (従五位下)	100,000 koku
2	Sō Yoshinari (宗義成)	1615–1657	Tsushima no kami (対馬の神)	Junior 5th Rank, Lower Grade (従五位下)	100,000 koku
3	Sō Yoshizane (宗義真)	1657–1692	Tsushima no kami, Gyobu Daisuke (津島 の 髪、 魚部 大輔)	Junior 5th Rank, Lower Grade (従五位下)	100,000 koku
4	Sō Yoshitsugu (Yoshitomo) (宗義倫)	1692–1694	Tsushima no kami, Ukyo no daibu (津島 の 髪、 う居 の だいぶ)	Junior 5th Rank, Lower Grade (従五位下)	100,000 koku
5	Sō Yoshimichi (宗義方)	1694–1718	Tsushima no kami (対馬の神)	Junior 5th Rank, Lower Grade (従五位下)	100,000 koku
6	Sō Yoshinobu (宗義誠)	1718–1730	Tsushima no kami (対馬の神)	Junior 5th Rank, Lower Grade (従五位下)	100,000 koku
7	Sō Michihiro (宗方熈)	1731–1732	Tsushima no kami, Minbu Daisuke (津島 の 髪、 民部 大輔)	Junior 5th Rank, Lower Grade (従五位下)	100,000 koku
8	Sō Yoshiaki (宗義如)	1732–1752	Tsushima no kami, Gyobu Daisuke (津島 の 髪、 魚部 大輔)	Junior 5th Rank, Lower Grade (従五位下)	100,000 koku
9	Sō Yoshishige (Yoshiari) (宗義蕃)	1752–1762	Tsushima no kami (対馬の神)	Junior 5th Rank, Lower Grade (従五位下)	100,000 koku
10	Sō Yoshinaga (宗義暢)	1762–1778	Tsushima no kami (対馬の神)	Junior 5th Rank, Lower Grade (従五位下)	100,000 koku
11	Sō Yoshikatsu (宗義功(兄)	1778–1785	None (全然)	Junior 5th Rank, Lower Grade (従五位下)	100,000 koku
12	Sō Yoshikatsu (宗義功(弟)	1785–1812	Tsushima no kami, Shikibu Daisuke (対馬の髪、式部大輔)	Junior 5th Rank, Lower Grade (従五位下)	100,000 koku
13	Sō Yoshikata (宗義質)	1812–1838	Tsushima no kami, Sakone no shosho (対馬守、左近衛少将)	Junior 5th Rank, Lower Grade (従五位下)	100,000 koku
14	Sō Yoshiaya (宗義章)	1838–1842	Tsushima no kami (対馬の神)	Junior 5th Rank, Lower Grade (従五位下)	100,000 koku
15	Sō Yoshiyori (宗義和)	1842–1862	Tsushima no kami, Harima no kami (対馬守、播磨守)	Junior 4th Rank, Lower Grade (従五位下)	100,000 koku
16	Sō Yoshiaki (Yoshiakira), later renamed Shigemasa (宗義達)	1862–1871	Tsushima no kami, Harima no kami (対馬守、播磨守)	Junior 4th Rank, Upper Grade (従五位下)	100,000 koku

=== Genealogy (simplified) ===
- I. Sō Yoshitoshi, 1st Lord of Tsushima-Fuchū (cr. 1588) (1568–1615; r. 1588–1615)
  - II. Yoshinari, 2nd Lord of Tsushima-Fuchū (1604–1657; r. 1615–1657)
    - III. Yoshizane, 3rd Lord of Tsushima-Fuchū (1639-1702; r. 1657–1692)
      - IV. Yoshitsugu, 4th Lord of Tsushima-Fuchū (1671–1694; r. 1692–1694)
      - V. Yoshimichi, 5th Lord of Tsushima-Fuchū (1684–1718; r. 1694–1718)
      - VI. Yoshinobu, 6th Lord of Tsushima-Fuchū (1692–1730; r. 1718–1730)
        - VIII. Yoshiaki, 8th Lord of Tsushima-Fuchū (1716–1752; r. 1732–1752)
          - X. Yoshinaga, 10th Lord of Tsushima-Fuchū (1741–1778; r. 1762–1778)
            - XI. Yoshikatsu I, 11th Lord of Tsushima-Fuchū (1771–1785; r. 1778–1785)
            - XII. Yoshikatsu II (Isaburō), 12th Lord of Tsushima-Fuchū (1773–1813; r. 1785–1812)
              - XIII. Yoshikata, 13th Lord of Tsushima-Fuchū (1800–1838; r. 1812–1838)
                - XIV. Yoshiaya, 14th Lord of Tsushima-Fuchū (1818–1842; r. 1838–1842)
                - XV. Yoshiyori, 15th Lord of Tsushima-Fuchū (1818–1890; r. 1842–1862; 34th family head: 1862–1890)
                  - XVI. Yoshiakira (Shigemasa), 16th Lord of Tsushima-Fuchū, 1st Count (1847–1902; Lord: 1862–1868; Governor: 1869–1871; 35th family head: 1890–1902; Count: 1884)
                    - Shigemochi, 2nd Count, 36th family head (1867–1923; 36th family head and 2nd Count: 1902–1923)
                  - Kuroda Kazushi, 1st Viscount (1851–1917; adopted into the Kuroda family; Viscount: 1884)
                    - Takeyuki, 3rd Count, 37th family head (1908–1985; 37th family head and 3rd Count: 1923–1947; 37th family head: 1947–1985)
                      - Tatsuhito, 38th family head (b. 1956; 38th family head: 1985–present)
        - IX. Yoshishige, 9th Lord of Tsushima-Fuchū (1717–1775; r. 1752–1762)
      - VII. Michihiro, 7th Lord of Tsushima-Fuchū (1696–1760; r. 1731–1732)

== See also ==
- Abolition of the han system
- List of han
