= Abiru clan =

Japanese clan

The Abiru clan (阿比留氏, Abiru-shi) was a Japanese clan which served the Kamakura shogunate as local officials on Tsushima. It is believed the clan may have been derived from the Soga clan, but the validity of this notion is not fully evident from primary sources.

In 1246, the Abiru rose up against their superiors, the Dazaifu authorities, headed by the Chinzei Bugyō, which oversaw the governance of Kyūshū for the shogunate. Koremune Shigehisa, at the request of Dazaifu, put down the rebellion and put an end to the Abiru clan.
