= Sō clan =

Japanese samurai clan

Sō 宗
- The emblem (mon) of the Sō clan
- Home province: Tsushima Province
- Parent house: Taira clan (self-proclaimed); Koremune clan
- Founder: Taira no Tomomune
- Founding year: 11th century
- Ruled until: 1871

Sō clan (宗氏, Sō-shi) was a Japanese clan claiming descent from Taira no Tomomori. The clan governed and held Tsushima Island from the 13th through the late 19th century, from the Kamakura period until the end of the Edo period and the Meiji Restoration.

In 1587, Toyotomi Hideyoshi confirmed the clan's possession of Tsushima. In the struggles which followed Hideyoshi's death, the clan sided with the Tokugawa; however, they did not participate in the decisive battles which preceded the establishment of the Tokugawa shogunate. The descendants of tozama Sō Yoshitoshi (1568–1615) remained at Tsushima-Fuchū Domain (100,000 koku) in Tsushima Province until the abolition of the han system. The head of this clan line was ennobled as count in 1884.

== History ==
Historians consider the Sō clan to have been an offshoot of the Koremune clan, who served as local officials of Dazaifu and Tsushima Province. The earliest evidence of Sō clan cohesion arises in the 11th century. The Koremune had their start as governors of Tsushima following an incident in 1246, when the Abiru clan, local district officials (zaichōkanjin) on Tsushima, rebelled against the Chinzei Bugyō and the Dazaifu government that governed all of Kyūshū and the surrounding regions on behalf of the Kamakura shogunate. Dazaifu ordered Koremune Shigehisa to stop the rebellion and to destroy the Abiru clan. The Shōni clan, the shugo 'governors' of Tsushima, rewarded him for his victory with the post of jitō 'local land steward'.

The Koremune extended its influence on Tsushima over the course of the Kamakura period, as the deputies of the Shōni. When the Mongols invaded Japan in 1274, clan head Sō Sukekuni fought against the invaders and died on Tsushima. The Sō clan fought for the Shōni clan and for the Ashikaga's Northern Court during the Nanboku-chō period (1336–1392), and seized a portion of Chikuzen Province. Imagawa Ryōshun became Chinzei Tandai (head of the Dazaifu government) soon afterwards, and the Imagawa clan became shugo of Tsushima. When Imagawa Ryōshun was dismissed from his post in 1395, Sō Sumishige became shugo of Tsushima.

Though now holding the hereditary post of shugo of Tsushima, the clan remained vassals of the Shōni until the late 15th century. In the course of breaking away from the Shōni clan, the Sō clan started to claim that it originated with a grandson of Taira no Tomomori, Taira no Tomomune. The Sō clan moved its base from northern Kyushu to Tsushima around 1408. Although it struggled to keep its territory in Chikuzen on Kyushu, the clan was finally purged from that region by the Ōuchi clan in the mid-15th century.

Alongside the Shōni clan, whose hereditary clan heads now regularly operated under Sō clan guidance, the Sō fought the Ōuchi numerous times across the Sengoku period (1467–1600), and later the Mōri and Ōtomo clans as well; the clan lost and regained their territory in Chikuzen province on Kyushu many times over the course of the period. In the end, the downfall of the Shōni, marked by Shōni Fuyuhisa's 1559 defeat at the hands of Ryūzōji Takanobu, brought an end to the Sō clan's territorial aspirations on Kyushu.

Following a period of increased wokou predation, the Joseon-Japanese "Treaty of Tenbun" in 1547 (Tenbun year 11) limited trading to the Joseon port of Busan and also limited Sō clan commerce to 20 ships annually.

The Sō clan submitted to Toyotomi Hideyoshi in 1587 and supplied troops for the invasions of Korea during the Imjin War. The Sō sided with the Western Army of Ishida Mitsunari at the Battle of Sekigahara (1600), yet they were not punished by Tokugawa Ieyasu. The prevalent theory is that Ieyasu sought to improve relations with Korea and China, and therefore pardoned the Sō clan, which had a diplomatic channel with Korea.

The tozama Sō clan were allowed to continue to rule Tsushima. Tsushima and the area around Tashiro in Hizen Province were included in the clan's fief (han), rated as worth 100,000 koku for its diplomatic and economic importance, though its agricultural production was actually under 30,000 koku per year. After the clan resumed diplomatic relations with Korea, the Tokugawa shogunate entrusted it with conducting diplomatic negotiations and trade with Joseon.

After the abolition of the han system in 1871, the last known head of the clan, Sō Shigemasa (Yoshiaki), was made Governor of Izuhara Prefecture, the renamed Tsushima Province.

== Influence ==
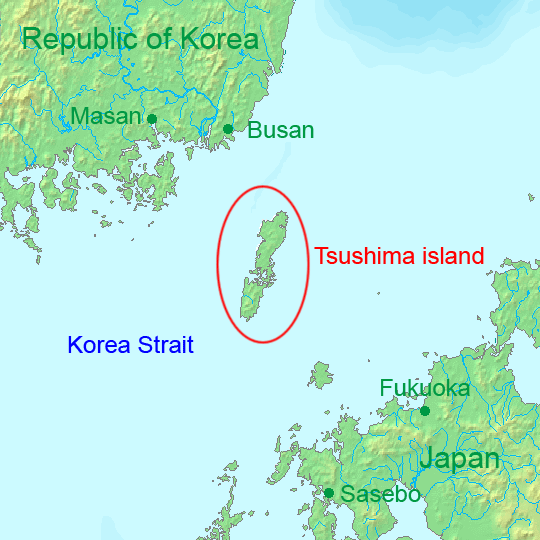
The Tsushima Island of the Sō clan acted as the intermediary of Korea and Japan throughout history due to its favorable location between the peninsula and the archipelago.

From roughly the 1430s to the 1550s, the clan worked towards independence, its sights set on gaining true control of Tsushima, and on establishing friendly relations with Joseon dynasty, Korea. The first of these goals was attained through a reversal of fate in which the Shōni came to rely upon the Sō for military aid against the Ōuchi. Sō Sadamori and his younger brother Sō Morikuni helped to defeat the Ōuchi over ten times, and in doing so deepened their clan's relationship with the traders and merchants of Hakata, one of Kyushu's major ports. However, with the ultimate defeat of the Sō clan by the Ōuchi clan, the latter became the dominant trading partner with Korea, often emphasizing on their shared heritage (Ōuchi claimed descent of a Paekche prince). Though not to the same extent, the Sō family maintained an amicable relationship with Korea too despite the lack of a favorable framework like the Ōuchi, even though they themselves were also of Korean descent (through its parent clan, the Koremune clan and its own parent clan, the Hata clan which originates in Silla).

Being based on the mountainous island, the Sō clan heavily relied on trade with Korea. Fortunately, the Sō clan shared mutual interests with the Joseon Dynasty. In 1443, the Daimyō of Tsushima, Sō Sadamori proposed the Gyehae treaty. The number of trade ships from Tsushima to Korea was decided by this treaty, and the Sō clan monopolized the trade with Korea. The Sō were required to greatly reduce the number of pirate attacks on Korea, and in return would be granted a virtual monopoly on Japanese trade with their neighbors on the peninsula. This would later lead to the emergence of the Sō as one of the major clans in Japan, their wealth and power from trade more than making up for their small territory and submissive position vis-a-vis Korea.

The clan participated in the Japanese invasion of Korea. However soon afterwards, the clan took it upon themselves to repair relations with Korea, sending a number of envoys under the guise of being official shogunal envoys. In doing this, the clan sought to improve their position with both the shogunate and Korea. There is evidence that they embellished official documents to make themselves look better to the other.

== Clan lords ==
1. Sō Shigehisa (重尚)(1245–1262) - fought against the Abiru/Ahiru clan (阿比留在庁) and became Governor of Tsushima
2. Sō Sukekuni (助國) (1262–1274) - fought Mongolian invasion force and died in 1274
3. Sō Moriakira (盛明) (1274–1302)
4. Sō Morikuni (盛國) (1302–1349)
5. Sō Tsuneshige(經茂) (1349–1366)
6. Sō Sumishige (澄茂) (1366–1370)
7. Sō Yorishige (頼茂) (1370–1402)
8. Sō Sadashige (貞茂) (1402–1419)
9. Sō Sadamori (貞盛) (1419–1452) - fought the Korean army led by Yi Chongmu during the Oei Invasion and entered into relations with the Joseon Dynasty
10. Sō Shigemoto (成職) (1452–1468) - granted "Governor of Tsushima" title by the Joseon Court in 1461.
11. Sō Sadakuni (貞國) (1468–1492)
12. Sō Kimori (材盛) (1492–1505)
13. Sō Yoshimori (義盛) (1505–1520) - The Sō Clan supported a Japanese traders' uprising, against Joseon's policies, known as "Three-Ports incident".
14. Sō Morinaga (盛長) (1520–1526)
15. Sō Masamori (将盛) (1526–1539)
16. Sō Haruyasu (晴康) (1539–1553)
17. Sō Yoshishige (義調) (1553–1566)
18. Sō Shigehisa (茂尚) (1566–1569)
19. Sō Yoshizumi (義純) (1569–1579)
20. So Terukage (昭景)(1579–1589) - he submitted himself to Toyotomi Hideyoshi in 1587.
21. So Yoshishige (義調) (1589–1592)
22. Sō Yoshitoshi (義智) (1592–1615) - he was a daimyō under the command of Konishi Yukinaga during the Imjin War (1592–1598).
23. Sō Yoshinari (義成) (1615–1657)
24. Sō Yoshizane (義真) (1657–1692)
25. Sō Yoshitsugu (義倫) (1692–1694)
26. Sō Yoshimichi (義方) (1694–1718)
27. Sō Yoshinobu (義誠) (1718–1730)
28. Sō Michihiro (方熙) (1730–1732)
29. Sō Yoshiyuki (義如) (1732–1752)
30. Sō Yoshishige (義蕃) (1752–1762)
31. Sō Yoshinaga (義暢) (1762–1778)
32. Sō Yoshikatsu (義功) (1778–1785)
33. Sō Yoshikatsu (義功) (1785–1812)
34. Sō Yoshitada (義質) (1812–1838)
35. Sō Yoshiaya (義章) (1838–1842)
36. Sō Yoshinori (義和) (1842–1862)
37. Sō Yoshiaki (義達) (1862–1872)
38. Sō Shigemochi (重望) (1872–1923) - First count of Tsushima.
39. Sō Takeyuki (武志) (1923–1985) - Adopted from the Kuroda clan; he was married to Deokhye, Princess of Korea, from 1931 to 1953
40. Sō Tatsuhito (立人) - current titular head, son of Takeyuki and his second wife Yoshie Katsumura

== See also ==
- Joseon missions to Japan
- Joseon Tongsinsa
