= Pak Chungyang =

Korean politician (1872–1959)

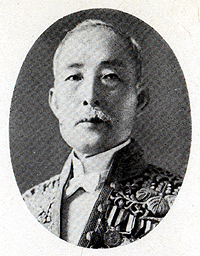

Member of the House of Peers
- In office 3 April 1945 – 4 July 1946 Nominated by the Emperor

Governor of Chūseihoku Province
- In office 24 February 1923 – 31 March 1925
- Monarch: Taishō
- Preceded by: Yoneda Jintarō
- Succeeded by: Kim Yoon-jeong

Governor of Kōkai Province
- In office 12 February 1921 – 24 February 1923
- Monarch: Taishō
- Preceded by: Shin Eung-hee
- Succeeded by: Tōjiro Iio

Governor of Chūseinan Province
- In office 1 October 1910 – 31 March 1915
- Monarchs: Meiji; Taishō
- Preceded by: Office established
- Succeeded by: Shinzō Ohara

Personal details
- Born: 4 May 1872 Junae-myeon, Yangju, Gyeonggi Province, Joseon
- Died: 23 April 1959 (aged 86) Chimsan-dong, Daegu, South Korea
- Children: Bak Mun-wung; Bak Mu-wung; Bak Jeong-ja

Korean name
- Hangul: 박중양
- Hanja: 朴重陽
- RR: Bak Jungyang
- MR: Pak Chungyang

Art name
- Hangul: 해악; 일소
- Hanja: 海岳; 一笑
- RR: Haeak; Ilso
- MR: Haeak; Ilso

Courtesy name
- Hangul: 원근
- Hanja: 源根
- RR: Wongeun
- MR: Wŏn'gŭn

Hochu Segeyo
- Kanji: 朴忠重陽

Yamamoto Shin
- Kanji: 山本信

Pak Chungyang (Korean: 박중양; Hanja: 朴重陽; May 3, 1872 – April 23, 1959) was a Korean bureaucrat and politician in the Japanese colonial government. His art names were Haeak (해악) and Ilso (일소), and his courtesy name was Wongeun (원근). He also had the Japanese names Shigeyō Hōchū (朴忠重陽), Jūyō Boku (朴 重陽) and Shin Yamamoto (山本 信). Pak was Governor of the prefecture Kōkai Prefecture from 1921 to 1923 and in 1928. He was also governor of Chūseihoku Prefecture from 1923 to 1925.

Pak went abroad to Japan to study and later returned to become a bureaucrat in his country. He was appointed as the Mayor of Daegu and the deputy Governor of North Gyeongsang Province from 1906 to 1907. Later, he succeeded sequentially in the positions of Governor of Phyeongannamto, South Jeolla Province, North Gyeongsang Province, Phyeonganpukto and South Chungcheong Province. Pak was involved in the Japan–Korea Treaty of 1910 and opposed the March First Movement. He also founded the Refrain Club.

He demolished the castle of Daegueup and the Old Gyungsangdo Provincial Office, and contributed to city planning and road maintenance in Daegu. He also participated in the destruction of the Castle of Jinju. He was a conscientious Japanese colonial supporter with pro-Japanese group ideology as well as an advocate for civil rights.

Pak was pro-Japanese, and was later named a collaborator ("chinilpa") after World War II.

== Early life ==
Pak Chungyang was born on May 3, 1872, in Junae-myeon in Yangju County, Gyeonggi Province, Joseon. He was the second son of Pak Jeong-ho (박정호, 朴鼎鎬; 1840 – September 22, 1892) and Lady Yi of the Jeonju Yi clan (April 21, 1845 – July 12, 1929). The origin of his family is unknown, but it is speculated that he either came from the Miryang Park clan (밀양 박씨) or the Bannam Park clan (반남 박씨). His father supervised a rent farm and leased it out as well. He had three brothers; one older brother and two younger brothers.

In his adolescence, he joined the Independence Club, but it was dispersed due to the repression of the Korean Empire. This caused Pak to be disappointed and left him with a bad feeling against the Korean Empire.

In March 1894, the Korean Empire employed and dispatched assassins to Japan and China. In Shanghai, China Kim Ok-kyun, a reform minded activist, was murdered by assassin Hong Jong-u. Kim's body was turned over to a Chinese warship, where it was dismembered. Parts of his body were put on public display in several towns in Korea as a traditional humiliation and punishment for treason. When Hong returned to Korea he was appointed to high office. Pak grew an extreme hatred towards the Korean Empire and the people of Korea.

=== International study ===
From an early age, he wanted to go abroad to Japan. In 1897, he was selected as a Korean state student to study abroad in Japan. Pak supported himself during his studies because his family was poor. From 1897 to 1900, he studied in Aoyama middle school. In 1900, he entered Dokyo buki high school as a banking major. Then, he added a double major in Japanese police studies there. After the graduation, Pak adopted Neo-Confucianism and the 'Theory of the national prosperity and the military power' from Ito Hirobumi.

At the time, he chose the Japanese name Yamamoto Shin. Pak also became a Japanese petty bureaucrat. He tried to introduce the parliamentary system to the Imperial Korean government, but the Korean government refused.

In 1903, he returned and passed the probation period as a civil officer of Imperial Korea. After returning to Korea, Pak continued to advocate a pro-Japanese position.

== Career ==
=== Korean Empire era ===
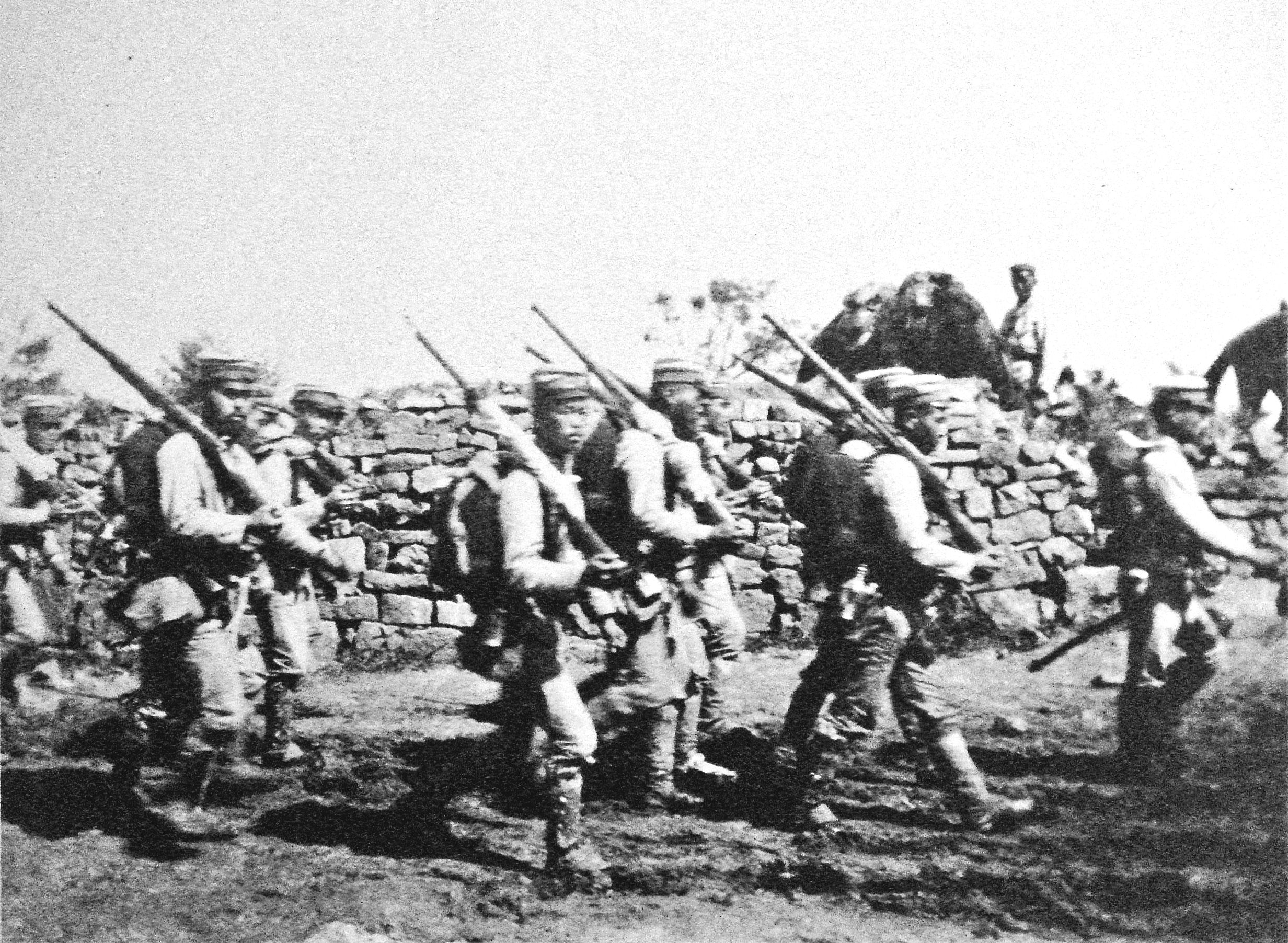
Russo-Japanese War

In 1903, Pak successfully filled various government posts, and was also appointed as a staff of the Public Administration Agency. In 1905, he served as a military interpreter during the Russo-Japanese War. In November 1905, he was appointed to the staff of the Farming, Commerce and Industry Department. He resigned when the Japan–Korea Treaty of 1905 was signed. On May 5, he was appointed as an engineer of the National Defense Department (군부;軍部) engineer, and accompanied Prince Yi Kang to go to Japan. Two months later, he returned to his country.

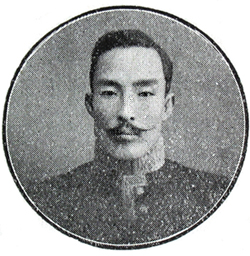
Pak Chungyang (1907.06)

In 1906, Pak was promoted to Governor of Daegu County. Then, after a short period, he was promoted again to the Acting Governor of the North Gyeongsang Province. During the term, Pak tore down the castle of Daegueup without official permission He secretly hired Japanese workers to tear down the structure. also Pak was lay out a new street. In early 1906, he applied for permission from the Korean government, but it was refused. The government tried to punish him for the action, but he acquired protection from Ito Hirobumi. Later, he modernized the Daegu city planning and road maintenance.

He strove in building modern hospitals, medical schools and colleges, and successfully built the Dojin hospital and its affiliated medical school. He was also a supporter of the free press, including journals which satirized him. His idea was that the freedom of the press is a must to supervise the government.

In 1907, he became a governor of Phyeongannamto and Phyeonganpukto, and in 1910, the Governor of South Chungcheong Province.

=== Japanese rule ===
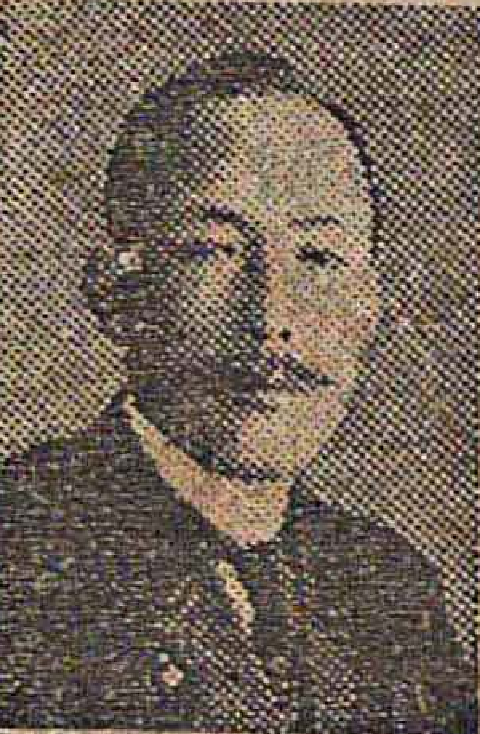
Pak Chungyang at the time of his service as Governor of North Chungcheong Province

When the Japan–Korea Treaty of 1910 was signed in August 1910, Pak remained as the Governor of Chungcheongnam-do until 1915. From 1916 to 1920, he was a member of Japanese Government-General of Korea's Privy Council. In 1919, he opposed the March First Movement, and founded the Refrain club on 6 April in response. Pak was hindrance and dissuade, advice of go home of demonstrato of March First Movement. His old friends Philip Jaisohn and Yun Chi-ho cut off relations with him due to this.

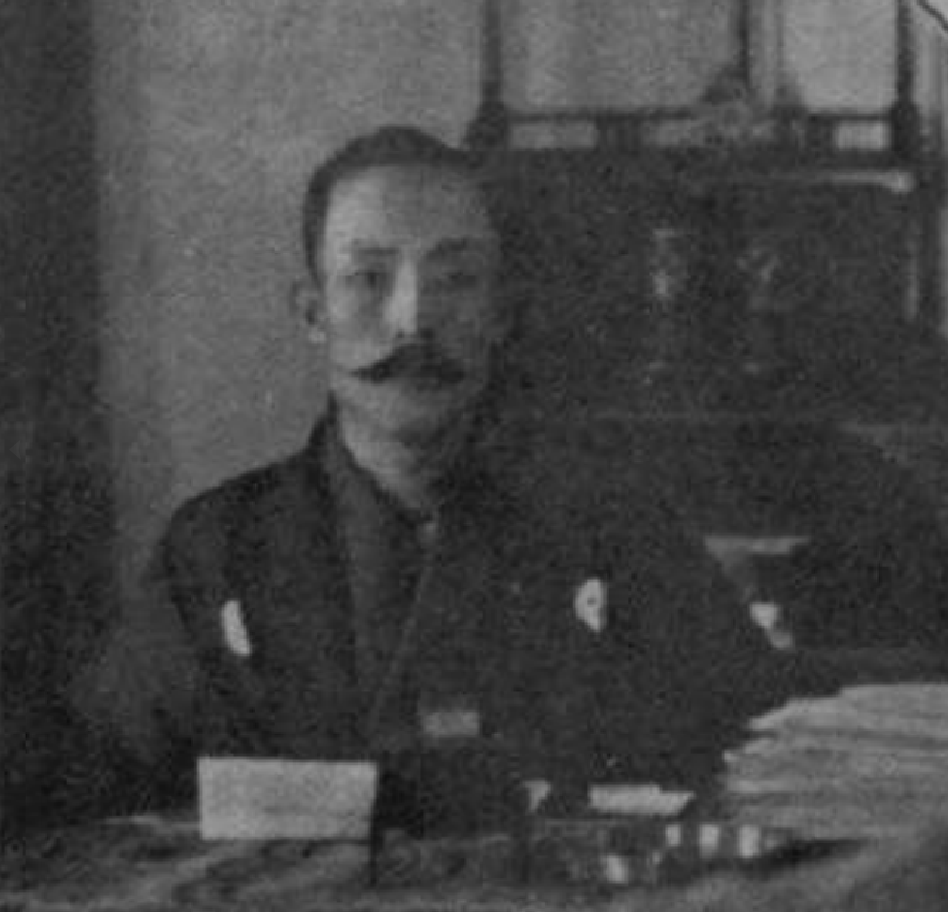
Pak Chungyang, 1923

He was appointed as the Governor of Kōkai Prefecture in 1921, and the Governor of Chūseihoku Prefecture in 1923 to 1925. After the 1923 Great Kantō earthquake and subsequent Kantō Massacre, he appealed to the Japanese government to release the arrested Koreans, and asserted that the Koreans were not involved in the criminal cases which occurred during the earthquake. In November 1924, he was accused in a sex abuse scandal, but the accuser woman suddenly died; three years later, the charge against him was dismissed. In 1928, he was re-appointed as the Governor of Kōkai Prefecture.

He governed the civilians through a regulated bureaucracy system, often with warning and several days of confinement instead of punishment, and suppressed the power of the Japanese police and soldiers to harass civilians, even putting them in confinement as well. Sometimes, the bureaucrats were imprisoned, but the Japanese police never arrested him, because he was especially trusted by the Japanese Governor-General of Korea, which pleased many Joseon people.

=== World War II era ===
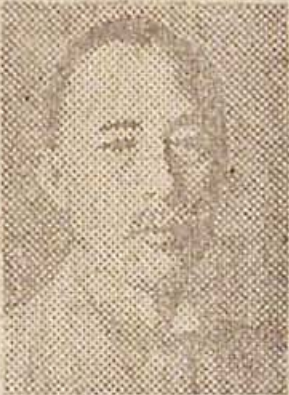
Pak Chungyang, later 1930's

In 1927 to 1939, he was a member of Japanese Government-General of Korea's Privy Council; and in 1936, the advisor of Japanese Government-General of Korea's Privy Council. Seven years later, he was elected as the vice-chairman of the council. In 1940, he changed name to Hōchū Segeyō as per the Japanese Sōshi-kaimei.

On October 22, 1941, he was appointed as the adviser of the Fight-patriotic of Joseon Group, which merged with the Peoples Mind Alliance in January 1943. During the Asia-Pacific War, he contributed to encourage and comfort the Japanese troops, as in 1942 and 1943, when he was sent to console the Japanese troops stationed in Singapore. In 1943, he was appointed as vice-chairman of Japanese Government-General of Korea's Privy Council. On 3 April 1945, he was elected as a congressman in the House of Peers.

Due to his cooperation with the Japanese Empire and the Japanese Governor-General of Korea, he was listed as a Pro-Japanese collaborators in Korea by the Institute for Research in Collaborationist Activities in 2008.

== Later years ==
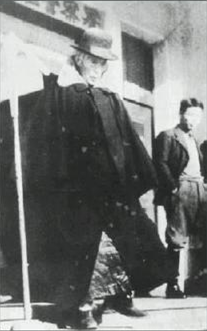
Arrest of Pak Chungyang (1949)

Korea was liberated on August 15, 1945, after the end of World War II, but Pak stayed in Daegu. He mocked the Korean independence activists for talking about their heroic deeds in the independence battle.

After October 1945, as some pro-Japanese group begged for their lives, he ridiculed Korean resistance activists. On January 1, 1949, he was arrested by the Special Investigation Committee of Anti-National Activities and charged under the National Traitor Law. But, Pak maintained his innocence at the court and stood by his pro-Japanese beliefs.

The Joseon dynasty was society of more darkness, Japanese ruled time was reformed of modern Korea. The goal for civil servants was social welfare. Japanese ruled time was "squeeze the peoples blood's", it's assert that also unaware of politics meaning, prejudice of causeless Japanese hates.

In February 1949, he was released on bail due to bronchial pneumonia and asthma. Later, he continued to criticize President Syngman Rhee, Kim Ku, Lee See-yeong and Ham Tae-yeong as "patrioteers". In 1955, Rhee tried to confine Pak to a So-ju-yeong psychiatric hospital and Seoul Seongmo psychiatric hospital, but failed. Pak Chungyang died Chimsan Mountine, in Daegu on April 23, 1959, due to pneumonia. the cause of death is lung disease and Senile disease.

== Personal life ==
=== Family ===
One version says he was an adopted son of Itō Hirobumi. But in 1948, he spoke to some press company and confirmed it was a lie. He referred to Itō as "My respected teacher".

He had a wife named Yi Ju-yeol (이주열, 李主悅/李柱烈; 4 March 1870 – 20 May 1960), who was a member of the royal Jeonju Yi clan, and four sons and three daughters. His first son Park Mun-ung (박문웅, 朴文雄; December 7, 1890 – 14 August 1959) was the succeeding mayor of Cheongdo, Cheongsong, Sangju, and Dalseong County in North Gyeongsang Province in 1940s. It is unknown when his second son Park Mu-ung (박무웅; 朴武雄) died and his other children died, but his third son had and was survived by his daughter, Park Du-sun (박두순; 朴斗順).

His granddaughter, Park Mun-ung's daughter, Park Bu-nam (박부남, 朴富南; December 6, 1931 – January 1, 2018) was a pediatrician and internist, she was a university professor at the College of Medicine of Kyungpook National University, Keimyung University. Park Bu-nam eventually married Yi Yeol-hui (이열희, 李烈熙; 18 December 1924 – 9 August 2012) who was a member of the Gyeongju Yi clan. Yi Yeol-hui is a dentist and plastic surgeon, Yi was a university professor of College of Medicine of Kyungpook National University and nephew of poet Yi Sang-hwa and resistance activists Yi Sang-jeong, politician Yi Sang-baek.

Pak Chungyang had a daughter, Park Jeong-ja (박정자, 朴政子; 1936–?), with an unnamed Japanese concubine who was born in 1909.

=== Pet name ===
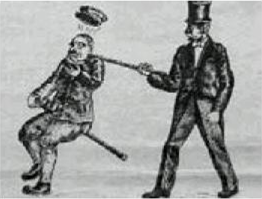
Satirical cartoon of Pak Chungyang's Stick

He had "Stick Mr. Pak" (박작대기/박짝대기) as his pet name. The pet name was selected as such because Pak always carried a long stick, sometime called the "Enlightened Stick".

=== Other ===
For decades, Pak regularly wrote in his diary every day, which was stored in 20 boxes. Pak's diary was captured when he was arrested by the Special Investigation Committee of Anti-National Activities. Even after being release Pak didn't get his diary back. Pak wrote a memoir "Sulhoe", copy paper of some diary and his memories.

== Books ==
- 《Pak Chungyang's Diary》(박중양일기; 朴重陽日記)
- 《Sulhoe》(술회; 述懷)
- 《Sinnyeon sogam》(신년소감; 新年所感)
- 《Pokdosa pyeonjip jaryo》(폭도사편집자료; 暴徒史編輯資料; 1907)

== Gallery ==
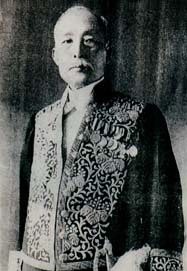
Pak Chungyang (1941)

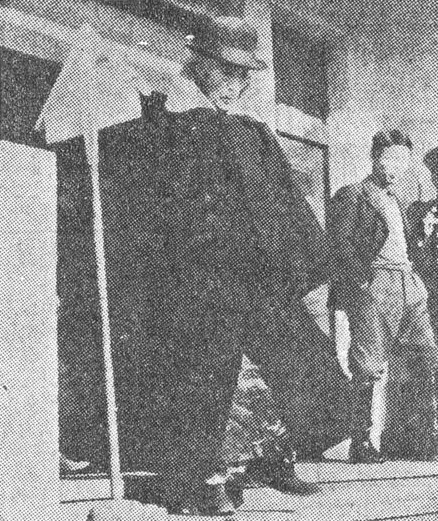
Pak Chungyang (Jan 1949)

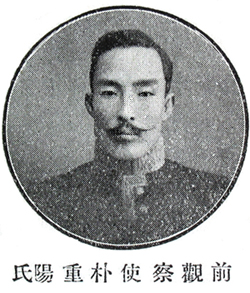
Pak Chungyang (Jun 1907)

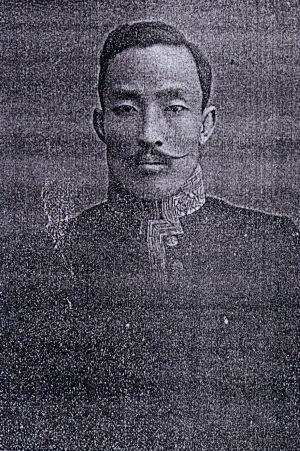
Pak Chungyang (1908)

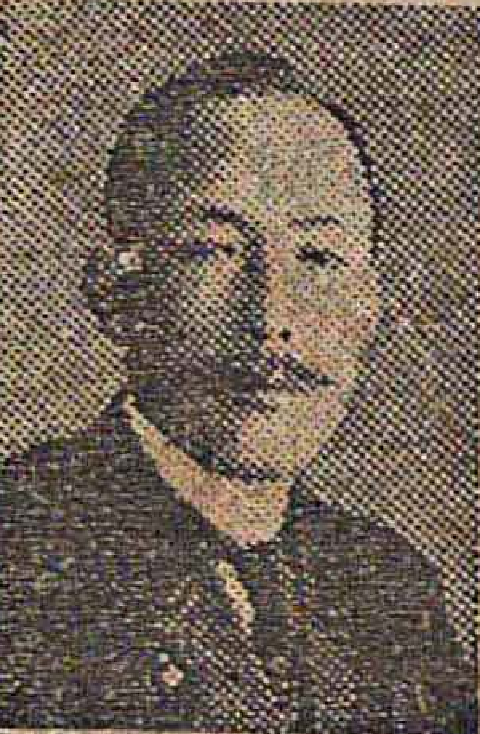
Pak Chungyang (1925)

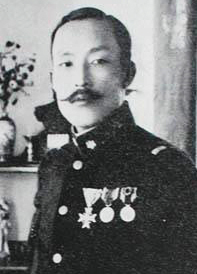
Pak Chungyang (1932)

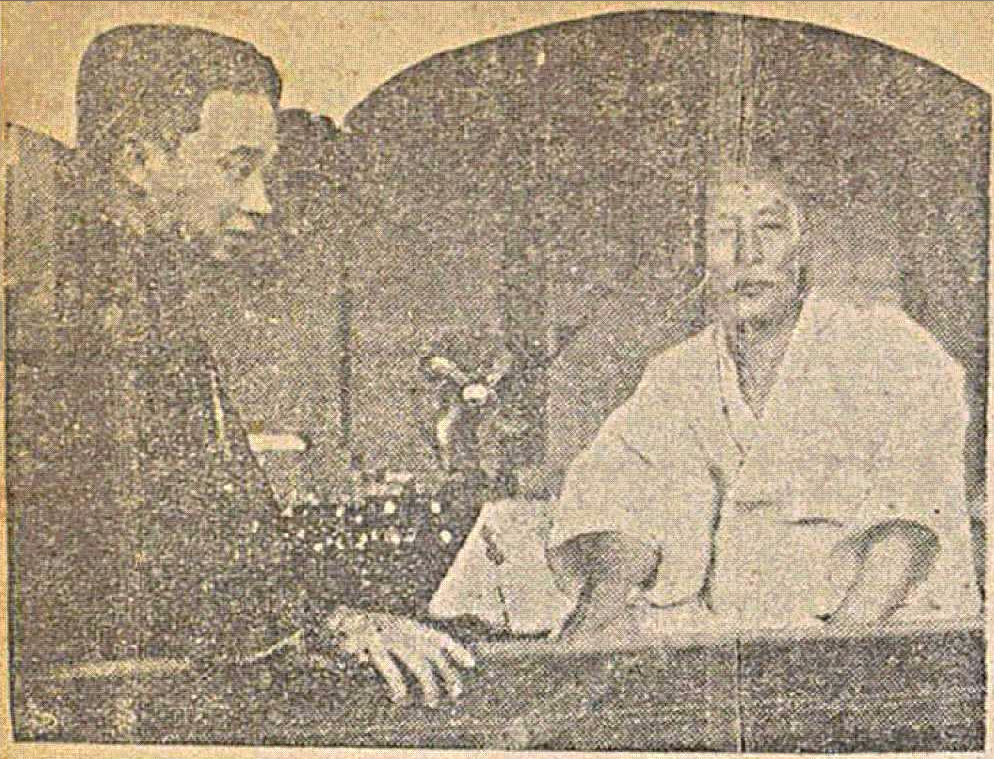
Pak Chungyang and one jounarists (1935)

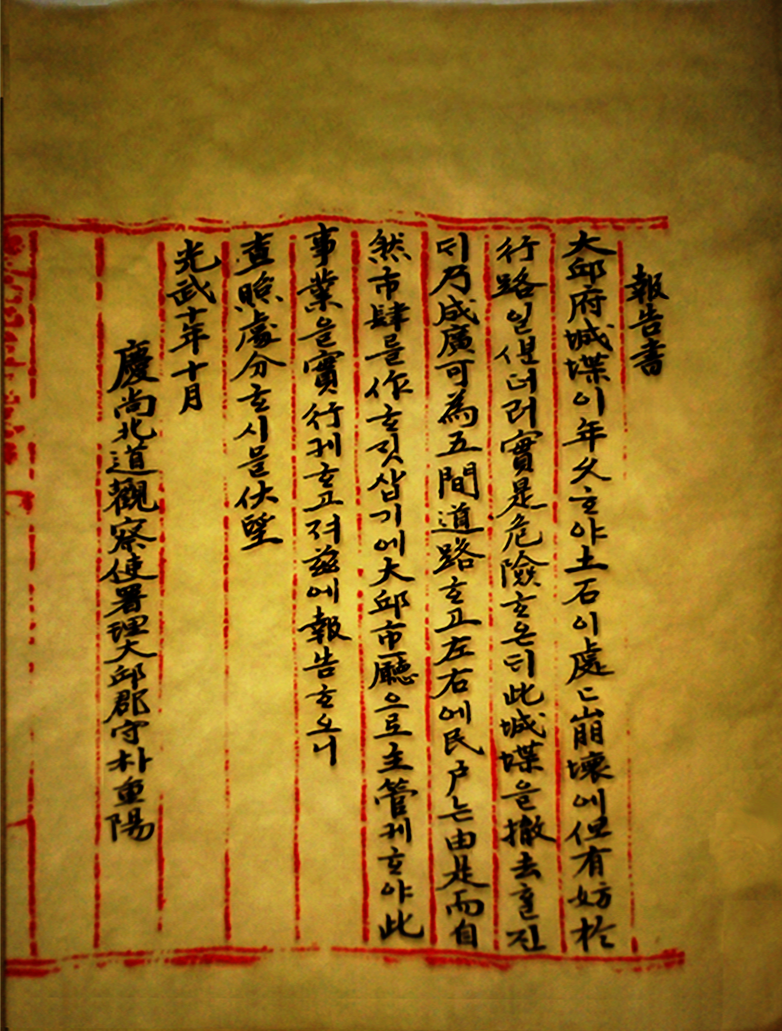
Report of Demolition Daegu Castle (Oct 1906)

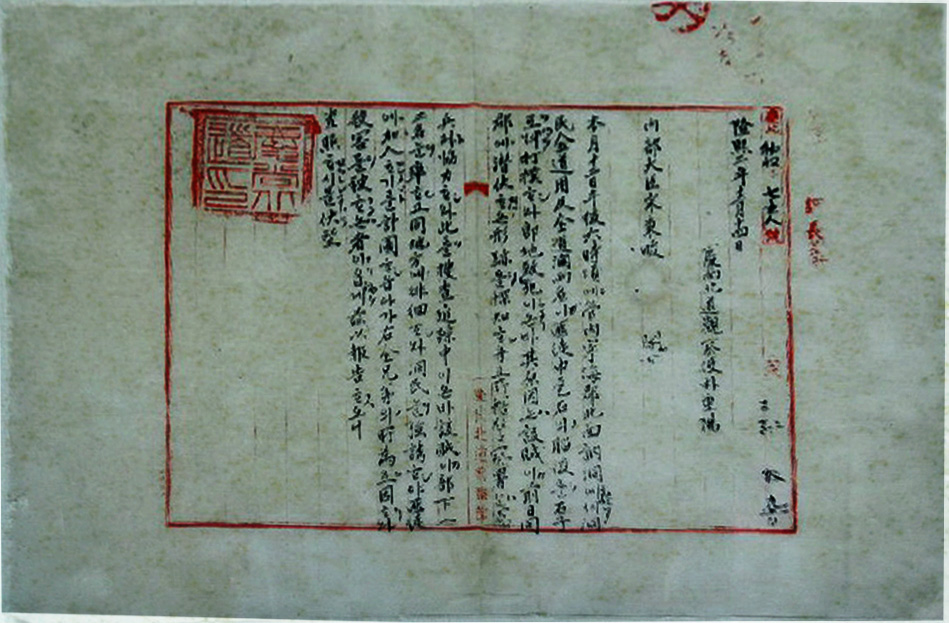
A Handwriting letter to Emperor Kojong (Nov 1, 1909)

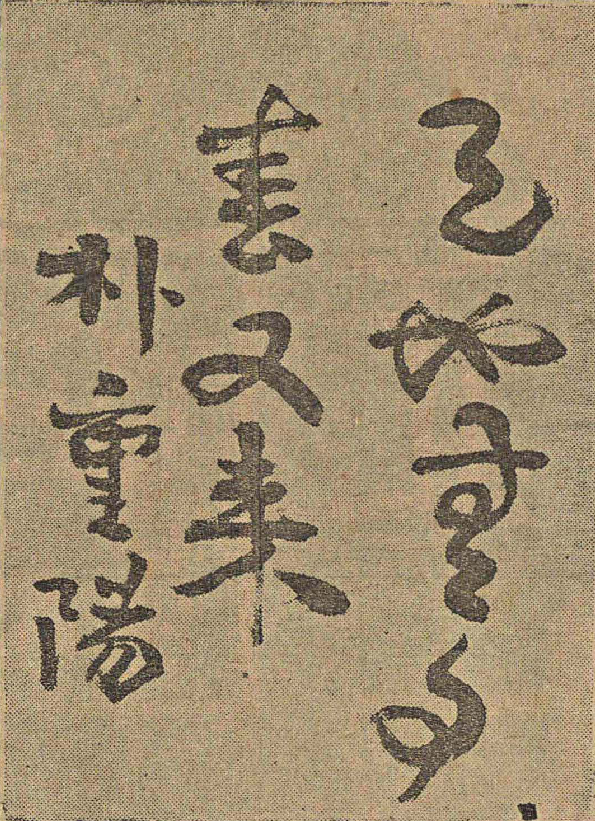
A calligraphy art (Nov 30, 1933)

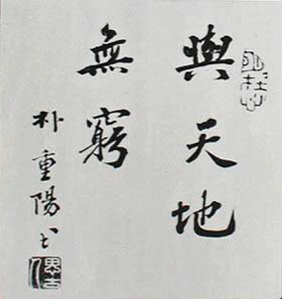
A calligraphy art, send to Hoseo News (Mar 1, 1932)

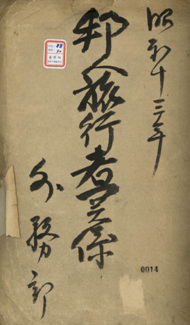
Holographic Report of Business trip orders (1938)

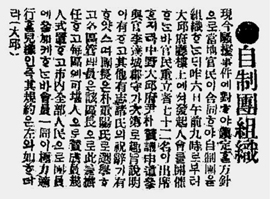
News of Refrain club, his founding club (Apr 16, 1919)

== See also ==
- Yun Chi-ho
- Philip Jaisohn
- Refrain club
- Yu Kil-chun
- Yun Chi-oh
- Russo-Japanese War
- Kim Okkyun
- Syngman Rhee
- Kim Kyu-sik
