= Korean collaborators with the Empire of Japan =

From the late 19th century and until 1945, a number of ethnic Koreans worked with the Empire of Japan. Some of these figures contributed to or benefitted from Japan's colonization of Korea, and some actively worked to counter the Korean independence movement. These people are now considered by much of Korea to have been collaborators with Japan, and thus traitors to Korea.

Examples of such people include members of the Iljinhoe or Five Eulsa Traitors.

Prosecution of collaborators began after the liberation of Korea, although the prosecution was interfered with by the South Korean leader Syngman Rhee. Prosecution in South Korea was revived after the gradual democratization during the 1980s and 1990s. The first anti-collaborator legislation was passed in South Korea in 2005: the Special Law to Redeem Pro-Japanese Collaborators' Property.

Chinilpa (Korean: 친일파; Hanja: 親日派; lit. 'pro-Japan faction') and builbae (Korean: 부일배; Hanja: 附日輩; lit. 'that ilk who collaborated with Japan') are words used to describe collaborators. These terms can be considered derogatory.

== Terminology ==
The term "chinilpa" (친일파) first appeared in the 1966 book Chinilmunhangnon (친일문학론; lit. 'Comments on Pro-Japanese Literature'), written by the Korean independence activist Im Jong-Guk. Before its publication, it was common to call collaborators builbae (친일반민족행위자; 친일반민족행위자; lit. 'Pro-Japanese Anti National Activists') The term was generally targeted at Korean colonial leadership.

The term is distinct from jiilpa (지일파; 知日派; lit. 'knowledgeable-about-Japan faction'), which has a politically neutral connotation.

== History ==
=== Colonial period ===
While the term has taken on a meaning of "[national] traitor", only a minority of the early collaborators were opportunists. Most of the high officials working with the Japanese in the beginning believed they were doing what was in the best interests of their country as it struggled to adapt to modernity. The collaborators were one of a number of factions that existed at that time. They were distinguished by concerns with modernizing Korea along a pattern set by another country (e.g. a Russian faction, Chinese faction, American faction, and so on). This term was not coined until 1966 by scholar Im Chongguk (1929–1989).

=== Treatment of collaborators following independence ===
In the immediate liberation of Korea, American General Douglas MacArthur initially requested that the Japanese colonial authorities and their Korean trainees continue to run Korea until natives could be trained to replace them.

Korean outrage did lead to the former being purged, but many of the latter collaborators were able to hold onto their positions. Similar to the United States's incomplete denazification of Germany and reverse course in Japan, the United States Military Government of Korea believed these right-wing collaborator officials were useful in light of the nascent Cold War and the deteriorating situation among political factions in the Korean Peninsula.

The Special Committee for Prosecution of Anti-National Offenders (반민특위; banmin teugwi) was set up in 1948 to prosecute the collaborators. It handled 682 cases; 559 cases were handed over to a special prosecutor's office, which handed down indictments in 221 cases. A special tribunal tried 38 cases, and sentenced persons convicted as guilty in 12 cases. One person was sentenced to death. Eighteen others had their civil rights suspended, six others were declared innocent, and the remaining two were found guilty but were exempted from punishment. The Supreme Court suspended the execution in March 1950, just before the Korean War.

The dictator at that time, Syngman Rhee, sabotaged and dissolved the banmin teugwi. Under Rhee's regime and in subsequent governments before the Sixth Republic, many of the former collaborators enjoyed the same wealth and power they had under Japanese rule. Rhee employed many former collaborators in government and military in order to combat North Korea and communist sympathizers in South Korea. The next of South Korea's prominent dictators, Park Chung Hee, was himself a collaborator who served in the Imperial Japanese military system. During the Cold War, collaborators were seen as a somewhat taboo subject given that many authorities were at one time collaborators themselves, and thus criticism of collaborators could be seen as questioning the legitimacy of the regime. Similar pressure to silence was also applied to some collaborator literary figures.

An early study into collaborators was done by "maverick scholar" Im Chongguk (1929–1989), whose 1966 work Ch'inil Munhak-ron (친일문학론 Treatise on Pro-Japanese Literature) broke the silence on the subject matter. Although it was obscure in its day and didn't have a wide readership, a smattering of articles on the subject appeared in the late 1970s and by the 1980s, Im took his quarter-century's worth of study on the subject and began to publish more systemic works about collaborators in general, not just literary studies. Chongguk's personal zeal about honestly examining darker pages from national history were not very popular in his day, but by the 1990s, his legacy had strengthened and the topic became more accepted by the South Korean public. However, the old stigma still persisted to some extent in academia, as established mainstream scholars were seemingly "reluctant to dabble in such an irrelevant and 'humiliating' subject" as collaborators, and much of the interest and writing on the topic came from junior scholars and nonacademics such as independent researchers, literary critics, and journalists.

=== Prosecution of collaborators in the 21st century ===
After more than 50 years have passed since the end of prosecution of collaborators under the Syngman Rhee administration, the prosecution restarted abruptly as a political agenda of President Roh Moo-hyun.

==== Definition of collaborators by the Special Law ====
The Special Law on the Inspection of Collaborations for the Japanese Imperialism, enacted 28 December 2005, defines "pro-Japanese and anti-national actions" (chinilpa) as follows.

article 2
Under this act, "pro-Japanese and anti-national actions" means any of the following actions committed between the outbreak of the Russo-Japanese War that began the deprivation of Korean sovereignty by the Japanese imperialism, and August 15, 1945.

1. Any act to attack or order to attack the military forces fighting against the Japanese imperialism to keep sovereign power.
3. Any act to kill, execute, harass, or arrest the persons or their families participating in the independent movement or anti-Japanese movement, and an act to instruct or order those violences thereto.
6. Any act to agree, join, or conspire in the treaties that interfered with the sovereign power, including the Eulsa Treaty, Japan-Korea Annexation Treaty, and others.
8. Any act of participating in the National Diet of the Japanese Empire as a member of the House of Peers or House of Representatives.
9. Any act of participating as vice chairman, adviser, or member of the House of Representatives or the Senate of the Choson Government-General.
10. Any act of participation in the invasion war (World War II) as an officer of the Japanese imperial armed forces above the rank of lieutenant.
14. Any act to manufacture military supplies for the Japanese imperial armed forces, or donate money and goods to them above the amount determined by Presidential Decree.

The law is concerned about the independence movement, unlike the ex-Nazi prosecution which concentrated on war crimes. Most remarkable are items 8 and 9. Being a law-maker during that time qualifies one as a "pro-Japanese and anti-national Collaborator" regardless of what one did as a law-maker.

==== Developments ====
On August 29, 2005, a civic organization, the Institute for Research in Collaborationist Activities disclosed a list of 3094 Korean collaborator suspects including Park Chung Hee, the former Korean president, Kim Seong-su, a former publisher of The Dong-A Ilbo and the founder of Korea University, and Bang Eung-mo, a former president of The Chosun Ilbo.

On December 6, 2006, a South Korean presidential commission, the Investigative Commission on Pro-Japanese Collaborators' Property revealed the first official collaborators list of 106 persons during 1904 to March First Movement in 1919 was including four of the Five Eulsa Traitors.

On August 18, 2006, the commission started the investigation before seizing the property obtained by collaborators during Japanese colonization.

On May 2, 2007, the South Korean government announced its plan to seize assets gained by pro-Japanese collaborators during Japanese colonial rule, amounting 3.6 billion won (US$3.9 million, €2.8 million) worth of land from the descendants of nine pro-Japanese collaborators. On August 13, 2007, the commission decided to confiscate about 1 million square meters of land valued at 25.7 billion won that is now owned by the descendants of another ten pro-Japanese collaborators.

On September 17, 2007, the commission revealed the second list of 202 collaborators focused on pro-Japanese figures between 1919 and 1937. The list includes Song Byeong-jun who sent letters to the Japanese government asking for a merger; Lee Ji-yong, who is one of the Five Eulsa Traitors; Lee Doo-hwang, who participated in the murder of Empress Myeongseong in 1895 and later became a governor of the North Jeolla Province; novelist Yi In-jik, the author of Hyeoleuinu (Tears of Blood); Yoo Hak-ju, a council member of the Iljinhoe; Bae Jeong-ja, foster daughter of the first Resident-General of Korea who spied on Korean independence activists and recruited comfort women; and Park Je-bin, who formed a tribute group to pay condolences at Ito's funeral in 1926. On the same day, the Seoul administrative court rejected a lawsuit against the commission to erase the names of the son and grandson of Daewon-gun (father of Gojong of the Korean Empire) from the list, who allegedly attended the signing of the Japan-Korea Annexation Treaty as representatives of the royal family.

The official list during the most controversial period (1937–1945) that may contain persons who played important roles in South Korean development after the independence and enlisted in the 2005 list of the Institute for Research in Collaborationist Activities had not been revealed as of September 2007.

Since the enactment of the Special Law on the Inspection of Collaboration with Japanese Imperialism in 2004 and the special law to redeem pro-Japanese collaborators' property in 2005, the committee has made a list of 452 pro-Japanese collaborators and examined the land of 109 among them. The total size of the land is estimated at 13.1 million square meters, worth almost 100 billion won.

The confiscated properties will be appropriated, with priority, to reward Koreans who contributed to the independence of Korea from Japan.

== See also ==
- Japanese war crimes
- Anti-Japanese sentiment in Korea
- Five Eulsa Traitors
- Japan–Korea disputes
- Japan–Korea relations
- Race traitor
- Quisling - Scandinavian and English equivalent
- Makapili – Filipino equivalent
- Hanjian – Chinese equivalent
- Jewish collaboration with Nazi Germany
- Judenrat - Jewish equivalent in Nazi Germany and its occupied territories
- Razakar (Pakistan) - Bangladeshi equivalent
