= 忠淸南道 =

忠淸南道 or 忠清南道, may refer to:

- South Chungcheong Province
- Chūseinan-dō
