= 忠淸北道 =

忠淸北道 or 忠清北道, may refer to:

- North Chungcheong Province
- Chūseihoku-dō
