= Refrain Club =

1919 pro-Japanese organization in Korea

- Hangul: 자제단; 자제회
- Hanja: 自制團; 自制會
- RR: Jajedan; Jajehoe
- MR: Chajedan; Chajehoe

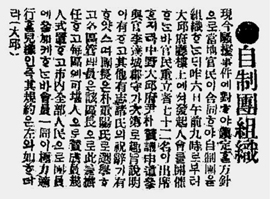
The News was founder to Refrain club

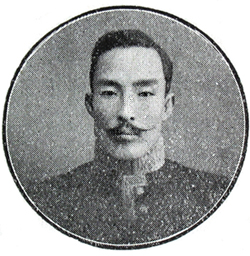
chairman Park Jung-yang

Refrain Club (Korean: 자제단) was a Korean civic group and self-governing body club, founder of Park Jung-yang and Yun Phil-oh, Lee Chin-ho. It was founded by the Anti-March 1st Movement. Refrain club's Korean spelling is Chachedan and Chache Club (자제단, 자제회).

In March 1919, Japan ruled Korea. Korean independence movements such as March 1st Movement resisted the occupation. The Refrain group opposed the effort, including all violence. The club disbanded in December 1919.

== See also ==
- March 1st Movement
- Park Jung-yang
- Yun Phil-oh
