= History of Japan–Korea relations =

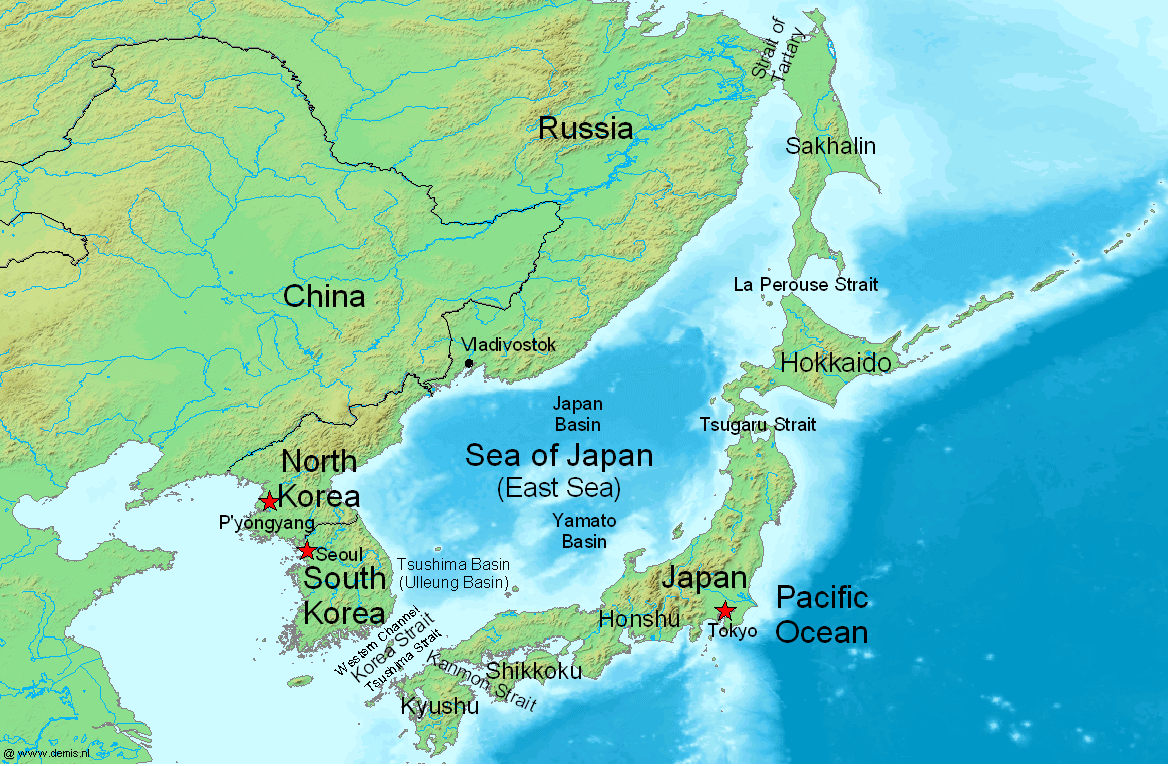
Japanese and the Korean peninsula are separated by the Sea of Japan

The history of relations between Japan and Korea has included periods of cultural exchange, trade, political cooperation, and military conflict over at least 2000 years. Korea served as an important channel for the transmission of continental Asian culture, technology, religion, and political ideas to Japan. Relations were also shaped by conflicts such as the Japanese invasions of Korea (1592–1598), which remain an important issue in historical memory and modern diplomacy.

In the early 20th century, Korea was annexed by Japan under the Japan–Korea Treaty of 1910. Following Japan's defeat in World War II, Korea was divided into Soviet and American occupation zones, leading to the establishment of North Korea and South Korea in 1945. The Korean War (1950–1953) shaped postwar relations between Japan and the two Korean states.

Japan and South Korea established diplomatic relations under the Treaty on Basic Relations between Japan and the Republic of Korea in 1965, although disputes over historical memory, territorial claims such as the Liancourt Rocks, and interpretations of Japanese colonial rule have continued to affect relations. Japan and North Korea remain without formal diplomatic relations, while issues such as North Korea's abductions of Japanese citizens during the 1970s and 1980s remain a source of tension. Since the late 20th century, disagreements over history textbooks, wartime memory, and interpretations of the colonial period have remained major issues in relations between Japan and both Koreas.

== Pre-modern period ==
Relations between Korea and Japan go back at least two millennia. From the Yayoi period (c. 300 BC), archaeological evidence indicates increasing contact and migration from the Korean Peninsula to the Japanese archipelago, particularly to Kyushu. These processes are associated with the introduction of wet-rice agriculture and the emergence of the Yayoi culture, which gradually developed through interaction and admixture with indigenous Jōmon populations. In later periods, especially during the Three Kingdoms period of Korea (Goguryeo, Baekje, Silla, and Gaya), historical and archaeological sources record continued maritime contact and exchanges between the Korean Peninsula and Japan. The extent to which these interactions involved organized migration, as opposed to trade and cultural transmission, and their linguistic implications, remains a subject of scholarly debate.

Knowledge of mainland Asia was transmitted via Korea to Japan. According to the description of the Book of Wei, Yamatai-Koku kingdom in Japan and Four Commanderies of Han had diplomatic exchanges around the 3rd century. There are indications of cross-border political influence, but with varying accounts as to in which direction the political influence flowed. Buddhism was introduced to Japan from this Korean monarchy. By the time of the Three Kingdoms period of Korea, Baekje and Gaya sent their princes to the Yamato court in exchange for military support to continue their already-begun military campaigns around 400. Historians believe that by the 4th and 5th centuries AD, Baekje and Gaya would regularly send economical, cultural, and technological aid to Japan in exchange for military and political aid, as the Yamato court desired technological progress and cultural advancement while Baekje and the Gaya states desired Japan's military aid in their wars against Silla and Goguryeo. Records of Baekje missions to Japan and Japanese missions to Baekje help reinforce this position, as many of Baekje's missions to Japan involved sending specialists (such as Monks and Scholars), Buddhist goods, various books and medicines while Japan regularly sent thousands of soldiers, hundreds of horses and scores of ships. Later on, Baekje began to lose its status as the most favored partner of Japan, in part due to its relative decline compared to Goguryeo and Silla as well as the subsequent unification of China by the Sui Dynasty.

Uija, the last king of Baekje (reigned 641–660), formed an alliance with Japan and made Prince Buyeo Pung and King Zenko stay there as their guests. In 660, Baekje fell when it was attacked by Silla, who was in alliance with Tang China. The fall of Baekje was met with an immediate response by the Yamato Court, which considered Baekje a close ally and related country due to their long history of alliance as well as their shared history of intermarriage between the ruling classes and monarchs of their respective nations. The loss of their key ally was so great that Empress Saimei said:

"We learn that in ancient times there have been cases of troops being asked for and assistance requested: to render help in emergencies, and to restore that which has been interrupted, is a manifestation of ordinary principles of right. The Land of Baekje, in its extremity, has come to us and placed itself in our hands. Our resolution in this matter is unshakable. We will give separate orders to our generals to advance at the same time by a hundred routes."

Former generals of Baekje, including Gwisil Boksin, asked Japan to return Prince Buyeo Pung and requested military aid. Japan responded by deploying tens of thousands of troops onto the Korean Peninsula and some estimates claimed that as many as a thousand Japanese ships were dispatched to support Baekje. In 663, Japan, supporting Baekje, was defeated by the allied forces of Silla and Tang China in the Korean Peninsula (the Battle of Baekgang), and the restoration of Baekje ended up in failure. After the fall of Baekje, Japan took in many Baekje Korean refugees who were mainly craftspeople, architects, and scholars who played a major role in the social development of Japan during that period. While at the same time hostility between Japan and Silla escalated. Empress Jitō honored King Zenko by giving him the hereditary title of Kudara no Konikishi and allowed him to pass on his royal lineage to future generations. According to the Shoku Nihongi (続日本紀), Takano no Niigasa came from a background of the naturalized clansmen Yamato-no-Fuhito (和史) and was a 10th-generation descendant of King Muryeong of Baekje. She was chosen as a wife for Emperor Kōnin and subsequently became the mother of Emperor Kanmu.

Japan has had official contact with the Chinese since the 7th to 8th centuries. Chinese culture was introduced to Japan via the Korean Peninsula, but the Korean value slumped when Chinese culture was introduced directly via Japanese missions to Tang China. Emperor Kanmu severed diplomatic relations with Silla in 799. From the early 9th–11th centuries, Japanese pirates plundered the southern region of Korean Peninsula and Korea-Japan relations deteriorated.

During the middle Kamakura period, Japan suffered from the invasions of the Mongol Empire (Yuan dynasty), which was then dominant on the continent, and its partner kingdom, the Goryeo of Korea. The History of Yuan states that the Mongol invasions of Japan began with King Chungnyeol of Goryeo "persistently recommending an expedition to the east to Yuan's emperor in order to force Japan to become its vassal state." In order to invade Japan, the Mongols ordered the Korean king to manufacture 1,000 warships. Additionally, the Japanese saying, "The Mongol ("Mukuri") and Goguryeo ("Kokuri") demons are coming! (むくりこくり)" has its origins back during the time of the Mongol Invasions of Japan. Kokuri is the name of Goguryeo in Japanese and was used as a reference towards Goryeo soldiers that accompanied the Mongols during the invasions.

== Early modern period (16th – 18th centuries) ==
During the Muromachi and Sengoku periods in Japan, pirates sailing from Kyushu attacked ships along the coasts of Korea and China and were feared as Japanese pirates (called "wako" in Japanese). Beginning in the 15th century, feudal lords from Tsushima established three treaty ports on Korea's southern coast, which were then known as waegwan (Japan houses), as enclaves for Japanese envoys and merchants to freely trade at.

=== Imjin War (1592–1598) ===
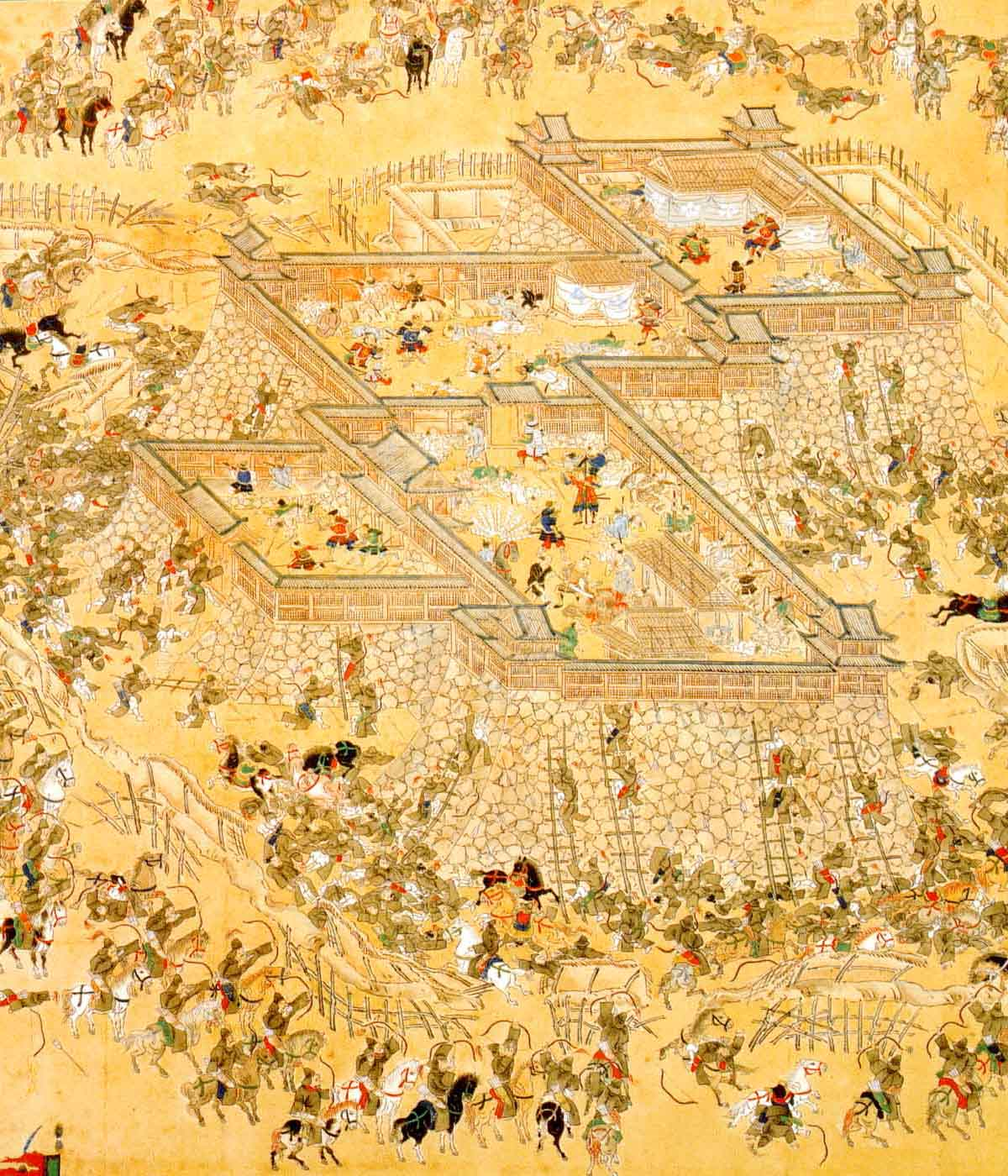
Korean and Chinese troops assault the Japanese forces of Hideyoshi in the siege of Ulsan during the Imjin War.

The Spanish Empire's plan to conquer China was the catalyst. Toyotomi Hideyoshi, who had unified Japan, ordered daimyōs (feudal lords) all over the nation to the conquest of Ming Dynasty China by way of Korea, after the latter's refusal to allow Japanese forces to march through, while King Seonjo alerted its Chinese counterpart regarding the Japanese threat. Japan completed the occupation of the Korean peninsula in three months, thus starting the Imjin war. The Korean king Seonjo first relocated to Pyongyang, then Uiju. In 1593, The Ming Chinese emperor intervened by sending his army and recaptured Pyongyang. However, the Japanese military were able to gather in Seoul and successfully counterattacked China. Although during the war Korean land forces lost most of their land battles (with only a handful of notable exceptions), the Korean Navy won almost all the naval battles with decisive defeats of the Japanese fleet by Admiral Yi Sun-sin, cutting off Japanese supply lines and helping to stall the invading forces on the Korean peninsula. Amid the stagnation of the battle between the Ming army and the Japanese army, Hideyoshi died in September 1598. The Council of Five Elders ordered the remaining Japanese forces in Korea to retreat.

After the war, Japan then initiated a series of policies called Sakoku to isolate itself from world affairs. It forbade Japanese to go abroad in ships, and initiated the death penalty for Japanese people returning to Japan from abroad. This ended Japanese piracy definitively. During the Japanese invasion, much of Korea's cultural heritage was destroyed and looted by the invading Japanese armies. Among the atrocities of Japanese soldiers was the practice of cutting off noses and ears of slain enemy soldiers, which evolved into cutting off those of the living and the civilians in order to fulfill the "kill quota" assigned to the troops. Hence the origin of the Korean saying to misbehaving children, "Ear and nose cutting devils are coming!".

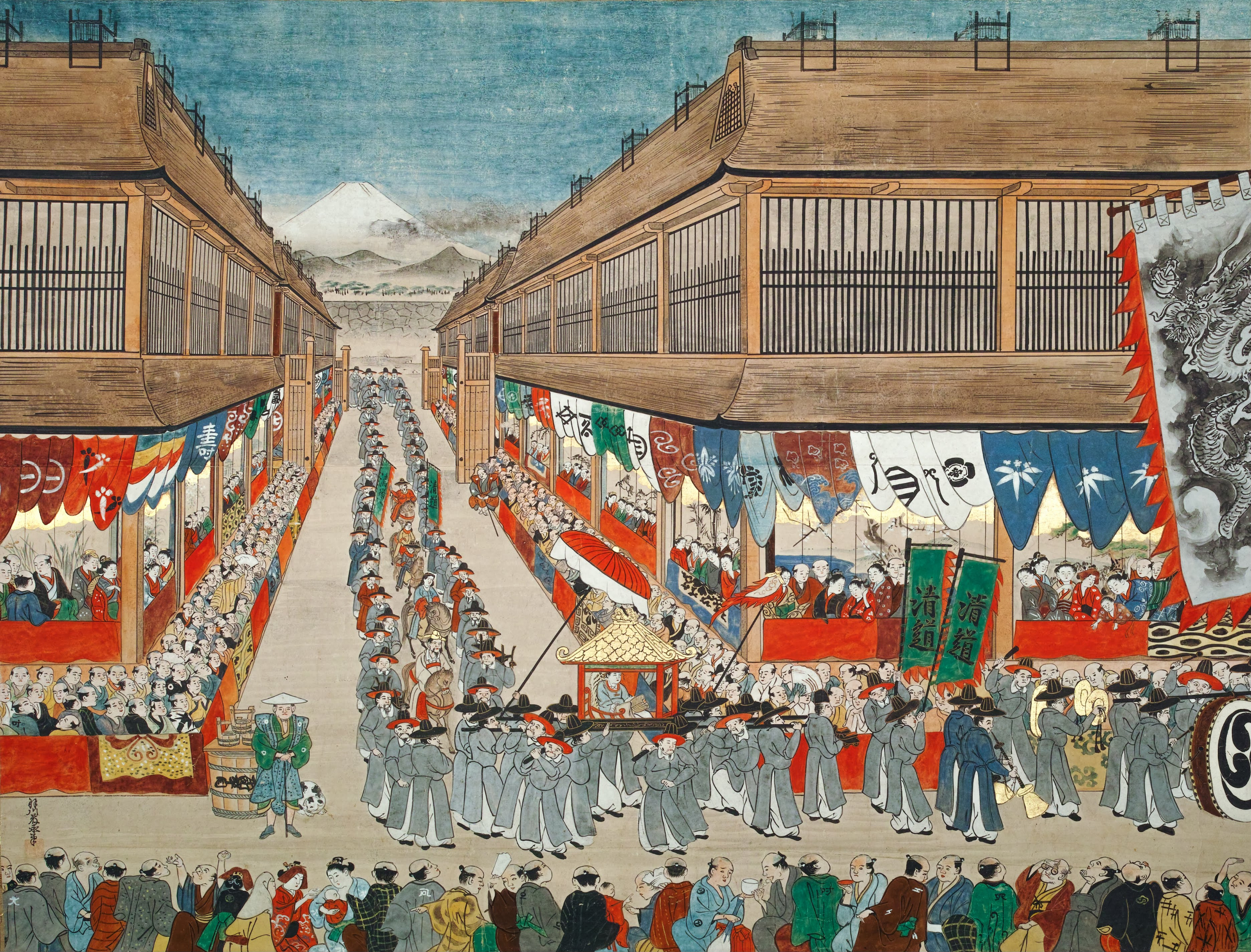
This image of a Joseon diplomatic procession through the streets of Edo in 1748 is entitled Chōsen-jin Uki-e by Hanegawa Tōei, c. 1748

The Imjin War had the effect of severing relations between Korea and Japan. Many Korean experts cite the war (as well as the Mongol Invasions) as the origins for nascent pre-modern Korean nationalism. Korean Historian Kim Haboush cites the widespread mobilization of the civilian volunteer Righteous armies as well as the pre-modern nationalistic rallying cries of the Korean scholar-gentry as indications that a sense of collective consciousness that had formed during the Goryeo period began to fully soldify, cemented by anti-Japanese sentiment amongst Koreans from all societal levels.

It was not until the Tokugawa shogunate started trading again with Korea by concluding the Treaty of Giyu with the Sō clan of Tsushima Island in 1609, establishing a relationship of near equality through mutual visits of Korean messengers. Tsushinshi were sent from Korea to pay homage to a new shogun or to celebrate the birth of an heir to a shogun. Korean envoys were used for showing the prestige of the Tokugawa shogunate and vice versa. After the wars, Korean missions were dispatched 11 times to the Tokugawa shogunate of Japan between 1607 and 1811.

== 19th century ==
=== 1873 rejected proposal to seize Korea: the Seikanron ===
From the late 18th to late 19th centuries, Western governments sought to intercede in and influence the political and economic fortunes of Asian countries through the use of new approaches described by such terms as "protectorate", "sphere of influence", and "concession", which minimized the need for direct military conflict between competing European powers. The newly modernized government of Meiji Japan sought to join these colonizing efforts and the Seikanron ("advocacy of a punitive expedition to Korea") began in 1873. This effort was allegedly fueled by Saigō Takamori and his supporters, who insisted that Japan confront Korea's refusal to recognize the legitimacy of Emperor Meiji, and as it involves the authority of the emperor, and military intervention "could not be postponed".

The debate concerned Korea, then in the sphere of influence of Qing China, which Samurai leaders sought to seize and make it a puppet state. Those in favor also saw the issue as an opportunity to find meaningful employment for the thousands of out-of-work samurai, who had lost their traditional local governmental roles in the new Meiji political order. Further, the acquisition of Korea would provide both a foothold on the Asian continent for Japanese expansion and a rich source of raw materials for Japanese industry. Ōkubo Toshimichi attacked in his "7 Point Document", dated October 1873. The Iwakura Mission, a Japanese diplomatic voyage to the United States and Europe, had led Japanese military officials to conclude their armed forces were far too weak to engage in any conflict with the Western powers. An invasion of Korea would expose Japan to a devastating war and thus the action against Korea was premature. Furthermore, the Japanese financial system was too underdeveloped to support a major war, and its munitions industry was unprepared to handle European technology. Okubo's views were supported by the antiwar faction, which mostly consisted of men who had been on the Iwakura Mission. Iwakura Tomomi, the diplomat who had led the mission, persuaded the emperor to reconsider, thus putting an end to the "Korean crisis" debate.

With the rapid weakening erosion of the authority of the Qing dynasty in 1840s–1850s, Korea resisted traditional subservience to China. Japan was rapidly modernizing in the second half of the 19th century but worried that China or Russia would use Korea to threaten Japan. With the Japan–Korea Treaty of 1876, Japan decided the expansion of their settlement, the addition of the market and acquired an enclave in Busan. A severe conflict at court between Heungseon Daewongun, the biological father of Gojong (king of the Joseon Dynasty), and Gojong's wife Empress Myeongseong continued. In 1882, Daewongun was seized by the Qing military, and confined in Tianjin City (Jingo Incident). The Min clan including Queen Min assumed authority, but relations between Korea and Japan did not turn better, the Min clan changing their policies from being pro-Japanese to pro-Qing China. When Japan beat China in 1895 in the First Sino-Japanese War, the Treaty of Shimonoseki was concluded, and removed China's suzerainty over Korea. Japan became alarmed when Russia enhanced its grip and influence over the Korean peninsula by acquiring vital state assets such as the mining rights in Chongsong and Gyeongwon sold off by Queen Min, such as timber rights in the north, and tariff rights, so it purchased back and restored many of these. Japan's victory against China in the First Sino-Japanese War, released Korea from China's tributary system and the Treaty of Shimonoseki forced China to acknowledge Korea as an "independent" nation. Japan began the process of invading Korea; however, the Min clan, including the Queen Min, started attempts to protect Korea from the rise of Japanese power in Korea.

In 1895, Queen Min was assassinated, and then burned in public by Japan's military, in retaliation for her efforts to promote Russian influence and resist the Japanese invasion. The brutal assassination of the queen was a traumatic event, given Queen Min's popularity among the Korean people. The Gabo Reform and the assassination of Empress Myeongseong generated backlash against Japanese presence in Korea; it caused some Confucian scholars, as well as farmers, to form over 60 successive righteous armies to fight for Korean freedom on the Korean peninsula.

In 1897, Joseon was renamed the Korean Empire (1897–1910), affirming its independence, but greatly gravitated closer to Russia, with the King ruling from the Russian legation, and then using Russian guards upon return to his palace.

== 20th century ==
=== Japanese protectorate ===
Japan declared war on Russia to drive out Russian influence, while Korea declared to be neutral. Japan's victory in the Russo-Japanese War, the Japan–Korea Treaty of 1905 was agreed in which Korea became a colony of Japan. Japanese officials increasingly controlled the national government but had little local presence, thereby allowing space for anti-Japanese activism by Korean nationalists. The new status failed because of a combination of diverse economic, historical, and emotional factors. Japan underestimated Korean nationalism and the hostility with which Koreans reacted against the modernizing programs which Japan was introducing.

Emperor Gojong, who did not accept the conclusion of this Treaty, dispatched secret envoys to the second Hague Peace Conference in 1907 in order to denounce the conclusion of the treaty as compulsive and invalid, but no nation supported the envoys. In July, 1907, Japan imposed the Japan–Korea Treaty of 1907 to gain full control of domestic affairs in Korea. It disbanded the army of the Korean Empire. Itō Hirobumi took full control of Korea as Resident-General of Korea. In 1909, Ito Hirobumi was assassinated by An Jung-geun. The assassination of Prince Ito by Korean nationalists brought the protectorate to an end and led to outright annexation. On August 22, 1910, Japan officially annexed the Korean Empire by imposing the Japan-Korea Annexation Treaty. One result of the protectorate was to demonstrate to the world that Japan was the strongest single power in the Far East. There was no significant opposition by any of the major powers.

=== Korea under Japanese rule ===
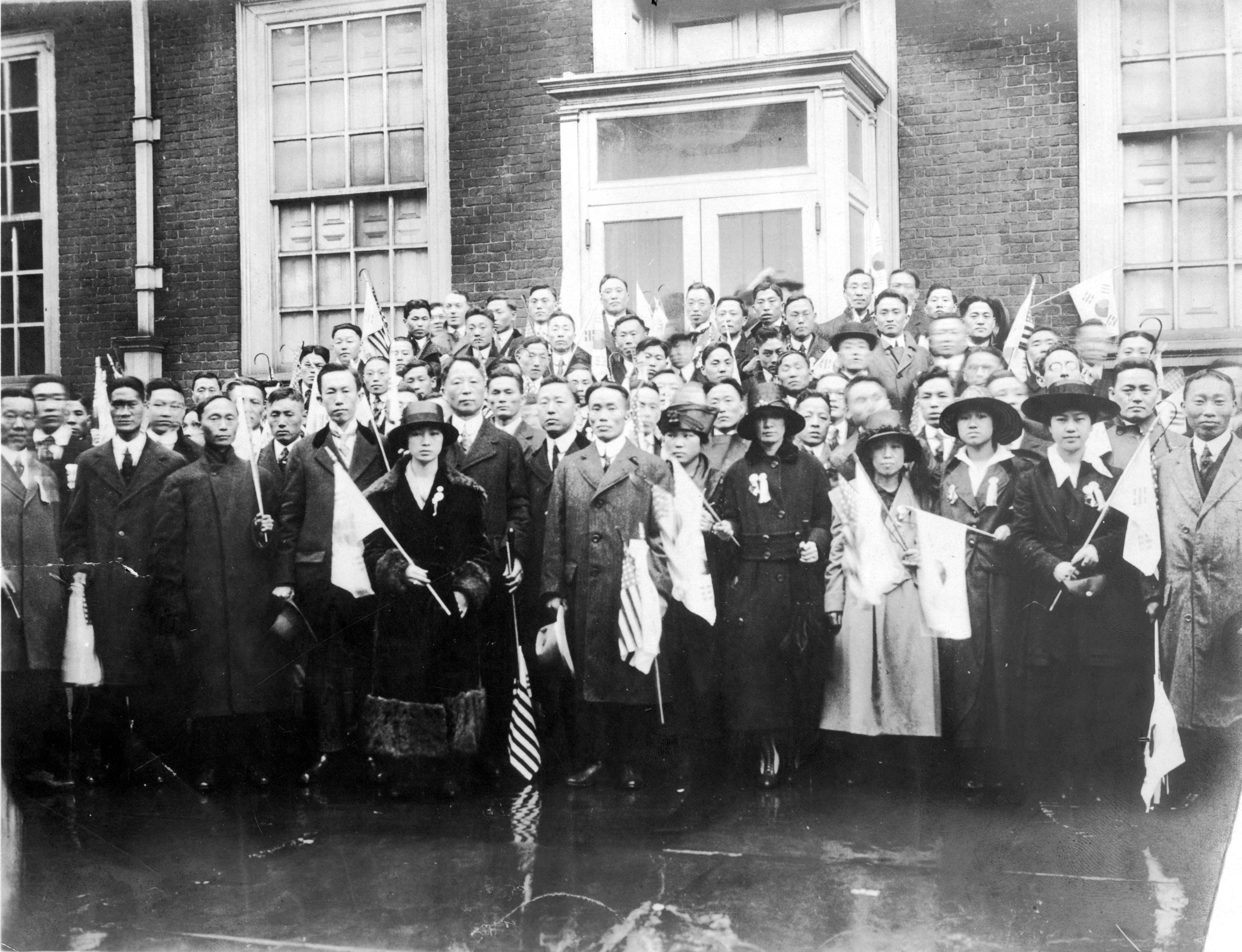
Members of the First Korean Congress in Philadelphia, 1919, who campaigned for Korean independence

During the colonial and annexation period, more than 100,000 Koreans served in the Imperial Japanese Army. These Korean men's military service was both voluntary and forced. Many Korean women were also sent to the war frontlines as "comfort women" to serve the Imperial Japanese Army as prostitutes by the brokers, as were women from other areas of Empire of Japan rule, including Japanese women. Kim Il Sung led a Korean independence movement, which was active in the border areas of China and Russia, particularly in areas with considerable ethnic Korean populations. Kim Il Sung joined the Chinese Communist Party in 1931 and served in the Communist-led Northeast Anti-Japanese United Army. Kim Il Sung's most famous victory occurred at the Battle of Pochonbo in June 1937, when he led between 150 and 200 Korean and Chinese guerillas on a raid at the border town of Pochon County. His force managed to take the outnumbered Japanese garrison by surprise and managed to occupy the town for a few hours or a day. Japanese accounts primarily dispute the notion that Kim led the raid himself, instead suggesting that Choe Hyon led the raid instead. Kim founded North Korea, and his descendants have still not signed a peace treaty with Japan.

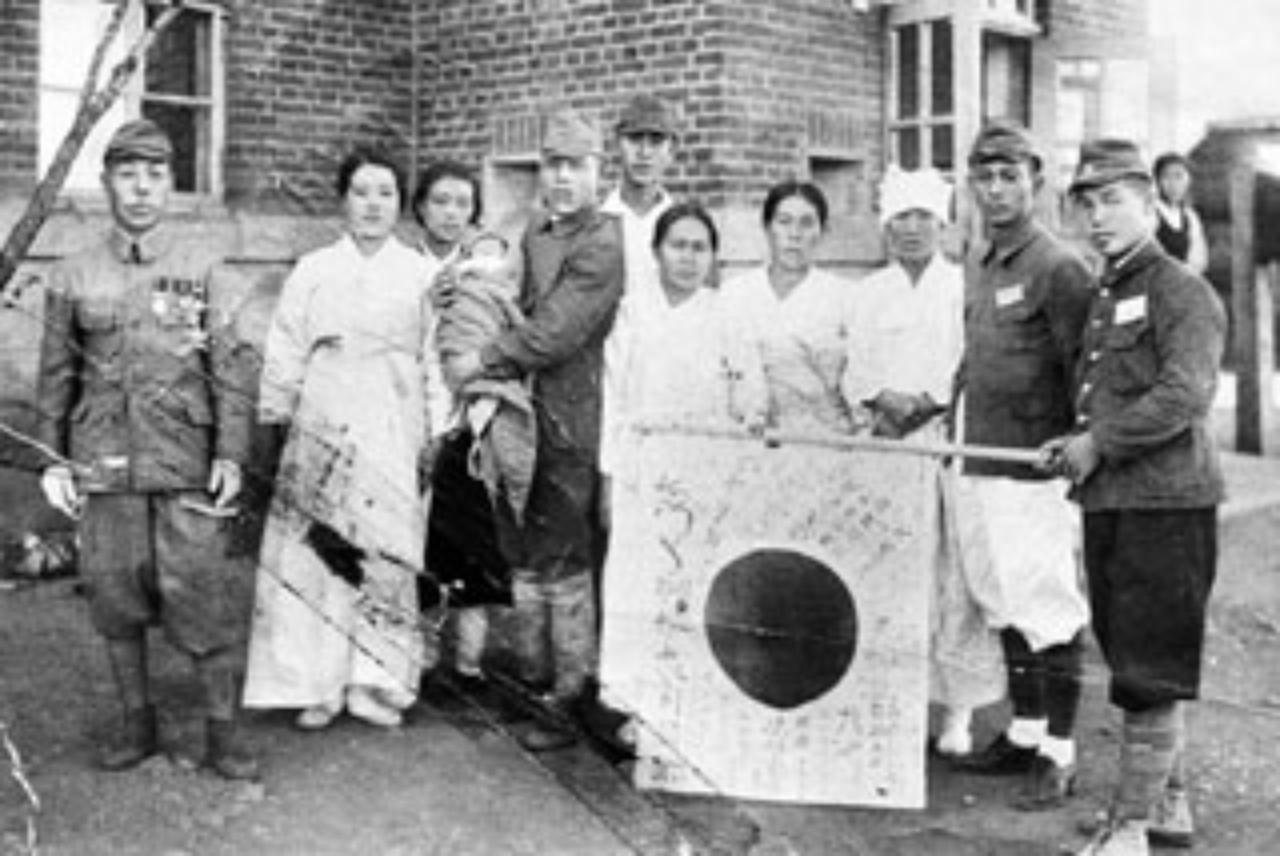
A young Korean conscript in the 1940s posing with his family while holding a Japanese flag.

The Provisional Government of the Republic of Korea, led by (later) South Korea's first president Syngman Rhee, moved from Shanghai to Chongqing. Lee lobbied in the United States and was recognized by the South Korean administrator by Douglas MacArthur. The Korean Provisional Government coordinated the armed resistance against the Japanese imperial army during the 1920s and 1930s, including the Battle of Fengwudong in June 1920, the Battle of Qingshanli in October 1920, and Yoon Bong-Gil's assassination of Japanese officers in Shanghai in April 1932. Korean independence activists often fled to China, Russia and the United States, where they fomented plans to restore Korean sovereignty. Several notable examples include the inclusion of Koreans into the Republic of China's Whampoa Military Academy, where many Koreans trained in military tactics and strategy. When Imperial Japan invaded China in 1937, sparking the Second Sino-Japanese War, the Provisional Government relocated to Chongqing and created the Korean Liberation Army to fight alongside Chinese forces against Japan.Originally, the Republic of China placed the Korean Liberation Army under the supreme authority of the commander-in-chief of the Chinese Army. The regulation was repealed in 1944, after the Provisional Government had improved its financial standing and achieved greater importance in the eyes of the Chinese government. The hundreds-strong KLA engaged in guerrilla warfare actions against the Japanese throughout the Asian theater of war until Japanese surrender in 1945. Japanese control of Korea ended on September 9, 1945, when the Japanese Governor-General of Korea signed the surrender document of the United States in Seoul.

=== Post World War II ===
At the end of World War II, Korea regained its independence after 35 years of imperialist Japanese rule. Per the Yalta Conference agreements, Soviet forces accepted surrender of Japanese forces in northern Korea above the 38th parallel, and U.S. forces south of that line. Korea was then divided into Soviet (North Korean) and U.S. (South Korean) spheres. South Korea refused diplomatic and trade relations with Japan, using tensions with Japan to rally support for the South Korean government. The early ROK (Republic of Korea; South Korea) government derived its legitimacy from its opposition to Japan and North Korea, portraying South Korea as under threat from the North and South. The diplomatic relationship between Japan and South Korea was established in 1965, when the Treaty on Basic Relations was signed; Japan subsequently recognized the Republic of Korea (the official name of South Korea) as the only legitimate government on the Korean Peninsula. As such, North Korea does not have official diplomatic ties with Japan.

== 21st century ==
Two Koreas and Japan

Despite the ongoing historical tension between Japan and Korea that has impacted their relations, they have since been able to interact with each other. In recent years, the two nations jointly hosted the 2002 FIFA World Cup, and (South) Korean pop culture experienced major popularity in Japan, a phenomenon dubbed the "Korean Wave" (韓流) in Japan. The Korean Wave has sparked a fad for Korean movies, dramas and popular music in Japan. In return, certain Japanese pop culture productions like anime, manga and video games gained significant popularity in South Korea.

Moreover, the PRC, ROK, and Japan have successfully entered the Regional Comprehensive Economic Partnership (RCEP) that was implemented on January 1, 2022. This agreement covers more than a quarter of the world's population, has been able to knock down tariffs, and promoted interregional trade. This momentous agreement enabled a series of talks to initiate the China-Japan-South Korea Free Trade Agreement (CJK FTA). Nevertheless, the implementation of the RCEP agreement that is indicative of the growing power of economic interdependence in global politics.

Other points of cooperation between the two states are written as follows: Both states work to counter the North Korean threat and their pursuit of trilateral relations with the United States. For example, in late September 2022, South Korea, the US, and Japan staged joint anti-submarine drills in response to a series of North Korean missile tests. Furthermore, in late October, South Korea, Japan, and the U.S. engaged in a discussion relating to North Korea and agreed that if North Korea resumed nuclear testing, they would have to respond.

Despite increased cultural exchange, political tensions remain. The stain of Japan's colonial rule has not yet been washed away. This is evidenced by the outrage that erupted when former Japanese Prime Minister Junichiro Koizumi visited the Yasukuni Shrine annually from 2001 to 2006. The Shrine is dedicated to deceased Japanese soldiers, some of which participated in war crimes and atrocities in Korea. Thus, when Japanese government leaders pay homage to the deceased at the Yasukuni Shrine, South Koreans see this to symbolize Japan's lack of remorse for its colonization of Korea. So, as a result of Koizumi's visits, the South Korean public protested heavily against a summit meeting scheduled between the eccentric Japanese diplomat and South Korean president Kim Dae-Jung. The South Korean government responded to the protests and canceled the summit.

Another source of tension is the differing views of the two countries regarding China. China has become a bigger security priority for Japan, mainly because of China's rising assertiveness about its claims to the Senkaku (Diaoyutai) Islands, which are currently under Japanese rule. On the other hand, South Korea does not have territorial disputes with China and does not see it as a military threat. From a strategic point of view, South Korea is actually looking to improve relations with China because it is a powerful economic ally and one of the best sources of leverage South Korea could get over North Korea. Japan thinks that South Korea is prioritizing its relationship with China over its relationship with Japan, which frustrates Japan because it wants to enlist the help of East Asian democracies like South Korea in balancing China.

In 2015, relations between the two nations reached a high point when South Korea and Japan addressed the issue of comfort women, used by the Japanese military during World War II. Fumio Kishida, the Japanese Foreign Minister, pledged that the Japanese government would donate 1 billion yen (US$8.3 million, 2015) to help pay for the care of the surviving former comfort women. Furthermore, Japanese Prime Minister, Shinzō Abe, made public apologies to the "women who underwent immeasurable and painful experiences and suffered incurable physical and psychological wounds as comfort women". The agreement was firstly welcomed by the majority of the former comfort women (36 out of 47 existed former comfort women at that time) and the payment was received by them. However, Moon Jae-in utilized the criticism against the agreement for his presidential election supported by an activist group, the Korean Council for the Women Drafted for Military Sexual Slavery by Japan, which criticized the agreement and persuaded the women to deny the payment.

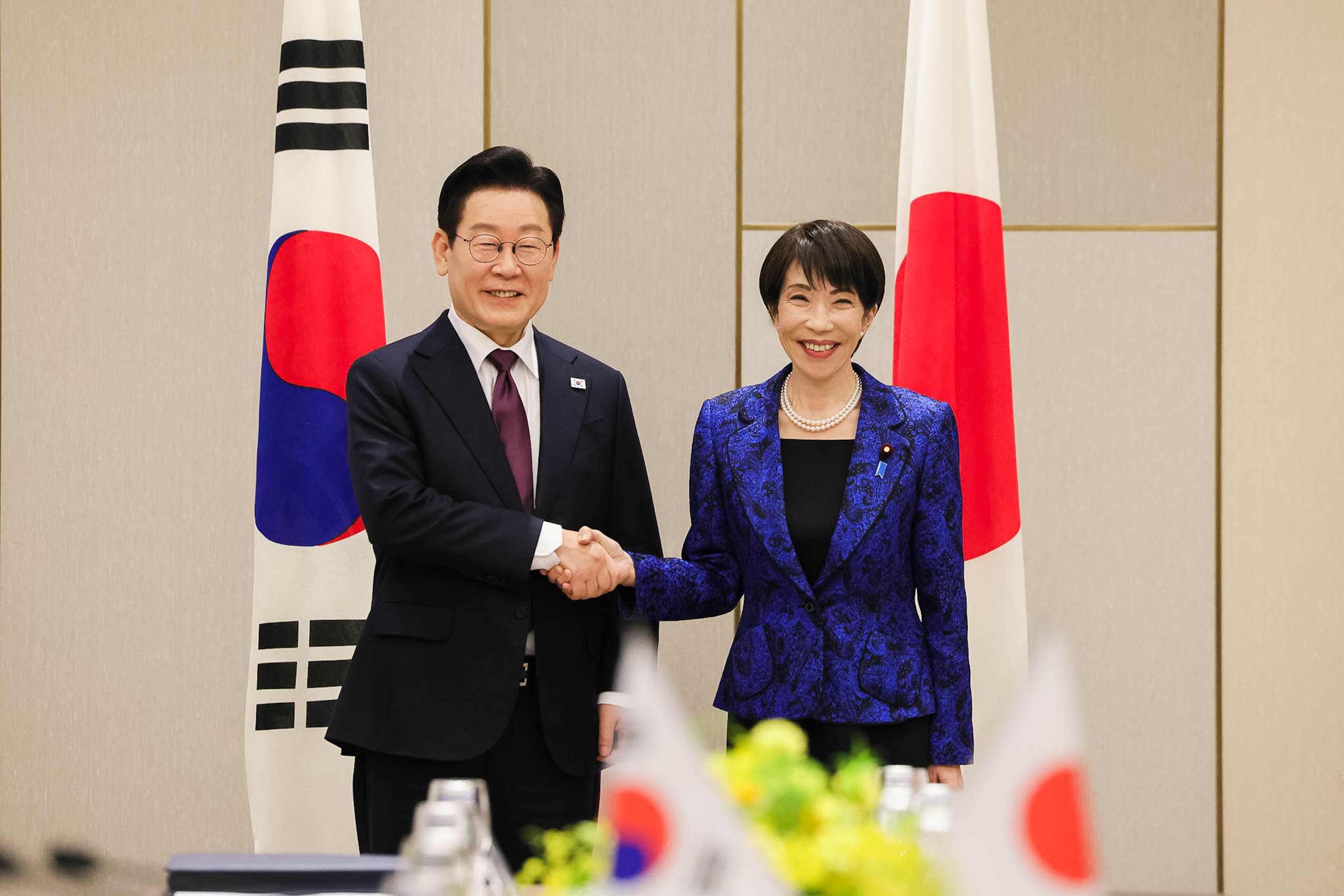
South Korean President Lee Jae-myung (left) and Japanese Prime Minister Sanae Takaichi in Nara, Japan, January 2026

Moon and the activists argued that the former South Korean president, Park Geun-hye, without any communication with the surviving "comfort women", hailed this deal as a sign of positive progression in Japanese and South Korean relations. At the time of this high point most of Japan's cabinet members visited the Yasukuni shrine, causing confusion in Korea about Japan's sincerity.

In the wake of the 2018 Japan–South Korea radar lock-on dispute, Japan became increasingly suspicious that South Korea had leaked hydrogen fluoride to countries subject to UN sanctions, including North Korea. In 2019 Japan imposed controls on the export of semiconductor materials, restricting export to South Korea and removing the country from its "preferred trading nations" list. Experts have said the controls may be retaliation after South Korean courts ruled that Japanese companies pay restitution for Korean forced laborers during World War II.

On 18 August 2023, Japan signed a trilateral pact with South Korea and the United States.

== See also ==
- Foreign relations of Japan
- Foreign relations of North Korea
  - Japan–North Korea relations
- Foreign relations of South Korea
  - Japan–South Korea relations
  - Treaty on Basic Relations between South Korea and Japan
- Japan–Korea disputes
- Japan-Korea Undersea Tunnel
- Japan-South Korea (ROK) Joint History Research Project
- Korea under Japanese rule
  - Anti-Japanese sentiment in Korea
  - Anti-Korean sentiment in Japan
- Korean influence on Japanese culture
- Koreans in Japan
