= Iljinhoe =

1904–1910 Korean political organization

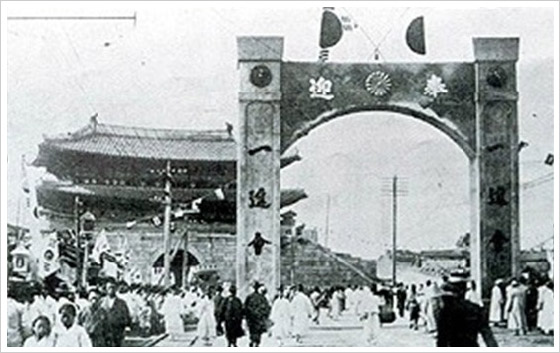
- The Ilchinhoe Arch, erected to welcome the Japanese crown prince Yoshihito (later the emperor Taishō) on his visit to Korea in October 1907. The Japanese protectorate organized large ceremonies for receiving Yoshihito, and the Korean emperor Sunjong went to Inch'ŏn to greet him upon his arrival from Japan. Photograph courtesy of Chungang Ilbo.

Korean name
- Hangul: 일진회
- Hanja: 一進會
- RR: Iljinhoe
- MR: Ilchinhoe

The Iljinhoe (Korean: 일진회; Hanja: 一進會) was a nationwide organization in Korea formed on August 8, 1904.

The Ilchinhoe (Advance in Unity Society) was a group of reformers from diverse social backgrounds that adopted Japan’s discourse of “civilizing Korea” and viewed colonization as an opportunity to advance their own populist goals. Its members described themselves as “representatives of the people” and organized popular movements that claimed to protect people’s freedom, property, and lives.

The Ilchinhoe participated in disruptive activities such as tax resistance, which were performed in service of "protecting the people's life and property".

Rather than aligning clearly with either modernist or traditionalist positions, they were willing to support changes that weakened the sovereignty of the Korean monarchy if they believed those changes would promote rights and equality for the population.

Both Japanese authorities and Korean elites opposed the Ilchinhoe for its assertive activism, particularly its efforts to influence local tax administration and challenge existing power relations between the population and government officials. Over time, many Koreans came to view the Ilchinhoe critically, as its rhetoric and actions were seen to contribute to the consolidation of Japanese colonial rule in Korea.

A Japanese record states the number of party members was about 800,000, but another survey record by the Japanese Resident-General of Korea in 1910 shows the number was about 90,000. After seeing the failure of Korea's isolationism, the party claimed that Korea could not develop capitalism on its own, and demanded a merger with the Empire of Japan. Song Byeong-jun (송병준), the leader of the group and a high-ranking official in the Korean government before the Japan-Korea Annexation Treaty actively pushed ahead the annexation and received a title of nobility from the Japanese government in 1920. The group was disbanded on September 26, 1910, a month after the Japan-Korea Annexation Treaty. Song Byeong-jun is considered a traitor in modern day Korea.

In 2006, a South Korean presidential committee announced the names of 120 people suspected of collaborating with Japan during its annexation rule of Korea. The list included 27 members of Iljinhoe, all of whom allegedly took the lead in suppressing Korean troops and supporting Japan-Korea annexation. The people on the list will face investigation on suspicion of conducting traitorous pro-Japanese activities during the 1904–1919 period, although no prosecutions will take place as the people implicated have long since died.

== See also ==
- Chinilpa
- Japan-Korea Annexation Treaty
- Korea under Japanese rule
