= Song Pyŏngjun =

Korean politician (1857–1925)

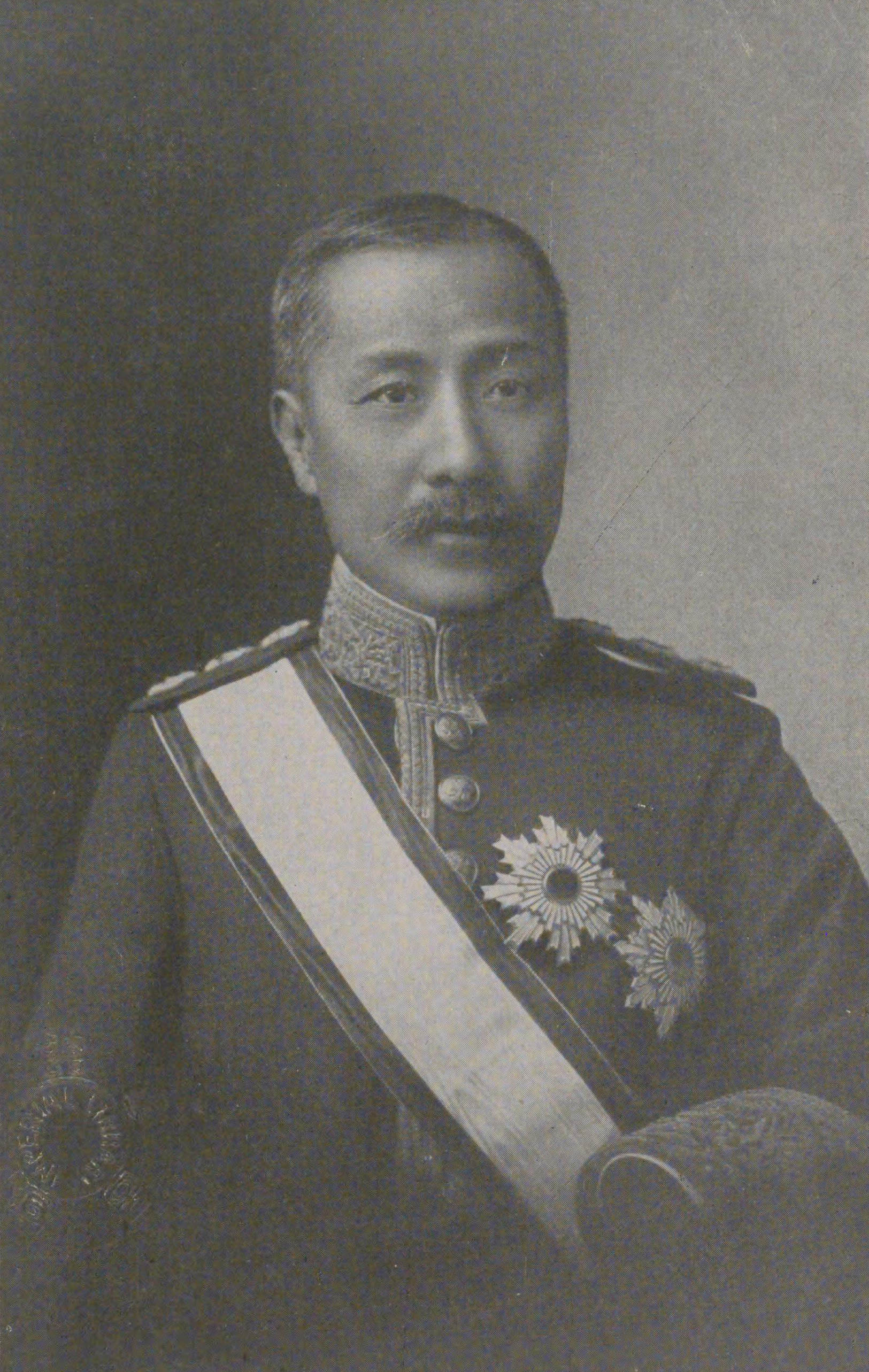
- Song Pyŏngjun in 1910
- Born: August 20, 1857; Changjin County, Hamgyong Province, Joseon
- Died: February 1, 1925 (aged 67); Keijō, Korea, Empire of Japan
- Other names: Noda Heijiro; Jeam
- Occupation: Politician

Korean name
- Hangul: 송병준
- Hanja: 宋秉畯
- RR: Song Byeongjun
- MR: Song Pyŏngjun

Art name
- Hangul: 제암
- Hanja: 濟庵
- RR: Jeam
- MR: Cheam

Song Pyŏngjun (Korean: 송병준; Hanja: 宋秉畯; August 20, 1857 – February 1, 1925) was a Korean politician. He is remembered for his role in signing the Japan–Korea Treaty of 1910. His clan was the Eunjin Song clan. His art name was Cheam (제암; 濟庵).

== Biography ==
Song was born in Changjin County, Hamgyong Province, Joseon (now in North Korea). He was an eighth-generation descendant of the famous Neo-confucian philosopher Song Si-yeol, albeit from an illegitimate line as his mother was a kisaeng. Despite the handicap of his birth, he passed the gwageo in 1871 and obtained a post at the Board of Examination in 1873. Following the failure of the Gapsin Coup of 1884, he went to Japan intending to assassinate Enlightenment Party leader Kim Ok-gyun, but was instead won over to the pro-reform movement by Kim and his followers. On his return to Korea, Song was arrested on suspicion of collaboration with the Enlightenment Party, and although soon released, he continue to face ongoing official harassment, and returned to Japan again, where he adopted the Japanese name of Noda Heijiro (野田 平次郞).

Song returned to Korea in 1904 as an interpreter for the Imperial Japanese Army during the Russo-Japanese War. He was one of the founders of the Iljinhoe, a pro-Japanese political society promoting the merger of Korea and Japan, and which was instrumental in bringing about the Japan–Korea Treaty of 1910. From 1907, he served as Minister of Agriculture, Commerce and Industry in the last cabinet of Emperor Gojong. Following the annexation of Korea, Song was awarded the Japanese kazoku peerage title of viscount (shishaku) and a seat in the House of Peers of the Diet of Japan. He later served on the Central Advisory Institute of the Government-General of Korea, and his title was subsequently raised to count (hakushaku).

Under the Special law to redeem pro-Japanese collaborators' property enacted in 2005, property of the descendants of nine people who had collaborated when Korea was annexed by Japan, including Song Pyŏngjun, was confiscated by the South Korean government.

== Honours ==
Korean Empire

- Order of the Taegeuk 1st Class on 25 October 1907
