= Japan–South Korea Joint History Research Project =

At the Japan-ROK Summit Meeting held in October 2001, then Prime Minister Junichiro Koizumi and then President Kim Dae Jung agreed on creating a team of experts regarding Japan and Korea's relationship in history. In May 2002, Japan and South Korea brought together expert historians from both nations in order to "promoting mutual understanding concerning accurate facts and recognition of history." Initially, multiple experts from each country would compile and translate multiple sources for validity and accuracy. "The experts of Japan and the ROK have conducted joint research through a number of period-specific working groups: ancient history, medieval and modern history, and modern and contemporary history."

As the research progressed multiple disagreements were slowly being resolved toward accurate facts by both historians. Two very important points one of which was resolved was 4th century Japanese history and modern history.

== Resolved 4th century ==
Both Japan and South Korea agreed that Japan's interpretation of the 4th century was incorrect. The term Imna Japanese Headquarters never used in the 4th century. The Korea-Japan Joint History Research Committee failed to establish common interpretations of several sensitive historical events. However, both sides agreed that a disputed Japanese government office said to have been established in the sixth century exist, but the name is not Imna Japanese Headquarters (ja:任那日本府 in Japan). Even though expert historians from both nations agreed on the accuracy of this data, they could not require Japanese history text books to use the correct information. "Cho Kwang, the Korean head of the research committee, said it will ask the Japanese government to request that textbook publishers remove sections about the Imna headquarters. But the historians’ recommendations cannot be enforced, as they are not legally binding." This conclusion, has huge implications on the Kofun period for Japan as well in addition to the Gosashi tomb.

== Temporary Halting of the research project ==
In 2005, the project was halted due to the Japanese government's refusal to use the research in Japanese school text books. "After conducting research for three years since 2002, scholars of the two countries announced their first report on three categories - ancient, medieval, and modern times. At that time, Seoul demanded that the research institute’s findings be reflected in the textbooks of the two nations, but Japan rejected this request." Japan's refusal to use the research findings of the joint historians in Japanese schools cause South Korea to wonder why they were spending so much money researching history which wasn't going to be used in Japan. This event caused South Korea to halt the project in 2005.

== Revival of the Joint research project ==
In 2007, both nations decided to revive the joint history project and further research is still under way. Whether Japan and South Korea will be able to resolve their differences still remains to be seen. The current disputes on the project are mainly about interpretations of Japan's occupation of Korea and World War II. "The committee's final report Tuesday from a second round of the joint study underscored the deep gaps over how the countries view their recent history and what should or should not be included in their textbooks."
