= Special Law to Redeem Pro-Japanese Collaborators' Property =

2005 South Korean law

The Special Law to Redeem Pro-Japanese Collaborators' Property (Korean: 친일반민족행위자 재산의 국가귀속에 관한 특별법) is a policy passed by the South Korean National Assembly on December 8, 2005, and enacted on December 29, 2005. Under this law, the South Korean government is able to seize land and other properties owned by Korean collaborators (chinilpa) and their descendants who collaborated with the Empire of Japan during Japan's takeover and annexation of the country. The bill defines as collaborators people who took part in Japan’s annexation of Korea in 1910, received titles from the Japanese colonial government, or served as parliamentarians in Japanese Korea. The confiscated assets are allegedly used to compensate pro-independence activists and their offspring.

== See also ==
- Roh Moo-hyun
- Uri Party
- Chinilpa - a Korean term for colonial-era collaborators with Japan
- Anti-Japanese sentiment in Korea
