= Chūseinan Province =

1910–1945 province of Korea under Japan

Chūsei-nan Province 忠清南道
- Former province of Korea, Empire of Japan
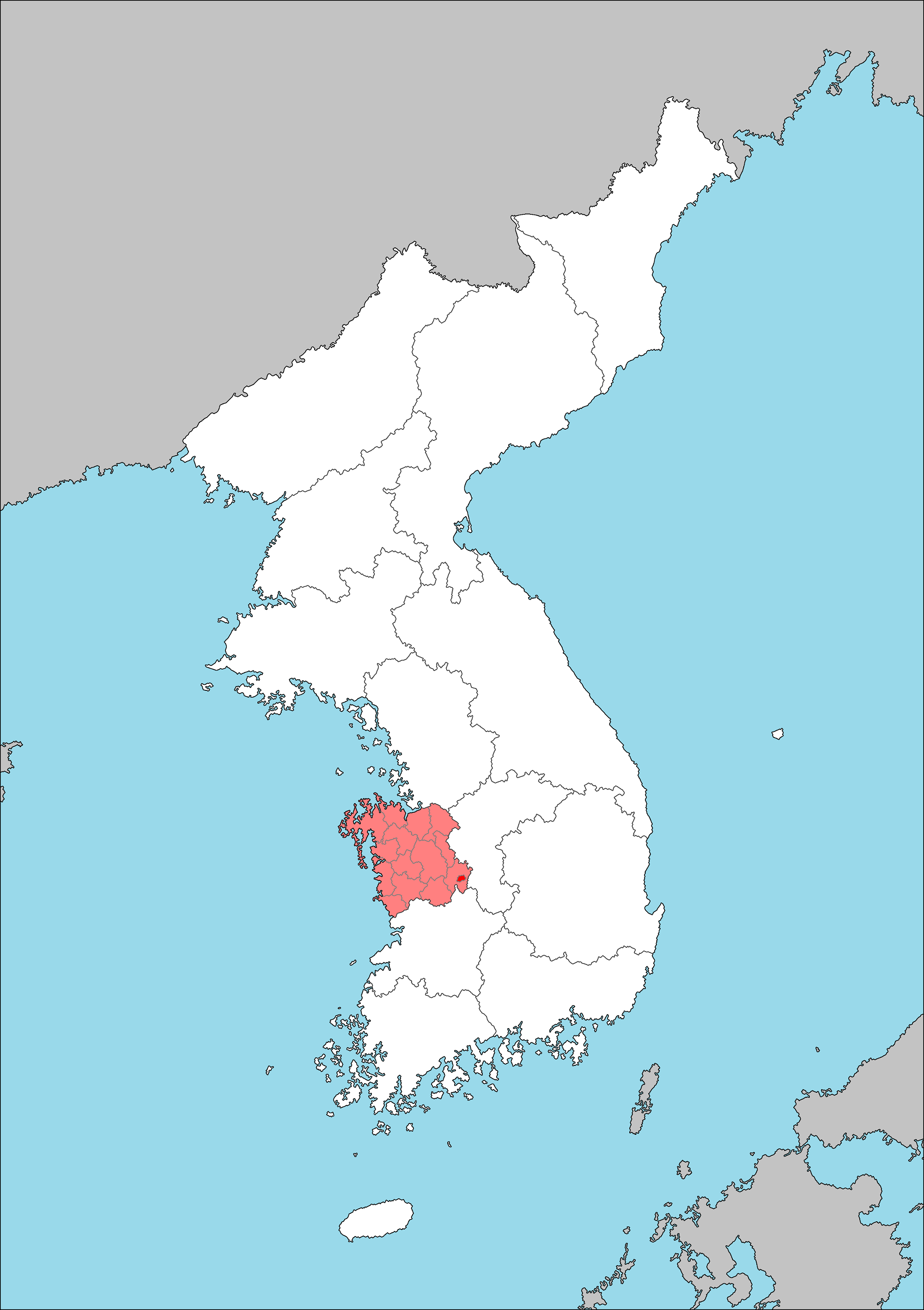
- Capital: Taiden
- Today part of: South Korea

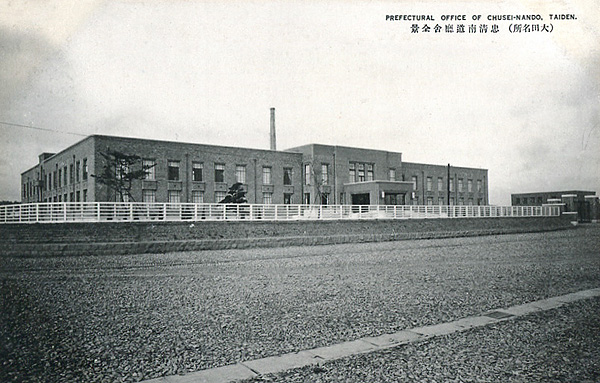
Chūsei-nan Provincial Office

Chūseinan-dō (忠清南道; Korean: 충청남도), alternatively Chūseinan Province or South Chūsei Province, was a province of Korea under Japanese rule. Its capital was at Taiden (Daejeon). The province consisted of modern-day South Chungcheong, South Korea.

== Population ==
Year	Population
1925	1,259,024
1930	1,356,942
1940	1,548,032
1944	1,647,044

Number of people by nationality according to the 1936 census:

- Overall population: 1,482,963 people
  - Japanese: 26,314 people
  - Koreans: 1,454,830 people
  - Other: 1,819 people

== Administrative divisions ==
The following list is based on the administrative divisions of 1945:

=== Cities ===
Emblem of Taiden

- Taiden (大田) - (capital): Daejeon (대전). present Daejeon Metropolitan City.

=== Counties ===
- Daitoku (大德): Daedeok (대덕). present Daedeok District and Yuseong District in Daejeon Metropolitan City.
- Enki (燕岐): Yeongi (연기). present Sejong City.
- Kōshū (公州): Gongju (공주).
- Ronzan (論山): Nonsan (논산).
- Fuyo (扶餘): Buyeo (부여).
- Josen (舒川): Seocheon (서천).
- Honei (保寧): Boryeong (보령).
- Seiyō (靑陽): Cheongyang (청양).
- Kōjō (洪城): Hongseong (홍성).
- Reizan (禮山): Yesan (예산).
- Zuizan (瑞山): Seosan (서산).
- Tōshin (唐津): Dangjin (당진).
- Gazan (牙山): Asan (아산).
- Ten'an (天安): Cheonan (천안).

== Provincial governors ==
The following people were provincial ministers before August 1919. This was then changed to the title of governor.

Ethnicity	Name	Name in kanji/hanja	Start of tenure	End of tenure	Notes
Korean	Park Jung-yang	朴 重陽	October 1, 1910	March 31, 1915	Provincial minister
Japanese	Ohara Shinzō	小原 新三	March 31, 1915	October 28, 1916	Provincial minister
Japanese	Kanbayashi Keijirō	上林 敬次郎	October 28, 1916	September 23, 1918	Provincial minister
Japanese	Kuwahara Hachishi	桑原 八司	September 23, 1918	September 26, 1919	Provincial minister before August 1919
Japanese	Tokizane Akiho	時実 秋穂	September 26, 1919	February 12, 1921	
Korean	Kim Gwan-hyeon	金 寬鉉	February 12, 1921	December 1, 1924	
Korean	Seok Jin-hyeong	石 鎭衡	December 1, 1924	August 14, 1926	
Korean	Yoo Seong-jun	兪 星濬	August 14, 1926	May 18, 1927	
Korean	Sin Seok-rin	申 錫麟	May 18, 1927	November 28, 1929	
Korean	Yoo Jin-sun	劉 鎭淳	November 28, 1929	September 23, 1931	
Japanese	Okazaki Tetsurō	岡崎 哲郎	September 23, 1931	April 1, 1935	
Korean	Lee Beom-ik	李 範益	April 1, 1935	February 20, 1937	
Korean	Jeong Kyo-won	鄭 僑源	February 20, 1937	May 17, 1939	
Korean	Lee Seong-geun	李 聖根	May 17, 1939	May 31, 1941	
Korean	Matsumura Motohiro	松村 基弘	May 31, 1941	October 23, 1942	Had been forced to change name from Lee Gi-bang (李基枋)
Korean	Yamaki Fuminori	山木 文憲	October 23, 1942	June 26, 1945	Had been forced to change name from Song Mun-hyeon (宋文憲)
Korean	Masunaga Hiroshi	増永 弘	June 26, 1945	August 15, 1945	Had been forced to change name from Park Jae-hong (朴在弘), Korean independence

== See also ==
- South Chungcheong Province
- Provinces of Korea
- Governor-General of Chōsen
- Administrative divisions of Korea
