= Special Investigation Committee of Anti-National Activities =

1948–1949 Korean investigation

- 반민족행위특별조사위원회
- Abbreviation: 반민특위
- Formation: 22 October 1948
- Founder: Constituent National Assembly
- Dissolved: October 1949; 76 years ago
- Purpose: To purge pro-Japanese individuals and organizations
- Region served: South Korea
- Official language: Korean
- Chairman: Kim Sang-deok

- Special Investigation Committee of Anti-National Activities
- Hangul: 반민족행위특별조사위원회
- Hanja: 反民族行爲特別調査委員會
- RR: Banminjok haengwi teukbyeol josa wiwonhoe
- MR: Panminjok haengwi t'ŭkpyŏl chosa wiwŏnhoe

The Special Investigation Committee of Anti-National Activities (Korean: 반민족행위특별조사위원회; abbreviated 반민특위) was established by the Constituent National Assembly to investigate those who actively cooperated with the Japanese Empire during the Japanese colonial period and conducted viciously anti-ethnic acts. There is one special committee.

The Constituent Assembly passed the Anti-People of Punishment Act on 7 September 1948, to punish those who actively cooperated in the robbery of sovereignty, independence activists under Japanese imperialism, or those who violently killed or persecuted their families. The anti-communist clouded the national period by using the special police station under its ambition, arresting Park Heung-sik, a bad entrepreneur of the Japanese colonial era, and Choi Nam-sun and Yi Gwangsu, who defended the Japanese people and brought them to the battlefield. Many of the pro-Japanese students who had been found were searched.

Due to the systematic disturbance of the Syngman Rhee regime, which used the pro-Japanese factions after the liberation, the activities of the anti-citizens were sluggish, and on 6 June 1949, the Special Police Forces were forced to disband. The parliamentary midterm will shorten special periods.
