= Chūseihoku Province =

1910–1945 province of Korea under Japan

Chūseihoku-dō 忠清北道
- Former province of Korea, Empire of Japan
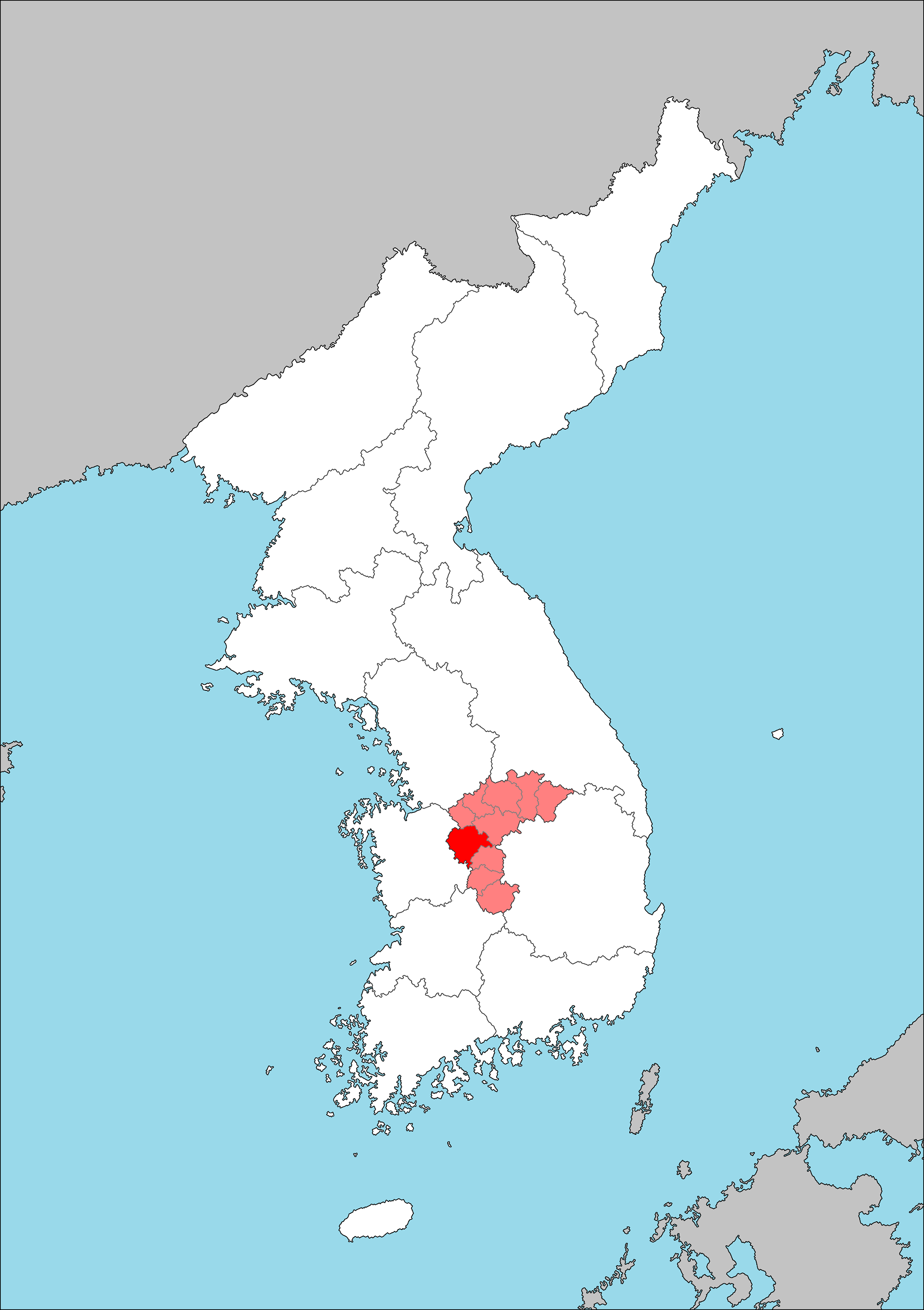
- Capital: Seishū
- Today part of: South Korea

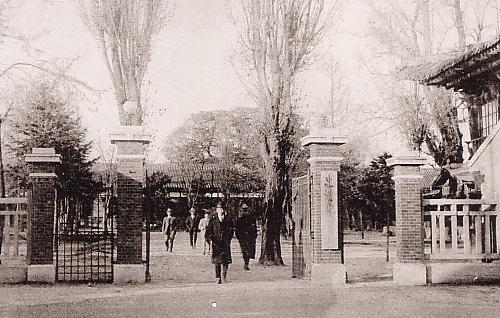
Chūsei-hoku Provincial Office

Chūseihoku-dō (忠清北道, Korean: 충청북도), alternatively Chūseihoku Province, Chūsei Hoku, or North Chūsei Province, was a province of Korea under Japanese rule. Its capital was at Seishū (contemporary Cheongju, South Korea). The prefecture consisted of what is now the South Korean province of North Chungcheong.

== Population ==
Year	Population
1925	839,422
1930	890,877
1940	935,111
1944	970,623

Number of people by nationality according to the 1936 census:

- Overall population: 907,055 people
  - Japanese: 8,598 people
  - Koreans: 897,736 people
  - Other: 721 people

== Administrative divisions ==
The following list is based on the administrative divisions of 1945:

=== Counties ===
- Seishū (淸州) - (capital): Cheongju (청주).
- Hōon (報恩): Boeun (보은).
- Yokusen (沃川): Okcheon (옥천).
- Eidō (永同): Yeongdong (영동).
- Chinsen (鎭川): Jincheon (진천).
- Kaizan (槐山): Goesan (괴산).
- Injō (陰城): Eumseong (음성).
- Chūshū (忠州): Chungju (충주).
- Teisen (堤川): Jecheon (제천).
- Tan'yō (丹陽): Danyang (단양).

== Provincial governors ==
The following people were provincial ministers before August 1919. This was then changed to the title of governor.

Nationality	Name	Name in kanji/hanja	Start of tenure	End of tenure	Notes
Japanese	Suzuki Takashi	鈴木 隆	October 1, 1910	March 28, 1916	Provincial minister
Korean	Yoo Hyeok-no	柳赫魯	March 28, 1916	June 13, 1917	Provincial minister
Korean	Jang Heon-sik	張憲植	June 13, 1917	February 12, 1921	Provincial minister before August 1919
Japanese	Yoneda Jintarō	米田 甚太郎	February 12, 1921	February 24, 1923	
Korean	Park Jung-yang	朴重陽	February 24, 1923	March 31, 1925	
Korean	Kim Yoon-jeong	金潤晶	March 31, 1925	August 14, 1926	
Korean	Han Kyu-bok	韓圭復	August 14, 1926	November 28, 1929	
Korean	Hong Seung-gyun	洪承均	November 28, 1929	September 23, 1931	
Korean	Nam Gung-yeong	南宮營	September 23, 1931	April 1, 1935	
Korean	Kim Dong-hun	金東勳	April 1, 1935	April 26, 1939	
Korean	Yoo Man-gyeom	兪萬兼	April 26, 1939	September 2, 1940	
Korean	Itō Yasuakira	伊藤 泰彬	September 2, 1940	October 23, 1942	Had been forced to change name from Yoon Tae-bin (尹泰彬)
Korean	Hiramatsu Shōkon	平松 昌根	October 23, 1942	August 17, 1944	Had been forced to change name from Lee Chang-geun (李昌根)
Korean	Masunaga Hiroshi	増永 弘	August 17, 1944	June 16, 1945	Had been forced to change name from Park Jae-hong (朴在弘)
Korean	Jeong Kyo-won	鄭僑源	June 16, 1945	August 15, 1945	Term ended with Korean independence

== See also ==
- North Chungcheong Province
- Provinces of Korea
- Governor-General of Chōsen
- Administrative divisions of Korea
