= Japan–Korea Treaty of 1910 =

1910 formal annexation of Korea by Japan

Japan–Korea Unequal Treaty
Japan–Korea Annexation Treaty of 1910
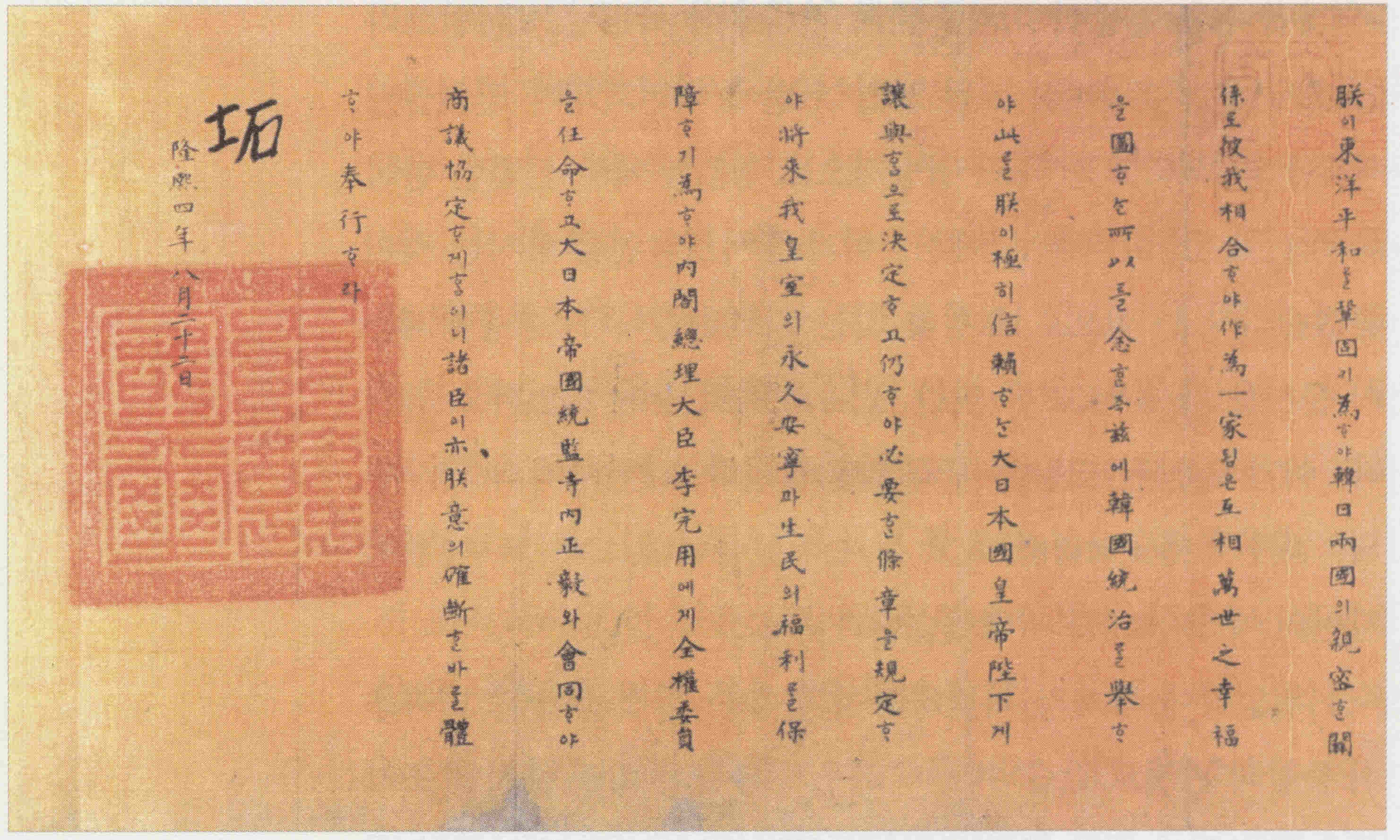
- General power of attorney to Yi Wan-yong signed and sealed by the last emperor, Sunjong of the Korean Empire (Yi Cheok, 이척 李坧). The last emperor's first name '坧' used as signature.
- Type: Annexation treaty
- Context: Annexation of the Korean Empire by the Empire of Japan
- Sealed: August 22, 1910
- Effective: August 29, 1910
- Expiration: August 15, 1945, de facto September 2, 1945
- Expiry: June 22, 1965
- Signatories: Ye Wanyong (Prime Minister of the Korean Empire); Count Terauchi Masatake (Resident General of Korea; Empire of Japan)
- Parties: Japan; Korea
- Ratifiers: Japan; Korea
- Language: Literary Chinese

Japan-Korea Annexation Treaty

Japanese name
- Kanji: 韓国併合ニ関スル条約 or 日韓併合条約
- Hiragana: かんこくへいごうにかんするじょうやく or にっかんへいごうじょうやく
Transcriptions
- Romanization: Kankoku heigō ni kansuru jōyaku or Nikkan heigō jōyaku

Korean name
- Hangul: 한일병합조약 (한일합방조약, 한일합방늑약)
- Hanja: 韓日倂合條約 (韓日合邦條約, 韓日合邦勒約)
Transcriptions
- Revised Romanization: Hanil Byeonghap Joyak (Hanil Hapbang Joyak, Hanil Hapbang Neugyak)

The Japan–Korea Treaty of 1910, also known as the Japan–Korea Annexation Treaty (Korean: 한일병합조약), was made by representatives of the Empire of Japan and the Korean Empire on 22 August 1910. In this treaty, Japan formally annexed Korea following the Japan–Korea Treaty of 1905 (by which Korea became a protectorate of Japan) and the Japan–Korea Treaty of 1907 (by which Korea was deprived of the administration of internal affairs).

Japanese commentators predicted that Koreans would easily assimilate into the Japanese Empire.

In 1965, the Treaty of Basic Relations between South Korea and Japan confirmed this treaty is "already null and void".

== History ==
The treaty was proclaimed to the public (and became effective) on 29 August 1910, officially starting the period of Japanese rule in Korea. The treaty had eight articles, the first being: "His Majesty the Emperor of Korea makes the complete and permanent cession to His Majesty the Emperor of Japan of all rights of sovereignty over the whole of Korea".

Gojong of the Korean Empire later called the treaty a neugyak (늑약 勒約, Forced treaty). This alternative term used in lieu of joyak (조약 條約, Treaty) implies the Koreans were coerced into accepting the treaty by the Japanese. Terms such as Gyeongsul Gukchi (경술국치 庚戌國恥, National humiliation of the year of Gyeongsul) and Gukchi-il (국치일 國恥日, National humiliation day) are also used in Korea to refer to the year and date of the treaty's proclamation.

== Japanese annexation of Korea ==
The Empire of Japan had already confirmed the policy of Annexation at the Cabinet Meeting on 6 July 1909. However, it was left only to minimize side effects and obtain an international justification. The Japanese imperial government was preparing a scenario for a "merger petition" to Shigemaru Sugiyama, an advisor of the Iljinhoe. Prior to this, Song Byeong-jun went to the Empire of Japan in February 1909 and held a bargaining for the country. Many times, Itō Hirobumi urged a "merger", but when work was delayed due to the Japanese imperial armed forces' plan, he went directly to the Empire of Japan and negotiated a "merger" against the Japanese imperial Prime Minister Katsura Tarō and other members of the Japanese imperial Choya.

If Song Byeong-jun's cabinet is established, not only is there a risk of retaliation, but also Ye Wanyong, fearing that the main role of the annexation will be taken away, said, "Even if the current cabinet collapses, a more pro-Japanese cabinet cannot come out." and voluntarily informed the Ministry of Knowledge Economy that it was possible.

In directing such a scenario, the Empire of Japan gradually decided that the period of “Annexation” was ripening, and promoted Shigemaru to make a “joining petition” using Lee Yong-gu and Song Byeong-jun.

== Legality ==
The legality of the treaty was later disputed by the exiled Provisional Government of the Republic of Korea, as well as the South Korean government. While the treaty was affixed with the national seal of the Korean Empire, Emperor Sunjong of Korea refused to sign the treaty as required under Korean law. The treaty was instead signed by Prime Minister Ye Wanyong of the Korean Empire, and Resident General Count Terauchi Masatake of the Empire of Japan.

This issue caused considerable difficulty in the negotiations for the establishment of basic diplomatic relations between Japan and South Korea in 1965. The South Korean government held the position that the annexation treaty was null and void at the time of signing, which the Japanese government contested. A compromise was reached in Article II of the 1965 Treaty on Basic Relations:

"It is confirmed that all treaties or agreements concluded between the Empire of Japan and the Empire of Korea on or before August 22, 1910, are already null and void."

=== Conference to discuss legality of the treaty ===
In January, April, and November 2001, an academic conference on the legality of Japan's annexation of Korea from 1910 to 1945 (titled A Reconsideration of Japanese Annexation of Korea from the Historical and International Law Perspectives) was held at Harvard University with the support of the Korea Foundation. Scholars of history and international law participated from South Korea, North Korea, Japan, the United States, the United Kingdom, Germany, and Canada.

Anthony Carty, a professor at the University of Derby, stated, "During the height of the imperialism, it is difficult to find an international law sufficient to determine the legality/illegality of a particular treaty." According to the Asian Yearbook of International Law, in his book on international law, "Carty prefers seeing the relationship between Japan and Korea at the time with reference to the reality of the then international community dominated by Western powers, rather than viewing it in terms of treaty law as argued by Korean scholars".

Alexis Dudden, a professor at the University of Connecticut, discussed Nitobe Inazō's science of colonial policy. She is the author of Japan's Colonization of Korea: Discourse and Power in which she discusses how Japanese policymakers carefully studied and then invoked international law to annex Korea legally.

According to Kan Kimura, a major result of this conference is that the Korean claim that the annexation was illegal was rejected by the participating Western scholars, as well as others specializing in international law.

== Activism ==
On 28 August 2007, regarding the General Power of Attorney by Sunjong, Korean newspaper Dong-a Ilbo reported that Korean monarchs did not sign in the official documents with their real names, traditionally, but the Korean Emperor was forced by Japan to follow a new custom to sign with his real name, which originated from the Western Hemisphere. It mentioned Sunjong's signature may be compulsory.

On 23 June 2010, 75 South Korean congressmen suggested the legal nullification of the Japan–Korea Annexation Treaty to the Prime Minister Naoto Kan.

On 6 July 2010, Korean and Japanese progressive Christian groups gathered in Tokyo's Korean YMCA chapter and jointly declared that the Japan–Korea Annexation Treaty was unjustified.

On 28 July 2010, around 1000 intellectuals in Korea and Japan issued a joint statement that the Japan–Korea Annexation Treaty was never valid in the first place.

== See also ==
- Taft–Katsura Agreement
- Root–Takahira Agreement
- Treaty of Portsmouth
- Anglo–Japanese Alliance
- Unequal treaty
- History of Japan–Korea relations
- List of territories occupied by Imperial Japan
  - Korea under Japanese rule
