= Ŏ Yŏngdam =

Korean naval commander (1532–1594)

- 어영담
- Born: 1532
- Died: April 9, 1594 (aged 61–62); Hansando, Gyeongsang, Joseon Korea
- Military career
- Allegiance: Joseon Korea
- Branch: Navy
- Service years: 1580 –1594
- Rank: Third senior rank (정3품)
- Nickname: Kyŏngyu
- Conflicts: Imjin War; Battle of Okpo; Battle of Sacheon (1592); Battle of Hansan Island; Battle of Danghangpo

Korean name
- Hangul: 어영담
- Hanja: 魚泳潭
- RR: Eo Yeongdam
- MR: Ŏ Yŏngdam

Courtesy name
- Hangul: 경유
- Hanja: 景游
- RR: Gyeongyu
- MR: Kyŏngyu

Ŏ Yŏngdam (Korean: 어영담; Hanja: 魚泳潭; 1532 – April 9, 1594) was a Korean military official of the mid-Joseon Period who served as a magistrate of Gwangyang, Jeolla Province. He was a general under Admiral Yi Sun-sin during the Imjin war. He was known for his knowledge of waterways and built great achievements in Geoje, Okpo, and Danghangpo naval battles.

== Life ==
Ŏ Yŏngdam was born in 1532. His hometown is unknown, but he is said to have lived in Haman County, Gyeongsang Province. He excelled in martial arts and resourcefulness and was specially recruited as a subarea commander of Yeodo (여도만호; 呂島萬戶) at an early age. In 1564, he passed a military examination (무과; 武科) as a third person among third-tier passers.

He started his career on 1 December 1580, as a magistrate of Sacheon. Later, he was assigned as a magistrate in Goryeong, Mujang, and Eonyang, focusing on the coasts of Gyeongsang province and Jeolla province. He examined sea routes in detail, allowing the entry and exit of ships. In May 1592, he led Yi Sun-sin's waterway as a magistrate of Gwangyang. From the Battle of Okpo to the Battle of Angolpo, as the Central Commandant (중부장; 中部將), he played a big role in victory by defeating a total of 8 ships (4 large ships, 2 medium vessels and 2 small boats). In recognition of this contribution, he was promoted to Tongjeong (통정; 通政; Thoroughly Administrative), the third senior rank. When preparing for the provisions, He stored separately seeds of crops and crops for people's first aid. In February 1593, while he was participating in the Battle of Ungcheon and thus was not in Gwangyang, Im Bal-yeong, the secret royal inspector of transportation (독운어사; 督運御史), misunderstood the food stored separately and asked for his dismissal. Yi Sun-sin and the people of Gwangyang launched a campaign to publicize his innocence but were eventually dismissed. Later, Yi Sun-sin raised his ambition to appoint him as an Assistant Defense Commandant (조방장; 助防將) again and received permission from the court. In the Second Battle of Danghangpo, he smashed two large ships as the Assistant Defense Commandant.

On April 9, 1594, he died of an infectious disease in Hansando.

== See also ==
- History of Korea
- Naval history of Korea
