= Na Dae-yong =

Korean naval officer (1556–1612)

- Born: 1556; Naju, South Jeolla Province, Joseon
- Died: January 29, 1612 (aged 55–56)
- Military career
- Allegiance: Joseon

- Na Dae-yong
- Hangul: 나대용
- Hanja: 羅大用
- RR: Na Daeyong
- MR: Na Taeyong

Na Dae-yong (Korean: 나대용; Hanja: 羅大用; 1556 – January 29, 1612) was a Korean naval officer who fought against the Japanese navy in Imjin War and was also known as a designer of the turtle ship.

== Biography ==
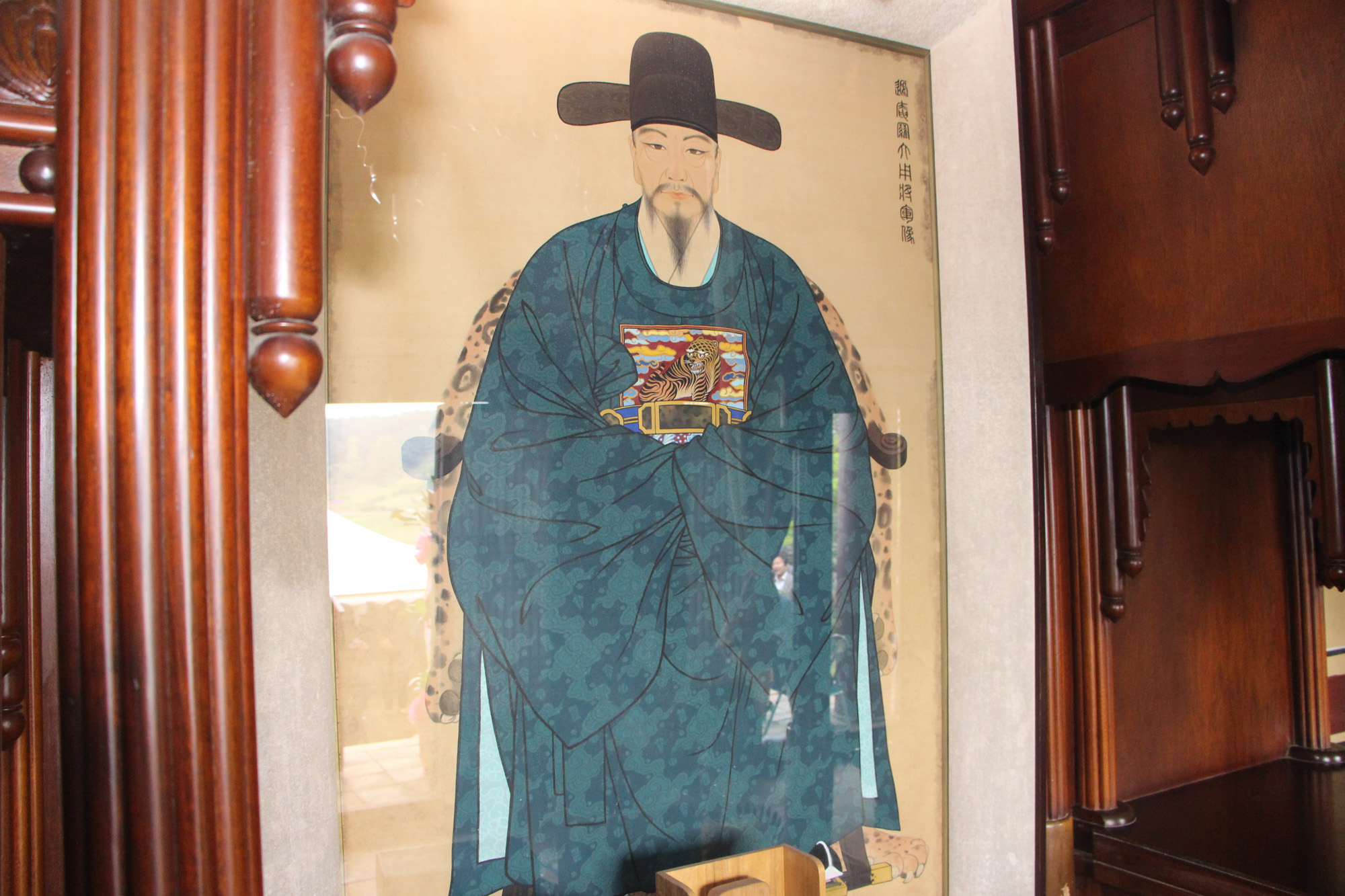
Portrait of Na Dae-yong

Na Dae-yong was born in Jeolla-do of Naju, passed the military examination in 1583, worked as a Hullyeonwon Bongsa (훈련원 봉사; 訓鍊院奉事), and was promoted to military officer in Jeollajwasuyeong. According to the address to the throne written by Na Dae-yong, he worked in army for 6 years to defend the northern lands and 7 years to defend the south lands, and worked under Yi Sun-sin as Battleship Managing Military Officer (감조전선출납군병군관; 監造戰船出納軍兵軍官).

During the Japanese invasion of Korea, he was assigned as Temporary Commander (gajang) of one of five harbors in Jwasuyeong, Balpo. He had done active service as commander of Yugun (유군; 遊軍), assistance soldiers. He served in the battles at Okpo, Sacheon, Hansan, Myeongnyang, and Noryang. He was shot during the Battle of Sacheon, but soon returned to active service.

After the war, Na continued to invent several warship designs. He died in 1612 and was buried at Munpyeongmyeong at Naju, South Jeolla Province.

== Contribution to turtle ship design ==
In 1587, Na dae-yong threw away his government post, and came to his hometown to design the turtle ship. He studied arithmetic, read books about ships, and produced a model of the turtle ship. At that time, there were administrators who were experts in mathematical calculations in big public works, but people who made personal inventions like Na dae-yong should have studied arithmetic alone to apply mathematical calculations on ship. Nevertheless, the design of turtle ship was successful.

Na looked up the designs of warships which people had made from the period of the Three States until now. At the moment, Joseon's naval forces' major warship was the Panokseon. One of the Panokseon's chief features was a higher upper deck, which hindered enemy boarding attempts and enabled the Korean crews to fire their arrows further. However, the front of the ship was relatively lower, so it could be attacked by enemies. Also, there were no ways to fend off enemy arrows or spears on the upper deck because the soldiers were exposed.

During the Goryeo period, the naval force used Gwaseon (과선; 戈船) to defeat the Japanese raiders. Gwaseon could fend off enemies by fixing knives in the ship's flanks. Additionally, they featured iron rams to attack enemy ships in front of the Gwaseon. The Byeolmaengseon (별맹선; 別猛船) was another type of warship that Na concerned himself with. A Byeolmaengseon's top deck was completely covered, and the soldiers were posted inside of the ship.

Na Dae-yong designed the turtle ship as a combination of the best features of the Gwaseon, the Byeolmaengseon, and the Panokseon. Its hull is likely based on the Panokseon, but the top deck was completely covered like with the Byeolmaengseon, and the spikes on its roof came from the Gwaseon.

== Related historical documents ==
=== Joseon Wangjo Sillok ===
Na Dae-yong appears to a total of 27 times in the Joseon Wangjo Sillok: 3 times in the Seonjo Sillok and 24 times in the Gwanghae-gun Ilgi. In Seonjo Sillok, Seonjo is asked for Na Dae-yong's removal for 2 times. Only one record about Na Dae-yong in the Seonjo Sillok is related to ship architecture, and it is the only one found in the entire Joseon Wangjo Sillok.

After that, Gwanghae-gun Ilgi shows that the Saheon-bu (사헌부; 司憲府; Office of the Inspector General) and the Sagan-won (사간원; 司諫院; Office of the censor general) had repeatedly asked for Na Dae-Yong's removal from his position as governor of Gonyang (1608) and magistrate of Namhae district (1610). These offices are organizations responsible for licensing officials, impeachment and legal inquiries and had a duty of criticizing and giving some feedback about the king's orders. In these documents Na Dae-yong is depicted as a greedy, silly alcoholic who exploited local people with his power.

=== Ichungmugong Jeonseo ===
Ichungmugong Jeonseo (이충무공전서; 忠武公李舜臣全書; Admiral Yi's Testament) is a complete collection of Yi Sun-sin's posthumous works. It was published in the year 1795, and it contains famous documents like Nanjung ilgi.

=== Cheam Na Dae-yong Jang-gun Silgi ===
Cheam Na Dae-yong Jang-gun Silgi (체암나대용장군실기; 遞庵羅大用將軍実記) is a book that was published by the Cheam Na Dae-yong Jang-gun Memorial Foundation (체암나대용장군기념사업회; 遞庵羅大用將軍記念事業會) in the year 1976. The organization also constructed Na Dae-yong Jang-gunGijeogbi (나대용장군기적비; 羅大用將軍紀蹟碑).

=== Other documents ===
Other documents like Yeosu ∙ Yeocheon local history book, Naju Mokji (a book containing various information about the province of Naju) also writes about Na Dae-yong.

== Centers ==
=== The War Memorial of Korea ===
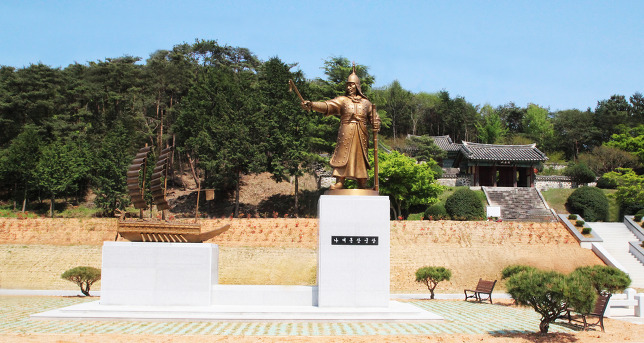
Sochungsa of Na Dae-yong. It was built to extol General Na Dae-yong's karma.

The War Memorial of Korea is located in Yongsan-dong, Yongsan District, Seoul, South Korea. There are six indoor exhibition rooms and an outdoor exhibition center. The six indoor exhibition rooms are named "Room of Respect to Defense of Nation", "Room of War History", "Room of the Korean War", "Room of the Dispatch of Foreign Forces", "Room of the Development of Armed Forces", and "Room of the Fully-Equipped Warship." In the outdoor exhibition, there are large-sized weaponry. The model of the Turtle Ship and documents alluding to Na Dae-yong are in the Joseon Dynasty section in the Room of War History.

=== Sochungsa ===
The Sochungsa (소충사; 召忠祠) memorial was erected to extol Nadaeyong's patriotism and endeavors to reinforce the combat capabilities of the navy. The Sochungsa consists of a model of the Turtle Ship and a cenotaph of Na Dae-yong. It was built in 1977, and Na's achievements are celebrated every April 21.

=== Birthplace and burial site ===
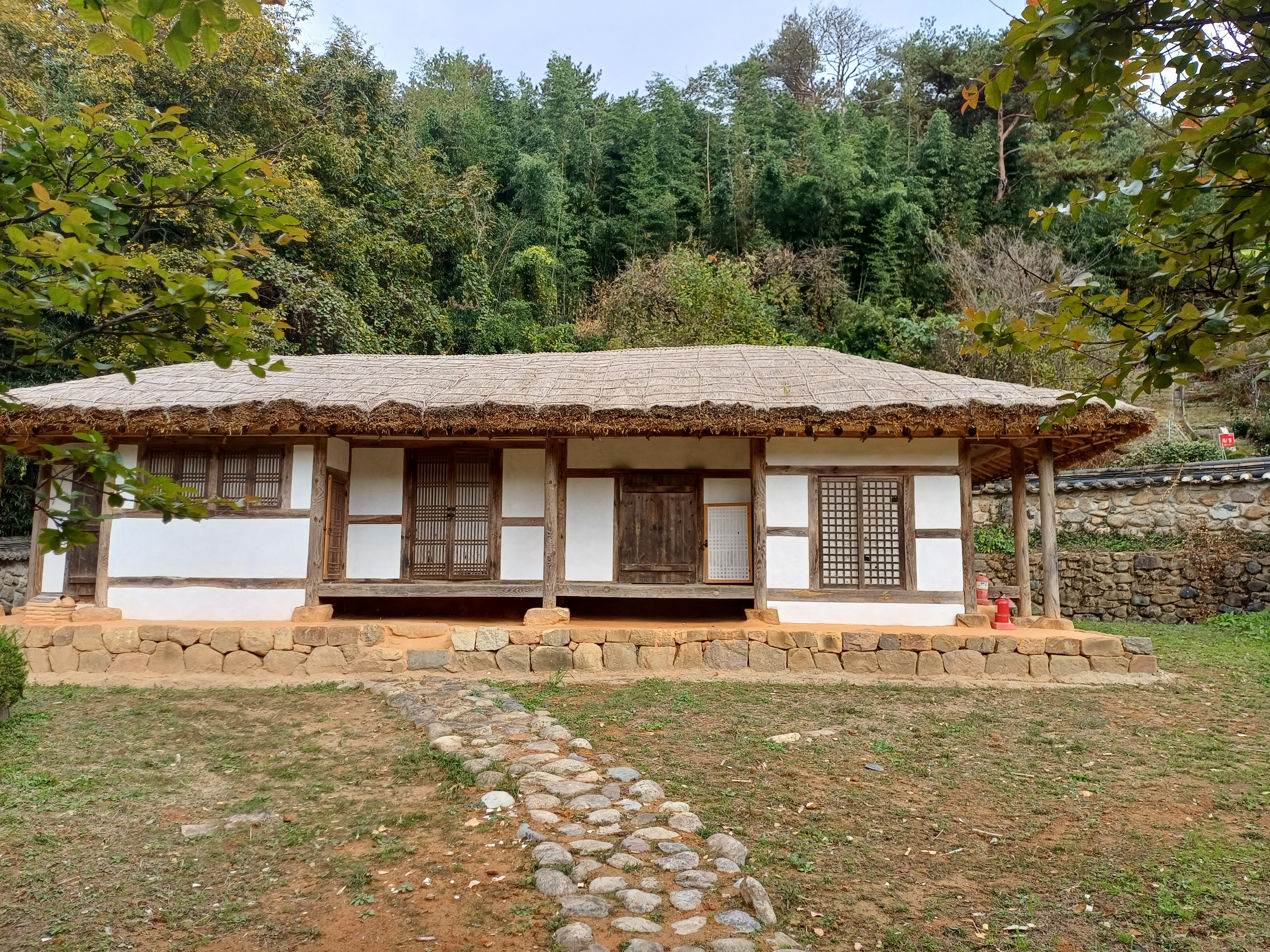
The Birthplace of Na Dae-yong, Naju, South Jeolla Province

Na Dae-yong's house is located on Moonpyeong-myeon, Naju. It is a north-headed house of four-by-one size. His burial ground is located in the base of the mountain, which is about 3 km away from Nadaeyong's house. It is named as the 26th remembrance of Jeollanam-do.

== Depictions in modern culture ==
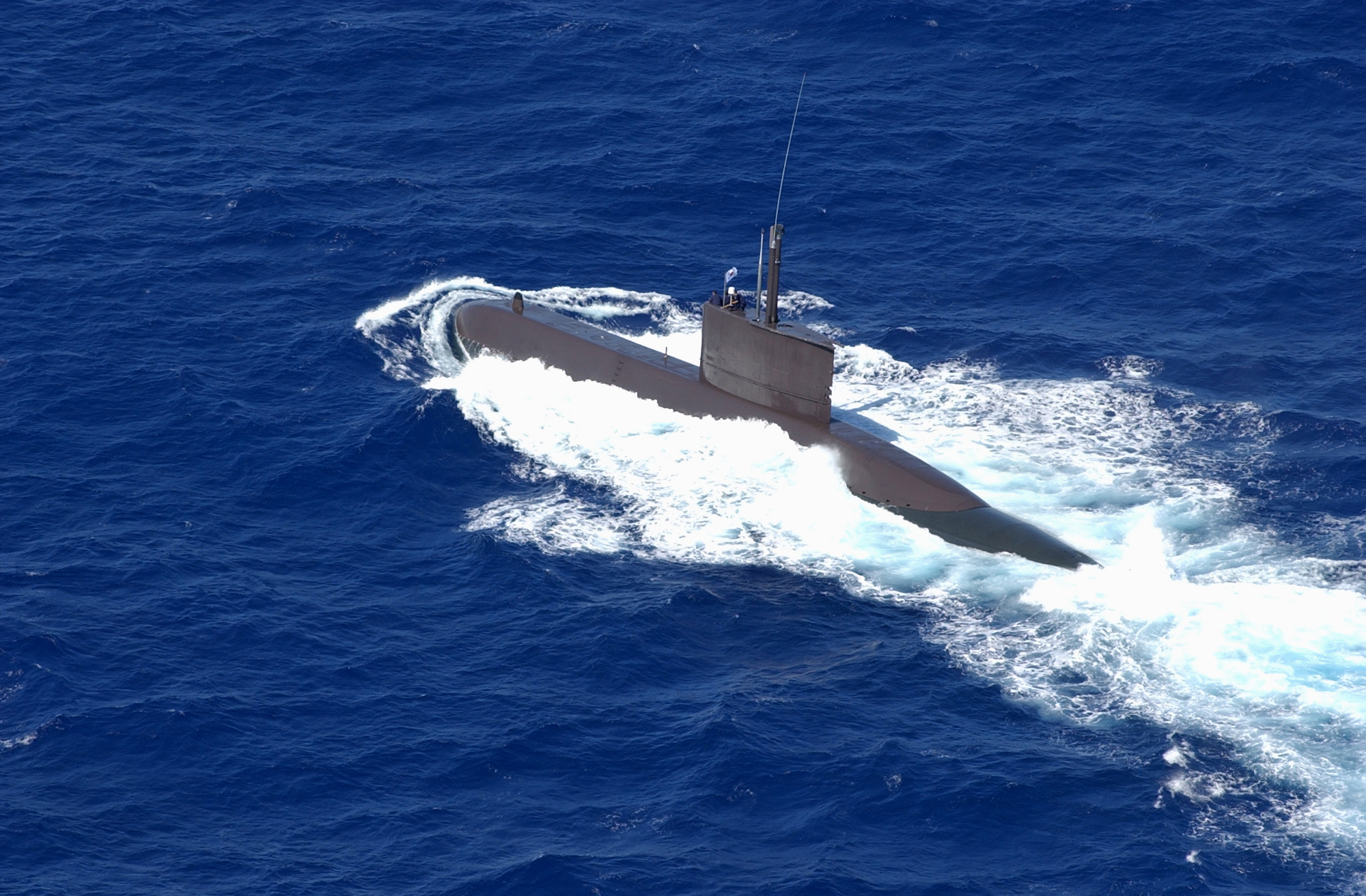
ROKS Na Dae-yong (SS-069)

- Portrayed by Lee Sang-in in the 2004–2005 KBS1 TV series Immortal Admiral Yi Sun-sin.
- Appeared in the 2009 limited comic series Yi Soon Shin: Warrior and Defender
- Portrayed by Jang Jun-yeong in the 2014 film The Admiral: Roaring Currents
- Portrayed by Jung Jin in the 2016 KBS1 TV series Imjin War.
- Portrayed by Park Ji-hwan in the 2022 film Hansan: Rising Dragon.

== See also ==
- Naval history of Korea
- Imjin War
- ROKS Na Dae-yong (SS-069)
- Turtle ship
- Immortal Admiral Yi Sun-sin
