= Tongjeyeong =

Joseon-era estate in Tongyeong, South Korea

Coordinates: 34.8478°N 128.4231°E

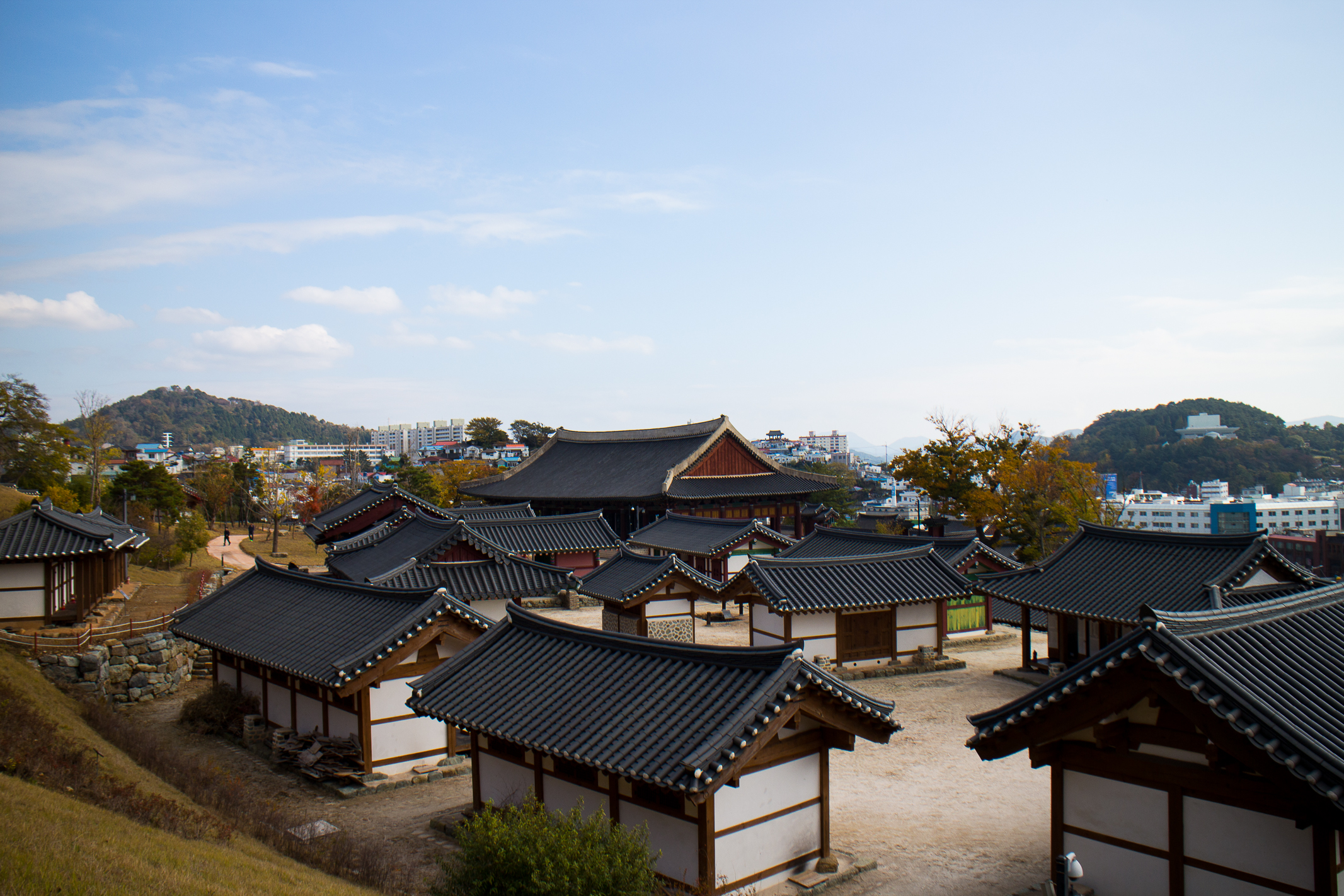
- Part of Tongjeyeong (2016)
- Interactive map of Tongjeyeong

Historic Sites of South Korea
- Official name: Navy Headquarters of Three Provinces, Tongyeong
- Designated: 1998-02-20
- Reference no.: 402

Tongyeong Samdo Sugun Tongjeyeong (Korean: 삼도수군통제영) is the official residence of the Samdo Sugun Controller of the Joseon Dynasty located in Munhwa-dong, Tongyeong, South Gyeongsang Province, South Korea, and is the headquarters of the Samdo Sugun. On February 20, 1998, it was designated as Historic Site No. 402 of the Republic of Korea, but the name of the cultural property was changed to Tongyeong Samdo Sugun Tongjeyeong on July 28, 2011.

== History ==
The origin of the Tongjeyeong can be traced back to the year following the outbreak of the Imjin War, specifically to the 16th year of King Seonjo's reign in 1593. During this period, a new position known as the Samdosugun Control Officer was established, and it was concurrently bestowed upon Yi Sun-sin, who was then serving as the Left Navy Commander in Jeolla Province. This marked the inception of the Control Officer's headquarters, known as the Samdosugun Control Office, colloquially referred to as the Control Office or Tongyeong. Notably, Yi Sun-sin, who was appointed as the first Control Officer during the Imjin War, led his campaign from the fortress of Hansanjin, which became the inaugural Control Office.

In the 36th year of King Seonjo's reign, in 1603, the 6th Samdosugun Control Officer, Yi Gyeong-jun, designated the location for the Samdosugun Control Office at Duryongpo (present-day within the jurisdiction of Tongyeong City). He initiated the construction of the Control Office, and within just two years, by the 38th year of King Seonjo's reign in 1605, lunar calendar July 14, he established structures such as Sebyeonggwan, Baekhwadang, and Jeonghaejung. These structures continued to exist for 292 years until the 32nd year of King Gojong's reign in 1895, when military facilities and fortifications in various regions were dismantled.

Following the annexation by Japan and their national assimilation policies, only Sebyeonggwan remained, with over a hundred other buildings, both large and small, being demolished. Subsequently, schools, courts, prosecutors' offices, and tax offices were established in their place. In 1975, Sebyeonggwan and its surrounding areas were revitalized, and in 1996, archaeological surveys were conducted, confirming the historical significance of the site.

== Tourism ==
Tongjeyeong is a representative night tourist attraction in Tongyeong, which was selected as the first night tourism specialized city in South Korea in 2022. Tongyeong city has been organizing cultural heritage night events centered around the Tonjeyeong for the past five years.
