= Battle of Okpo =

1592 Korea–Japan naval battle

- Part of Imjin War
Date	June 16, 1592 (Gregorian Calendar); May 7, 1592 (Lunisolar calendar)
Location	Okpo Bay, Gyeongnam, Korea 34.8942°N 128.6885°E
Result	Korean victory

Belligerents
Toyotomi Japan	Kingdom of Joseon

Commanders and leaders
Tōdō Takatora	Yi Sun-sin; Wŏn Kyun; Eo Yeong-dam

Strength
50 transports	43 warships 2 small ships 46 fishing boats

Casualties and losses
26 transports	1 wounded
- Location within South Korea

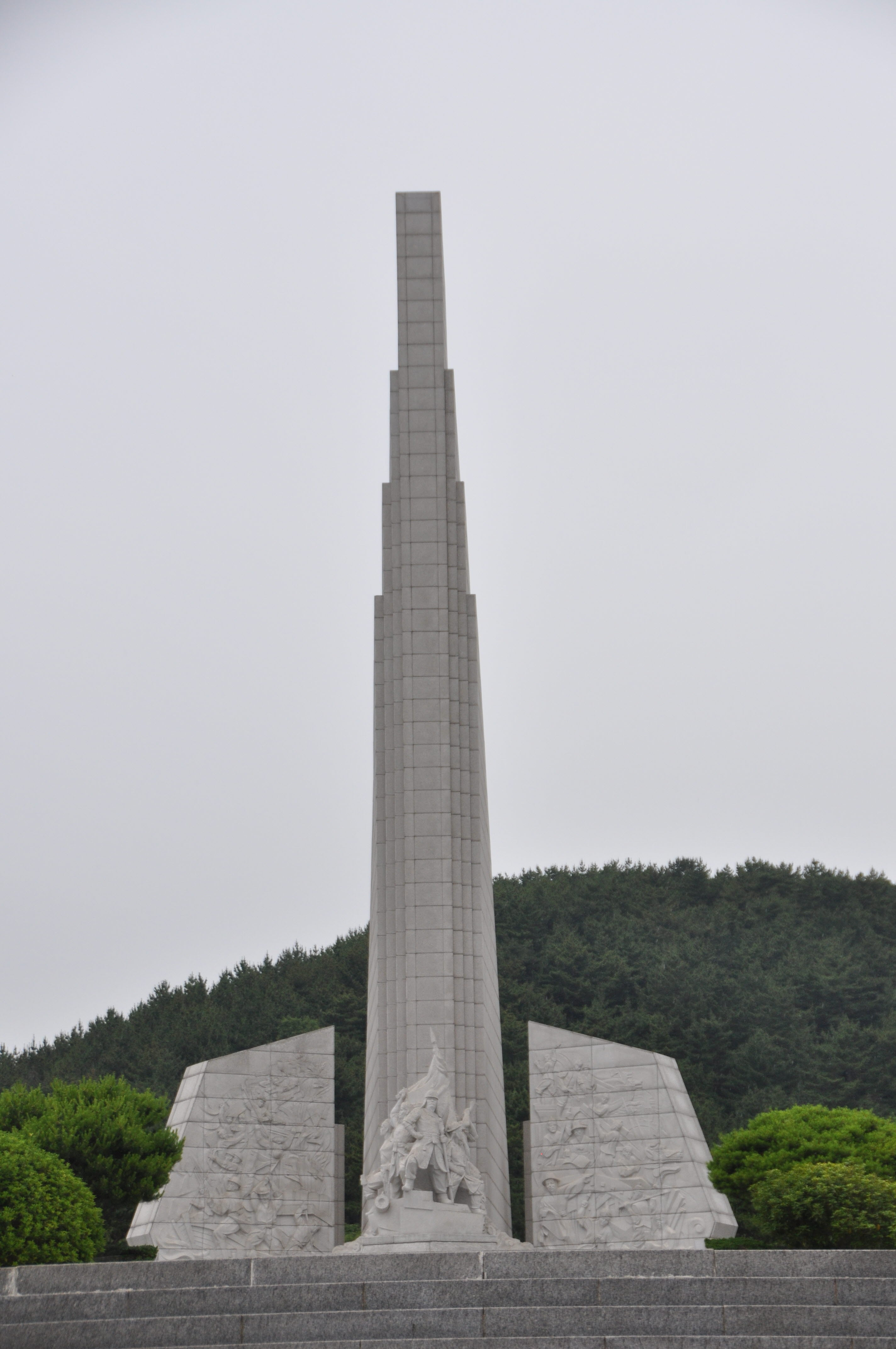
Commemorative monument to the Battle of Okpo

The Battle of Okpo was a military engagement which took place during the Japanese invasions of Korea (1592–98), also known as the Imjin War. Korean commanders Yi Sun-sin and Wŏn Kyun's fleet destroyed a group of anchored Japanese transport ships. It was the first naval battle of the Imjin War, and the first victory of Admiral Yi against the Japanese naval fleet of Todo Takatora. A day later, after destroying an additional 18 Japanese transport vessels in nearby waters, Yi Sun-sin and Wŏn Kyun parted ways and returned to their home ports after receiving news of the fall of Hanseong. The Battle of Okpo caused anxiety and nervousness among the Japanese, because afterward Yi began to deploy his navy to attack Japanese supply and carrier vessels.

Yi's headquarters were at Yeosu, which is west of Namhae Island of the southern coast of Korea. The surrounding area of Okpo and Yeosu is dotted with numerous islands and narrow straits. It was in that area where many of the naval battles in which Yi defeated the Japanese took place.

== Background ==
The Japanese invasion of Korea began with the arrival of 400 transports bearing 18,700 men under the command of Konishi Yukinaga on 23 May 1592 for the Siege of Busanjin. Over the next several weeks, the Japanese fleet ferried Toyotomi Hideyoshi's invasion force of 158,000 men to the Busan area, and the Japanese armies had advanced rapidly northward, and had seized the Korean capital of Hanseong by 16 June. As the Japanese now prepared to advance further north, logistics became an issue, and Japanese transports began exploring further up the west coast of the Korean peninsula as it was not practical to carry large amounts of supplies overland given the rough terrain and poor state of the roads.

At the time of the invasion, the Korean naval forces were divided into regional commands. Panicking after the fall of Busan to the Japanese, Gyeongsang Left Navy Commander Bak Hong ordered his weapons and stores destroyed, and scuttled his fleet of 100 warships without giving combat. Likewise, after the fall of Dongnae, Gyeongsang Right Navy Commander Wŏn Kyun attempted to withdraw his ships to Hansando but mistook a bunch of fishing ships for the Japanese fleet. He proceeded to destroy his weapons and stores, and to scuttle his fleet. He was dissuaded from deserting his command by his subordinates, by which time he had only four vessels remaining. Wŏn Kyun called on Yi Sun-sin for assistance; however, as commander of the Cholla Left Navy, he was not allowed to leave his region without permission from his superiors. Yi also had a number of other reasons to delay. He needed to acquire charts of the rocky coastal waters of Gyeongsang Province for his fleet to navigate safely, and he was also uncertain of the discipline of the men under his command and was forced to execute deserters to set an example, including on 12 June, the day Hanseong fell to the Japanese. Yi Sun-sin had hoped to combine his forces with that of Cholla Right Navy Commander Yi Ŏkki; however, when orders came from the capital, he was ordered to combine with the now non-existent forces of Wŏn Kyun instead. With Wŏn Kyun's remaining four vessels, Yi Sun-sin had 39 warships under his command (24 large panokseon and 15 smaller hyeupson) and 46 smaller open boats.

When Yi Sun-sin and Wŏn Kyun arrived near Geojedo on 16 June, a scouting vessel alerted them to the presence of Japanese ships anchored at the port of Okpo.

== Battle ==
Yi Sun-sin's fleet approached Okpo on 17 June. Yi's flagship was in the center of a line with the other heavy warships in the center and light vessels to the left and right, and Wŏn Kyun lingering at the rear of the formation. When they entered the harbor they found more than 50 Japanese transport ships, mostly unmanned, and the crews looting in the village. Angered, Yi attacked. Due to smoke around Okpo, the Japanese did not notice the arrival of the Korean fleet until it was upon them. The Japanese panicked and quickly boarded their ships in an attempt to escape, but found they were surrounded and hemmed into the port. After encircling the Japanese, the Koreans then commenced firing with their cannons. Under order from Todo Takatora, the Japanese tried to fight back with their firearms but the arquebus, while effective on land, did little damage to the thick wooden hulls of the Korean warships. Yi Sun-sin proceeded to bombard the trapped Japanese transports with his cannon and fire arrows until the Japanese threw their weapons and armor overboard, abandoned ship, and jumped into the water. In total, 26 Japanese transports were destroyed during the bombardment. A teenage Korean girl, taken by the Japanese to be used as a sex slave on board one of their ships, recalled:

Cannonballs and long arrows poured down like hail on the Japanese vessels from our ships. Those who were struck by the missiles fell dead, bathed in blood, while others rolled on deck with wild shrieks or jumped into the water to climb up to the hills. At that time, I remained motionless with fear in the bottom of the boat for longs hours, so I did not know what was happening in the outside world.

Yi Sun-sin resisted the impulse to land his men and to pursue the surviving Japanese on the island, as the risk was great and such an action would leave his fleet undermanned and vulnerable. When a group of Yi Sun-sin's men seized a Japanese ship, Wŏn Kyun's ships fired on them, mistaking them for enemies.

== Aftermath ==
After the battle Yi Sun-sin immediately received news of five other Japanese ships within their vicinity and gave chase. The Japanese fled to Happo harbor and abandoned their ships, which Yi ordered to be burned.

Soon after sunrise on 17 June, Yi Sun-sin received news of another 13 Japanese ships nearby and on setting sail, found the Japanese transports at Jeokjinpo. As at Okpo, the Japanese were engaged in looting and burning the village. Admiral Yi was again saddened by the Japanese harassment of the Koreans and ordered his men to throw a heavy volley of arrows and cannonballs upon the Japanese. They destroyed 11 out of 13 ships. The Koreans then took the treasures from the Japanese wrecks and sailed back to Yeosu. Enraged by the looting and encouraged by the ease of their success, Yi Sun-sin and Wŏn Kyun briefly considered continuing on to Busan to attack the main Japanese fleet. However, word came of the fall of Hanseong eight days before, and Yi Sun-sin and Wŏn Kyun decided to part ways and return to their home ports. Yi Sun-sin arrived back at Yeosu on 18 June, from which he wrote a long report to the court. In his report to King Seonjo about his victory, Admiral Yi Sun-sin found the samurai helmets of the Japanese to be rather strange, writing:

The red-black Japanese armour, iron helmets, horse manes, gold crowns, gold fleece, gold armour, feather dress, feather brooms, shell trumpets, and many other curious things, in strange shapes with rich ornaments strike onlookers with awe, like weird ghosts or strange beasts.

Yi Sun-shin's view of the Japanese slaughtering and looting local towns made him very determined to protect the Korean people by preventing the Japanese ships from even landing on shore. Later, at the Battle of Sacheon, he first used his "secret weapon", the turtle ships, and defeated the Japanese again.

== See also ==
- List of naval battles (16th century)

== Bibliography ==
- Alagappa, Muthiah (2003), Asian Security Order: Instrumental and Normative Features, Stanford University Press, ISBN 0-8047-4629-X
- Arano, Yasunori (2005), The Formation of a Japanocentric World Order, International Journal of Asian Studies
- Brown, Delmer M. (May 1948), "The Impact of Firearms on Japanese Warfare, 1543–1598", The Far Eastern Quarterly, 7 (3), Association for Asian Studies: 236–53, doi:10.2307/2048846, JSTOR 2048846, S2CID 162924328
- Eikenberry, Karl W. (1988), "The Imjin War", Military Review, 68 (2): 74–82
- Ha, Tae-hung; Sohn, Pow-key (1977), 'Nanjung Ilgi: War Diary of Admiral Yi Sun-sin, Yonsei University Press, ISBN 89-7141-018-3
- Haboush, JaHyun Kim (2016), The Great East Asian War and the Birth of the Korean Nation
- Hawley, Samuel (2005), The Imjin War, The Royal Asiatic Society, Korea Branch/UC Berkeley Press, ISBN 89-954424-2-5
- Jang, Pyun-soon (1998), Noon-eu-ro Bo-nen Han-gook-yauk-sa 5: Gor-yeo Si-dae (눈으로 보는 한국역사 5: 고려시대), Park Doo-ui, Bae Keum-ram, Yi Sang-mi, Kim Ho-hyun, Kim Pyung-sook, et al., Joog-ang Gyo-yook-yaun-goo-won. 1998-10-30. Seoul, Korea.
- Kim, Ki-chung (Fall 1999), "Resistance, Abduction, and Survival: The Documentary Literature of the Imjin War (1592–8)", Korean Culture, 20 (3): 20–29
- Kim, Yung-sik (1998), "Problems and Possibilities in the Study of the History of Korean Science", Osiris, 2nd Series, 13: 48–79, doi:10.1086/649280, JSTOR 301878, S2CID 143724260
- 桑田忠親 [Kuwata, Tadachika], ed., 舊參謀本部編纂, [Kyu Sanbo Honbu], 朝鮮の役 [Chousen no Eki] (日本の戰史 [Nihon no Senshi] Vol. 5), 1965.
- Neves, Jaime Ramalhete (1994), "The Portuguese in the Im-Jim War?", Review of Culture, 18: 20–24
- Niderost, Eric (June 2001), "Turtleboat Destiny: The Imjin War and Yi Sun Shin", Military Heritage, 2 (6): 50–59, 89
- Niderost, Eric (January 2002), "The Miracle at Myongnyang, 1597", Osprey Military Journal, 4 (1): 44–50
- Park, Yune-hee (1973), Admiral Yi Sun-shin and His Turtleboat Armada: A Comprehensive Account of the Resistance of Korea to the 16th Century Japanese Invasion, Shinsaeng Press
- Rockstein, Edward D. (1993), Strategic And Operational Aspects of Japan's Invasions of Korea 1592–1598 1993-6-18, Naval War College
- Sadler, A. L. (June 1937), "The Naval Campaign in the Korean War of Hideyoshi (1592–1598)", Transactions of the Asiatic Society of Japan, Second Series, 14: 179–208
- Sansom, George (1961), A History of Japan 1334–1615, Stanford University Press, ISBN 0-8047-0525-9
- Sohn, Pow-key (April–June 1959), "Early Korean Painting", Journal of the American Oriental Society, 79 (2): 96–103, doi:10.2307/595851, JSTOR 595851
- Stramigioli, Giuliana (December 1954), "Hideyoshi's Expansionist Policy on the Asiatic Mainland", Transactions of the Asiatic Society of Japan, Third Series, 3: 74–116
- Strauss, Barry (Summer 2005), "Korea's Legendary Admiral", MHQ: The Quarterly Journal of Military History, 17 (4): 52–61
- Swope, Kenneth M. (2006), "Beyond Turtleboats: Siege Accounts from Hideyoshi's Second Invasion of Korea, 1597–1598", Sungkyun Journal of East Asian Studies, 6 (2), Academy of East Asian Studies: 177–206
- Swope, Kenneth M. (2005), "Crouching Tigers, Secret Weapons: Military Technology Employed During the Sino-Japanese-Korean War, 1592–1598", The Journal of Military History, 69: 11–42, doi:10.1353/jmh.2005.0059, S2CID 159829515
- Swope, Kenneth M. (December 2002), "Deceit, Disguise, and Dependence: China, Japan, and the Future of the Tributary System, 1592–1596", The International History Review, 24 (4): 757–1008, doi:10.1080/07075332.2002.9640980, S2CID 154827808
- Swope, Kenneth M. (2009), A Dragon's Head and a Serpent's Tail: Ming China and the First Great East Asian War, 1592–1598, University of Oklahoma Press
- Turnbull, Stephen (2002), Samurai Invasion: Japan's Korean War 1592–98, Cassell & Co, ISBN 0-304-35948-3
- Turnbull, Stephen (2008), The Samurai Invasion of Korea 1592-98, Osprey Publishing Ltd
- Turnbull, Stephen (1998), The Samurai Sourcebook, Cassell & Co, ISBN 1-85409-523-4
- Villiers, John (1980), SILK and Silver: Macau, Manila and Trade in the China Seas in the Sixteenth Century (A lecture delivered to the Hong Kong Branch of the Royal Asiatic Society at the Hong Kong Club. 10 June 1980) (PDF)
- Yi, Min-woong (2004), Imjin Wae-ran Haejeonsa: The Naval Battles of the Imjin War [임진왜란 해전사], Chongoram Media [청어람미디어], ISBN 89-89722-49-7
