= Sung-jin =

- Hangul: 성진
- RR: Seongjin
- MR: Sŏngjin

Sung-jin, also spelled Seong-jin or Song-jin, is a Korean given name.

People with this name include:

- Pai Sung-jin (fl. 1940s), South Korean man who invented the abacus-like finger-counting method chisanbop
- Gong Sung-jin (born 1953), South Korean politician, member of the Grand National Party
- Yu Song-jin (born 1964 or 1965), South Korean engineer detained by North Korea for 137 days in 2009
- Kang Sung-jin (born 1971), South Korean actor
- Skull (singer) (born Park Sung-jin, 1979), South Korean reggae singer
- Lee Sung-jin (born 1985), South Korean archer
- Park Sung-jin (born 1985), South Korean football player
- Won Seong-jin (born 1985), South Korean go player
- Jo Sung-jin (born 1990), South Korean football player
- Seong-Jin Cho (born 1994), South Korean pianist
- Lim Sung-jin (born 1999), South Korea volleyball player

== See also ==
- List of Korean given names
