= Dongpirang village =

Village in Tongyeong, South Korea

Coordinates: 34°50′45″N 128°25′39″E

Dongpirang Village (Korean: 동피랑마을) is a village in Tongyeong-si, South Gyeongsang Province, South Korea.

The name of the village, located behind Jungang Market, Tongyeong City's representative fish market, is 'Dongpirang', meaning 'eastern cliff' ('Birang' in the local dialect of slope). Gangguan Port can be seen from above Dongpirang Village, and murals are painted on every wall along the winding uphill alleys. The redevelopment plan for the mountainside village around Jeongnyang-dong and Taepyeong-dong in Tongyeong-si has been changed and revised several times.

The murals attracted visitors, and there was public support for the preservation of the village. Government planners opted to spare three houses at the pinnacle of the village for the restoration of Dongporu, leading to the complete abandonment of the demolition plan. The village is now a tourism destination.

Dongpirang Village is also the site of Dongporu of Jeongjeyeong, installed by General Yi Sun-sin during the Joseon Dynasty. There were plans to demolish the village, restore Dongporu, and create a park around it, but in October 2007, a civic group called 'Blue Tongyeong 21' held the 'Dongpirang Coloring - National Mural Contest', and students and individuals from art colleges in the country participated.

Dongpirang Village was selected as the city's flagship nocturnal attraction as part of the Ministry of Culture, Sports and Tourism and the Korea Tourism Organization's Night Tourism Specialization City Development Project.
