= Tongyeong =

City in South Gyeongsang, South Korea

Coordinates: 34°50′N 128°25′E

- Municipal City
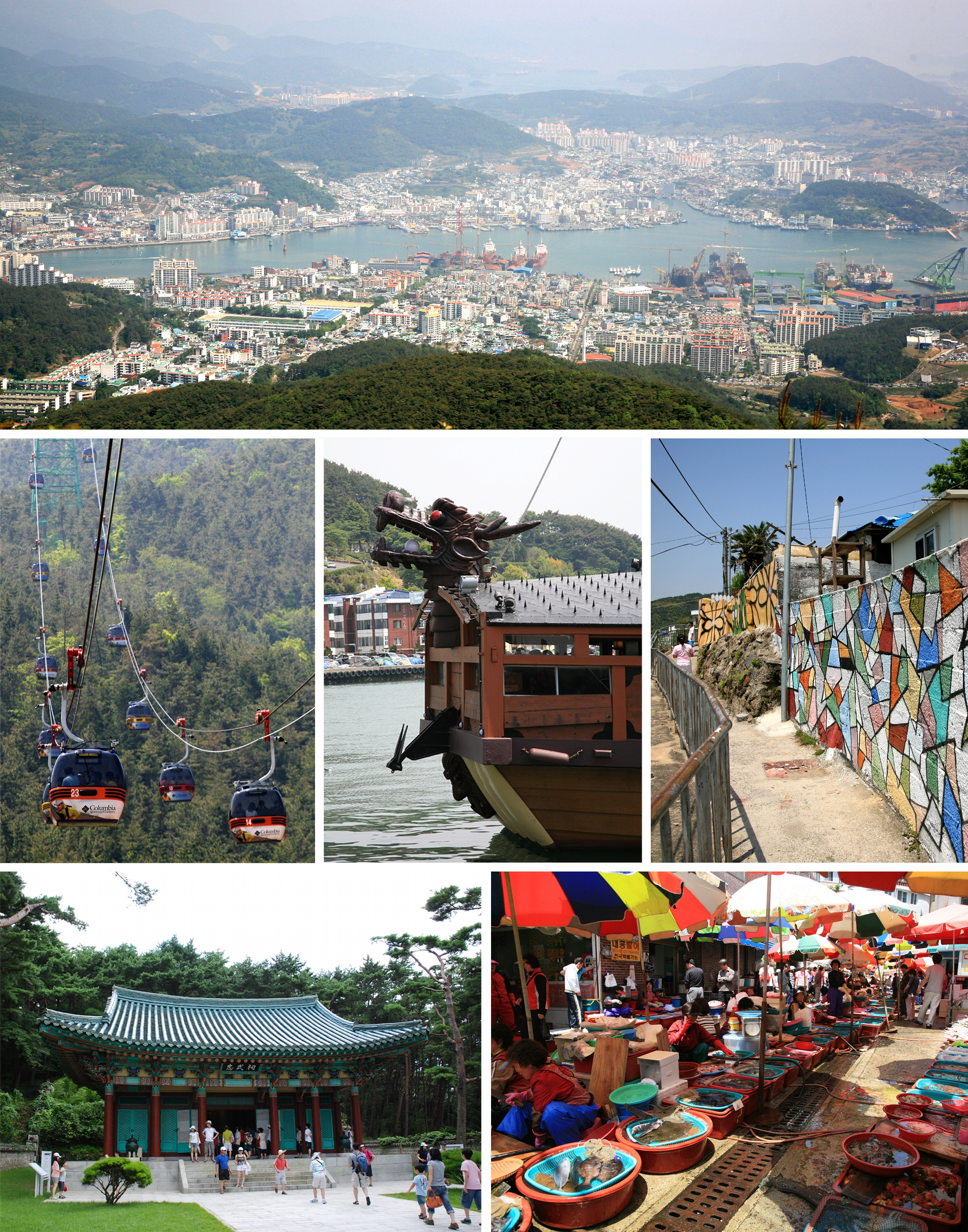
- Top: Hallyeo National Marine Park; middle left: Hallyeo Waterway Observation Cable Car; middle center: Turtle ship replica; middle right: Dongpirang Village; bottom left: Chungmusa shrineJungang; bottom right Live Fish Market.

- Flag Emblem of Tongyeong

- Location in South Korea
- Country: South Korea
- Region: Yeongnam
- Administrative divisions: 1 eup, 6 myeon, 11 dong

Government
  - mayor: Kang Seok-joo (강석주)

Area
  - Total: 236.5 km^{2} (91.3 sq mi)

Population (September 2024)
  - Total: 118,896
  - Density: 566.9/km^{2} (1,468/sq mi)
  - Dialect: Gyeongsang
- Time zone: UTC+9 (Korea Standard Time)
- Area code: +82-55

Korean name
- Hangul: 통영시
- Hanja: 統營市
- RR: Tongyeong-si
- MR: T'ongyŏng-si

Tongyeong (Korean: 통영; Korean pronunciation: [tʰoŋ.jʌŋ]) is a coastal city in South Gyeongsang Province, South Korea. It has an area of 238.81 km^{2} (92.21 sq mi) and in 2010, a population of 139,869 people. It is divided into 1 eup (town), 6 myeon (township) and 11 dong (neighborhood). Chungmu city and Tongyeong county were reunited in 1995, creating Tongyeong as it is known today. It consists of Goseong Peninsula, Hansando, Mireuk Island, Yokji Island and other islets. It was formerly known as Chungmu, after the posthumous name of Admiral Yi Sun-sin. The name Tongyeong means "command post" and is itself associated with Admiral Yi, as it refers to his principal base that was located on nearby Hansan Island.

== Notable people ==
Notable people associated with the city include Yi Sun-sin, whose headquarters were located there, and Yun Isang, a noted 20th-century composer.

Chungmu Halmae, or "Chungmu Grandmother", is a mythical old woman from Chungmu who gave her name to Chungmu Halmae Kimbap, a common Korean snack food. Chungmu Halmae, though mythical, is one of the most recognized personages from the area. The decision to group together a number of entities and incorporate them into the city of "Tongyong" erased the name Chungmu from the map of Korea and removed the home of the mythical grandmother from the peninsula.

Park Kyung-ni was a novelist, who wrote the well-known novel Toji (토지, The Land) consisting of a 16-volume story, in Korea.

Shin Suk-ja is a political prisoner held in Yodok political prison camp in North Korea. In August 2011 human rights activists from her hometown started the "Daughter of Tongyeong Rescue Campaign" to rescue her and her children.

Song Hyeong-jun is a member of South Korean boyband Cravity. He was also a former member of South Korean boyband X1 (band). He is best known for competing in survival show Produce X 101 and ranking 4th in the finale.

The football player Kim Min-jae was born in Tongyeong and played football for Tongyeong Elementary School football club. He plays as a centre-back for Bayern Munich and the South Korea national team.

== Sports ==
Tongyeong was the site of the first race of 2009 in the International Triathlon Union-sponsored ITU World Championship Series, which encompasses "international-distance" triathlon events in cities around the world. On May 3, 2009, Bevan Docherty of New Zealand won the men's race in a thrilling photo finish as he crossed the line almost simultaneously with Brad Kahlefeldt of Australia.

== Healthcare ==
In 2007, the total number of medical institutions was 106, including 4 hospitals, 63 clinics, one long-term care hospital, 22 dental hospitals, 16 Korean traditional medicine clinics. There are also 23 medical institutions related to Tongyeong Health Center affiliated to the Tongyeong City government.

== Food ==
There are several famous food in Tongyeong. Chungmu gimbap (충무김밥) and Ggulbbang (통영꿀빵), a honey bread dessert. Chungmu gimbab is Korean sushi made of seaweed and rice. It is served with baby octopus with spicy sauce. Chungmu gimbab is a popular traditional food in Tongyeong, which used to be called Chungmu.

Ppattegi gruel is a porridge made of dried sweet potatoes.

Sweet potatoes on Yokji Island in Tongyeong, South Gyeongsang Province, are famous. The sweet potato fields cover more than 70 percent of the slopes here, as they are useful for draining water. The abundant sunlight creates an optimal environment for sweet potato cultivation. It is said that the sea raised the sweet potatoes, hence the name "Sweet potatoes grown under the sea breeze."

== Education ==
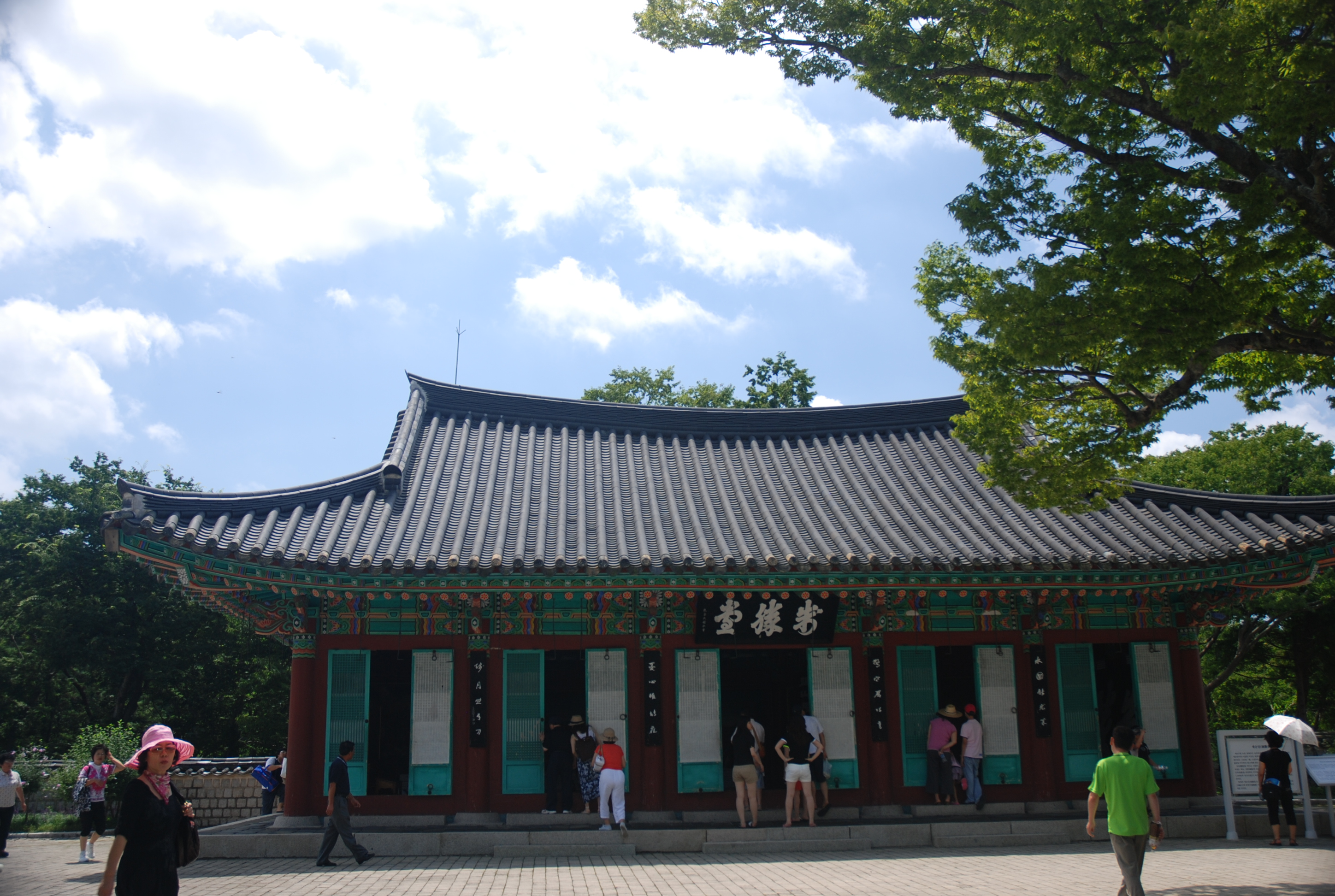
A view of Jeseungdang shrine, the predecessor of Unjudang in charge of military education of the Joseon navy

Tongyeong has several representative traditional educational institutions such as Unjudang (운주당), Baegun Seojae (백운서재), Tongyeong Hyanggyo (통영향교). Unjudang established on Hansan Island in 1592, took charge of military education of the Joseon navy. It was later reconstructed with the changed name as "Jeseungdang" (제승당). Baegun Seojae was a seodang, a private village school providing elementary education. Go Si-wan, a Silhak (practical learning) scholar founded it in 1805, the fifth year of King Sunjo's reign. Baegun Seojae is currently situated in the neighborhood of Docheon-dong and designated as the ninth Cultural Material of South Gyeongsang Province. Tongyeong Hyanggyo was a state-sponsored provincial school (hyanggyo) and was built in the site of the old Goseong Hyanggyo, which consists of 6 buildings; Daeseongjeon, Dongmu, Seomu, Myeongnyundang, Seojae, and Punghwaru. In the Daeseongjeon shrine, memorial tablets of five prominent scholars and Confucius are instituted.

Modern educational institutions started to be established in the city as Jinnam Commons School, the predecessor of Tongyeong Elementary School was opened in 1908. The educational system of Tongyeong is the same as elsewhere in the country. Schooling begins with preschools, of which there are 34 in the city. This is followed by 6 years in elementary schools, of which Tongyeong has 32 including 14 branch schools. Subsequently, students pass through 3 years of middle school. There are 11 middle schools in Tongyeong. High-school education, which lasts for three years, is not compulsory, but the most students do attend and graduate from high school. Tongyeong is home to 5 high schools. The College of Marine Science at Gyeongsang National University (GNU) is a branch campus in Tongyeong, specializing in marine-related studies. Its predecessor was Tongyeong Marine College, the successor of Gyeongnam Susan Jeonseupso (경남수산전습소) founded in 1917. The college was integrated into Gyeongsang National University in 1994.

== Tourism ==
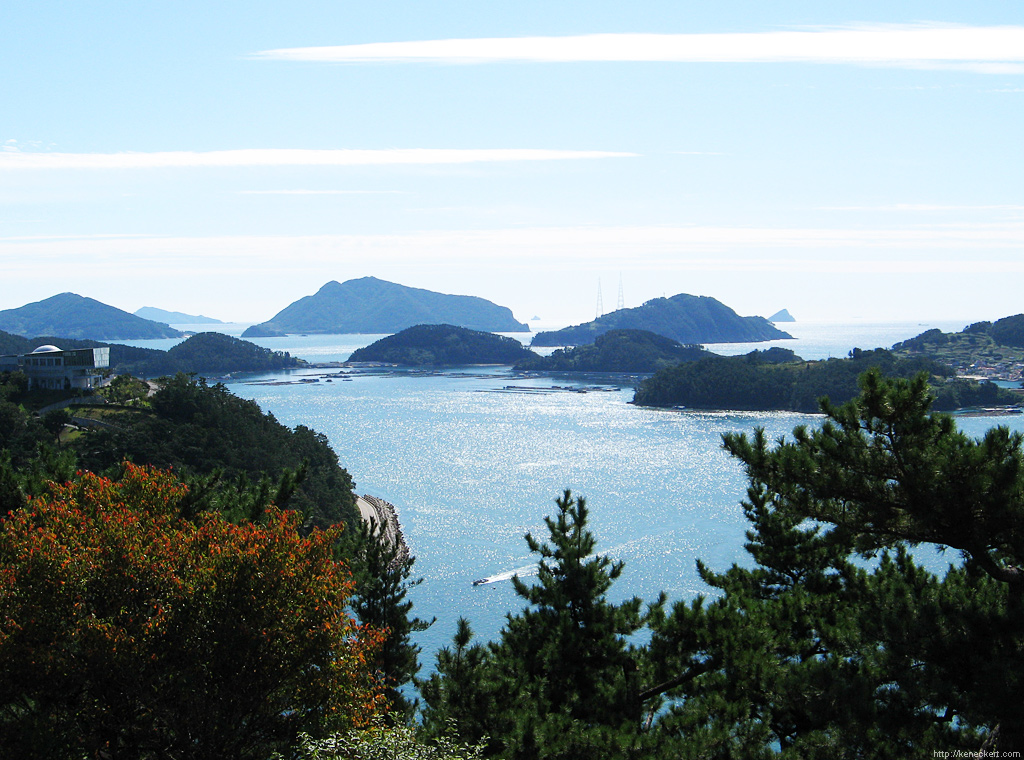
The island archipelago of Tongyeong

Tongyeong is a representative tourist city in the South Sea region of Gyeongsangnam-do. It has beaches, islands, and various historical sites based on its natural environment. Novelist Pak Kyongni, poet Yu Chi-hwan, and composer Isang Yun are from Tongyeong, and there are various cultural contents related to them.

Tongyeong attracted 5.35 million visitors in 2014, 7.35 million in 2017, and 6.28 million in 2018. Tongyeong has the nickname of "Naples of the East".

In 2022, Tongyeong was selected as the first specialized night tourism city in South Korea. This selection was part of the '2022 Specialized Night Tourism City Public Contest' hosted by the Ministry of Culture, Sports and Tourism and the Korea Tourism Organization.

Tongyeong planned various night tourism contents under the theme of 'Nine o'clock at night, Five Lights Tongyeong'. This includes DPIRANG (the longest and largest outdoor night digital theme park in Korea), Dongpirang (Mural Village), Gangguan Port (Tongyeong Traditional Central Market), Tongjeyeong (history and culture of Tongyeong), Seopirang Village (night view lighting), etc., which are five night tourism spots.

== Geography ==
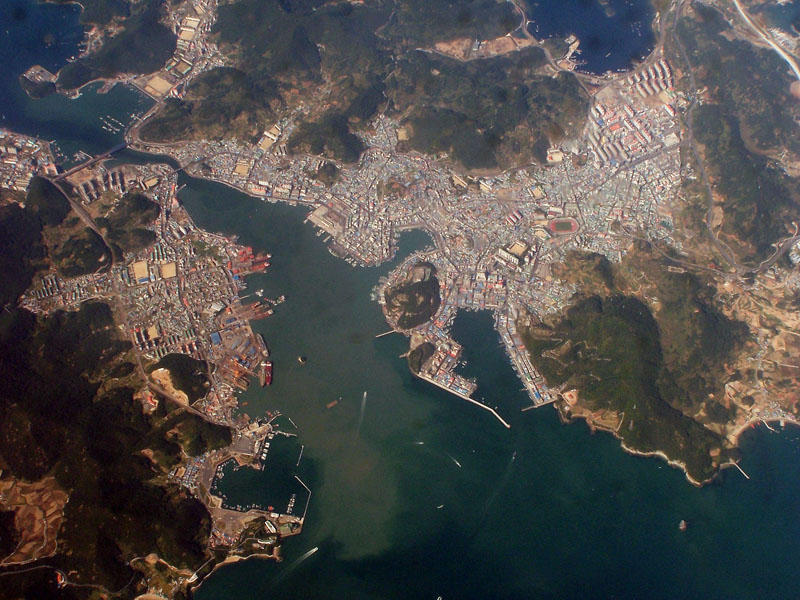
Aerial photo of Tongyeong.

Tongyeong is situated in the southern tip of Goseong peninsula and its three sides are surrounded by the sea. It consists of 41 inhabited and 110 uninhabited islands. Tongyeong Port, the east gate of Hallyeo Marine National Park, is referred to as the "most beautiful port in South Korea".

The geography consists of low mountains crossing over the south to the north on the Goseong peninsula. The mountain range stretches out from Byeokbang mountain (650 m) on the boundary of northern Goseong county (Goseong-gun) to the south, encompassing Cheongae mountain (525 m), Baral mountain (261 m), Jeseokbong peak (279 m) and Yongha mountain (461 m) on Mireukdo island.

As Tongyeong is influenced by East Korea Warm Current, it has a mild oceanic climate during the whole year. The city is the warmest region in South Gyeongsang province, with the average annual temperature at 14.7 °C (58 °F). The coldest month is January, with an average temperature of 2.5 °C while the hottest month is August, with the average temperature of 25.7 °C. The average range of temperature is narrow. Plants growing in the city show characters of the warm temperate zone such as Cryptomeria, Chamaecyparis obtusa, Pinus thunbergii, Paulownia coreana, Pitch Pine, bamboo, camellia, and palm trees.

The average annual rainfall is 1,397 millimeters, so Tongyeong is classified as one of places in South Korea that receive a lot of rain.

=== Climate ===
Tongyeong has a humid subtropical climate (Köppen: Cfa/Cwa).

Climate data for Tongyeong (1991–2020 normals, extremes 1968–present)
Month	Jan	Feb	Mar	Apr	May	Jun	Jul	Aug	Sep	Oct	Nov	Dec	Year
Record high °C (°F)	18.4 (65.1)	19.1 (66.4)	21.8 (71.2)	26.7 (80.1)	30.7 (87.3)	30.8 (87.4)	36.9 (98.4)	36.3 (97.3)	35.1 (95.2)	29.4 (84.9)	25.2 (77.4)	20.0 (68.0)	36.9 (98.4)
Mean daily maximum °C (°F)	7.9 (46.2)	9.6 (49.3)	13.3 (55.9)	17.9 (64.2)	22.1 (71.8)	24.8 (76.6)	27.6 (81.7)	29.6 (85.3)	26.7 (80.1)	22.3 (72.1)	16.2 (61.2)	10.2 (50.4)	19.0 (66.2)
Daily mean °C (°F)	3.1 (37.6)	4.8 (40.6)	8.7 (47.7)	13.3 (55.9)	17.6 (63.7)	20.9 (69.6)	24.4 (75.9)	26.0 (78.8)	22.5 (72.5)	17.4 (63.3)	11.3 (52.3)	5.4 (41.7)	14.6 (58.3)
Mean daily minimum °C (°F)	−0.8 (30.6)	0.6 (33.1)	4.5 (40.1)	9.2 (48.6)	13.9 (57.0)	18.0 (64.4)	22.0 (71.6)	23.4 (74.1)	19.4 (66.9)	13.6 (56.5)	7.3 (45.1)	1.3 (34.3)	11.0 (51.8)
Record low °C (°F)	−11.2 (11.8)	−11.6 (11.1)	−8.9 (16.0)	−1.6 (29.1)	6.1 (43.0)	11.4 (52.5)	15.6 (60.1)	15.0 (59.0)	11.8 (53.2)	2.7 (36.9)	−3.8 (25.2)	−9.3 (15.3)	−11.6 (11.1)
Average precipitation mm (inches)	32.2 (1.27)	49.5 (1.95)	92.4 (3.64)	138.8 (5.46)	159.6 (6.28)	195.8 (7.71)	289.1 (11.38)	243.9 (9.60)	177.1 (6.97)	76.4 (3.01)	48.6 (1.91)	32.4 (1.28)	1,535.8 (60.46)
Average precipitation days (≥ 0.1 mm)	4.9	5.4	8.2	9.2	9.4	10.5	14.4	11.7	8.8	5.3	6.1	4.6	98.5
Average snowy days	1.6	1.5	0.9	0.0	0.0	0.0	0.0	0.0	0.0	0.0	0.1	0.9	5.0
Average relative humidity (%)	53.7	55.3	60.7	65.6	72.1	79.4	84.9	81.0	75.3	67.3	63.5	56.0	67.9
Mean monthly sunshine hours	196.8	189.2	202.8	209.0	221.4	174.4	154.6	186.2	170.3	210.9	190.4	199.8	2,305.8
Percentage possible sunshine	63.4	62.3	54.3	52.6	50.1	40.2	33.4	45.5	45.7	60.1	63.0	67.6	51.9
Source: Korea Meteorological Administration (snow and percent sunshine 1981–2010)

== Gallery ==
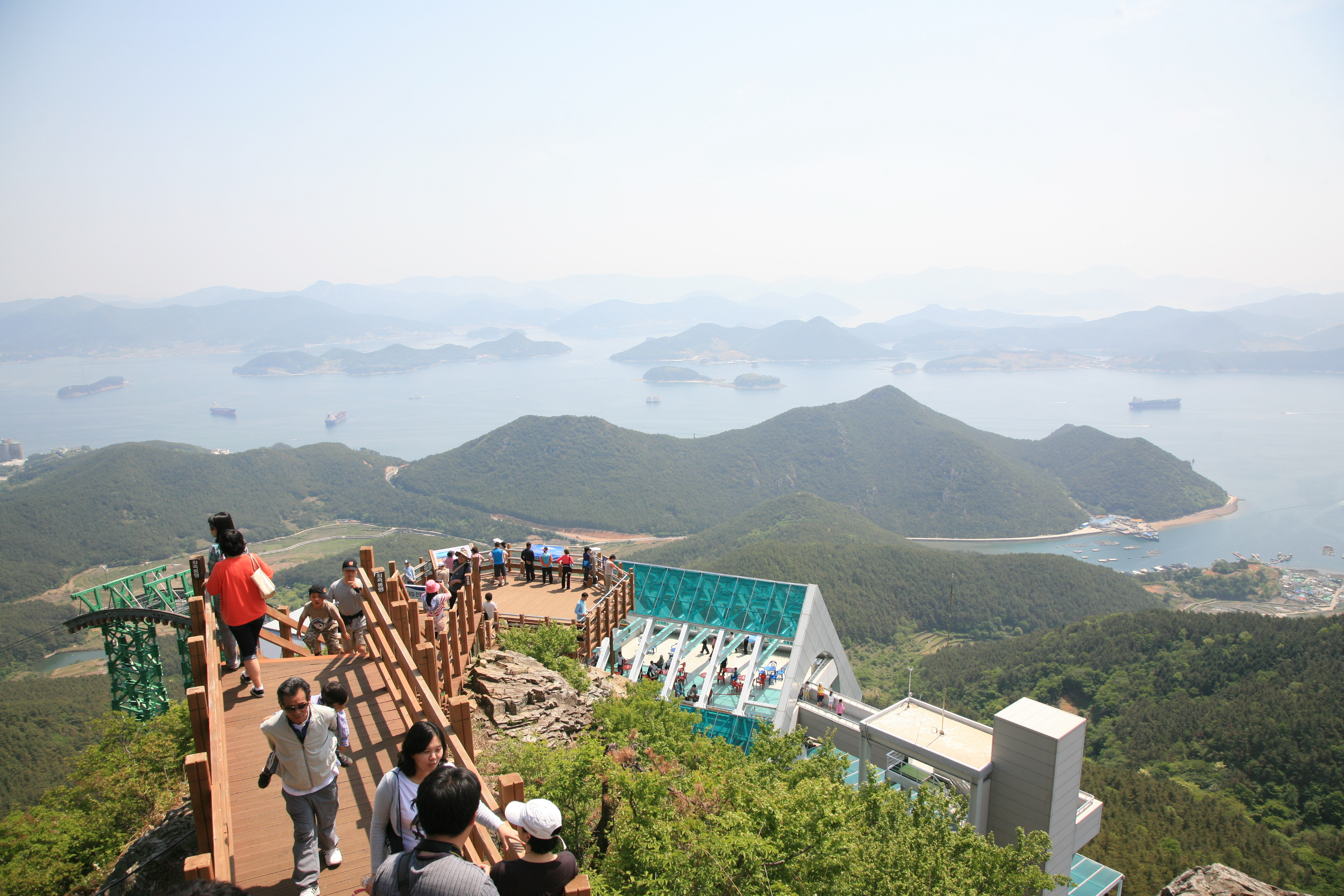
Hallyeo National Marine Park

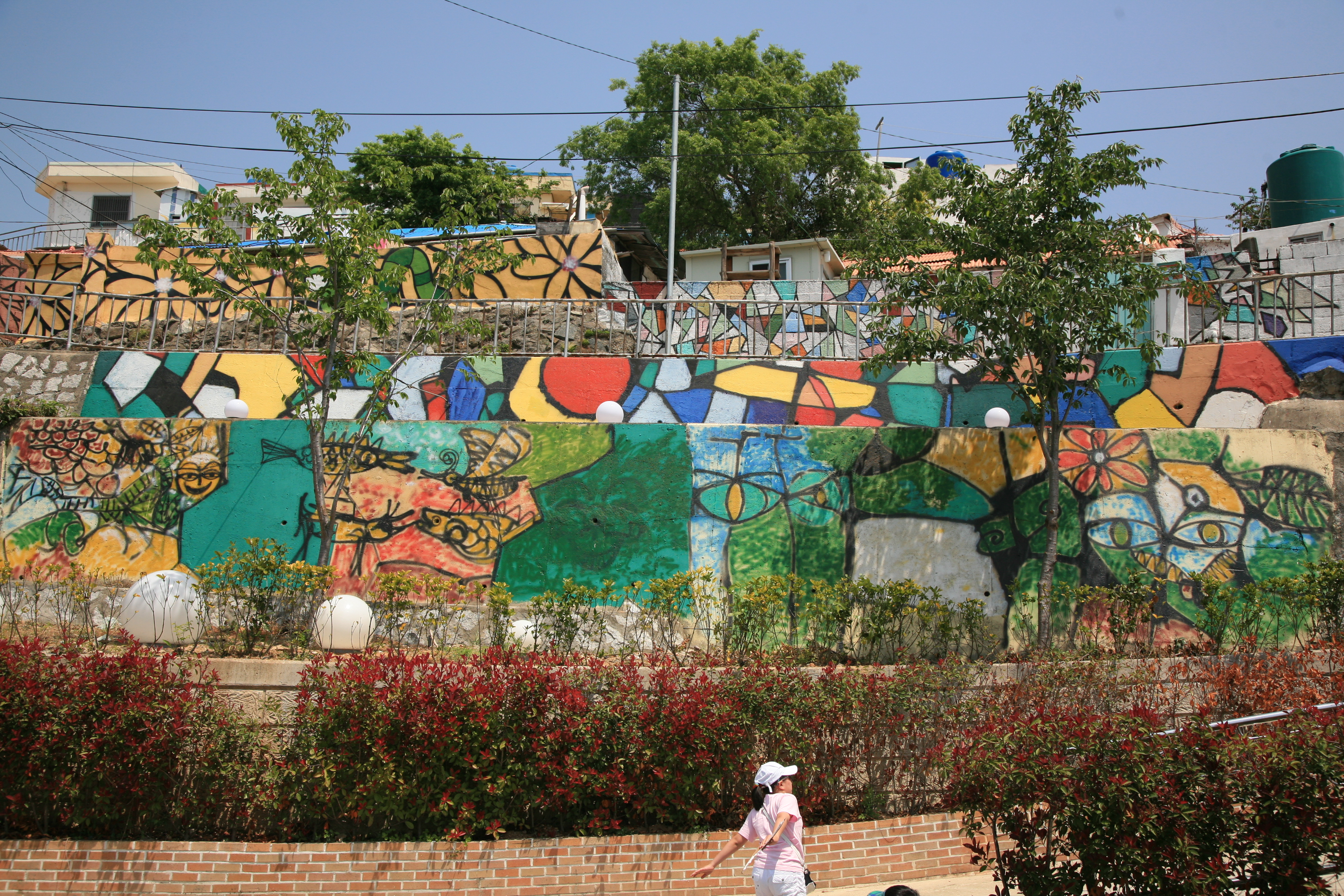
Dongpirang Village

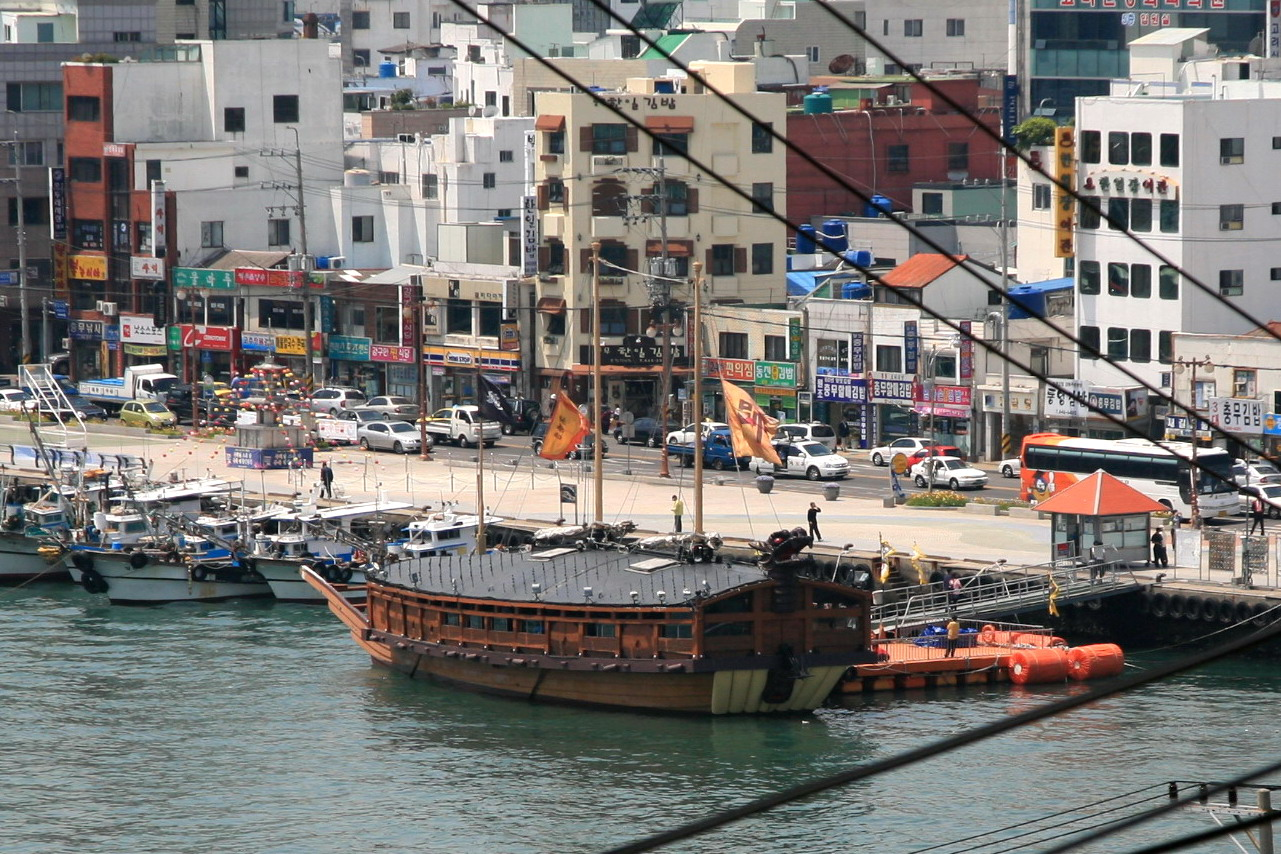
Turtle ship replica in Tongyeong Port

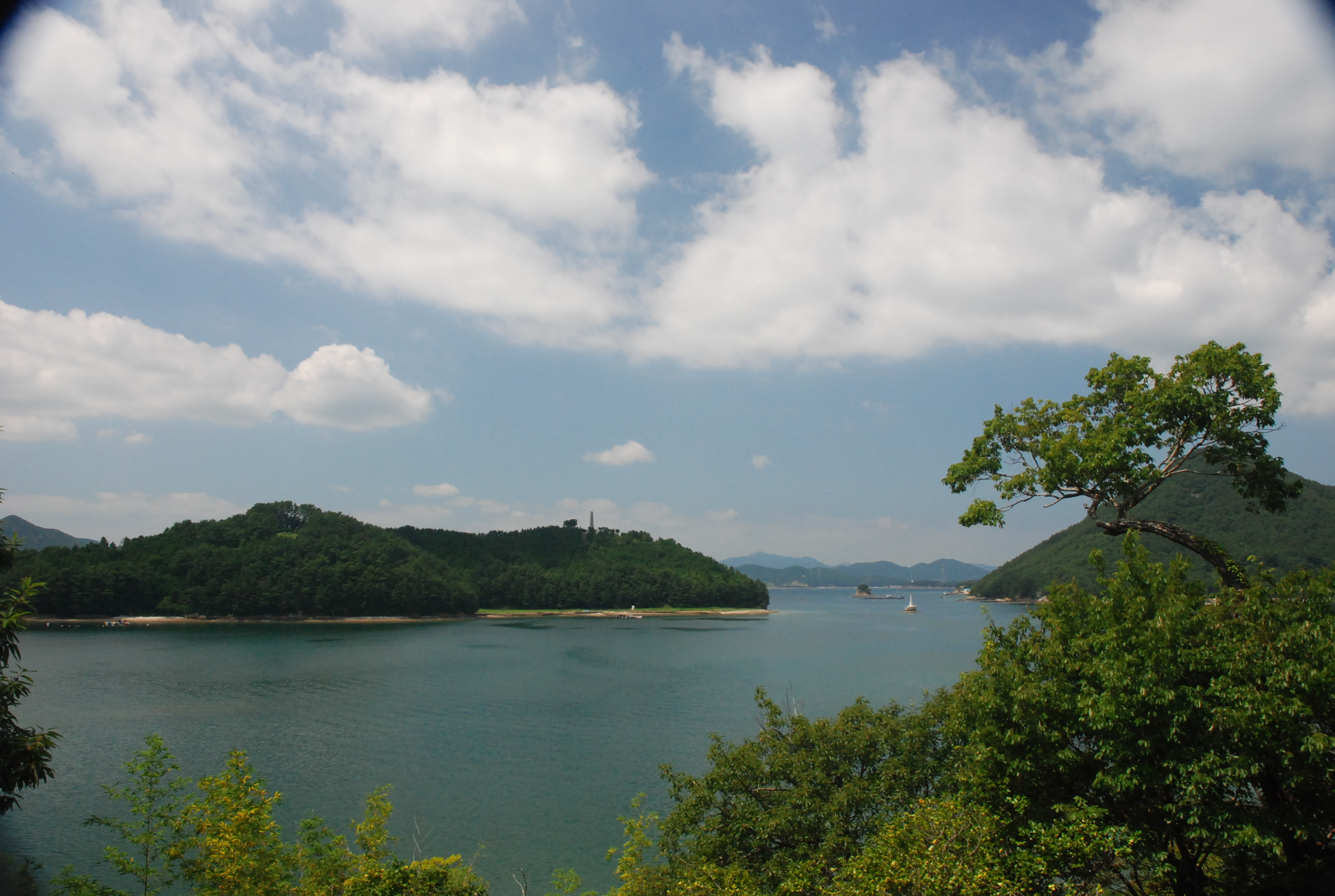
Hansando

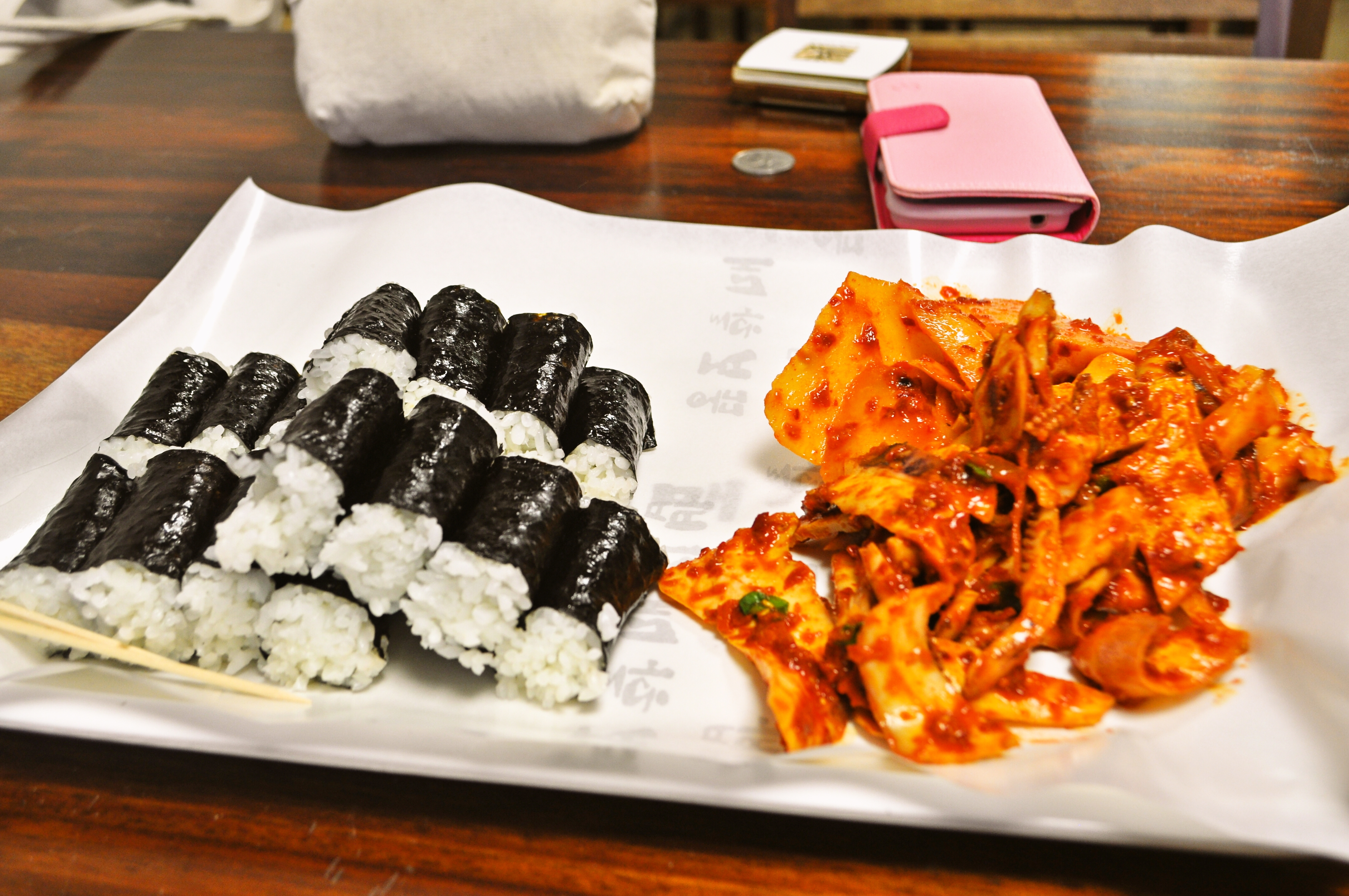
Tongyeong's famous food Chungmu gimbab

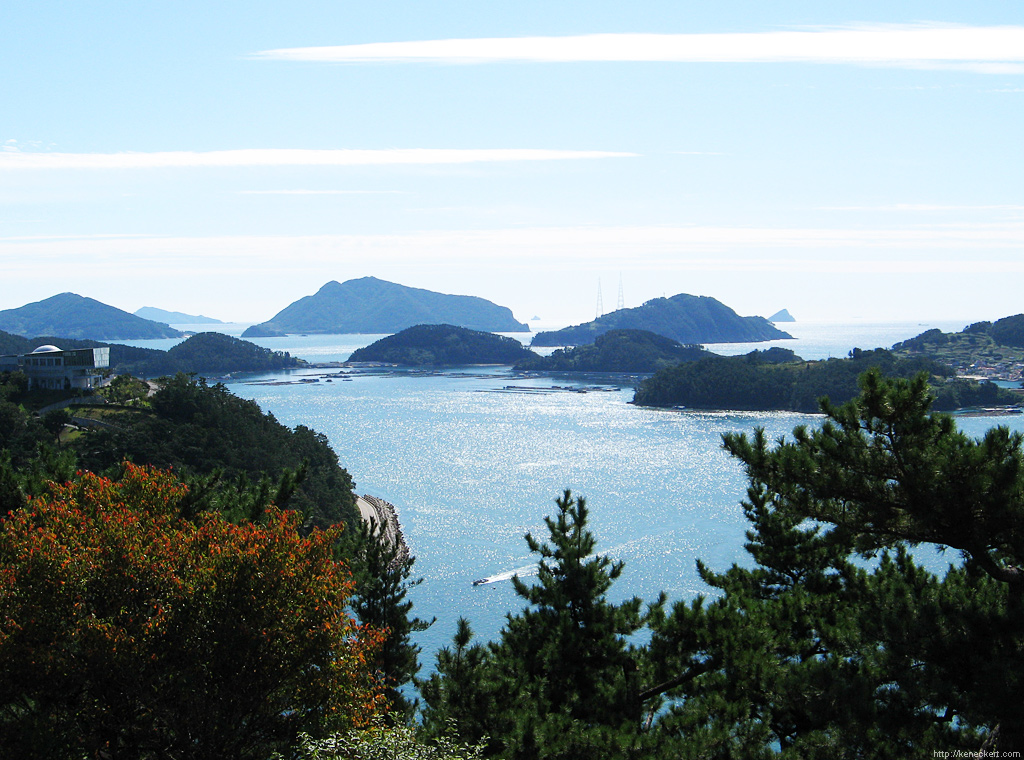
Tongyeong islands

== Twin towns – sister cities ==
Tongyeong is twinned with:

- Reedley, United States
- Rongcheng, China
- Samara, Russia
- Sayama, Japan
- Tamano, Japan
- Yunfu, China
- Yeosu, South Korea

== See also ==
- List of cities in South Korea
- Tongyeong International Music Festival
