= Gangguan Port =

South Korean harbor

Coordinates: 34°50′36″N 128°25′31″E

Gangguan Port (강구안), is a fishing harbour in Tongyeong, South Korea. The mountainous and maritime surroundings of the South Gyeongsang Province attract thousands of tourists.

== History ==
Turtle Ships led by Admiral Yi Sun-sin during mid-Joseon times, played an important role in naval battles against Japanese forces during the Imjin War. Battles included the 1597 Battle of Myeongnyang and the 1592 Battle of Hansando near Tongyeong. Following Yi Sun-sin's leadership, Tongyeong became a strategic naval hub, hosting the Tongyeong Samdo Sugun military district from 1604. This district served as a central naval station defending Gyeongsang, Jeolla, and Chungcheong provinces for Joseon.

The Chungryelsa Shrine, build in 1606, commemorates Yi's historic deeds. It houses Yi's spiritual tablet and tombstone, as well as records of his achievements as a naval commander. A statue of him is located on top of the Nammang-san mountain.

== Tourism ==
Gangguan tourism focuses on maritime culture, gastronomy and art. Many restaurants offer Chungmu-style gimbap, Tongyeong is famous for its honey bread stores, the restaurants serving seafood, like at the Joongang Conventional Fish Market, or for its korean coffee culture. The surrounding mountains and the maritime climate, as well as the Hallyeohaesang National Park are important attractions.

Tongyeong was designated as South Korea's first Night Tourism Specialized City in 2022. Plans for night tourism in the region include the expansion of nighttime outdoor events, such as "Tonight Tongyeong!" at Gangguan Port.

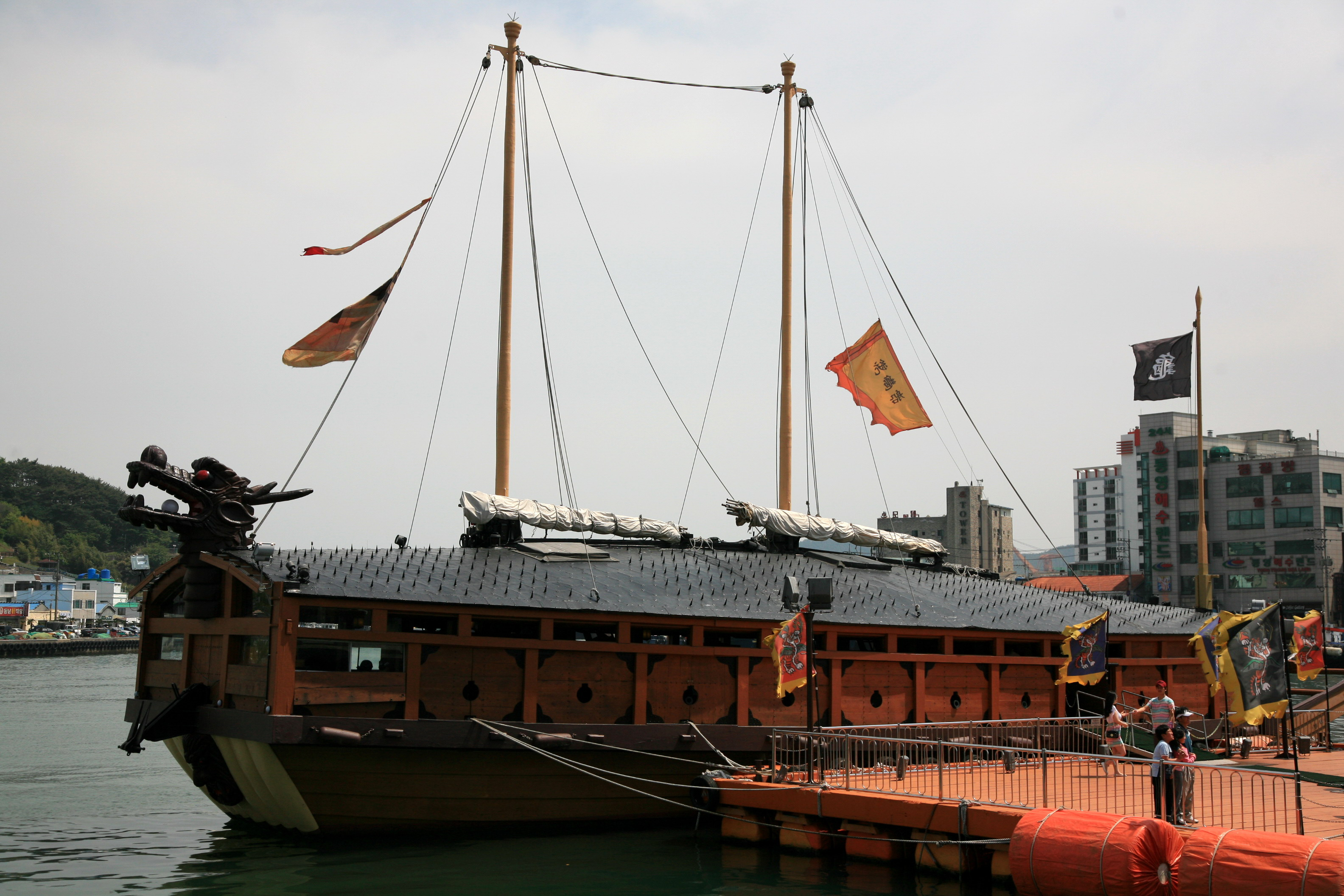
Replica of a Turtle Ship in Hallyeo National Marine Park in Tongyeong, South Korea

At night, Gangguan Port and Tongyeong are illuminated. The Dongbaek, an illuminated seagull statue, plays a significant role in promoting with holding a large sign of the night tourism slogan "Tonight TongYeong". The Gangguan Bride, crossing over the port, offers a view of the illuminated city.

Sight-seeing attractions include a restored turtle ship ("Geobukseon"). The port also serves as a point for harbor tours and trips to the neighboring islands, like to Sumaemuldo.
