= Battle of Danghangpo =

1592 Japan–Korea naval battle

Battle of Danghangpo Harbor
- Part of Imjin War
Date	12 July 1592
Location	Goseong or Jinhae, Korea
Result	Korean victory

Belligerents
Japanese fleet	Joseon

Commanders and leaders
Kato Kiyomasa; Ikoma Kazumasa	Yi Sunsin; Yi Ŏkki; Wŏn Kyun

Strength
26 ships: 9 large ships; 4 medium ships; 13 small ships	51 warships

Casualties and losses
26 ships	?

The Battle of Danghangpo was a naval engagement during the Japanese invasions of Korea (1592–98) that resulted in Korean victory.

== Background ==
After the Battle of Dangpo, Yi Sunsin spent the next few days searching for Japanese ships. He was then joined by Yi Ŏkki on 12 July 1592, increasing the total number of Korean warships to 51. That same day Yi Sunsin received a report that the Japanese fleet had been sighted near Danghangpo. He immediately sailed towards Danghangpo to confirm it himself. Anchored in the harbor of Danghangpo were 26 Japanese ships, including another flagship.

== Battle ==
The Korean fleet assumed a circular formation to navigate the enclosed bay and took turns bombarding the Japanese. Realizing that this would only force the Japanese to flee inland, Yi Sunsin ordered a false retreat. Falling for the ploy, the Japanese fleet gave chase, only to be surrounded and shot to splinters. Yi wrote:

Then our ships suddenly enveloped the enemy craft from the four directions, attacking them from both flanks at full speed. The turtle with the Flying Squadron Chief on board rammed the enemy's pavilion vessel once again, while wrecking it with cannon fire, and our other ships hit its brocade curtains and sails with fire arrows. Furious flames burst out and the enemy commander fell dead from an arrow hit".

A few Japanese managed to flee to shore and take refuge in the hills. All the Japanese ships were destroyed.

== Aftermath ==
The Korean fleet spent the next few days searching for Japanese ships but could not find any. On 18 July the fleet was dissolved and each commander returned to their respective ports.

== Bibliography ==
- Alagappa, Muthiah (2003), Asian Security Order: Instrumental and Normative Features, Stanford University Press, ISBN 0-8047-4629-X
- Arano, Yasunori (2005), The Formation of a Japanocentric World Order, International Journal of Asian Studies
- Brown, Delmer M. (May 1948), "The Impact of Firearms on Japanese Warfare, 1543–1598", The Far Eastern Quarterly, 7 (3), Association for Asian Studies: 236–53, doi:10.2307/2048846, JSTOR 2048846, S2CID 162924328
- Eikenberry, Karl W. (1988), "The Imjin War", Military Review, 68 (2): 74–82
- Ha, Tae-hung; Sohn, Pow-key (1977), 'Nanjung Ilgi: War Diary of Admiral Yi Sun-sin, Yonsei University Press, ISBN 89-7141-018-3
- Haboush, JaHyun Kim (2016), The Great East Asian War and the Birth of the Korean Nation
- Hawley, Samuel (2005), The Imjin War, The Royal Asiatic Society, Korea Branch/UC Berkeley Press, ISBN 89-954424-2-5
- Jang, Pyun-soon (1998), Noon-eu-ro Bo-nen Han-gook-yauk-sa 5: Gor-yeo Si-dae (눈으로 보는 한국역사 5: 고려시대), Park Doo-ui, Bae Keum-ram, Yi Sang-mi, Kim Ho-hyun, Kim Pyung-sook, et al., Joog-ang Gyo-yook-yaun-goo-won. 1998-10-30. Seoul, Korea.
- Kim, Ki-chung (Fall 1999), "Resistance, Abduction, and Survival: The Documentary Literature of the Imjin War (1592–8)", Korean Culture, 20 (3): 20–29
- Kim, Yung-sik (1998), "Problems and Possibilities in the Study of the History of Korean Science", Osiris, 2nd Series, 13: 48–79, doi:10.1086/649280, JSTOR 301878, S2CID 143724260
- 桑田忠親 [Kuwata, Tadachika], ed., 舊參謀本部編纂, [Kyu Sanbo Honbu], 朝鮮の役 [Chousen no Eki] (日本の戰史 [Nihon no Senshi] Vol. 5), 1965.
- Neves, Jaime Ramalhete (1994), "The Portuguese in the Im-Jim War?", Review of Culture, 18: 20–24
- Niderost, Eric (June 2001), "Turtleboat Destiny: The Imjin War and Yi Sun Shin", Military Heritage, 2 (6): 50–59, 89
- Niderost, Eric (January 2002), "The Miracle at Myongnyang, 1597", Osprey Military Journal, 4 (1): 44–50
- Park, Yune-hee (1973), Admiral Yi Sun-shin and His Turtleboat Armada: A Comprehensive Account of the Resistance of Korea to the 16th Century Japanese Invasion, Shinsaeng Press
- Rockstein, Edward D. (1993), Strategic And Operational Aspects of Japan's Invasions of Korea 1592–1598 1993-6-18, Naval War College
- Sadler, A. L. (June 1937), "The Naval Campaign in the Korean War of Hideyoshi (1592–1598)", Transactions of the Asiatic Society of Japan, Second Series, 14: 179–208
- Sansom, George (1961), A History of Japan 1334–1615, Stanford University Press, ISBN 0-8047-0525-9
- Sohn, Pow-key (April–June 1959), "Early Korean Painting", Journal of the American Oriental Society, 79 (2): 96–103, doi:10.2307/595851, JSTOR 595851
- Stramigioli, Giuliana (December 1954), "Hideyoshi's Expansionist Policy on the Asiatic Mainland", Transactions of the Asiatic Society of Japan, Third Series, 3: 74–116
- Strauss, Barry (Summer 2005), "Korea's Legendary Admiral", MHQ: The Quarterly Journal of Military History, 17 (4): 52–61
- Swope, Kenneth M. (2006), "Beyond Turtleboats: Siege Accounts from Hideyoshi's Second Invasion of Korea, 1597–1598", Sungkyun Journal of East Asian Studies, 6 (2), Academy of East Asian Studies: 177–206
- Swope, Kenneth M. (2005), "Crouching Tigers, Secret Weapons: Military Technology Employed During the Sino-Japanese-Korean War, 1592–1598", The Journal of Military History, 69, Society for Military History: 11–42, doi:10.1353/jmh.2005.0059, S2CID 159829515
- Swope, Kenneth M. (December 2002), "Deceit, Disguise, and Dependence: China, Japan, and the Future of the Tributary System, 1592–1596", The International History Review, 24 (4): 757–1008, doi:10.1080/07075332.2002.9640980, S2CID 154827808
- Swope, Kenneth M. (2009), A Dragon's Head and a Serpent's Tail: Ming China and the First Great East Asian War, 1592–1598, University of Oklahoma Press
- Turnbull, Stephen (2002), Samurai Invasion: Japan's Korean War 1592–98, Cassell & Co, ISBN 0-304-35948-3
- Turnbull, Stephen (2008), The Samurai Invasion of Korea 1592-98, Osprey Publishing Ltd
- Turnbull, Stephen (1998), The Samurai Sourcebook, Cassell & Co, ISBN 1-85409-523-4
- Villiers, John (1980), SILK and Silver: Macau, Manila and Trade in the China Seas in the Sixteenth Century (A lecture delivered to the Hong Kong Branch of the Royal Asiatic Society at the Hong Kong Club. 10 June 1980)
- Yi, Min-woong (2004), Imjin Wae-ran Haejeonsa: The Naval Battles of the Imjin War [임진왜란 해전사], Chongoram Media [청어람미디어], ISBN 89-89722-49-7
