= Goseong County, South Gyeongsang =

Coordinates: 34°58′32″N 128°19′12″E

Goseong
- County
- Panoramic view of Goseong-eup

- Flag Emblem of Goseong

- Location in South Korea
- Country: South Korea
- Region: Yeongnam
- Administrative divisions: 1 eup, 13 myeon

Area
  - Total: 660.71 km^{2} (255.10 sq mi)

Population (September 2024)
  - Total: 48,356
  - Density: 116.8/km^{2} (303/sq mi)
  - Dialect: Gyeongsang

Korean name
- Hangul: 고성군
- Hanja: 固城郡
- RR: Goseong-gun
- MR: Kosŏng-gun

Goseong County (Korean: 고성군) is a county in South Gyeongsang Province, South Korea.

== Administrative divisions ==
Goseong-gun is divided into 1 eup and 13 myeon.

- Goseong-eup
- Daega-myeon
- Donghae-myeon
- Gaecheon-myeon
- Georyu-myeon
- Guman-myeon
- Hai-myeon
- Hail-myeon
- Heohwa-myeon
- Maan-myeon
- Samsan-myeon
- Sangri-myeon
- Yeonghyeon-myeon
- Yeongo-myeon

== Location ==
Goseong-gun is located at the southern end of central Gyeongnam. It was the capital of Sogaya, an ancient kingdom of advanced culture. It is endowed with natural tourism resources of beautiful mountains, ocean, and fields.

It is adjacent to Geoje, Sacheon, Tongyeong, Masan, and Jinju. It is also linked to the Daejeon-Tongyeong Expressway, National Roads No. 14 and No. 33.

== Climate ==
Its location is quite southern, which makes the climate mild and warm all year around. That is, Goseong is classified as an oceanic climate. The southeast wind blows during the summer and the northwest wind, which is the seasonal wind, blows during the winter.

== Festival ==
Goseong was the center of the Kaya confederacy in late antiquity. Goseong holds an annual Sogaya festival in celebration of this history.

Events also deal with Yi Sun-sin, a general officer of Joseon's navy during the Imjin War, who beat the Japanese forces of Toyotomi Hideyoshi at Battle of Danghangpo on 12 July 1592 off the coast of Goseong.

The county hosts the Gyeongnam Goseong Dinosaur World Expo.

== Cluster ==
Goseong was designated as a cluster for shipbuilding, including development with its neighbor, Geoje area.

In July 2007, the Ministry of Finance and Economy confirmed the establishment of the complex after securing the land. The construction began in April 2008.

== Fossil sites ==
Goseong is known for, among other things, its fossilized dinosaur footprints. The county will host the Gyeongnam Goseong Dinosaur World Expo in 2016 for 73 days, between 1 April and 12 June, at Danghangpo Tourist Site and Sangjogam County Park. Goseong county participated in the International dinosaur festival of Zigong, Sichuan, China, which is a sister city.

The whole area was on the way to propel registration of UNESCO natural heritages with other southern coast-lying regions. Fossil sites on the southern coast of Korea are the largest scale in Asia.

== Tourist attractions ==
- Goseong Dinosaur Museum
- Sangjokam County Park
- Goseong Ogwangdae - Korea Mask Dance Drama
- Danghangpo Tourist Resort
- Mt. Yeonhwa Provincial Park
- Namsan Park
- Okcheon Temple
- Munsuam
- Songhakdong Gobungun - presumed to be tombs of political leaders of the Gaya period around A.D. 600.
- Unheung Temple
- Jangui Temple
- Mt. Geumtae Gyesung Temple

== Agricultural and Marine Products ==
- Agricultural products: Dinosaur land rice, green pumpkin, hot pepper, sweet persimmon, pumpkin, chinamul, mushroom, cherry tomato, Goseong persimmon, strawberry
- Marine products: anchovy, Goseong Gaetjangeo (hamo) Hoe - raw fish, giant prawn, oyster.

== Notable people ==
- Jung Jung-suk (1982-2011) was a South Korean women's football player.
- Kim Cheong (1941–Present) is a poet and writer.
- Yu Song-jin (born 1964/1965), South Korean engineer

== Sister cities ==
- Yeongdeungpo, South Korea
- Zigong, China
- Kasaoka, Japan

== See also ==
- Sim Bong-geun, Goseong native and President of Dong-A University.
- Danghangpo Battle, a battle that happen in modern Danghang-ri, Hoehwa-myeon.
