= Yu Song-jin =

South Korean engineer

- 유성진
- Born: 1964 or 1965 (age 61–62); Goseong, Gyeongsangnam-do
- Employer: Hyundai Asan
- Known for: 137-day detention by North Korea

Korean name
- Hangul: 유성진
- RR: Yu Seongjin
- MR: Yu Sŏngjin

Yu Song-jin (Korean: 유성진; born 1964 or 1965) is a South Korean engineer detained for four-and-a-half months in 2009 by North Korea.

== Detention ==
A native of Goseong, Gyeongsangnam-do, Yu was employed by Hyundai Asan in the Kaesong Industrial Complex. He was detained on March 30, 2009, after allegedly "slandering the system of the DPRK" and inciting a waitress to defect to South Korea. He was freed in August 2009 after 137 days of captivity when Hyundai Group chairwoman Hyun Jeong-eun went to the North to negotiate for his release.

== Legacy ==
The imprisonment is thought to be partially responsible for reducing the volume of trade between North Korea and South Korea in recent years.
