= Hansando =

Island in South Gyeonsang Province, South Korea

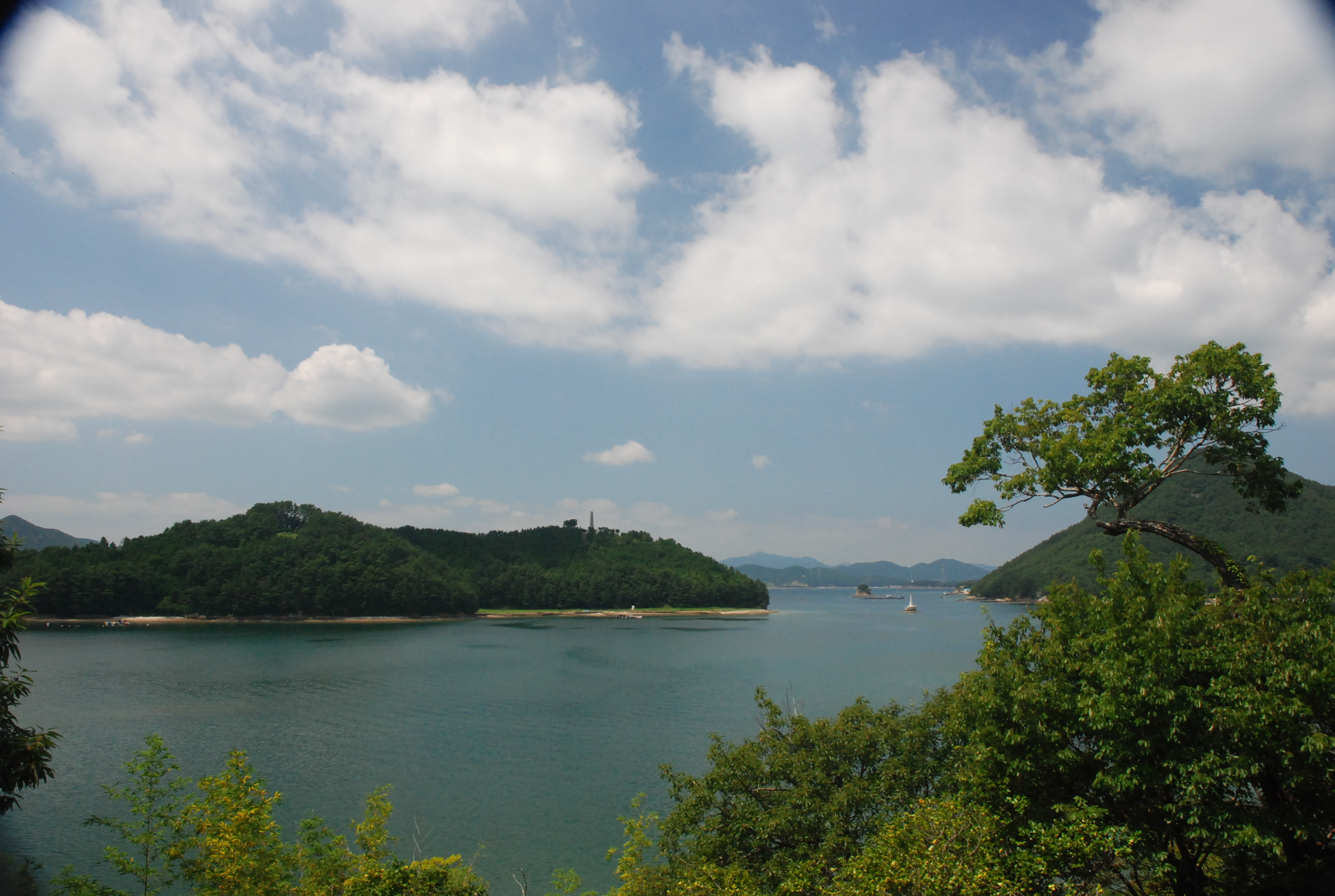
- Interactive map of Hansando

Geography
- Coordinates: 34.7818°N 128.485°E

Administration
- South Korea
- Province: South Gyeongsang Province

Korean name
- Hangul: 한산도
- Hanja: 閑山島
- RR: Hansando
- MR: Hansando

Hansando (Korean: 한산도), also Hansan Island, is an island in South Gyeongsang Province, South Korea. It is across a relatively narrow strait from Chungmu on the Tongyeong Peninsula.

== History ==
The area to the south-east of the island was the site of the Battle of Hansan Island during the Imjin War where Admiral Yi Sun-Sin decisively defeated the main Japanese war fleet led by Wakizaka Yasuharu. Following the battle, Admiral Yi moved his main naval base from Yeosu to Hansan Island, as it was strategically advantageous for conducting surveillance and reconnaissance of the nearby Gyeonnaeryang Strait (견내량, 見乃梁), which was an inland route leading directly to the main Japanese base located at Busan.

After King Seonjo ordered Admiral Yi Sun-sin's arrest, imprisonment, and torture, Admiral Wŏn Kyun was assigned to lead the Korean navy. However, Wŏn Kyun attacked the Japanese base at Busan, ignoring the tides, and was forced to retreat owing to shelling from the shore. The Japanese navy pursued him relentlessly and sank all but thirteen of the Panokseon in the process. Wŏn Kyun was killed during this disastrous retreat, and Hansan Island, and its evacuated naval base, was exposed to the Japanese forces, who eventually burned it down. After the war, Joseon naval base was reconstructed, Yi was rehabilitated, and went on to defeat the Japanese with the remaining 13 Panokseon.

== Tourism ==
- Oehang Village Pine Forest
