= Turtle ship =

15th–19th century type of Korean warship

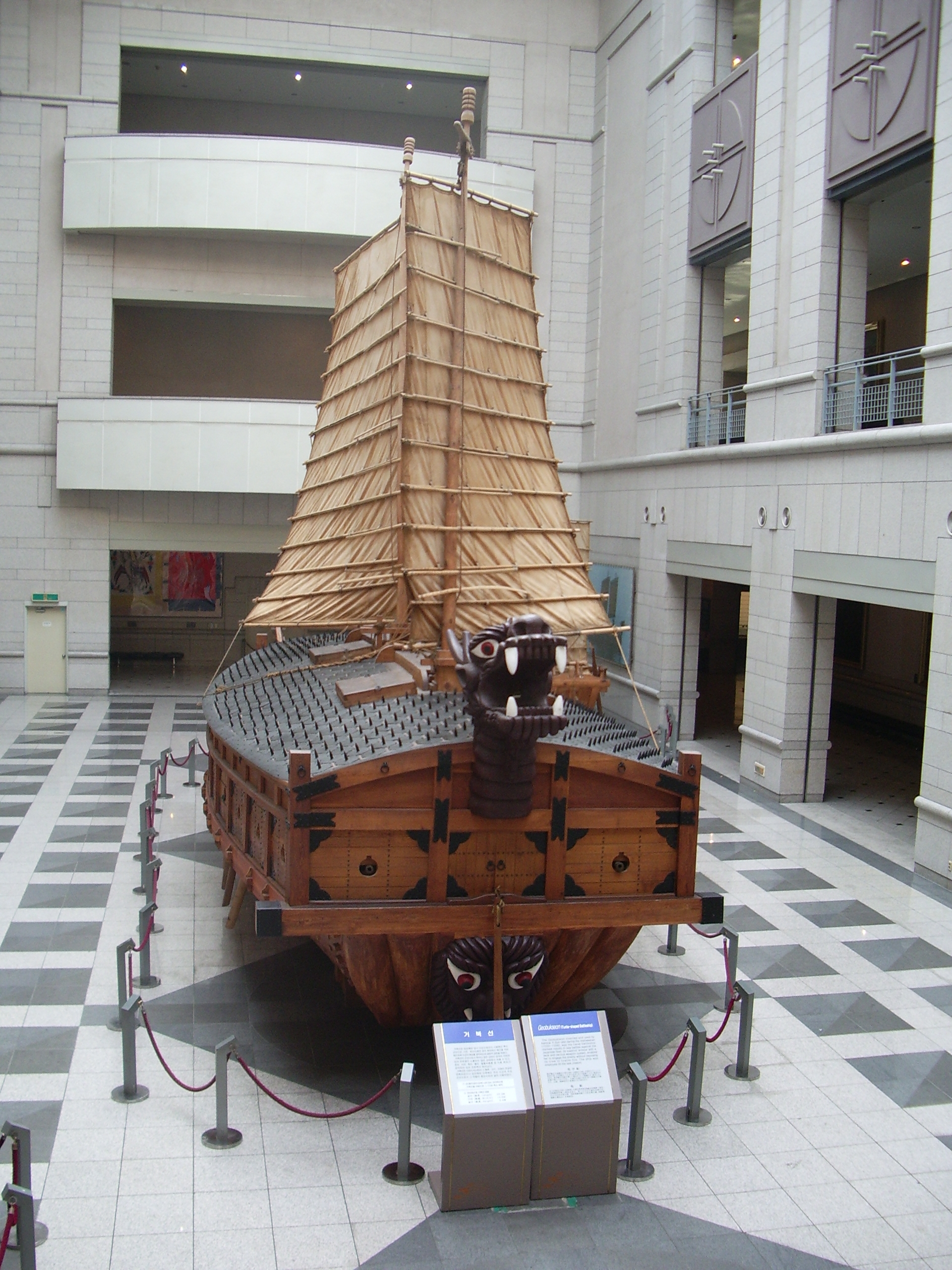
Model of a turtle ship in the War Memorial of Korea

A turtle ship (Korean: 거북선; RR: geobukseon; Korean pronunciation: [kʌ.buk̚.s͈ʌn]) was a type of warship that was used by the Korean Joseon Navy from the early 15th century up until the 19th century. They were used alongside the panokseon warships in the fight against invading Japanese fleets. The ship's name derives from its covering that was said to resemble a turtle shell. Some historians have described it as a very early type of ironclad though the historical evidence for this is uncertain.

== History ==
The first references to older, first-generation turtle ships, known as gwiseon (귀선; 龜船, Korean pronunciation: [kɥisʌn]), come from 1413 and 1415 records in the Annals of the Joseon Dynasty, which mention a mock battle between a gwiseon and a Japanese warship. However, these early turtle ships soon fell out of use as Korea's naval preparedness decreased during a long period of relative peace.

Turtle ships participated in the war against Japanese naval forces supporting Toyotomi Hideyoshi's attempts to conquer Korea from 1592 to 1598. Korean Admiral Yi Sun-sin, who won all battles against the Japanese Navy, is credited with designing the improved turtle ship. From their first appearance in the Battle of Sacheon, his turtle ships contributed to winning 16 battles against the Japanese fleet under the command of various Daimyos primarily from Western Japan, though under the command of Wŏn Kyun the Joseon Navy suffered a devastating defeat in the Battle of Chilcheollyang. It is unknown precisely how many of Yi's Turtle Ships were constructed. The cost of one of these armored warships would have been high, especially if the deck was lined with hexagonal iron plates as some sources suggest.

== Design and construction ==
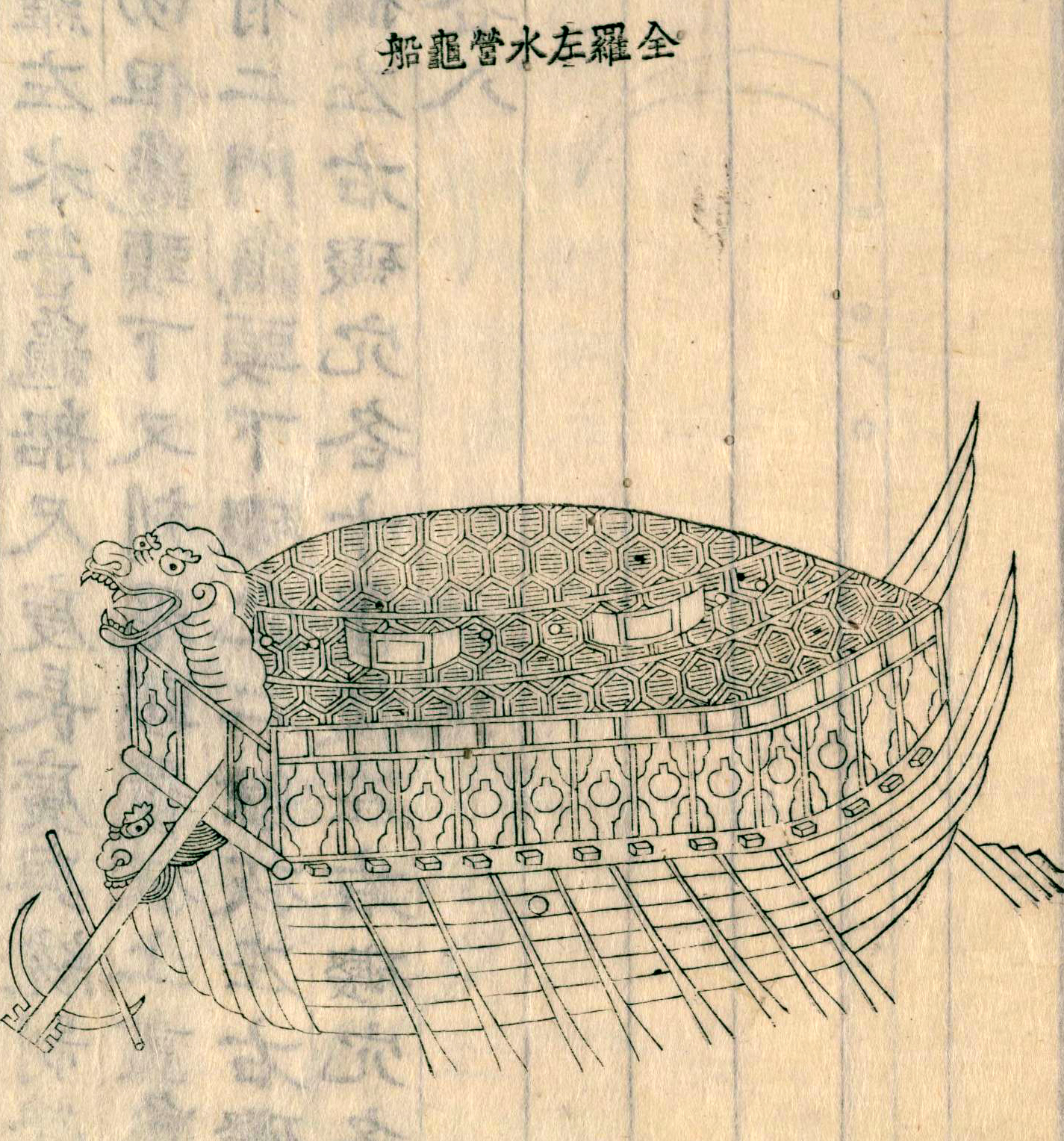
Depiction of 1795 ship considered to resemble Yi's 1592 version.

Later turtle ships show some structural changes from earlier versions. For example, later iterations of the turtle ship had a higher bulwark height. This alteration in the design was made so that more bulwark slots could be added. In turn, these slots could be used for additional weaponry or ventilation for the vessel's occupants. Early illustrations also show initial versions of the ship consisting of overlapping planks on the deck structure, while later depictions show the deck of the vessel covered with flush, hexagonal plates made of wood or iron. Nonetheless, in both earlier and later versions, the turtle ship was designed to be surprisingly fast, as it was both oar and sail-powered.

=== Roofing ===
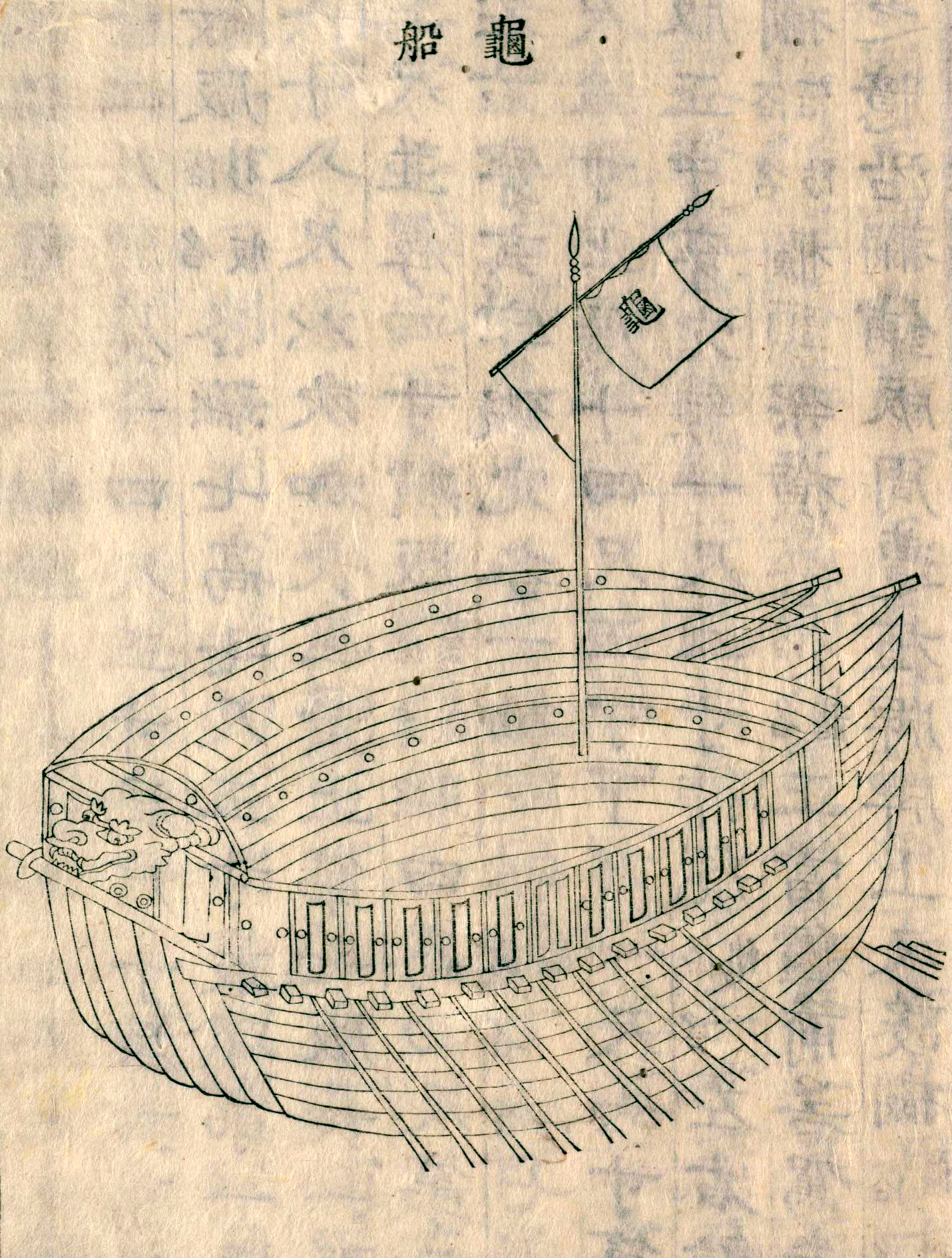
Estimation of the early 15th century turtle ship according to an illustration from 1795

There are non-contemporary sources that state that the turtle ship was covered with metal plates,. While it is clear from the available sources that the roof of the ship was covered with iron spikes to prevent boarding, there is split opinion among historians on whether the turtle ship was ironclad.

There are no contemporary Korean sources from Yi Sun-sin's time that refer to the turtle ship as ironclad. One Japanese chronicle mentions a clash in August 1592 which involved three Korean turtle ships "covered in iron," but this could refer to the iron spikes protruding from their roofs. Historian Stephen Turnbull, however, points out the fact that in February 1593 the Japanese government ordered the military to use an iron plate in building ships, possibly in response to the Korean attacks.

Samuel Hawley has suggested that the idea of ironclad turtle ships has its origins in the writings of late 19th-century Westerners returning from Korea. The progression from simple comparison to a statement that the turtle ships anticipated the modern ironclad by centuries can be roughly charted in retrospect, starting no earlier than ca. 1880. Coming in touch with local tales of ancient armored ships in a period which saw the rise of Western-type ironclad warship to global prominence, these authors may have naturally conjured up the image of metal armor instead of a more traditional heavy timber shell. For instance, during the General Sherman incident, the Koreans initially constructed an improvised turtle ship, which was protected by metal sheeting and cowhides to destroy General Sherman but failed to penetrate its iron hull at the cost of one of their sailors. When the French Navy threatened Korea, the government ordered an ironclad ship be built "like the turtle ship." However, despite all efforts the design failed to float. Turnbull believes that the 19th-century experience should not rule out a "limited amount of armor plating in 1592".

=== Spikes ===
Metal spikes were used to cover the top of the turtle ship to deter boarding tactics used by the Japanese. According to historical records, the spikes were covered with empty rice sacks or rice mats to lure the Japanese into trying to board, since the boarding would appear safe. However, modern authors have found this to be unlikely since such an arrangement would have invited enemy fire arrows.

== Armament ==
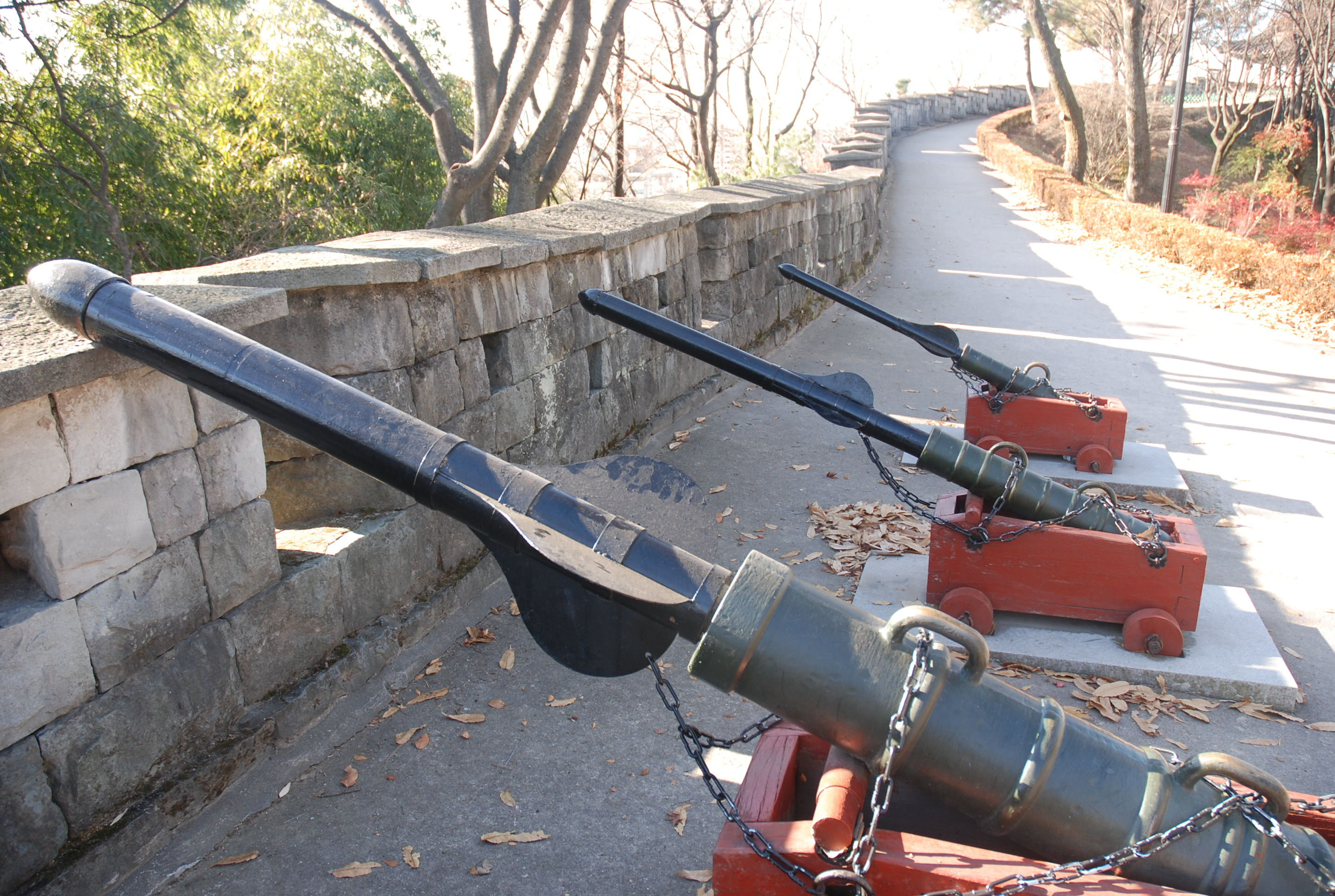
Three large Chongtong at the Jinju Fortress museum. The closest is a cheonja-chongtong, the second is a jija-chongtong, and the third is a hyeonja-chongtong.

The turtle ship was equipped with cheonja "heaven", jija "earth", hyeonja "black", and hwangja "yellow" type chongtong (Joseon cannons). There was also an arquebus known as seungja (victory). The seungja ranged 200 metres (660 ft) while the hwangja was the lightest but with a range of 1,200 metres (3,900 ft). According to Hae-Ill Bak, one Japanese record of the Battle of Angolpo records the experience of two Japanese commanders on July 9, 1592, in their battle against turtle ships: "their (turtle ships') attack continued until about 6 o'clock in the afternoon by firing large fire-arrows through repeated alternate approaches, even as close as 18–30 feet. As a result, almost every part of our ships—the turret, the passages and the side shielding—were totally destroyed..."

A dragon's head was placed on the top of the ship at the bow. Several different versions of the dragon's head were used on the turtle ships. The dragon's head was first placed as an early form of psychological warfare in order to scare Japanese soldiers. One version carried a projector that could release a dense toxic smoke to obscure vision and interfere with the Japanese ability to maneuver and coordinate properly.

== Modern reconstructions ==
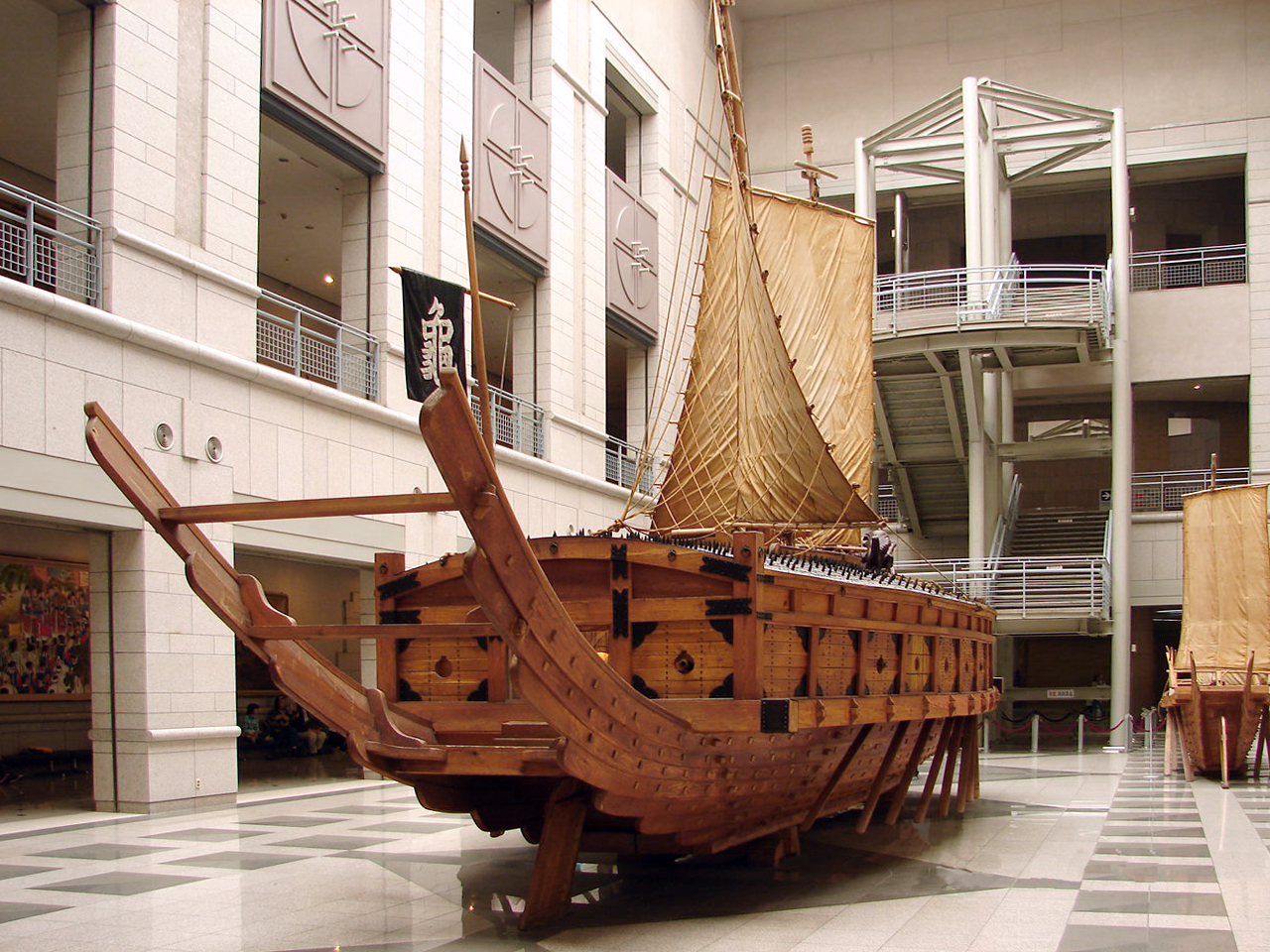
Turtle Ship in Seoul

A turtle ship has been reconstructed by Geobukseon Research Center (거북선연구원), a private commercial company. They have done extensive research on the original design of the turtle ship, and made several real-size reconstructions of them for commercial use. These were deployed in a Korean drama, The Immortal Admiral Yi Sun-sin.

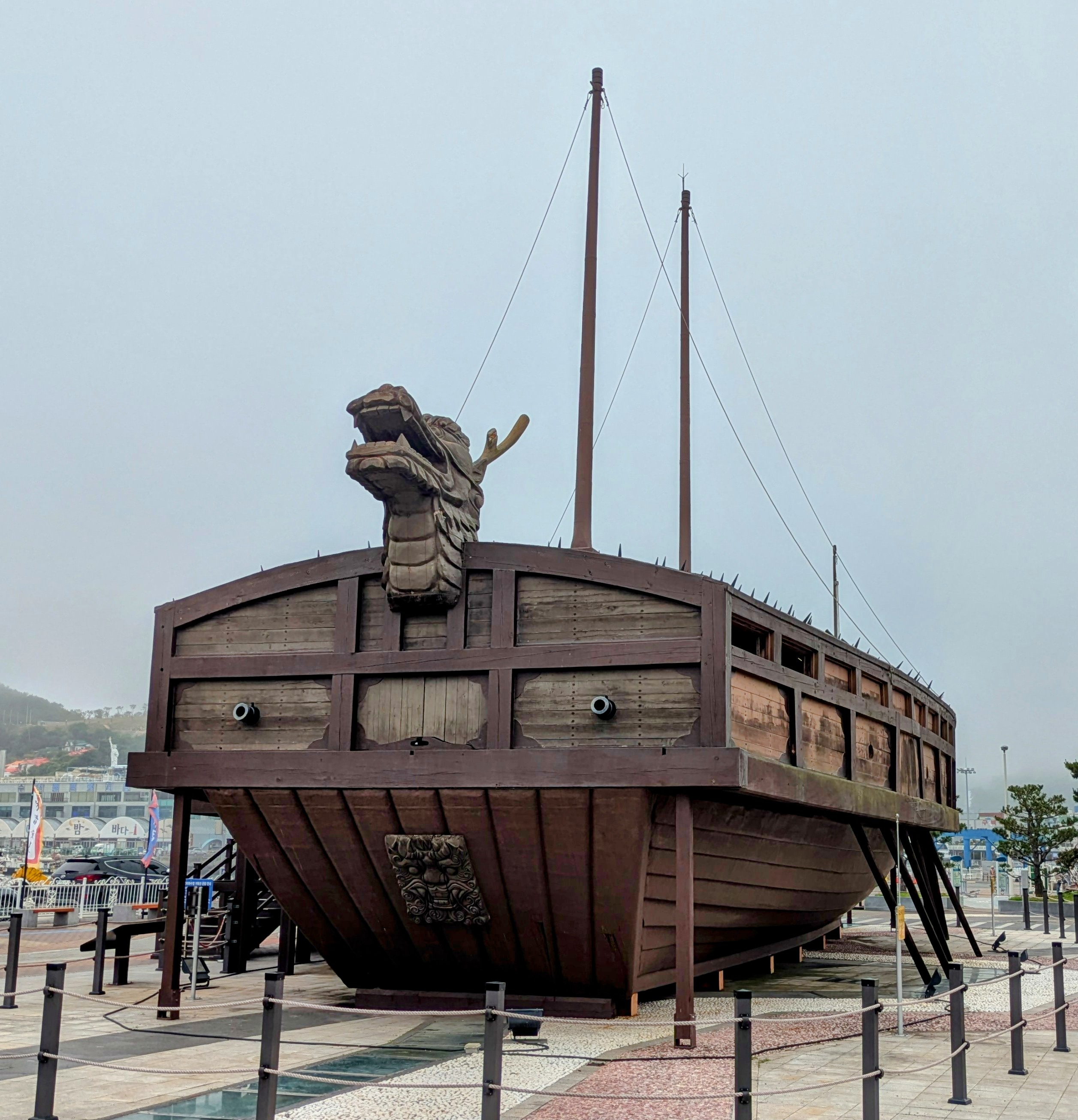
Reconstructed Korean turtle ship at Yeosu harbor.

Several museums host turtle ships on display, and people can visit and go inside 1:1 scale turtle ships that are anchored at Yeosu and Tongyeong . North Korean delegations to the south seem to be more reserved about the significance of its historical role.

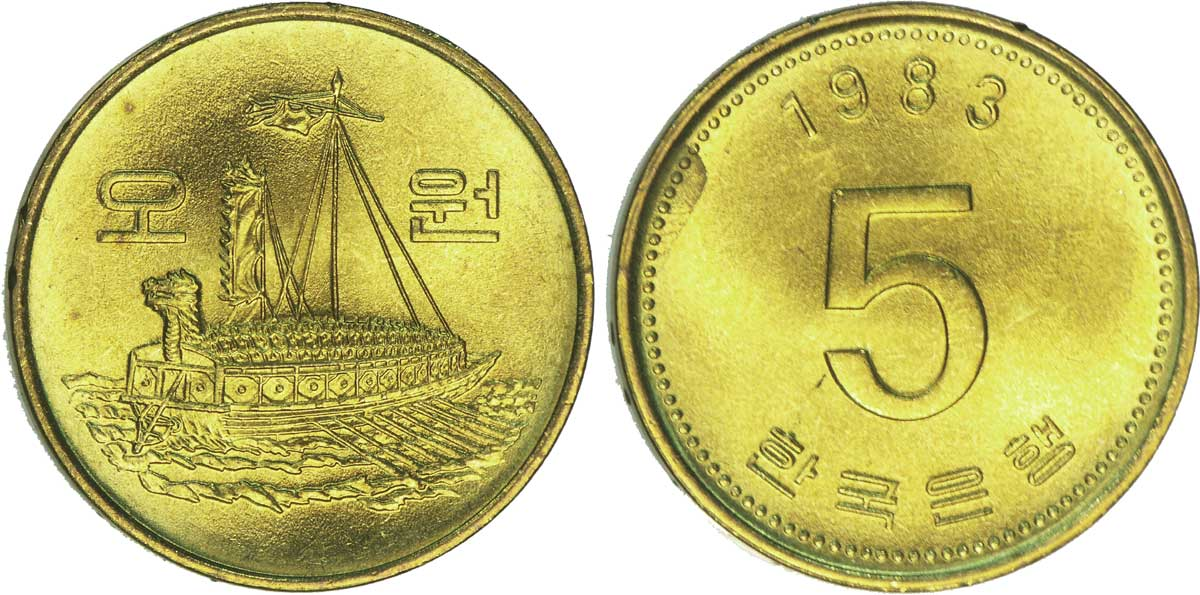
Turtle ship, as featured on the 5 Won coin.

== See also ==
- Djong
- Hwacha
- Military history of Korea
- Mong Dong
- Na Dae-yong
- Singijeon

== Sources ==
- Korean Spirit and Culture Promotion Project: "Admiral Yi Sun-sin. A Brief Overview of his Life and Achievements" KSCPP, Korean Spirit and Culture I, ISBN 0-9779613-1-1
- Hawley, Samuel (2005), The Imjin War. Japan's Sixteenth-Century Invasion of Korea and Attempt to Conquer China, Seoul, South Korea: The Royal Asiatic Society, Korea Branch, ISBN 89-954424-2-5
- Holz, Heidi (August 2009), "Complementary Keys to Naval Victory", Naval History Magazine, vol. 23, no. 4
- Needham, Joseph (1971), Science, and civilization in China: Vol. 4, Physics and physical technology. Pt. 3, Civil engineering and nautics., Cambridge University Press, ISBN 978-0-521-07060-7
- Nolan, Cathal J. (2006), The age of wars of religion, 1000-1650: an encyclopedia of global warfare and civilization, Greenwood Publishing Group, ISBN 978-0-313-33734-5
- Swope, Kenneth M (January 2005), "Crouching Tigers, Secret Weapons: Military Technology Employed During the Sino-Japanese-Korean War, 1592–1598", The Journal of Military History, 69 (1): 11–42, doi:10.1353/jmh.2005.0059, S2CID 159829515
- Turnbull, Stephen (2002), Samurai Invasion. Japan's Korean War 1592-98, London: Cassell & Co, ISBN 0-304-35948-3
- Turnbull, Stephen (2003), Fighting ships of the Far East: Japan and Korea AD 612-1639, Osprey Publishing, pp. 38–41, ISBN 978-1-84176-478-8
