= Chilean submarine Simpson =

Simpson is the name of the following submarines of the Chilean Navy:

- Chilean submarine Simpson (1944), ex-USS Spot, a Balao-class submarine, decommissioned in 1982
- Chilean submarine Simpson (1982), a Type 209 submarine, in active service

== See also ==
- Chilean ship Almirante Simpson
- Simpson (disambiguation)
