= Chilean submarine Thomson =

Two submarines of the Chilean Navy have borne the name Thomson, named after Chilean naval officer Manuel Thomson.

- Chilean submarine Thomson (SS-22) a Balao-class submarine launched as USS Springer in 1944, renamed on acquisition by Chile in 1961 and serving until 1972
- Chilean submarine Thomson (SS-20) a Type 209 submarine launched in 1982
