= BAP Islay =

Diesel-electric submarine of the Peruvian Navy (built 1971)

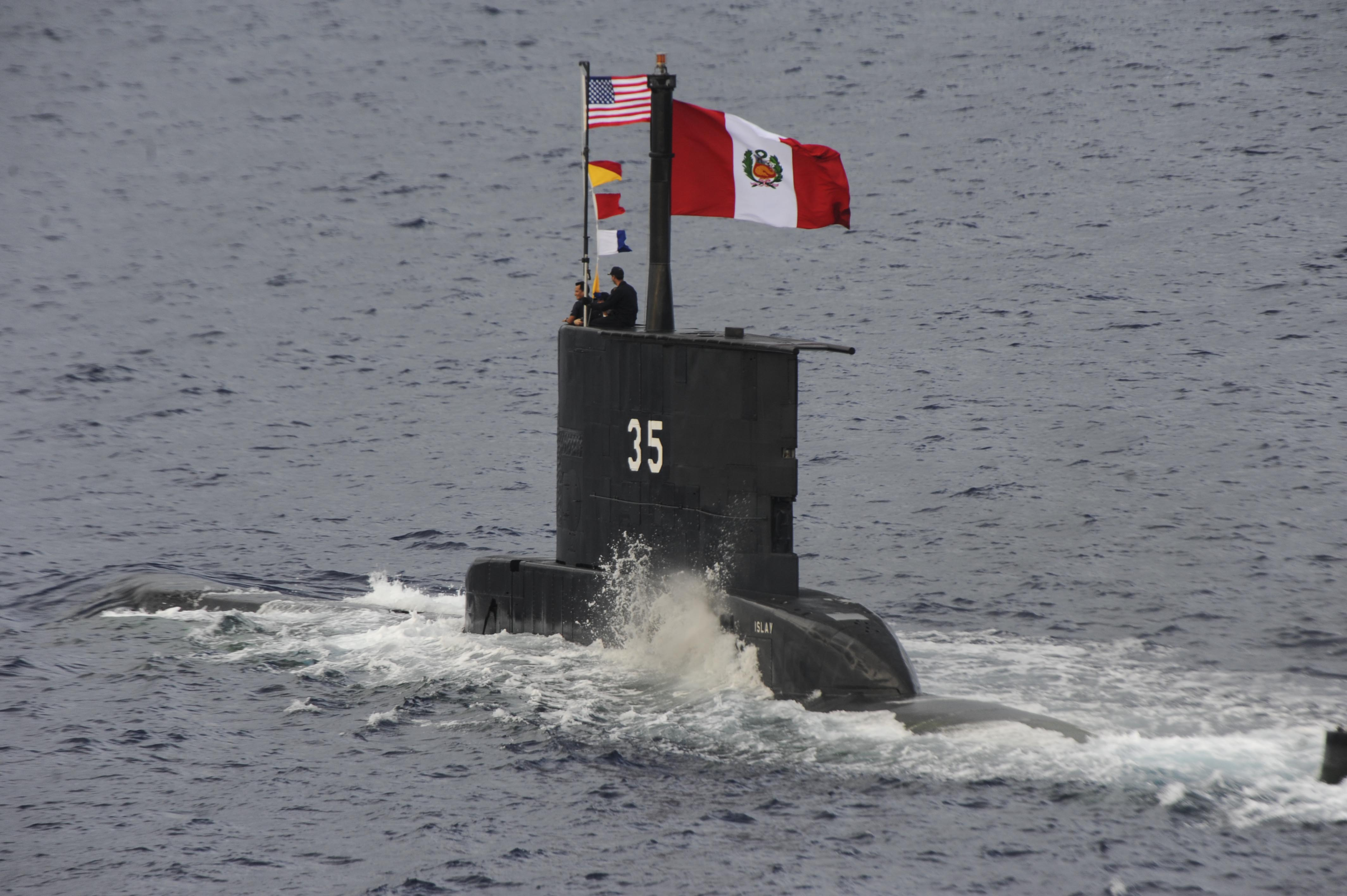

History
- Ordered: 24 June 1970
- Builder: Howaldtswerke Deutsche Werft AG
- Laid down: 15 March 1971
- Launched: 11 October 1973
- Commissioned: 29 August 1974
- Home port: Callao
- Motto: Honor y coraje

General characteristics
- Displacement: 1,180 t surfaced; 1,285 t submerged
- Length: 55.9 m
- Beam: 6.4 m
- Draft: 5.9 m
- Propulsion: 4 MTU Type 12V493 AZ80 GA31L diesel engines; 1 Siemens electric motor; 1 shaft; 4,600 hp (3,400 kW)
- Speed: 11 knots surfaced; 21 knots (39 km/h) submerged
- Range: 11,300 nm surfaced at 4 knots (7.4 km/h)
- Endurance: 40 days on patrol
- Complement: 7 officers, 29 enlisted
- Armament: 8 × 21 in (533 mm) torpedo tubes; 14 SST-4 torpedoes

BAP Islay (SS-35) is one of two Type 209/1100 submarines ordered by the Peruvian Navy on 24 June 1970. She was built by the German shipbuilder Howaldtswerke Deutsche Werft AG at its shipyard in Kiel. She is named after the Battle of Islay which took place between naval forces of Peru and Chile on 12 January 1838. Following sea trials in the North Sea, she arrived to its homeport of Callao in 1974. After almost a decade in service she was overhauled in Kiel in 1983 for further use.

== Sources ==
- Baker III, Arthur D., The Naval Institute Guide to Combat Fleets of the World 2002-2003. Naval Institute Press, 2002.
- Ortiz Sotelo, Jorge, Apuntes para la historia de los submarinos peruanos. Biblioteca Nacional, 2001.
- Scheina, Robert L. & Smigelski, Adam (1995). "Peru". In Chumbley, Stephen (ed.). Conway's All the World's Fighting Ships, 1947–1995 (revised ed.). Naval Institute Press. pp. 303–307. ISBN 1-55750-132-7.
