= ARA Salta (S-31) =

1973 Argentine Navy attack submarine

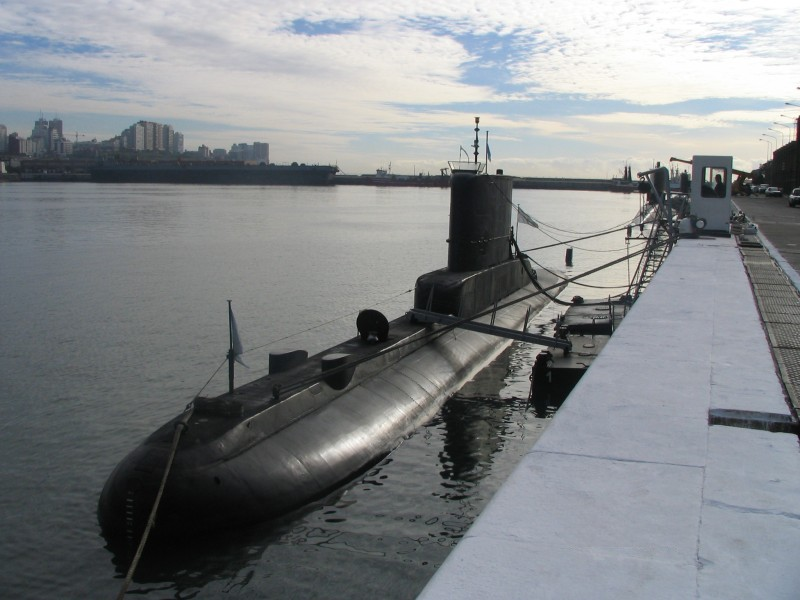
- Type 209 submarine ARA Salta (S-31)

History

Argentina
- Name: ARA Salta
- Builder: Howaldtswerke-Deutsche Werft, Germany
- Completed: 12 November 1972
- Commissioned: 9 February 1973
- Identification: S31
- Status: Used as training platform at dockside

General characteristics
- Class & type: Type 209 submarine
- Displacement: 1,000 tonnes (Surfaced); 1,207 tonnes (Submerged)
- Length: 54.1 m (177 ft 6 in)
- Beam: 6.2 m (20 ft 4 in)
- Draught: 5.5 m (18 ft 1 in)
- Propulsion: Diesel-electric, 4 diesels, 1 shaft
- Speed: 11 knots (20 km/h; 13 mph) surfaced; 21.5 knots (39.8 km/h; 24.7 mph) submerged
- Range: 11,000 nmi (20,000 km; 13,000 mi) at 10 knots (19 km/h; 12 mph); surfaced (22,000 km at 15 km/h)
- Endurance: 50 days
- Crew: 31
- Sensors & processing systems: Passive sonar AN-525 A6; Active sonar AN-407 A9
- Armament: 8 × 533 mm (21 in) torpedo tubes; 22 torpedoes

ARA Salta (S-31) is a Type 209 diesel-electric attack submarine in service with the Argentine Navy. The vessel was reported as incapable of navigation as of 2020. However, Argentine navy divers were reported to be using her as a training platform at dockside.

Salta is one of two Type 209 acquired by the Armada Argentina; the other is ARA San Luis (S-32), which actively participated in the Falklands/Malvinas conflict in 1982 and was retired from service in 1997.

== History ==
ARA Salta (S-31), has participated during the 1978 crisis, together with other Argentine surface ships and submarines. The Argentine Navy was deployed to the South Atlantic for a possible intervention against Chile. This war was avoided because a peaceful solution was achieved.

During the Falklands War (1982), the S-31 was not available because of several mechanic problems; mainly the torpedo firing system; a successful trial was performed on 15 June, when the conflict was over.

Since then, the S-31 has participated in several national and international exercises, and also spent many years patrolling the Argentine sea. As of 2022 the submarine is still in service, as a training platform for tactic divers (Buzos Tacticos) of the Argentine Navy; also for other drill exercises and basic submarine training.

== See also ==
- Dolphin-class submarine
- Type 214 submarine
- Ula-class submarine
- Tridente-class submarine
