= SS-36 =

SS-36, SS 36 or SS36 may refer to:

In military

- BAP Arica (SS-36), a submarine of the Peruvian Navy commissioned in 1970 and currently in service
- USS K-5 (SS-36), a submarine of the United States Navy which saw service during World War I

In transportation

- SS36, a road in Italy

and also:

- USS S-36 (SS-141), a submarine of the United States Navy which saw service during the 1920s
