= Brazilian submarine Tupi =

Tupi-class submarines

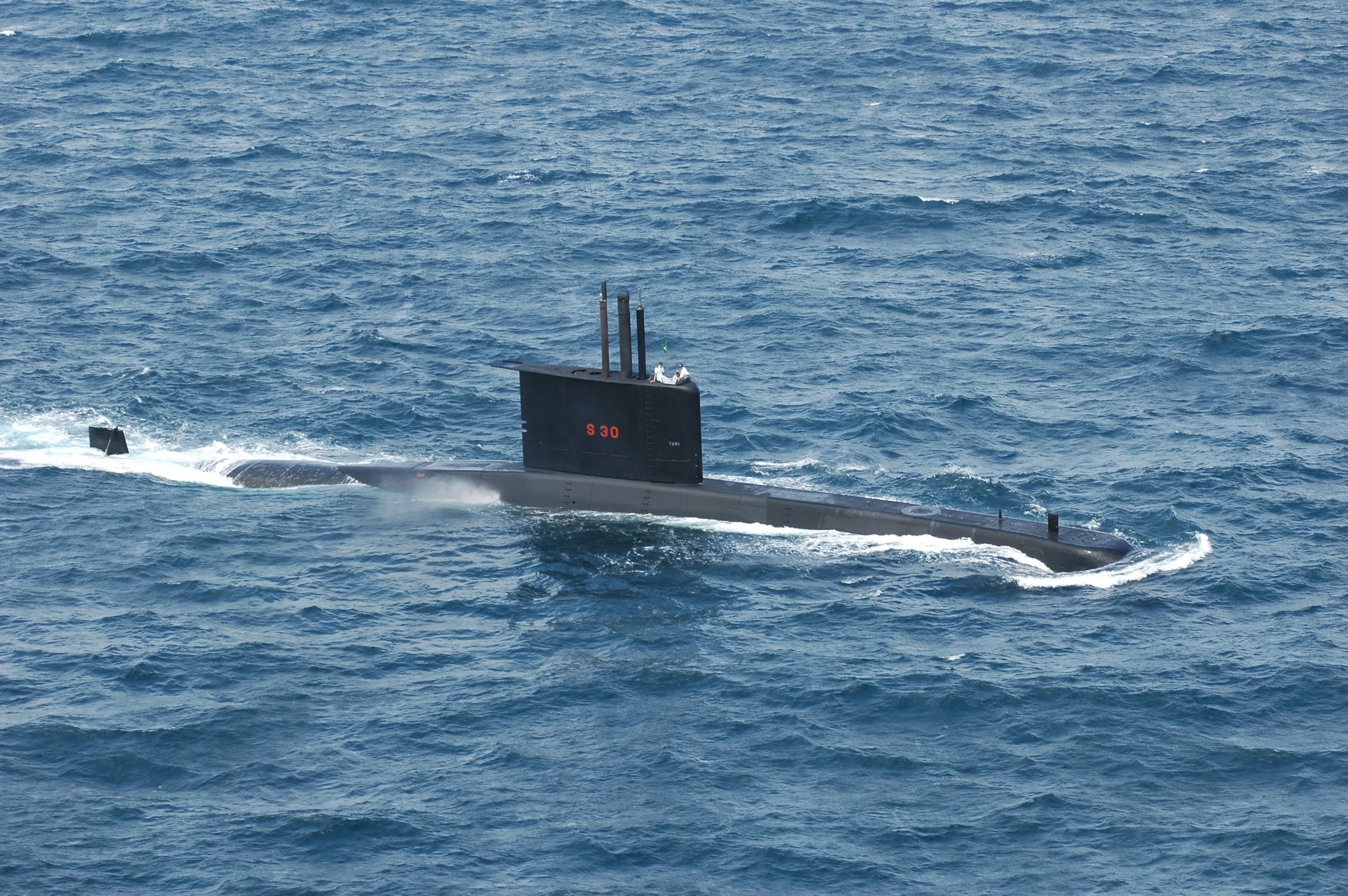
- S Tupi

History

Brazil
- Name: Tupi
- Namesake: Tupi
- Builder: Howaldtswerke-Deutsche Werft
- Laid down: 8 March 1985
- Launched: 28 April 1987
- Commissioned: 6 May 1989
- Identification: Pennant number: S-30
- Status: Active

General characteristics
- Class & type: Tupi-class submarine
- Displacement: 1,170 t (1,150 long tons) surfaced; 1,460 t (1,440 long tons) submerged
- Length: 61.2 m (200 ft 9 in)
- Beam: 6.25 m (20 ft 6 in)
- Draft: 5.5 m (18 ft 1 in)
- Propulsion: 4 ×diesel-electric engines; 1 × shaft, 4,500 kW (6,100 shp)
- Speed: 11 kn (20 kilometres per hour; 13 miles per hour) surfaced; 22 kn (41 km/h; 25 mph) submerged
- Range: 11,000 nmi (20,000 km; 13,000 mi) at 19 km/h (10 kn) surfaced; 8,000 nmi (15,000 km; 9,200 mi) at 19 km/h (10 kn) snorkeling; 400 nmi (740 km; 460 mi) at 7 km/h (4 kn) submerged
- Endurance: 50 days
- Test depth: 500 m (1,600 ft)
- Complement: 30
- Armament: 8 × 21 in (533 mm) torpedo tubes, 14 × torpedoes; optional UGM-84 Harpoon integration

Tupi (S30) is the lead boat of the Tupi-class submarine of the Brazilian Navy.

== Construction and career ==
The boat was built at Howaldtswerke-Deutsche Werft in Germany and was launched on 28 April 1987 and commissioned on 6 May 1989.

== Gallery ==
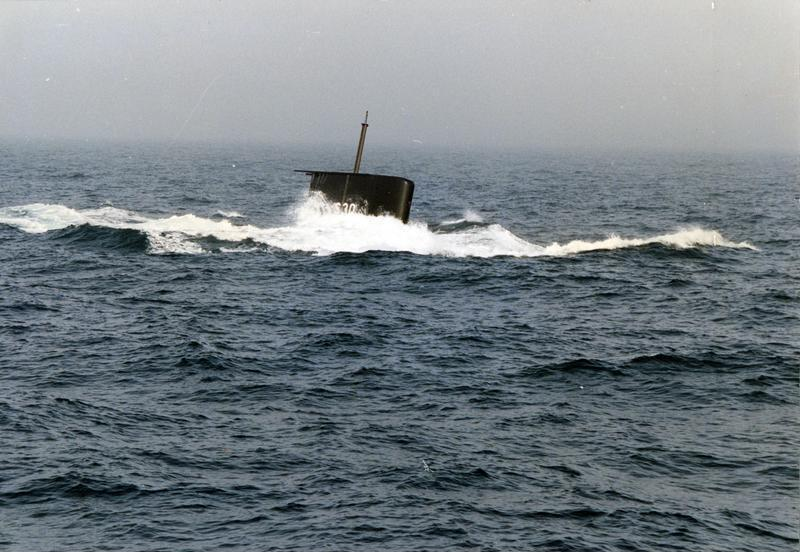
S Tupi during her sea trial in 1988

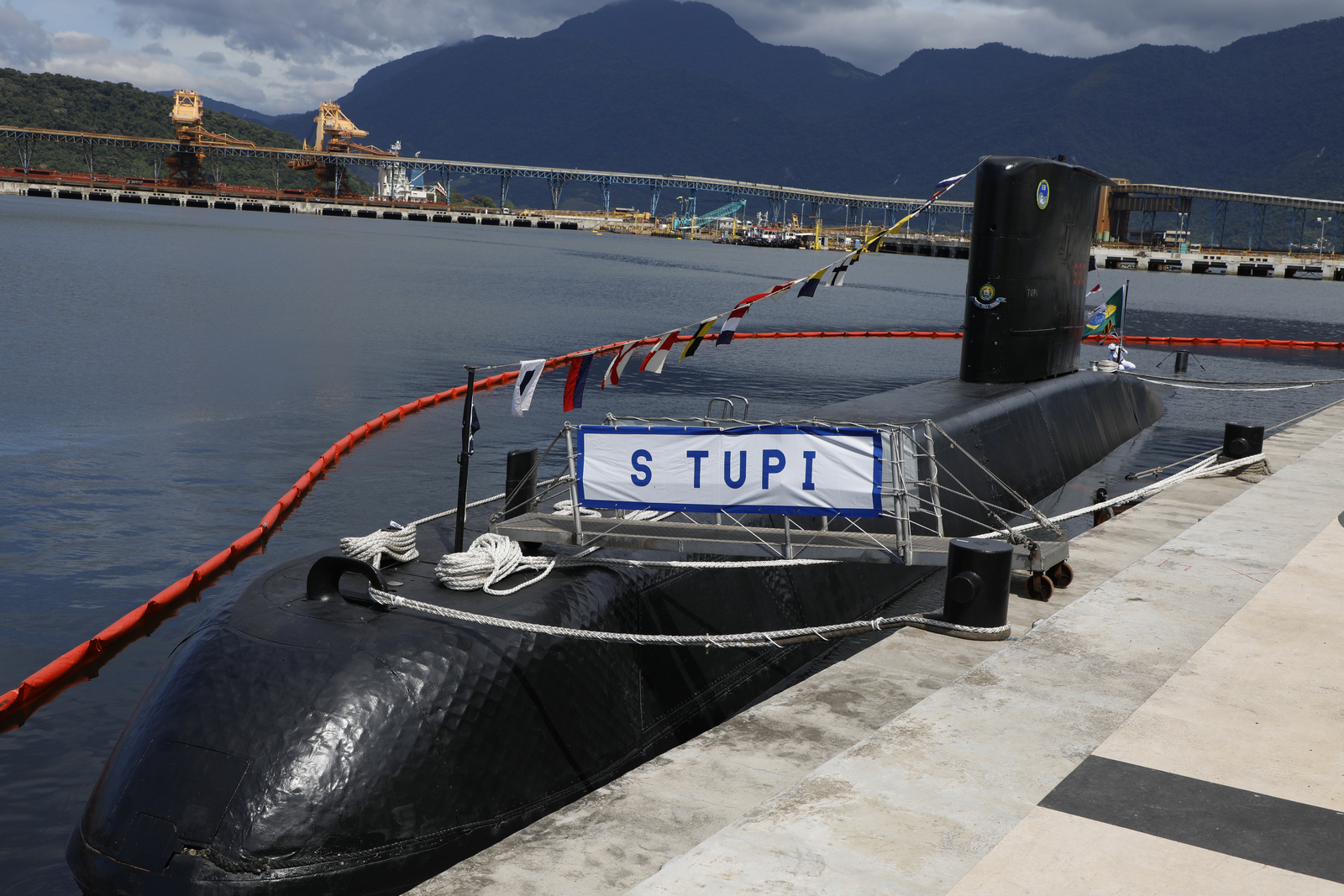
S Tupi on 11 December 2020
