= Chilean ship Almirante Simpson =

Several ships of the Chilean Navy have been named Almirante Simpson after Admiral Robert Winthrop Simpson (1799–1877), a Chilean of British origin who fought in the Chilean War of Independence and War of the Confederation. It may also refer to his son, Admiral Enrique Simpson (1835–1901), who fought in the War of the Pacific.

- Chilean barque Almirante Simpson, was a private ship built in 1847 and purchased by the navy during War of the Pacific. Original name was Elvira Alvarez and renamed in 1887.
- Chilean torpedo gunboat Almirante Simpson, launched in 1896 and transferred to Ecuador in 1907.
- Chilean destroyer Almirante Simpson, a Almirante Lynch-class destroyer (1912) launched in 1914. Retained by the United Kingdom as HMS Faulknor (1914) and transferred to Chile in 1920, being renamed Almirante Riveros. Retired in 1933.
- Chilean submarine Almirante Simpson, a Capitan O'Brien-class submarine (1928) launched in 1929. Retired in 1957.
- Chilean submarine Simpson (SS-21), ex USS Spot (SS-413) of the Balao-class submarine launched in 1944. Transferred to Chile in 1962 and retired in 1982.
- Chilean submarine Simpson (SS-21), a Type 209 submarine. In service from 1984 to the present.
