= BAP Arica =

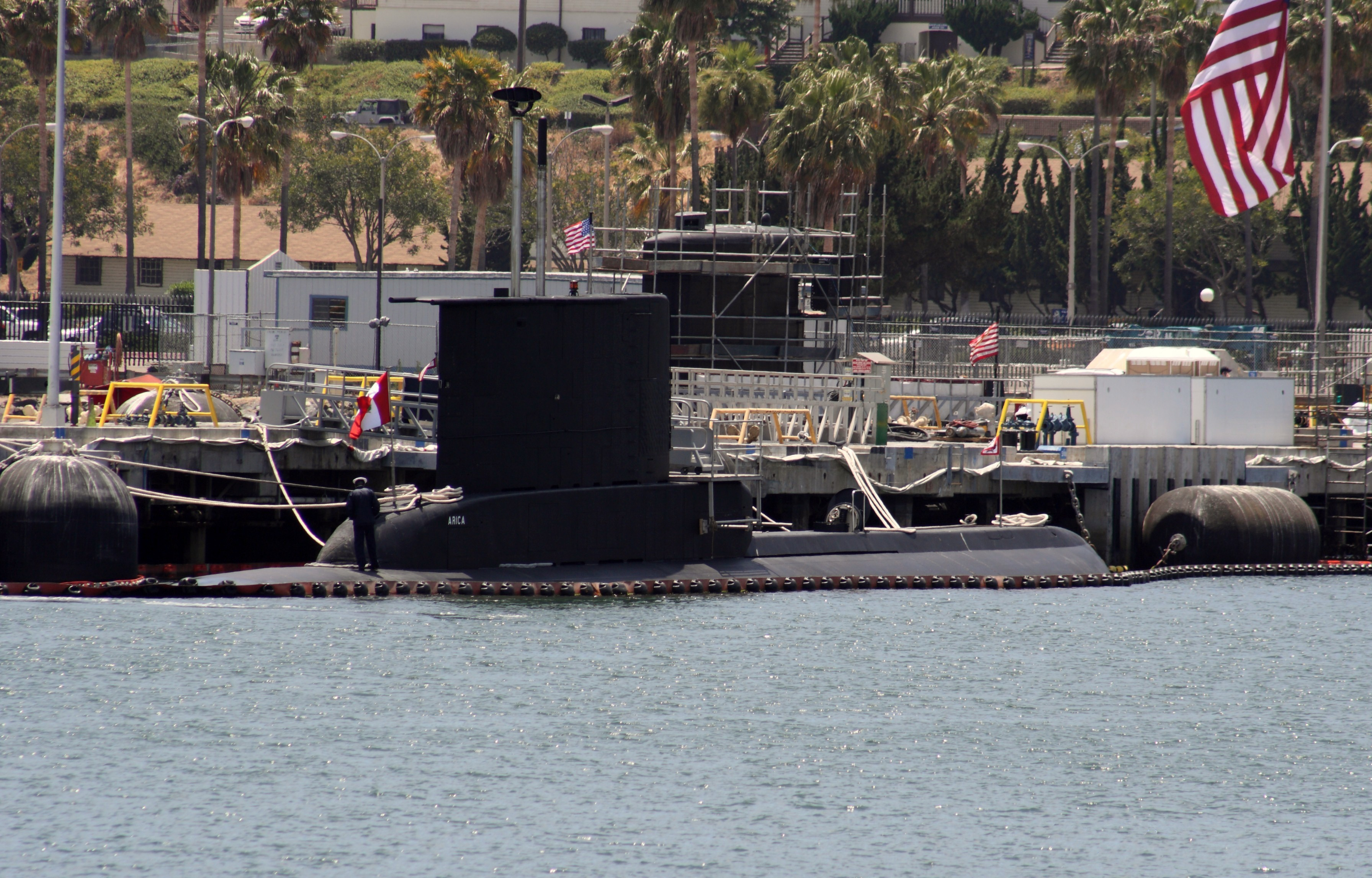
- BAP Arica (SS-36) tied up at Sub base Point Loma.

History

Peru
- Ordered: 24 June 1970
- Builder: Howaldtswerke Deutsche Werft AG
- Laid down: 1 October 1971
- Launched: 5 April 1974
- Commissioned: 21 January 1975
- Home port: Callao
- Motto: Al rumbo que exija la Patria

General characteristics
- Class & type: Type 209/1100
- Displacement: 1,180 t surfaced; 1,285 t submerged
- Length: 55.9 m
- Beam: 6.4 m
- Draft: 5.9 m
- Propulsion: 4 MTU Type 12V493 AZ80 GA31L diesel engines; 1 Siemens electric motor; 1 shaft; 4,600 hp (3,400 kW)
- Speed: 11 knots surfaced; 21 knots (39 km/h) submerged
- Range: 11,300 nm surfaced at 4 knots (7.4 km/h)
- Endurance: 40 days on patrol
- Complement: 7 officers, 29 enlisted
- Armament: 8 × 21 in (533 mm) torpedo tubes; 14 SST-4 torpedoes

BAP Arica (SS-36) is one of two Type 209/1100 submarines ordered by the Peruvian Navy on 24 June 1970. She was built by the German shipbuilder Howaldtswerke Deutsche Werft AG at its shipyard in Kiel. She is named after the naval battle of Arica, an engagement between naval forces of Peru and Chile on 7 June 1880. Following sea trials in the North Sea, she arrived to its homeport of Callao in 1975. After almost a decade in service she was overhauled in Kiel between 1983 and 1984 for further use.

== Sources ==
- Baker III, Arthur D., The Naval Institute Guide to Combat Fleets of the World 2002-2003. Naval Institute Press, 2002.
- Ortiz Sotelo, Jorge, Apuntes para la historia de los submarinos peruanos. Biblioteca Nacional, 2001.
- Scheina, Robert L. & Smigelski, Adam (1995). "Peru". In Chumbley, Stephen (ed.). Conway's All the World's Fighting Ships, 1947–1995 (revised ed.). Naval Institute Press. pp. 303–307. ISBN 1-55750-132-7.
