= ARA San Luis (S-32) =

1973 Salta-class submarine

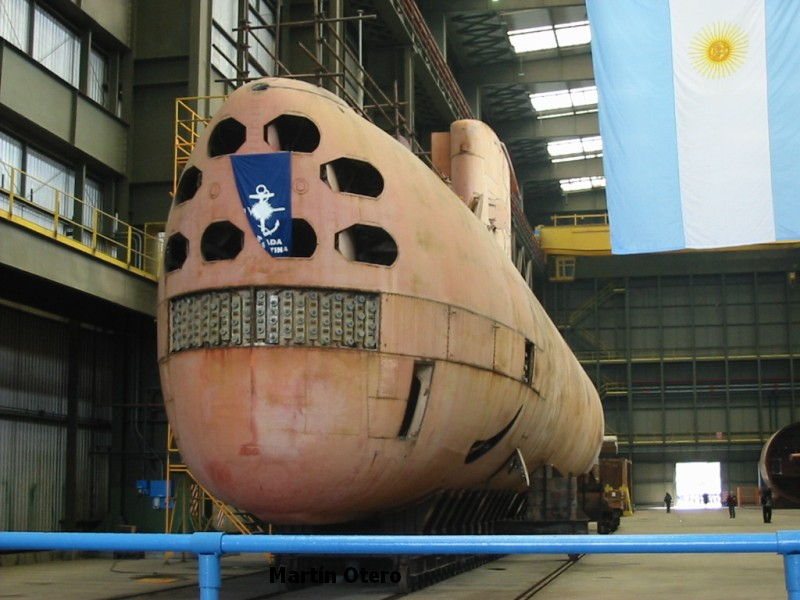
- Type 209 submarine ARA San Luis (S-32) at Domecq Garcia Shipyard, 2004

History

Argentina
- Name: San Luis
- Builder: Howaldtswerke-Deutsche Werft, Germany
- Completed: 3 April 1973
- Commissioned: 24 May 1974
- Out of service: 23 April 1997
- Identification: S32

General characteristics
- Class & type: Type 209 submarine
- Displacement: 1,000 tonnes (980 long tons; 1,100 short tons) (Surfaced); 1,285 tonnes (1,265 long tons; 1,416 short tons) (Submerged)
- Length: 55.91 m (183.4 ft)
- Beam: 6.2 m (20 ft)
- Draught: 5.5 m (18 ft)
- Propulsion: Diesel-electric, 4 diesels, 1 shaft
- Speed: 11 knots (20 km/h; 13 mph) surfaced; 21.5 knots (39.8 km/h; 24.7 mph) submerged
- Range: 11,000 nmi (20,000 km; 13,000 mi) at 10 knots (19 km/h; 12 mph); surfaced
- Endurance: 50 days
- Crew: 31
- Sensors & processing systems: Passive Sonar AN-525 A6; Active Sonar AN-407 A9
- Armament: 8 × 533 mm (21 in) torpedo tubes; 22 torpedoes

ARA San Luis (S-32) was a Type 209 diesel-powered submarine of the Argentine Navy. Built in Germany, San Luis has a displacement of 1,285 tonnes (1,265 long tons; 1,416 short tons) and was commissioned in 1974. The submarine operated against the Royal Navy during the Falklands War without any noticeable success, but survived a number of anti-submarine sweeps carried out by British frigates. San Luis was struck in 1997 after an incomplete overhaul; as of 2020, its hull remained stored at Domecq Garcia Shipyard (Tandanor).

== Design ==
The Type 209 submarine was designed by Ingenieurkontor Lübeck (IKL) headed by Ulrich Gabler and is largely based on previous German submarine designs (in particular the Type 206) with increased equipment. The design is single hulled and allows the commanding officer to see the entire submarine from the bow to stern while standing at the periscope. Four 120-cell batteries are located forward and aft of the command center in the lower deck and make up about 25% of the boat's displacement. Two main ballast tanks with forward and aft trim tanks allow the boat to dive. They are powered by four MTU diesels and four AEG generators.

== History ==
=== Falklands War ===
San Luis served in the Falklands War (Spanish: Guerra de las Malvinas/Guerra del Atlántico Sur) of 1982. Only one other submarine, the Second World War-era ARA Santa Fe, was operational at this time. After Santa Fe was damaged, captured and scuttled by the British during the re-taking of South Georgia on 28 April, and the nuclear submarine HMS Conqueror had sunk the cruiser ARA General Belgrano on 2 May, the Argentine fleet retired to port for the duration of the war, with the exception of San Luis, making her the only Argentine naval presence facing the British fleet.

San Luis was a major concern for the British as she presented a serious danger to all British warships in the area. Sea, depth and thermal conditions around the Falklands were favourable to diesel submarines, and difficult for anti-submarine ships. The Royal Navy (RN) aircraft carriers Hermes and Invincible were the priority targets for San Luis. Sources conflict on whether San Luis was capable of finding and attacking the RN carriers. Considerations include that the RN aircraft carriers were confined to operate east of the Falklands within sectors determined by the range of Sea Harrier, the ability of the Argentines to intercept RN ships' satellite communications, and to a degree by Soviet intelligence assistance.

San Luis reported two attacks on Royal Navy ships during the war. On 1 May, the frigates Brilliant and Yarmouth were sent to hunt down San Luis, then operating north of Stanley. San Luis reported firing a German-made SST-4 torpedo, on purely passive sonar detection of British gas turbine-powered warship(s) and Sea King helicopters searching. The torpedo missed its target, presumably due to range, malfunctioning of the computer fire control system, gyro misalignment and the breakage of the wire guidance wire. Nevertheless, experts believe that a closer range attack or alternative use of the MK 37 in an anti-ship role might have been successful. Sonar operators aboard Brilliant were certain they heard and confirmed the sound of an SST-4, and Brilliant, Yarmouth and three Sea Kings from Hermes's 826 Naval Air Squadron launched depth charge, mortar and torpedo attacks for 20 hours until the short sub-Antarctic night on 1 May. Searching for the Type 209 submarine was hindered by the numerous wrecks of whaling boats and whales, indistinguishable from submarines. San Luis had adopted the World War II tactics of German U-boats and rested on the bottom some distance from the area of interest to the British frigates, where it shut down. During the short Falklands War, the United States supplied 200 Mk 46 torpedoes to the Royal Navy, which expended 50 Mk 46 torpedoes during the conflict against sonar detection of the possible sound of the single Type 209 submarine. The Royal Navy never detected or located the submarine, which was in among the fleet, but whose weapon system effectiveness had been limited by British Intelligence.

San Luis attacked again on the night of 10 May. The frigate Alacrity had made passage up Falkland Sound, sinking an Argentine merchant navy ship on the way. As Alacrity left the channel before dawn, sister ship Arrow was waiting to accompany her back to the Task Force. San Luis detected the two ships and fired two SST-4 torpedoes, one of which did not leave its tube; the other was apparently defeated by Arrow's anti-torpedo measures. It seems that the torpedo hit Arrow's towed decoy. In the subsequent counter-attack, San Luis survived a 25-hour chase, which included the use of depth-charges. There were several problems with torpedoes and torpedo systems; in particular it appears that the torpedoes were not prepared properly, and did not arm themselves after firing, so would not explode even if they did hit a target. It has been suggested that previous apparent misses could have been due to torpedoes which struck home but did not explode. After the Falklands War ended, German and Dutch engineers were sent to Argentina to discover what went wrong with their torpedoes. The problem was found to be that one of the Argentine Navy technicians who were in charge of periodic maintenance of the torpedoes had inadvertently reversed the polarity of power cables between the torpedoes and the submarine. This meant that when the torpedoes' gyros were spun up, they ran "backwards" and thus tumbled on launch, preventing the weapons from taking up their proper heading.

The mere presence of San Luis was a severe nuisance to the Task Force. The threat posed by the Argentine submarine forced the Royal Navy to suspend the rescue efforts of two Sea King helicopters who ditched at sea on 12 May and 18 May 1982 respectively, while conducting anti-submarine operations. Both aircraft were eventually scuttled by naval gunfire.

San Luis returned to Puerto Belgrano on 17 May for repairs to her weapons systems, and was not operational for the rest of the war.

=== Post-war ===
After a failed overhaul, San Luis was decommissioned in 1997. Its hull remains stored at Tandanor shipyard, in Buenos Aires.

== See also ==
- List of submarines of Submarine Force Command
