= Chilean submarine Thomson (SS-20) =

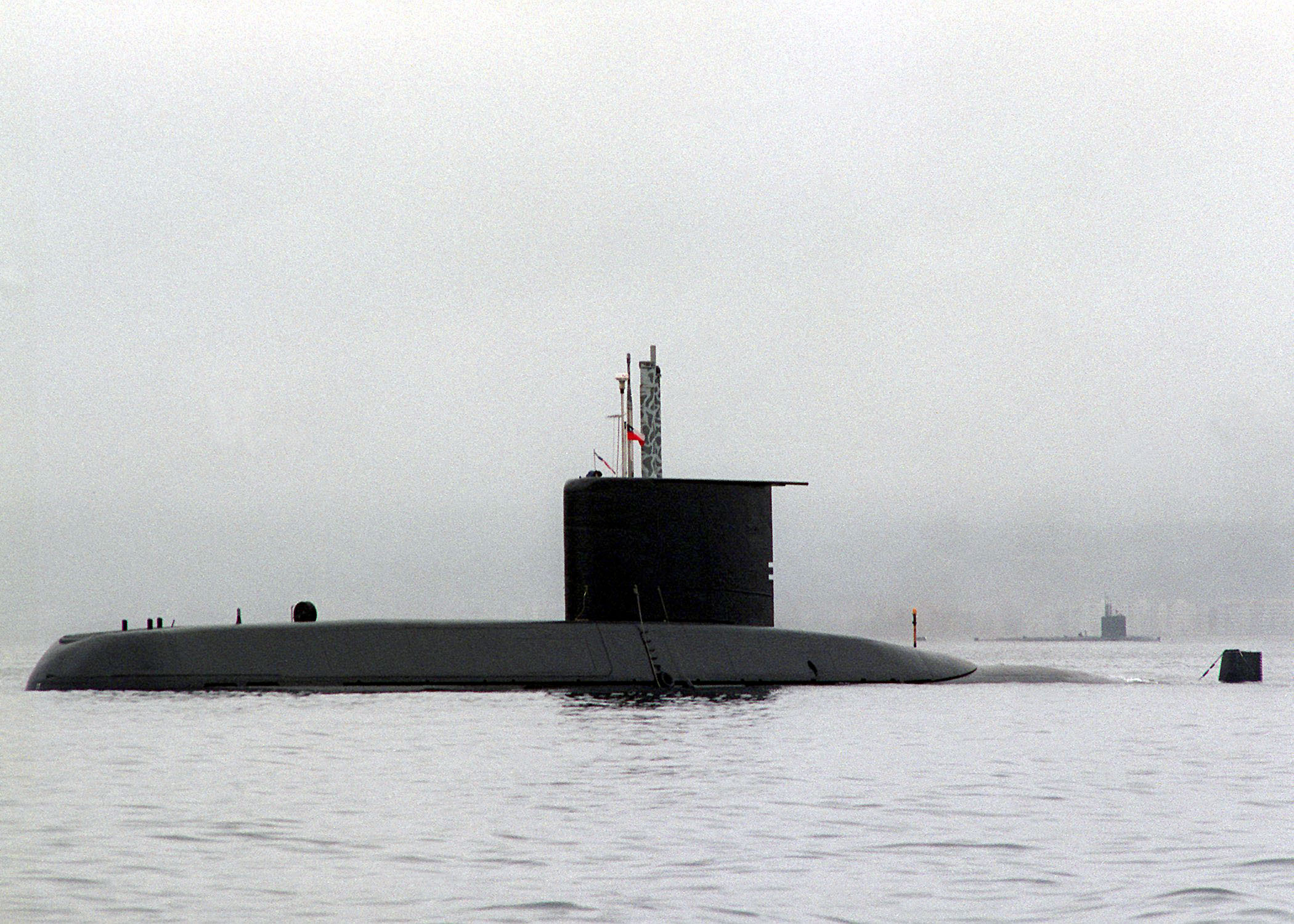
- Thomson at Coquimbo, 1996

History

Chile
- Name: Thomson
- Namesake: Manuel Thomson
- Builder: Howaldtswerke-Deutsche Werft, Kiel
- Launched: 28 October 1982
- Commissioned: 31 August 1984
- Home port: Talcahuano
- Status: Active

General characteristics
- Class & type: Thomson class (Type 209/1400-L)
- Displacement: 1,260 long tons (1,280 t) surfaced; 1,586 long tons (1,611 t) submerged
- Length: 61.2 m (200 ft 9 in)
- Beam: 6.25 m (20 ft 6 in)
- Draft: 5.5 m (18 ft 1 in)
- Depth: 300m
- Installed power: 2400 HP 4600 HP (submerged)
- Propulsion: Diesel-electric • 4 diesel engines • 1 axle
- Speed: 11 knots (20 km/h; 13 mph) surfaced; 22 kn (41 km/h; 25 mph) submerged
- Range: 10,000 km (6,200 mi) at 8 kn (15 km/h; 9.2 mph) (surface); 8,000 km (5,000 mi) at 8 kn (15 km/h; 9.2 mph) (snorkeling); 400 km (250 mi) at 4 kn (7.4 km/h; 4.6 mph) (submerged); 50 days
- Complement: 33
- Armament: 8 × 533 mm (21 in) torpedo tubes for 16 Whitehead Alenia Sistemi Subacquei Black Shark heavyweight torpedoes

Thomson (SS-20) is a Type 209 submarine, 1400-l variant and referred to as the Thomson class. The boat was built for the Chilean Navy by Howaldtswerke-Deutsche Werft shipyards in Kiel, Germany. The boats namesake is Manuel Thomson Porto Mariño, who died as commander of the Huáscar, during the blockade of Arica in the War of the Pacific.

Thomson is homeported in Talcahuano. A systems modernisation was carried out between 2007 and 2009.

She has one sister ship in Chilean service Simpson.
