= Chilean submarine Simpson (1982) =

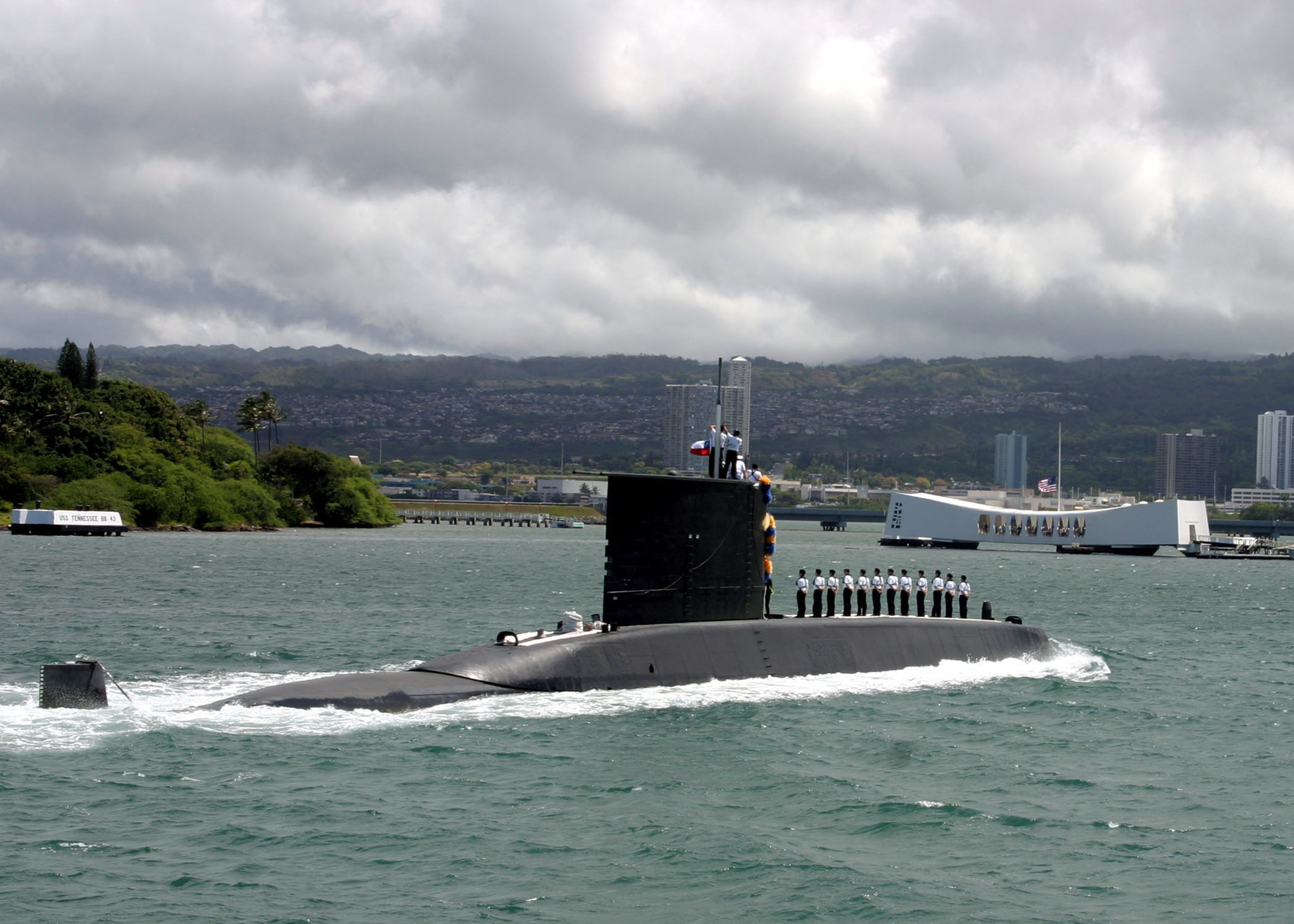
- Simpson preparing to honor USS Arizona at Pearl Harbor, Hawaii in 2004

History

Chile
- Name: Simpson
- Namesake: Robert Winthrop Simpson
- Builder: Howaldtswerke-Deutsche Werft, Kiel
- Launched: 1982
- Commissioned: 31 August 1984
- Home port: Talcahuano
- Status: Active

General characteristics
- Class & type: Thomson class (Type 209/1400-L) submarine
- Displacement: 1,260 long tons (1,280 t) surfaced; 1,586 long tons (1,611 t) submerged
- Length: 61.2 m (200 ft 9 in)
- Beam: 6.25 m (20 ft 6 in)
- Draft: 5.5 m (18 ft 1 in)
- Depth: 300 m (980 ft)
- Installed power: 2,400 hp (1,800 kW) 4,600 hp (3,400 kW) (submerged)
- Propulsion: Diesel-electric • 4 diesel engines • 1 axle
- Speed: 11 knots (20 km/h; 13 mph) surfaced; 22 kn (41 km/h; 25 mph) submerged
- Range: 10,000 km (6,200 mi) at 8 kn (15 km/h; 9.2 mph) (surface); 8,000 km (5,000 mi) at 8 kn (15 km/h; 9.2 mph) (snorkeling); 400 km (250 mi) at 4 kn (7.4 km/h; 4.6 mph) (submerged); 50 days
- Complement: 33
- Armament: 8 × 533 mm (21 in) torpedo tubes for 16 Whitehead Alenia Sistemi Subacquei Black Shark heavyweight torpedoes

Simpson (SS-21) is a Type 209 submarine, 1400-l variant and referred to as the Thomson class. The boat was built for the Chilean Navy by Howaldtswerke-Deutsche Werft shipyards in Kiel, Germany.

Simpson is the first of two units, ahead of Thomson. It is currently serving in the Submarine Force with a base port in Talcahuano. Between 2009 and 2012, it underwent a systems modernisation.

== Gallery ==
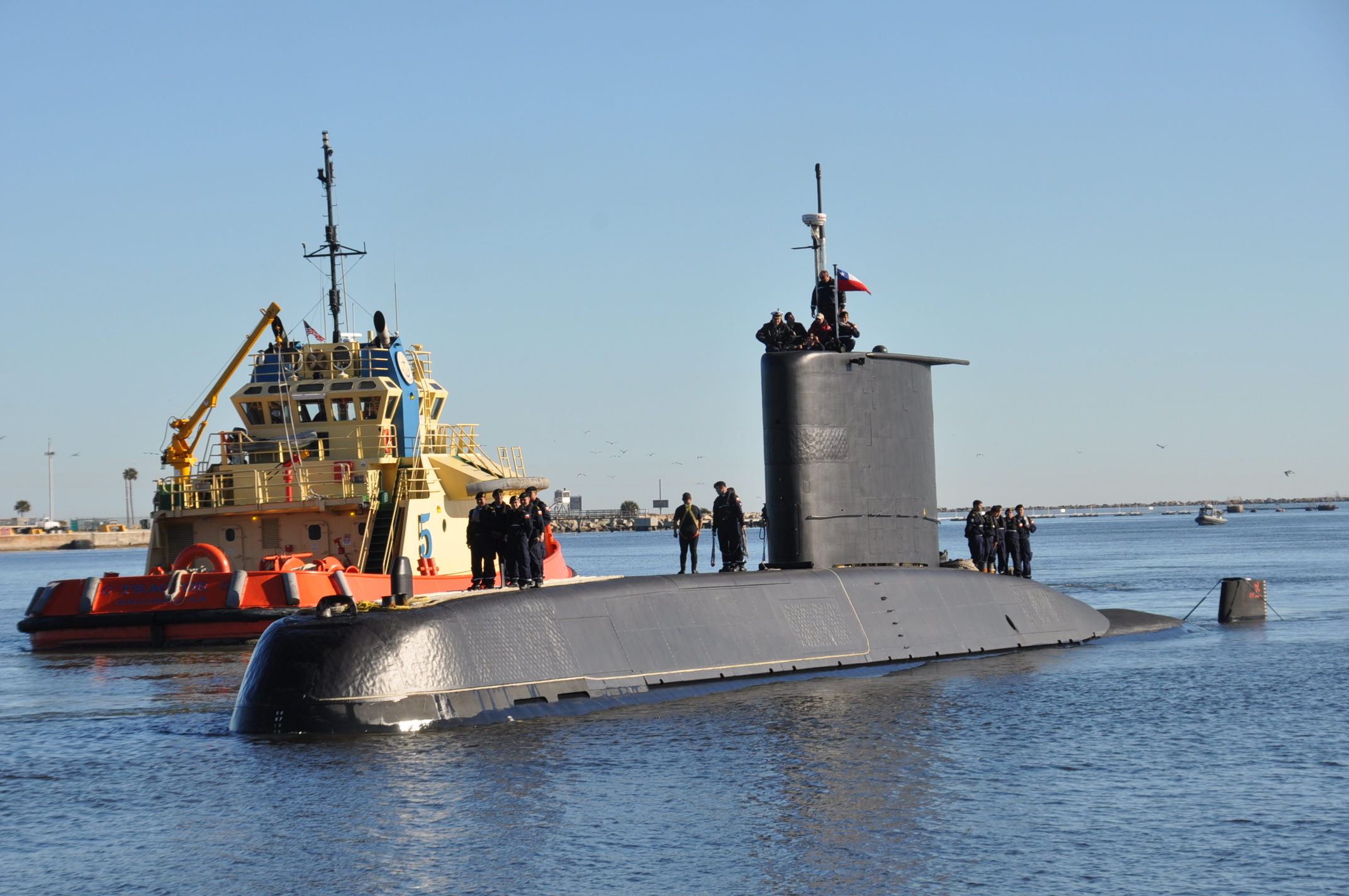
Simpson arriving at Naval Station Mayport

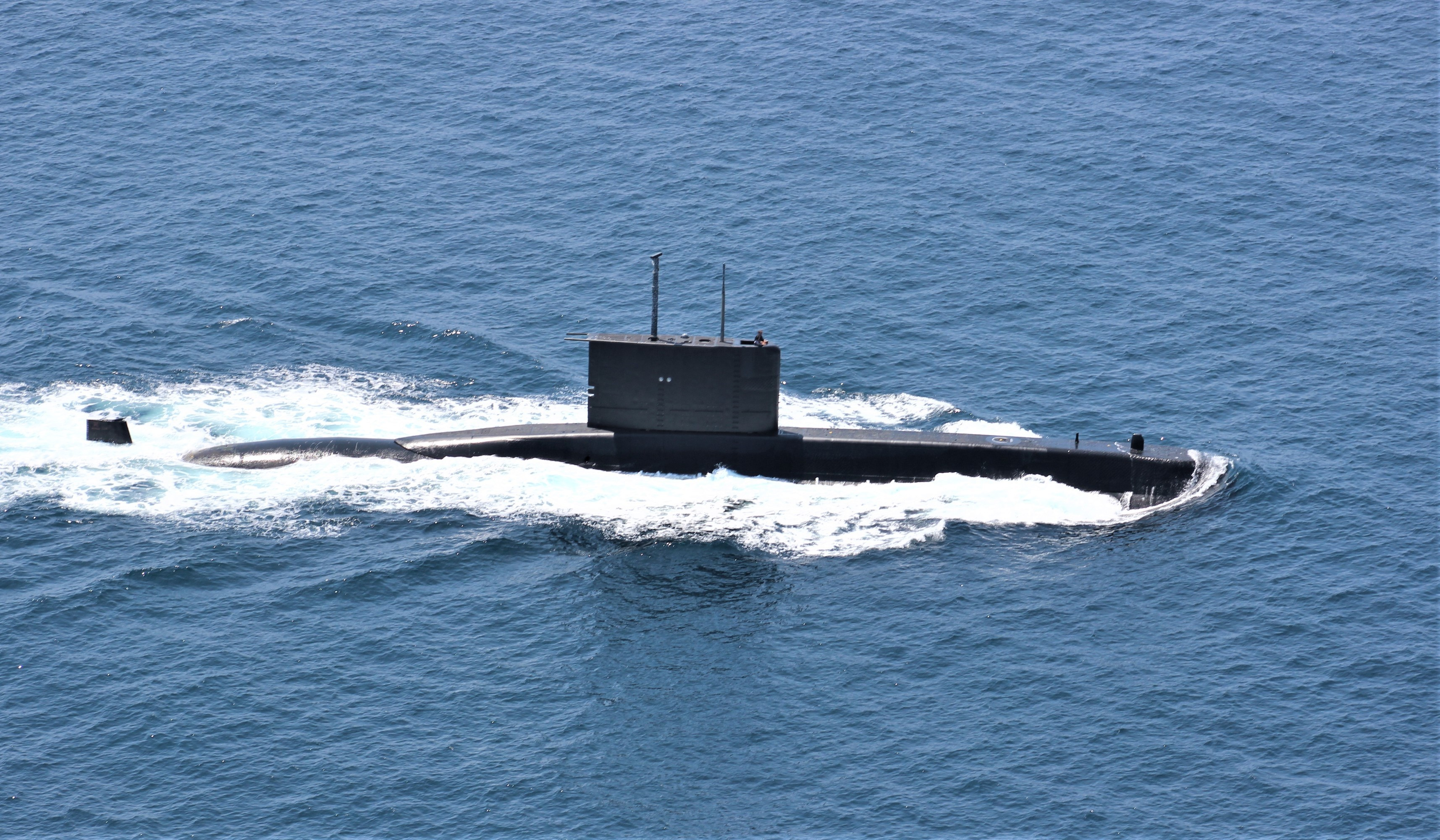
Simpson underway in the Pacific Ocean on 3 August 2018

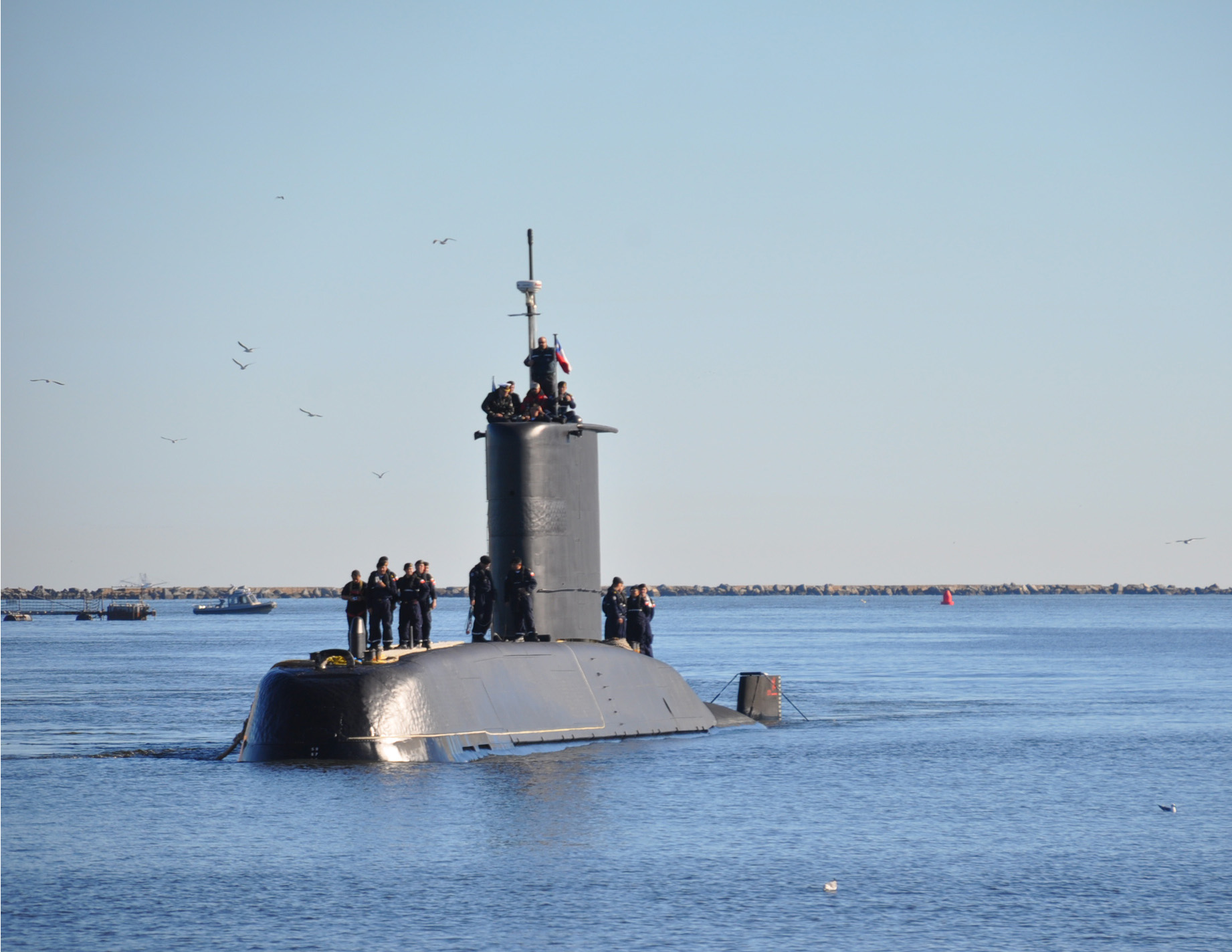
Simpson arriving at Naval Station Mayport; Nov. 26, 2012.
