= Ulrich Gabler =

German shipbuilding engineer

- Born: 1 October 1913; Berlin
- Died: 24 February 1994 (aged 80); Lübeck
- Education: Charlottenburg Technical University
- Occupation: mechanical engineer (shipbuilding)

Ulrich Gabler (1 October 1913 – 24 February 1994) was a German shipbuilding engineer, who specialized in the design and development of diesel-powered submarines.

== History ==
During World War II he served as chief engineer in the U-boat force on U-121 and U-564, then under the command of Reinhard Suhren. Suhren had recommended Gabler for the Knight's Cross of the Iron Cross, a request that was turned down and Gabler received the German Cross in Gold on 15 October 1942. Following his war patrols on U-564 he worked on the design and development of the U-boat classes XXII, XVII A and XXVI.

After the war he founded the Ingenieurkontor Lübeck (IKL) which among others designed the type 201, 202, 205 and 209 submarines.

In 1963 he was appointed honorary professor at the University of Hamburg for shipbuilding.

== Awards ==
- Iron Cross (1939) 2nd and 1st Class
- U-boat War Badge (1939)
- German Cross in Gold on 15 October 1942 as Oberleutnant (Ing.) of the Reserves on U-564/1. Unterseebootsflottille
- War Merit Cross 2nd and 1st Class
