= SST torpedo =

Series of German torpedoes

- Type: Heavyweight dual-purpose ASW and ASuW torpedo
- Place of origin: Germany

Service history
- In service: 1972-Present

Production history
- Manufacturer: Atlas Elektronik
- Variants: SST-3, SST-4

Specifications
- Mass: 1,414 kilograms (3,117 lb)
- Diameter: 533 mm
- Maximum firing range: 37 kilometres (20 nmi)
- Warhead weight: 260 kilograms (570 lb)
- Detonation mechanism: Contact or proximity detonation
- Engine: Electrical batteries
- Maximum speed: 37 knots (69 km/h)
- Guidance system: wire-guided with active/passive acoustic homing sonar

The SST family is a series of German dual-purpose 21 inch wire-guided torpedoes produced for export by Atlas Elektronik. SST stands for Special Surface Target.

== Variants ==
=== SST-3 Seal - Seehund ===
The SST-3 is a anti-ship homing torpedo that can be fired from both surface ships and submarines. It entered into service in 1972.

=== SST-4 Seal - Seehund ===
The SST-4 is an improved version of the SST-3 and therefore is nearly identical to the SST-3 with the addition of passive homing. It also differs from the SST-3 by having three speeds. It entered service in 1980. A further improvement is the SST-4 Mod 1, which has additional return signals and a magnetic proximity fuze.

Guidance: The Torpedo was wire guided, but the guidance system only allowed for limited interaction between submarine and torpedo. It featured active and passive homing and could be launched from up to 100 meters deep. Seeker was designed only for surface ships, being superior to original SUT torpedoes at that role, but lacking the ASW capabilities.

Range and Speed: Originally featured 2 speed presets, a slower 23 knots speed with a range of 37 kilometers, and a fast 37 knots speed with a range of around 11 kilometers.

Detonator and Warhead: Mod 0 featured an impact fuze, but mod1 also added magnetic fuze, since test showed that seekers winding path could make the torpedo hit target at a sharp angle preventing the contact detonation. Warhead was 260 kg of explosive.

== Service history ==
The SST-4 was employed by the Argentine Navy during the Falklands War with poor results. The only Argentine operational Type 209 submarine, ARA San Luis (S-32), fired three torpedoes with no hits after all of them failed to work properly. Investigations conducted by Argentine Navy after the conflict came to the results that there was a problem in the seekers who were assembled wrong, and with the support of the manufacturer fixed the entire navy SST-4 supply in the next years, further upgrading them by the addition of magnetic fuze, performing a successful live test in which the newly commissioned ARA Santa Cruz (S-41) sank the decommissioned destroyer ARA Py (D-27) on June 17, 1987.

In 2018 the Turkish navy destroyed a target ship with a SST-4 Mod 0 fired from the TCG Yildiray.

In 2020 the Hellenic Navy destroyed a target ship with a SST-4, fired from the Υ/Β ΠΙΠΙΝΟΣ 214 HN (S121).

== Users ==
- Argentine Navy
- Hellenic Navy
- Turkish Navy

== See also ==
- SUT torpedo
