= Type 209 submarine =

Submarine class

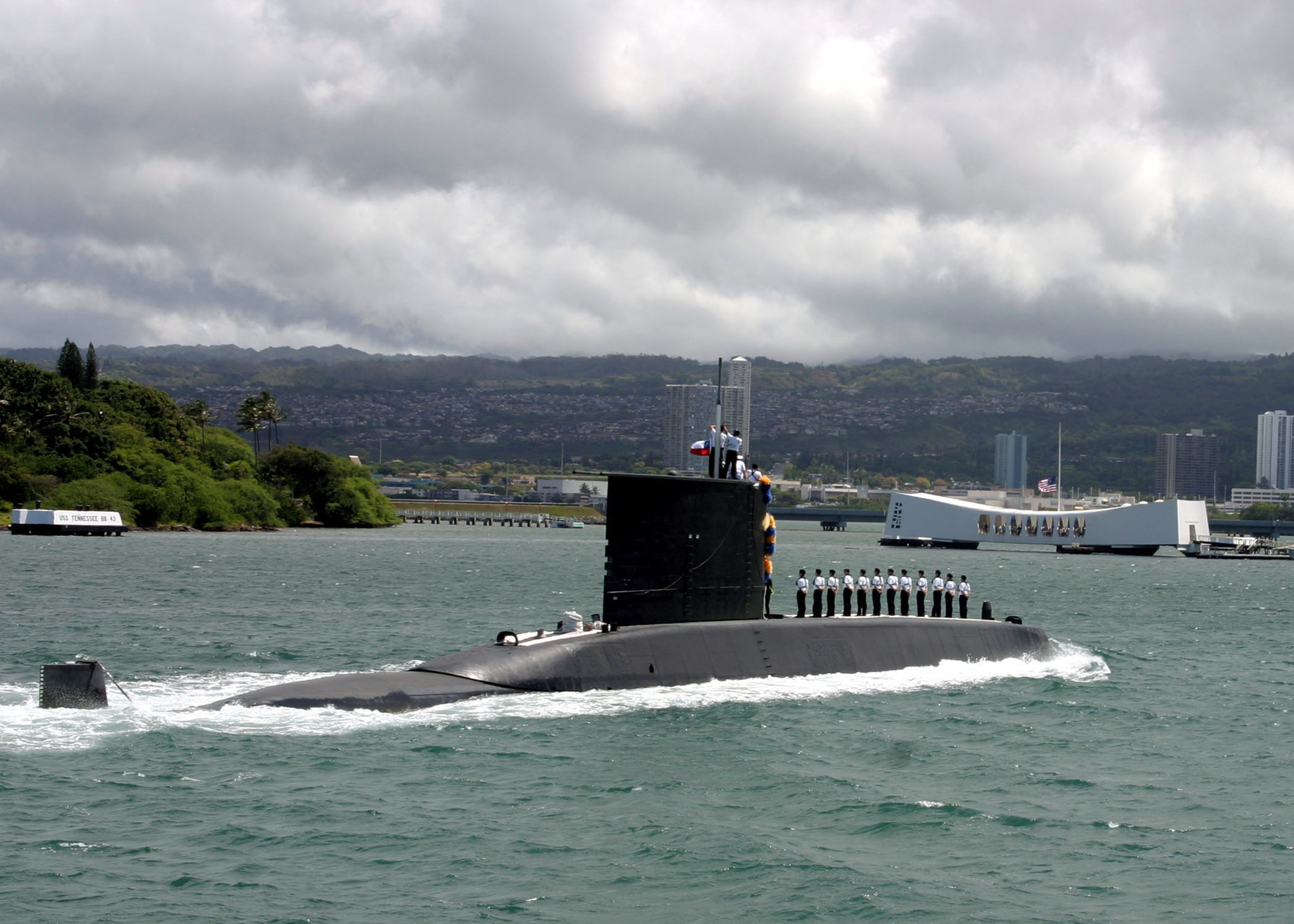
- Chilean Navy's Type 209/1400 Simpson (SS-21) pulling into port at Pearl Harbor, Hawaii in 2004.

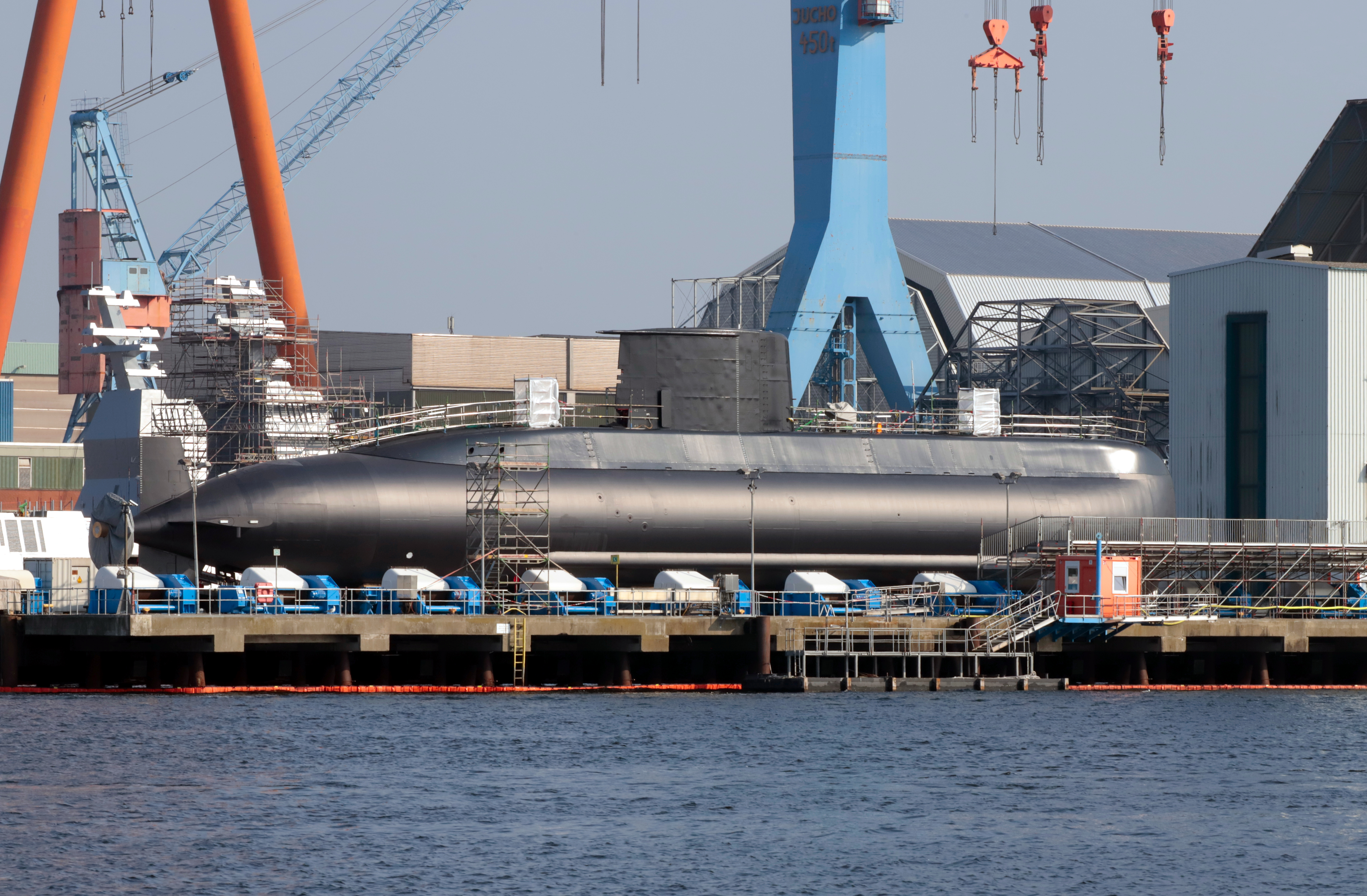
- Egyptian Navy submarine of German submarine class 209-1400 mod at Kiel

Class overview
- Builders: Howaldtswerke-Deutsche Werft; Nordseewerke; Mazagon Dock Shipbuilders
- Operators: See § Operators
- Preceded by: Type 206
- Succeeded by: Type 214
- Subclasses: Jang Bogo class; Shishumar class; Heroine class; Dolphin I class
- Built: 1968–present
- In commission: 1971–present
- Planned: 77
- On order: 3
- Completed: 68
- Canceled: 9 (1 Brazil, 2 India, 6 Iran)
- Active: 58 (2 possibly laid up)
- Laid up: 1 (+2 probable)
- Lost: 1
- Retired: 8
- Preserved: 1 (planned)

General characteristics
- Type: See § Technical specifications
- Length: 209/1500: 64.4 m (211 ft 3 in); 209/1200: 55.9 m (183 ft 5 in)
- Draft: 209/1500: 6.2 m (20 ft 4 in); 209/1200: 5.5 m (18 ft 1 in)
- Propulsion: Diesel-electric, 4 diesels, 1 shaft.; 209/1500: 4,500 kW (6,100 shp); 209/1100–1400: 3,700 kW (5,000 shp)
- Speed: 11.5 kn (21.3 kilometres per hour; 13.2 miles per hour) surfaced; 22.5 kn (41.7 km/h; 25.9 mph) submerged
- Range: 11,000 nmi (20,000 km; 13,000 mi) at 19 km/h (10 kn) surfaced; 8,000 nmi (15,000 km; 9,200 mi) at 19 km/h (10 kn) snorkeling; 400 nmi (740 km; 460 mi) at 7 km/h (4 kn) submerged
- Endurance: Variant-dependent
- Test depth: 500 m (1,600 ft)
- Complement: 36
- Armament: 8 × 21 in (533 mm) torpedo tubes, 14 torpedoes; optional UGM-84 Harpoon integration

The Type 209 (German: U-Boot-Klasse 209) is a range of diesel-electric attack submarines developed exclusively for export by Howaldtswerke-Deutsche Werft of Germany. Five class variants (Types 209/1100, 209/1200, 209/1300, 209/1400 and 209/1500), including modifications thereof, have been successfully exported to 15 countries, with 68 submarines being built and commissioned to five variants between 1971 and 2021. More boats have been built to modified designs.

The original variant, the Type 209/1100, was designed in the late 1960s with Greece becoming its first adopter. Turkey is the largest adopter, having purchased 14 submarines consisting of eight Type 209/1400 and six Type 209/1200 submarines. A non-specific variant was adopted by Israel as its first Dolphin class. The Type 209 family is the most widely proliferated submarine in Latin America, having been adopted by seven countries.

== Development ==
In the early 1970s, many navies began to need replacements for World War II-era submarines, aging United States GUPPY conversions, and British units transferred postwar. During this time, few western submarine designs were available for export as most were large, expensive, sophisticated and difficult to operate, and designed for the Cold War. Several designs originally built for specific nations were available including the French Daphné, British Oberon, and the Soviet Foxtrot-class submarines. The design, designated by the German Ministry of Defense as the "Type 209" provided a solution providing the combination of size, performance, relative ease of operation for small or inexperienced navies, reasonable price and economy of operation.

== Design ==
The submarine was designed by Ingenieurkontor Lübeck (IKL) headed by Ulrich Gabler and is largely based on previous German submarine designs (in particular the Type 206) with increased equipment. The design is single hulled and allows the commanding officer to see the entire submarine from the bow to stern while standing at the periscope.

=== Armaments ===
Type 209 submarines are armed with eight bow 533 mm (21 in) torpedo tubes and 14 torpedoes. The Type 209/1200s used by Greece and South Korea, and the Type 209/1400s used by Turkey are also armed with Sub-Harpoon missiles. Boats used by South Korea can be armed with 28 mines in place of torpedoes and Harpoon missiles; while the Indian boats can carry 24 mines externally.

The class can be armed with a variety of torpedo models depending upon the country. The majority of boats carry SUT - Surface and Underwater Target (Greece, India, Indonesia, South Africa, South Korea) or the SST - Special Surface Target (Argentina, Peru, Turkey's 209/1200s, Venezuela) torpedoes. The boats can also carry the Mark 24 Tigerfish (Brazil, Turkey's Preveze class 209/1400), DM2A3 (Colombia), Blackshark (Chile), A184 mod. 3 (Ecuador), DM2A4 (Turkey's Gür class 209/1400) and Mark 37 (Argentina).

Brazil's boats will receive new integrated combat systems from Lockheed Martin to enable use of the Mark 48 torpedo. Successful tests of the new combat system occurred on Tapajó in December 2011.

=== Propulsion ===
Four 120-cell batteries are located forward and aft of the command center in the lower deck and make up about 25% of the boat's displacement. Two main ballast tanks with forward and aft trim tanks allow the boat to dive. They are powered by four MTU diesels and four AEG generators. The AEG electric motor is attached directly to a five- or seven-bladed propeller.

== Service ==
Countries operating the Type 209 include Argentina, Brazil, Chile, Colombia, Ecuador, Egypt, Greece, India, Indonesia, Israel, Peru, South Africa, South Korea, Turkey and Venezuela. Iran had an order for six Type 209 submarines that was cancelled by Grand Ayatolla Khomeini in 1979, following the Iranian Revolution. The first user was Greece's Hellenic Navy which commissioned four Type 209/1100s (Glafkos class) between 1971 and 1972 and four Type 209/1200s (Poseidon class) in 1979. Greece is replacing its aging Glavkos class with four Type 214 submarines (Papanikolis class), and Turkey will be replacing early Atılay-class ships with six Type 214 submarines.

As of early 2024, most of the Type 209 built are still in commission. Argentina's ARA San Luis was stricken in 1997 after an incomplete overhaul; Greece's Glavkos was decommissioned in 2011; Turkey's TCG Saldıray was decommissioned in 2014 and TCG Atılay decommissioned in 2016; Indonesia's KRI Nanggala sank in 2021.

The second user was Argentina which commissioned two Type 209/1200 submarines (Salta class) in 1974. The Argentine Navy supplemented them with two TR-1700-class submarines (Santa Cruz class) commissioned between 1984 and 1985. During the Falklands War (1982), the ARA San Luis performed a war patrol. While on their way to the area assigned the fire control computer went out of order. The vessel continued on to the combat area, and managed to fire at least 3 wire guided SST-4 mod0 torpedoes at the British fleet. The torpedoes suffered from various issues, with the guide wire cut a minute after launch and the torpedoes going off the assigned course. After the war testing revealed that the torpedoes' electric gyroscopes had reversed polarity, which resulted in a complete refit of the entire Argentinean torpedo stock, and a conversion of a portion of this stock from Mod0 to Mod1, performed by the firm which produced these weapons (AEG). Beside the torpedo issue, San Luis patrolled mostly undetected.

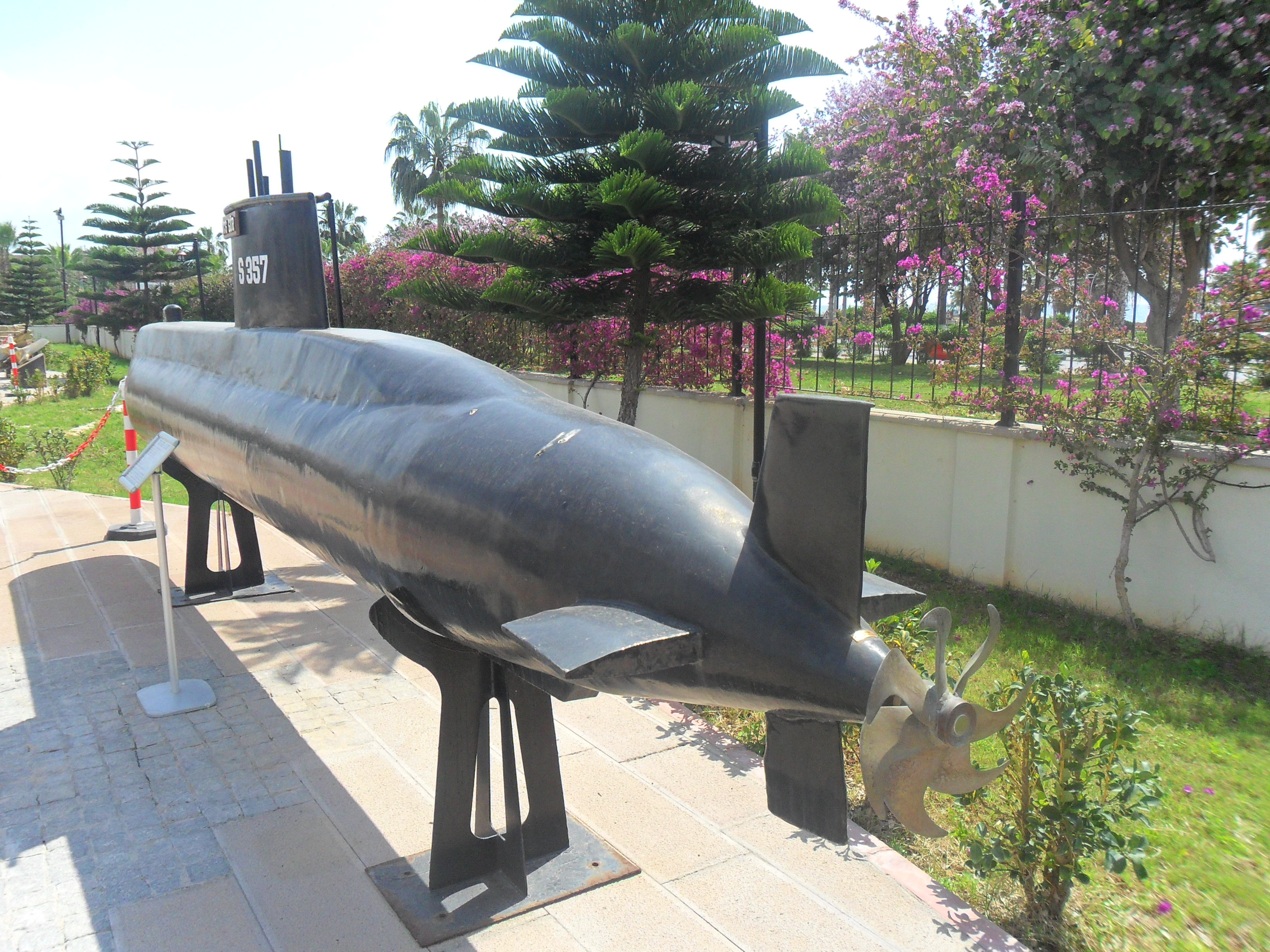
Rear view of a replica of the Turkish Naval Forces' Type 209/1400 TCG Gür (S-357)

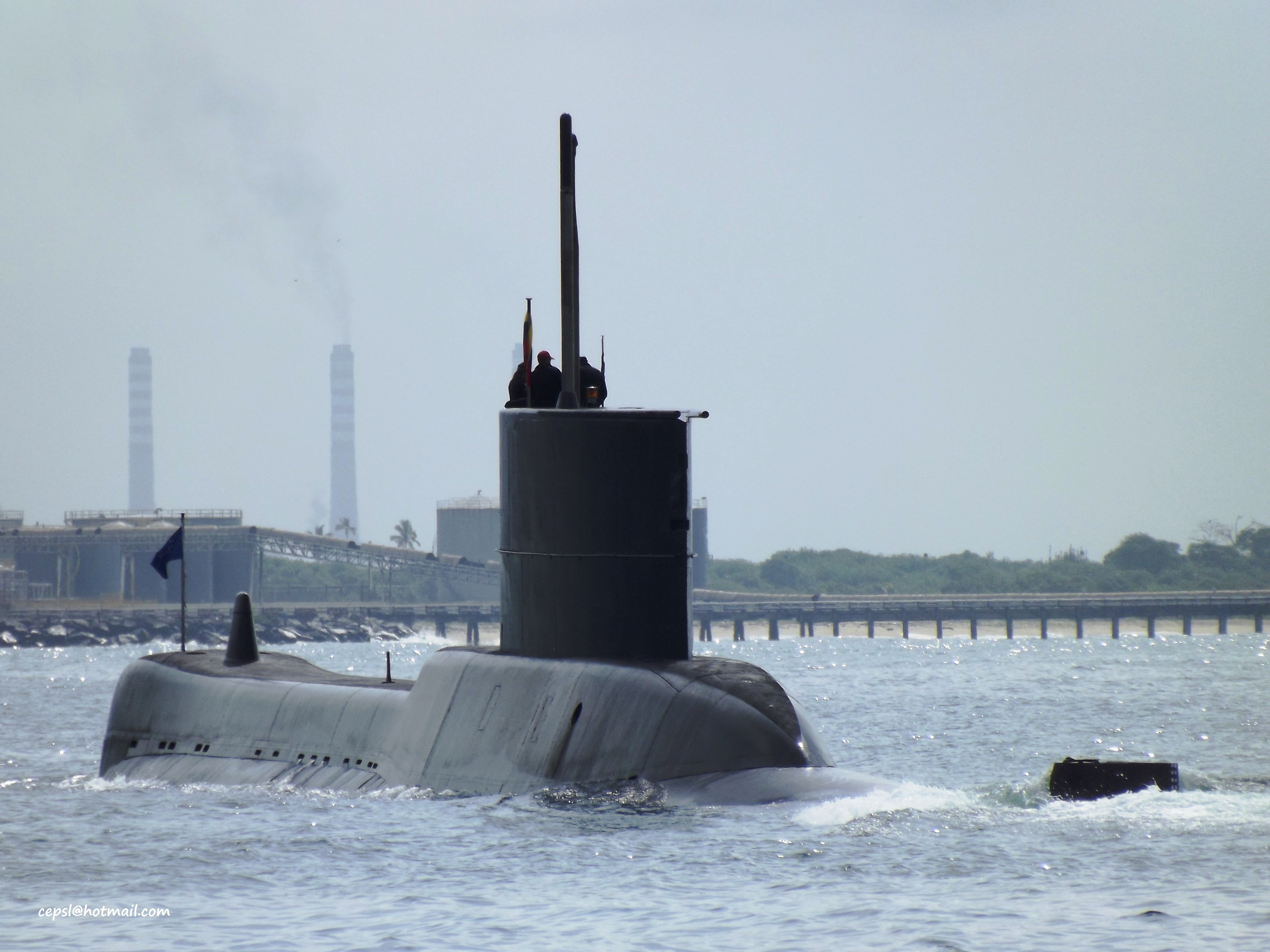
Venezuelan Navy's Type 209/1300's Sabalo (S-31).

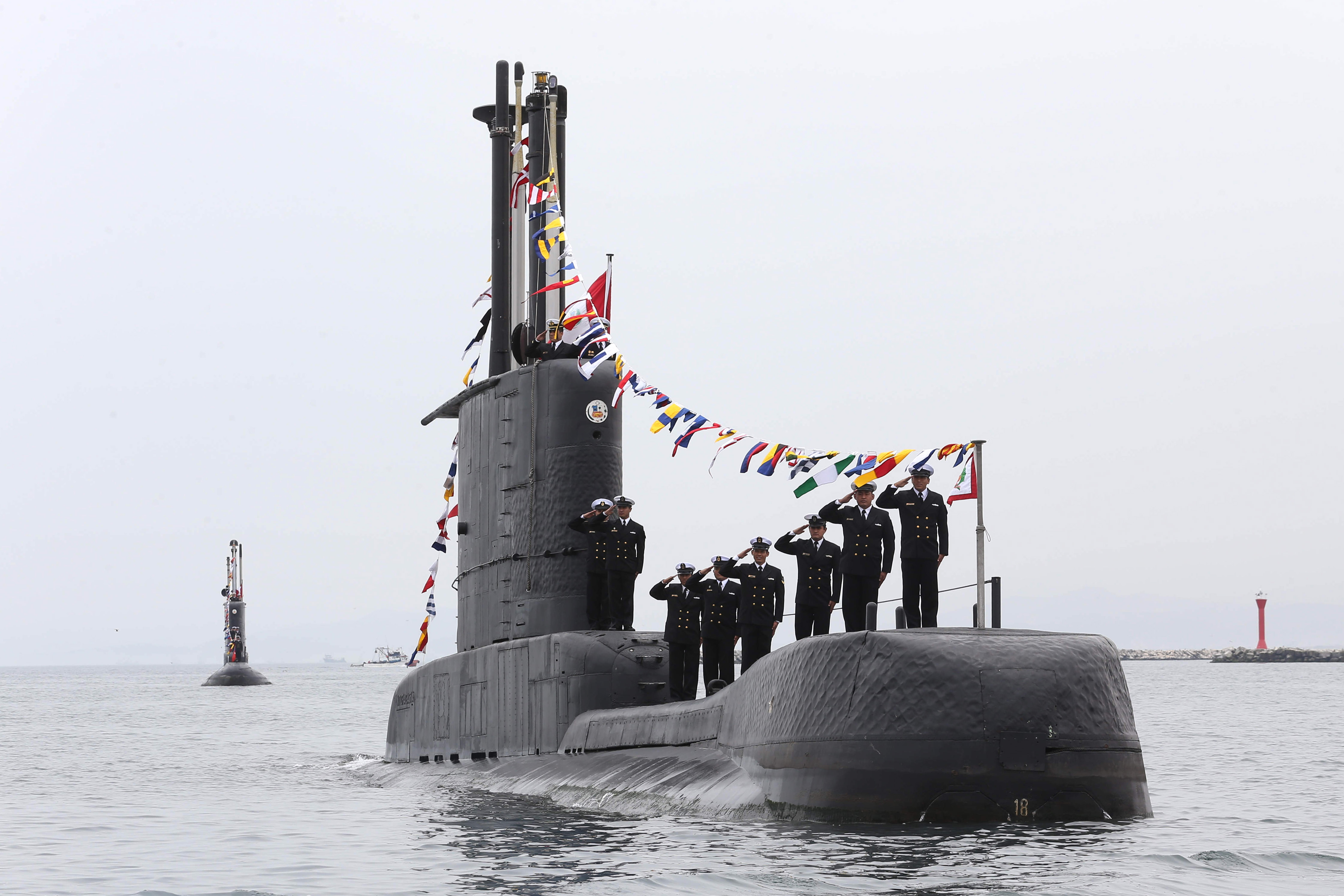
Peruvian Navy's Type 209/1200 Angamos class in 2016.

Colombia commissioned two Type 209/1200s (Pijao class) in 1975.

Peru commissioned two Type 209/1100s (Islay class) in 1975 and four Type 209/1200s (Angamos class) between 1980 and 1983.

The largest operator of the Type 209 is the Turkish Navy which commissioned six Type 209/1200s (Atılay class) between 1976 and 1989, four Type 209/1400s (Preveze class) between 1994 and 1999, and four more Type 209/1400s (Gür class) between 2003 and 2007. Turkey is also the largest operator of German-designed submarines in the world.

Venezuela commissioned two Type 209/1300s (Sabalo class) between 1976 and 1977.

Ecuador commissioned two Type 209/1700s (Shyri class) between 1977 and 1978.

Chile commissioned two Type 209/1400s (Thomson class) in 1984.

Indonesia commissioned two Type 209/1300s (Cakra class) in 1981 and three Type 209/1400s (Nagapasa class) between 2017 and 2021.

Brazil commissioned three Type 209/1400s (Tupi class) between 1989 and 1999 and a fourth in 2005. The latter was built to a modified design, and incorporates an AIP system. A planned fifth ship with the AIP system was cancelled.

Three Type 209/1400 submarines were delivered to South Africa in 2006, costing $285 million each.

India purchased four submarines to the modified Type 209/1500 design in the 1980s and 1990s (see Shishumar class). An option for two more submarines of the same design was planned but not taken up. The last two ships of this class, built locally in India, INS Shalki and INS Shankul are also fitted with UGM-84L Harpoon Block II missiles during upgrades in the 2010s.

Egypt initially ordered two Type-209/1400mod submarines in 2011 and later ordered two more in 2014. The shipbuilder TKMS started building the first submarine S41 (861) in March 2012, the vessel was launched in December 2015 after 57 months of construction work. The Egyptian Navy received the S41 in December 2016, the second submarine S42 was launched during the same month. In April 2017, The S41 arrived at its home port in Alexandria and officially entered service, after a long journey from Kiel. Before reaching its naval base, the S41 conducted its first naval exercise with other units from the Egyptian Navy, ensuring its readiness to join the fleet. The Egyptian submarines have 8 x 21-inch (533 mm) torpedo tubes and are able to carry and launch up to 14 missiles and torpedoes, in addition to deploying naval mines. They will be fitted with SeaHake mod 4 torpedoes and UGM-84L Harpoon Block II missiles.

== Technical specifications ==
	1100	1200	1300	1400	1500
Displacement (submerged)	1,207 t	1,285 t	1,390 t	1,586 t	1,810 t
Dimensions	54.1 × 6.2 × 5.9 m	55.9 × 6.3 × 5.5 m	59.5 × 6.2 × 5.5 m	61.2 × 6.25 × 5.5 m	64.4 × 6.5 × 6.2 m
Pressure Hull Diameter	6.8 m				
Propulsion	Diesel-electric, 4 diesels, 1 shaft				
Propulsion	5,000 shp				6,100 shp (4,500 kW)
Propulsion	4 x 120-cell batteries				4 x 132-cell batteries
Speed (surface)	11 knots (20 km/h)				11.5 knots
Speed (submerged)	21.5 knots			22 knots	22.5 knots
Range (surface)	11,000 nmi (20,000 km) at 10 knots (20 km/h)				
Range (snorkel)	8,000 nmi (15,000 km) at 10 knots (20 km/h)				
Range (submerged)	400 nmi (700 km) at 4 knots (7 km/h)				
Endurance	Variant-dependent				
Maximum depth	500 m				
Armament	8 x 533 mm torpedo tubes: 14 torpedoes; Optional UGM-84 Harpoon integration; Optional Mines				
Crew	31	33		30	36

== Variations ==
Five variants of this submarine have been produced: Type 209/1100, Type 209/1200, Type 209/1300, Type 209/1400 and Type 209/1500. The U-209PN ordered by the Portuguese Navy is actually a Type 214. The first three Dolphin-class submarines built for the Israeli Navy are based on the Type 209 although heavily modified and enlarged.

Several modifications have occurred in the class resulting in these variants including the fitting of newer diesel engines. New air conditioning and electronics features have been added to accommodate orders from South America. The displacement in some variants has increased by nearly 50% in order to install new equipment, modernize accommodations, and extend range.

The team of Ingenieurkontor Lübeck (IKL) and Howaldtswerke-Deutsche Werft (HDW) proposed an enlarged Type 209 submarine, the Type 2000, for Australia's Collins-class submarine program. The proposed design was roughly 500 tons more than the Type 209/1500s for India and lost to the Type 471 from Kockums, an enlarged Västergötland-class submarine.

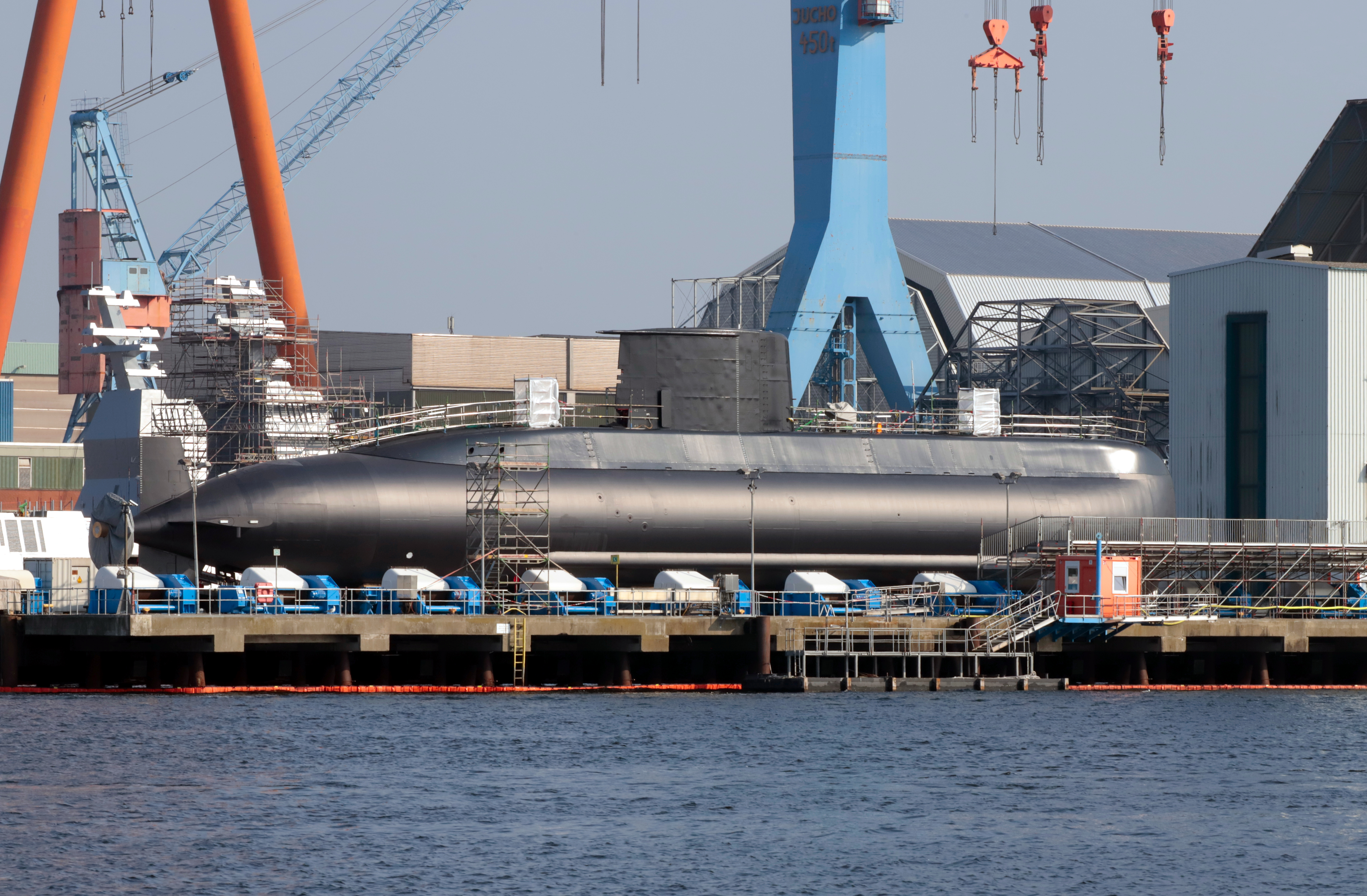
Egyptian Navy's Type 209/1400 S44 at HDW's yard in Kiel, Germany in 2020.

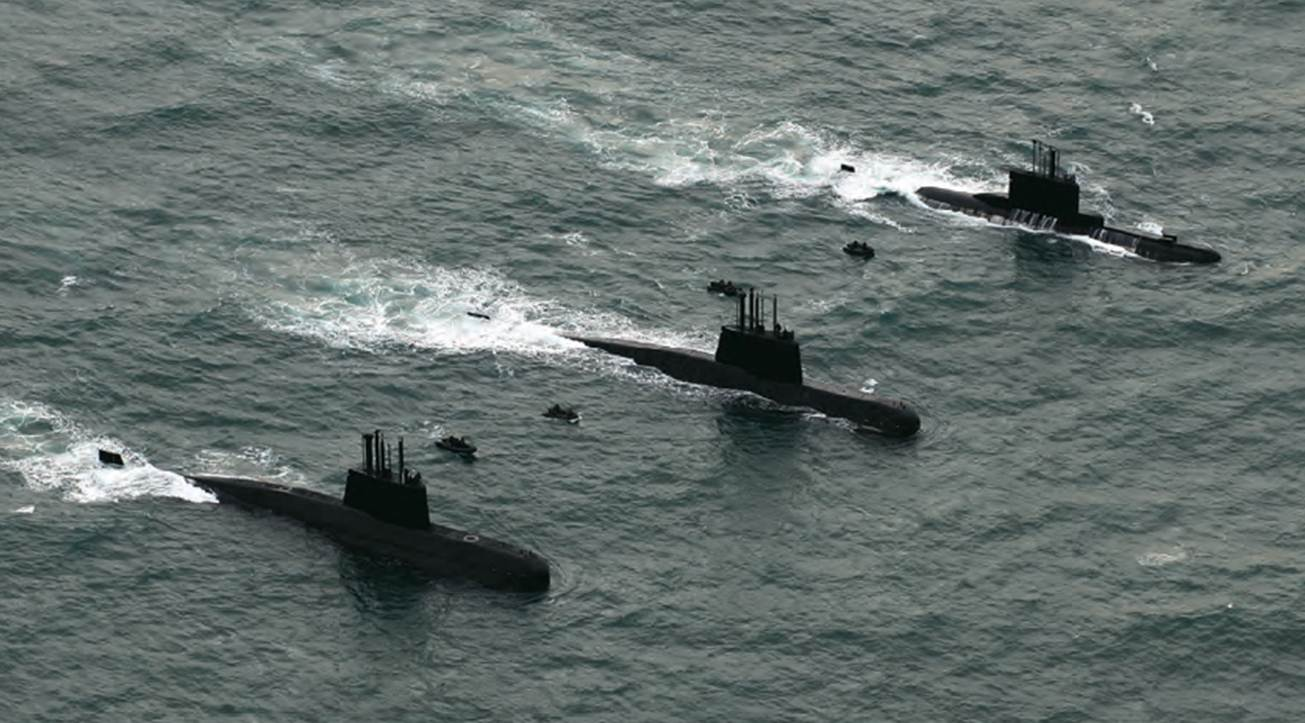
Argentine Navy's Type 209/1200 ARA Salta (S-31) on the right with TR-1700 class ARA San Juan (S-42) and ARA Santa Cruz (S-41).

The Sabalo class built for Venezuela was slightly lengthened during a modernization at HDW in the early 1990s. The increased length is due to the addition of a new sonar dome that is similar to the model found on the German Type 206.

The Tupi class built by the Brazilian Navy is a modified Type 209/1400. The boat is 0.85 m (2 ft 9 in) longer and fitted with higher power diesels, different electric motors, batteries, electronics and sensors.

The Thomson class built for the Chilean Navy has escape hatches fitted in the torpedo and engine room. An additional aft hatch is fitted in the sail with access to the machinery. The boats are fitted with higher masts to compensate for regional ocean wave conditions.

The Shishumar class built for and by India is unique for having an IKL-designed integrated escape sphere. The sphere has accommodations for the entire crew with an eight-hour air supply.

Between 2004 and 2006, the Indonesian Type 209/1300 (Cakra-class) submarine Cakra underwent a refurbishment by Daewoo Shipbuilding & Marine Engineering in South Korea. The refurbished submarine featured new batteries, overhauled engines, and modernized combat systems. In 2009, Daewoo won another order to refurbish Nanggala, which was completed in early 2012. During the two refurbishments, the submarines' existing STN Atlas-Elektronik CSU 3-2 sonar suites were replaced with L-3 ELAC Nautik's LOPAS 8300 passive sonar system and Kongsberg MSI-90U MK2 CMS.

It is also possible to upgrade these submarines with the latest air-independent propulsion (AIP) systems. The first ships to receive this upgrade were to be three ships of the Greek Poseidon class Type 209/1200 under the Neptune II upgrade program. They were to be upgraded by cutting the boat in half aft of the control room and adding a 6 m (19 ft 8 in) plug with a 120 kW Siemens AIP system to the ship. The program was canceled in 2009 due to cancellation of the Archimedes Project (Type 214), but not before Okeanos (S118) completed the upgrade. After the Archimedes Project settlement was reached, it was decided that instead of upgrading the remaining two Type 209s, two additional Type 214 ships were to be ordered, but that deal was cancelled by Howaldtswerke-Deutsche Werft. Turkish Navy's AIP upgrade of Atılay class (209 Type 1200) was also shelved in favor of acquiring new Type 214 subs.

=== Jang Bogo upgrades ===
The South Korean Jang Bogo-class submarines (Hangul: 장보고급 잠수함, Hanja: 張保皐級潛水艦) have reportedly been heavily upgraded in the 21st century, which if undertaken was supposed to include domestic hull stretch augmentation from 1,200 tons to 1,400 tons and installment of domestically developed Torpedo Acoustic Counter Measures (TACM). Some upgrades could have been affected or altered due to Korean economic problems of the late 1990s, which modified other plans to acquire nine 1,500-ton AIP-equipped boats or upgrade six 1200 boats to 1,500-tons AIP-equipped boats, although the more ambitious plan to acquire nine 1,800-ton Type 214 AIP submarines was preserved and put under progress, not unaided by the quick recovery of the South Korean economy in 1999, which will reportedly be wrapped up in 2018 when all submarines of the type are scheduled to be commissioned. LIG Nex1 began producing TACM for unspecified submarine types of the ROKN as well, which finished development in 2000. Outfitting of the submarines with Sub-Harpoon launching capability was a part of the upgrade, and seems to have been carried out on several submarines by 2008. They can equip the White Shark heavy torpedo, and can possibly equip submarine-launched Hae Sung anti-ship missiles later on. AIP and flank-array sonars are planned for future modernizations.

In December 2011, Daewoo won a contract to build Indonesia three 1,400-ton Jang Bogo class (the Nagapasa-class) submarines for $1.07 billion. Construction of the submarines will start in January 2012 for delivery by 2015 and 2016, for commissioning in the first half of 2018. They will be equipped with torpedoes and guided missiles. The submarines are described as being Korea's original model, bigger and more advanced than Indonesia's refurbished Type 209/1300. Initially the offered submarines were going to be in-service ROKN submarines. The sale will be done without the involvement of German companies. South Korea is currently the only country outside Germany independently offering the Type 209 for sale. Indonesia was also offered two license built Type 209 submarines manufactured by a group of Turkish (SSM - Undersecretariat for Defense Industries) and German companies (HDW/ThyssenKrupp), a deal reported to be valued at $1 billion. SSM was also offering the leases of Type 209 submarines until new submarines could be completed. The offer has since been superseded by the DSME submarine contract. The three new submarines would be equipped with the Kongsberg MSI-90U MK2 combat systems, Indra's Pegaso RESM system and Aries-S LPI radar.

== Operators ==
Operator	Class name	Type					Notes
Operator	Class name	1100	1200	1300	1400	1500	Notes
Argentine Navy	Salta class		1(1*)				ARA Salta (S-31) underwent midlife upgrades from 1988 to 1995 and 2004 to 2005. As of 2021 used for dock side training only. (*) ARA San Luis (S-32) stricken in 1997 after incomplete overhaul.
Brazilian Navy	Tupi class				1(1*)		All Type 209's fitted with new combat systems capable of using the Mk.48 torpedo. (*) Tikuna (S-34) is a modified Type 209/1400. Additional modified Type 209/1400 Tapuia (S-35) cancelled. As of 15 September 2023, Tupi (S-30) and Tikuna (S-34) remain in active service.
Chilean Navy	Thomson class				2		Simpson (SS-21); Thomson (SS-20) refit and upgrade was completed in early 2009, this works include integration of SUBTICS combat management system and BlackShark torpedoes.
Colombian National Navy	Pijao class		2				Both scheduled to be upgraded between 2009 and 2011 in the state-owned shipyard COTECMAR, with the assistance of HDW.
Ecuadorian Navy	Shyri class			2			Shyri (S101) completed its mid-life upgrade at Chilean shipyard ASMAR in November 2014. Huancavilca (S102) completed its modernization at ASMAR and returned to active service in November 2014.
Egyptian Navy	Type 209/1400mod				4		S41 (861) officially entered service in April 2017. S42 (864) was handed over to the Egyptian Navy in August 2017. S43 (867) was received by the Egyptian Navy in April 2020. S44 (870) was received by the Egyptian Navy in July 2021.
Hellenic Navy	Glavkos class Poseidon class	2(2*)	4				Glavkos class overhauled under the Neptune I program from 1993 to 2000. Poseidon-class Neptune II upgrade program cancelled, but not before Okeanos (S118) completed the upgrade. (*) Glavkos (S-110) was decommissioned on 9 June 2011. (*) Protefs (S-113) was decommissioned on 16 May 2022, and is planned to be preserved as a museum.
Indian Navy	Shishumar class					4	Option for two additional Indian built boats not taken up after several reviews. Equipped with integrated escape sphere for full crew. Underwent midlife refits from 1999 to 2005, talks underway with HDW for additional upgrades.
Indonesian Navy	Cakra class Nagapasa class			1(1*)	3		KRI Cakra was refitted by Daewoo Shipbuilding & Marine Engineering, South Korea between 2004 and 2006. KRI Nanggala refit contract was awarded to Daewoo in 2009 and completed in 2012. Indonesia has awarded DSME a contract for three 1,400 ton Jang Bogo-class (locally known as Nagapasa-class) submarines in December 2011. The third vessel was commissioned in April 2021. (*) KRI Nanggala was sunk on 21 April 2021.
Republic of Korea Navy	Jang Bogo class		9				Further information in #Jang Bogo upgrades section
Peruvian Navy	Islay class Angamos class	2	4				Both 209/1100 (Islay class) were locally upgraded in 2008. Upgrade of the 209/1200 (Angamos class) is in process.
South African Navy	Heroine class				3		Commissioned between 2006 and 2008 replacing Daphné-class boats.
Turkish Naval Forces	Atılay class Preveze class Gür class		4(2*)		8		Atılay-class mid-life refit with AIP propulsion cancelled. Early Atılay-class ships will be replaced by Type 214 submarines starting in 2020. Modernization for Doğanay (S-351) and Dolunay (S-352) will include new periscopes, ESM, and Inertial Navigation Systems. (*) 2 Atılay class, Atılay (S-347) and Saldıray (S-348) was decommissioned in 2016 and 2014 respectively.
Bolivarian Navy of Venezuela	Sabalo class			2			Sabalo modernized in the state-owned shipyard DIANCA from 2004 to 2011, included new computer, engineering, mast, and snorkel systems. As of 2020, the operational status of the boats was unclear.

== Individual boats ==
Country	Class name	Type	Pennant	Name	Commissioned	Decommissioned
Argentina	Salta class	1200	S-31	Salta	1974	In reserve
Argentina	Salta class	1200	S-32	San Luis	1974	23 April 1997
Brazil	Tupi class	1400	S30	Tupi	1989	
Brazil	Tupi class	1400	S31	Tamoio	1994	14 September 2023
Brazil	Tupi class	1400	S32	Timbira	1996	17 February 2023; sunk as target in April 2026
Brazil	Tupi class	1400	S33	Tapajó	1999	11 August 2023
Brazil	Tupi class	1400mod	S34	Tikuna	2005	
Chile	Thomson class	1400L	SS-20	Thomson	1984	
Chile	Thomson class	1400L	SS-21	Simpson	1984	
Colombia	Pijao class	1200	S-28	Pijao	1975	
Colombia	Pijao class	1200	S-29	Tayrona	1975	
Ecuador	Shyri class	1300	S101	Shyri	1977	
Ecuador	Shyri class	1300	S102	Huancavilca	1978	
Egypt	Type 209/1400mod	1400mod	861	S41	2017	
Egypt	Type 209/1400mod	1400mod	864	S42	2017	
Egypt	Type 209/1400mod	1400mod	867	S43	2020	
Egypt	Type 209/1400mod	1400mod		S44	2021	
Greece	Glavkos class	1100	S-110	Glavkos	1971	9 June 2011
Greece	Glavkos class	1100	S-111	Nirefs	1972	
Greece	Glavkos class	1100	S-112	Triton	1972	
Greece	Glavkos class	1100	S-113	Proteus	1972	16 May 2022; serving as a submarine museum, September 2022
Greece	Poseidon class	1200	S-116	Poseidon	1979	
Greece	Poseidon class	1200	S-117	Amfitriti	1979	
Greece	Poseidon class	1200AIP	S-118	Okeanos	1979	Tower of used at Memorial of Fallen Submarine Crew of World War II in Flisvos Park
Greece	Poseidon class	1200	S-119	Pontos	1979	
India	Shishumar class	1500	S44	Shishumar	1986	
India	Shishumar class	1500	S45	Shankush	1986	
India	Shishumar class	1500	S46	Shalki	1992	
India	Shishumar class	1500	S47	Shankul	1994	
Indonesia	Cakra class	1300	401	Cakra	1981	
Indonesia	Cakra class	1300	402	Nanggala	1981	On 21 April 2021, missing during a torpedo drill in the waters north of Bali. Wreckage found 24 April 2021.
Indonesia	Nagapasa class	1400	403	Nagapasa	2017	
Indonesia	Nagapasa class	1400	404	Ardadedali	2018	
Indonesia	Nagapasa class	1400	405	Alugoro	2021	
Peru	Angamos class	1200	SS-31	Angamos ex-Casma	1980	
Peru	Angamos class	1200	SS-32	Antofagasta	1980	
Peru	Angamos class	1200	SS-33	Pisagua ex-Blume	1982	
Peru	Angamos class	1200	SS-34	Chipana ex-Pisagua	1983	
Peru	Islay class	1100	SS-35	Islay	1975	
Peru	Islay class	1100	SS-36	Arica	1975	
South Africa	Heroine class	1400mod	S101	Manthatisi	2005	
South Africa	Heroine class	1400mod	S102	Charlotte Maxeke	2007	
South Africa	Heroine class	1400mod	S103	Queen Modjadji	2008	
Republic of Korea	Jang Bogo class	1200	SS-061	Jang Bogo	1993	
Republic of Korea	Jang Bogo class	1200	SS-062	Lee Chun	1994	
Republic of Korea	Jang Bogo class	1200	SS-063	Choe Museon	1996	
Republic of Korea	Jang Bogo class	1200	SS-065	Park Wi	1996	
Republic of Korea	Jang Bogo class	1200	SS-066	Lee Jongmoo	1996	
Republic of Korea	Jang Bogo class	1200	SS-067	Jung Woon	1998	
Republic of Korea	Jang Bogo class	1200	SS-068	Yi Sun-sin	2000	
Republic of Korea	Jang Bogo class	1200	SS-069	Na Dae-yong	2000	
Republic of Korea	Jang Bogo class	1200	SS-071	Yi Eokgi	2001	
Turkey	Atılay class	1200	S-347	Atılay	1976	30 November 2016
Turkey	Atılay class	1200	S-348	Saldıray	1977	14 November 2014
Turkey	Atılay class	1200	S-349	Batıray	1978	
Turkey	Atılay class	1200	S-350	Yıldıray	1981	
Turkey	Atılay class	1200	S-351	Doğanay	1984	
Turkey	Atılay class	1200	S-352	Dolunay	1989	
Turkey	Preveze class	1400.T1	S-353	Preveze	1994	
Turkey	Preveze class	1400.T1	S-354	Sakarya	1995	
Turkey	Preveze class	1400.T1	S-355	18 Mart	1998	
Turkey	Preveze class	1400.T1	S-356	Anafartalar	1999	
Turkey	Gür class	1400.T2	S-357	Gür	2003	
Turkey	Gür class	1400.T2	S-358	Çanakkale	2005	
Turkey	Gür class	1400.T2	S-359	Burakreis	2006	
Turkey	Gür class	1400.T2	S-360	Birinci İnönü	2007	
Venezuela	Sabalo class	1300	S-31	Sabalo	1976	
Venezuela	Sabalo class	1300	S-32	Caribe	1977	

== Gallery ==
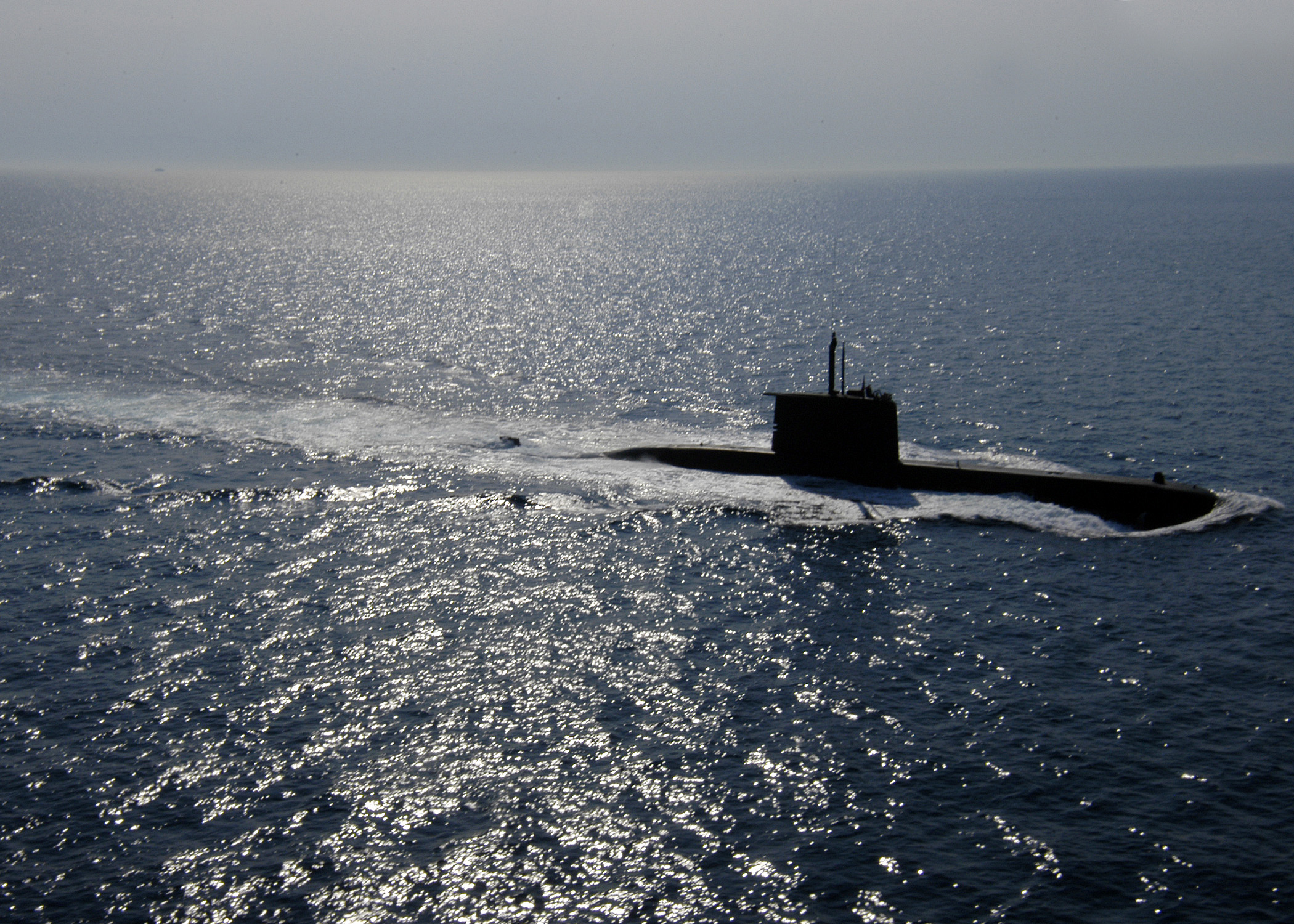
TCG Preveze (S-353) of the Turkish Navy surfaces during Exercise Sorbet Royal

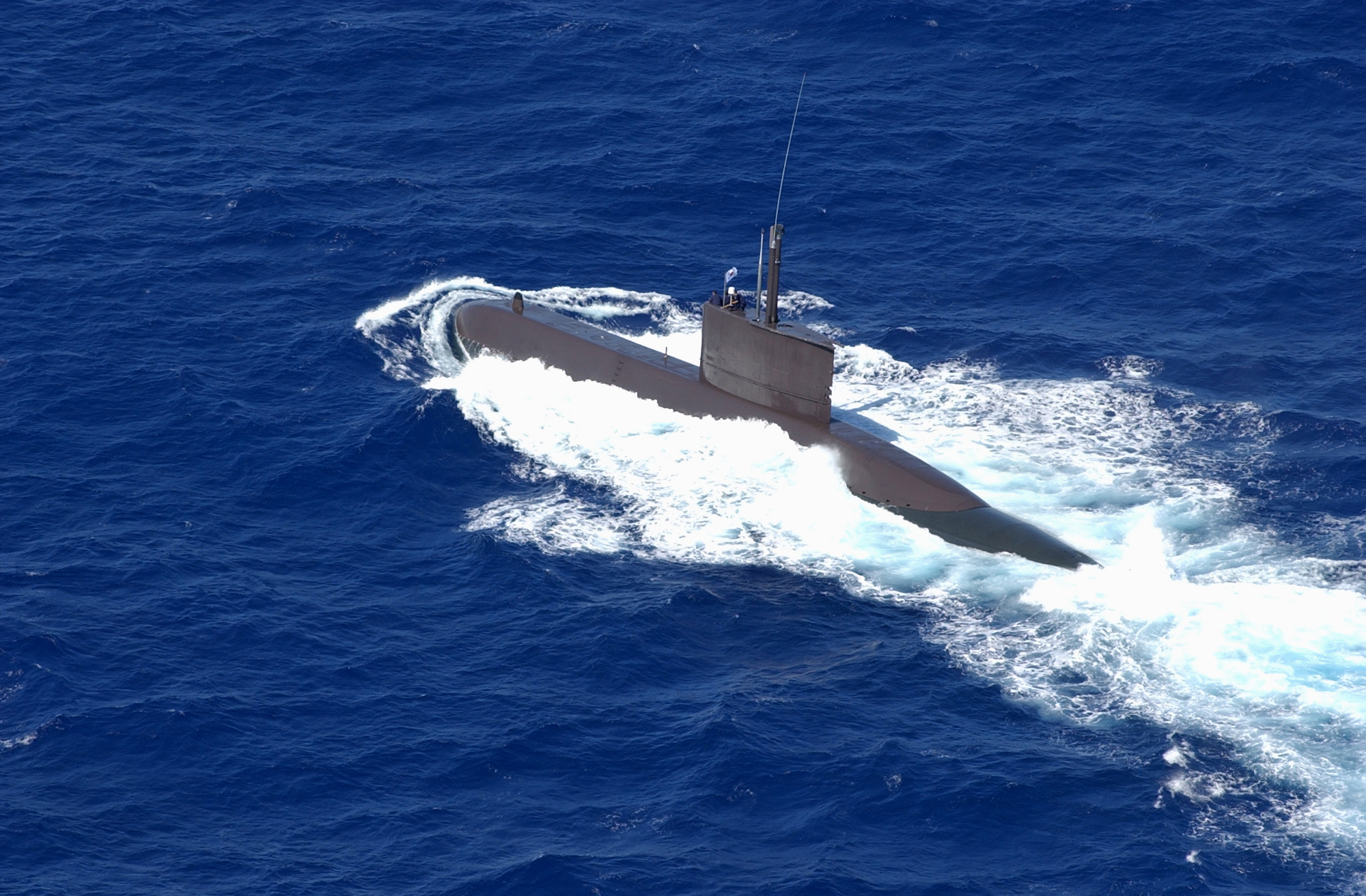
Republic of Korea Navy's Jang Bogo-class Type 209/1200 submarine Nadaeyong surfacing during a SINKEX for Rim of the Pacific RIMPAC 2002

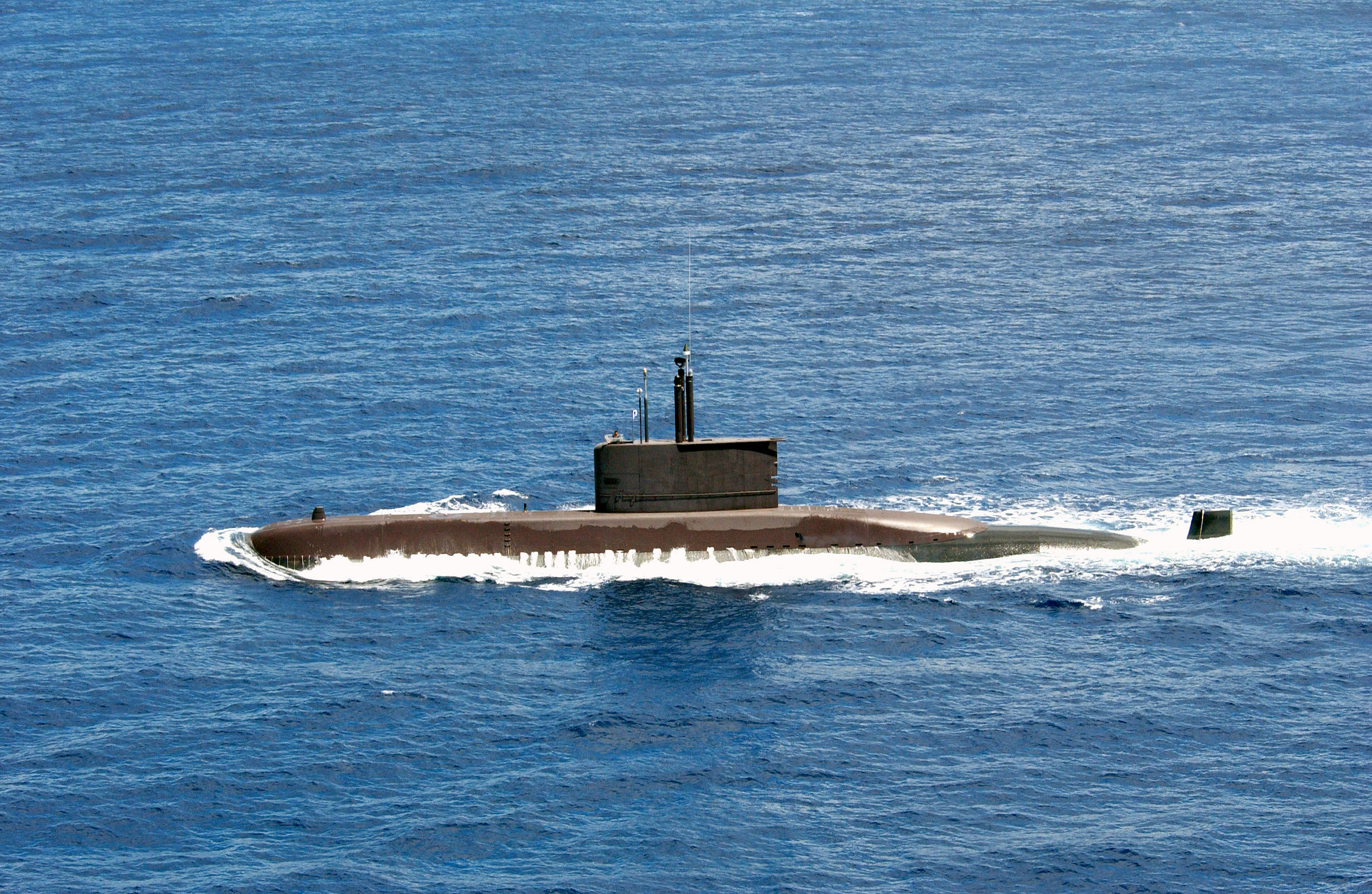
Republic of Korea Navy's Jang Bogo-class Type 209/1200 submarine Jang Bogo heads out to sea during exercise Rim of the Pacific (RIMPAC) 2004.

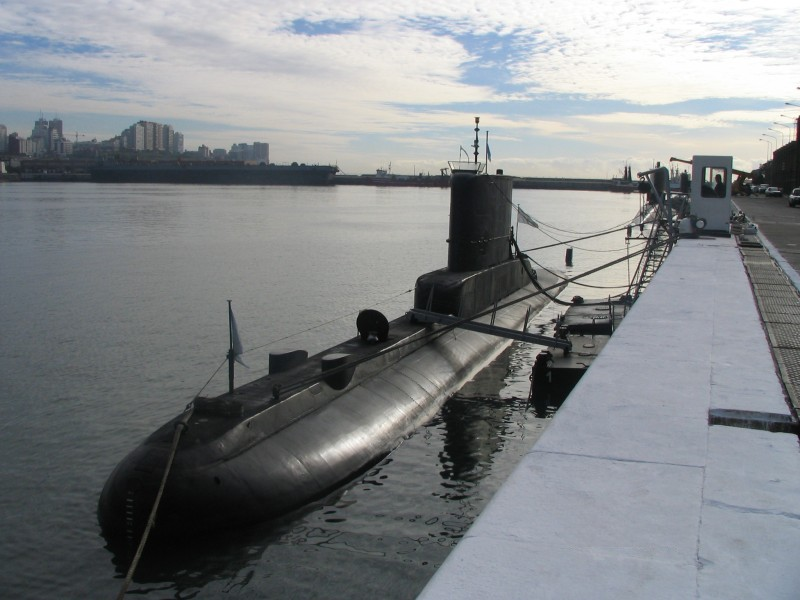

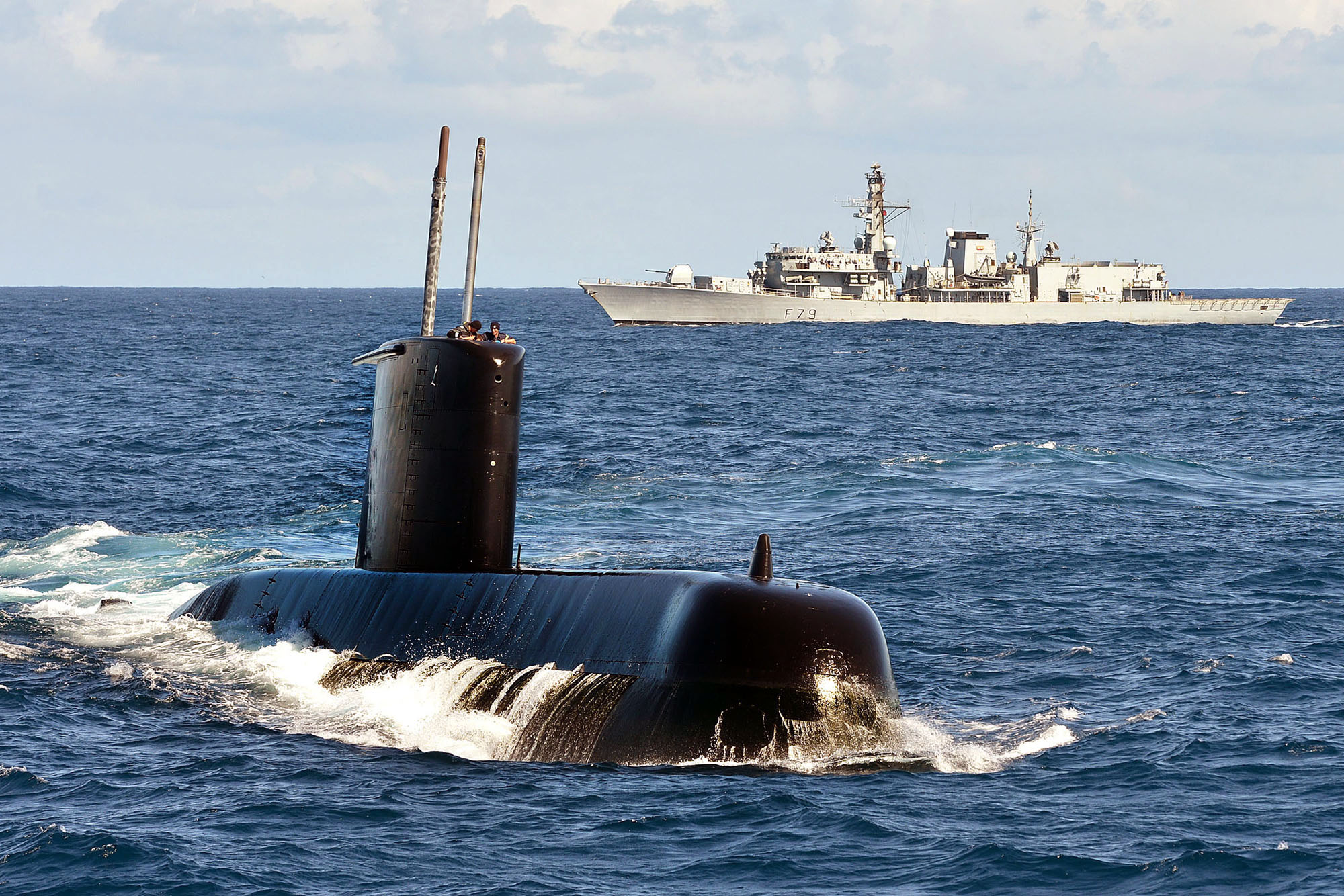
South Africa's Charlotte Maxeke with Britain's HMS Portland in 2014

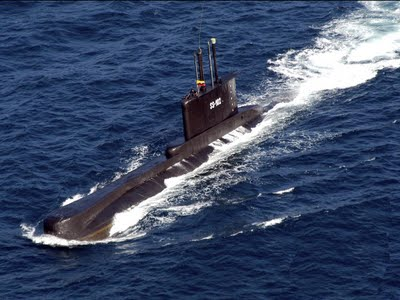

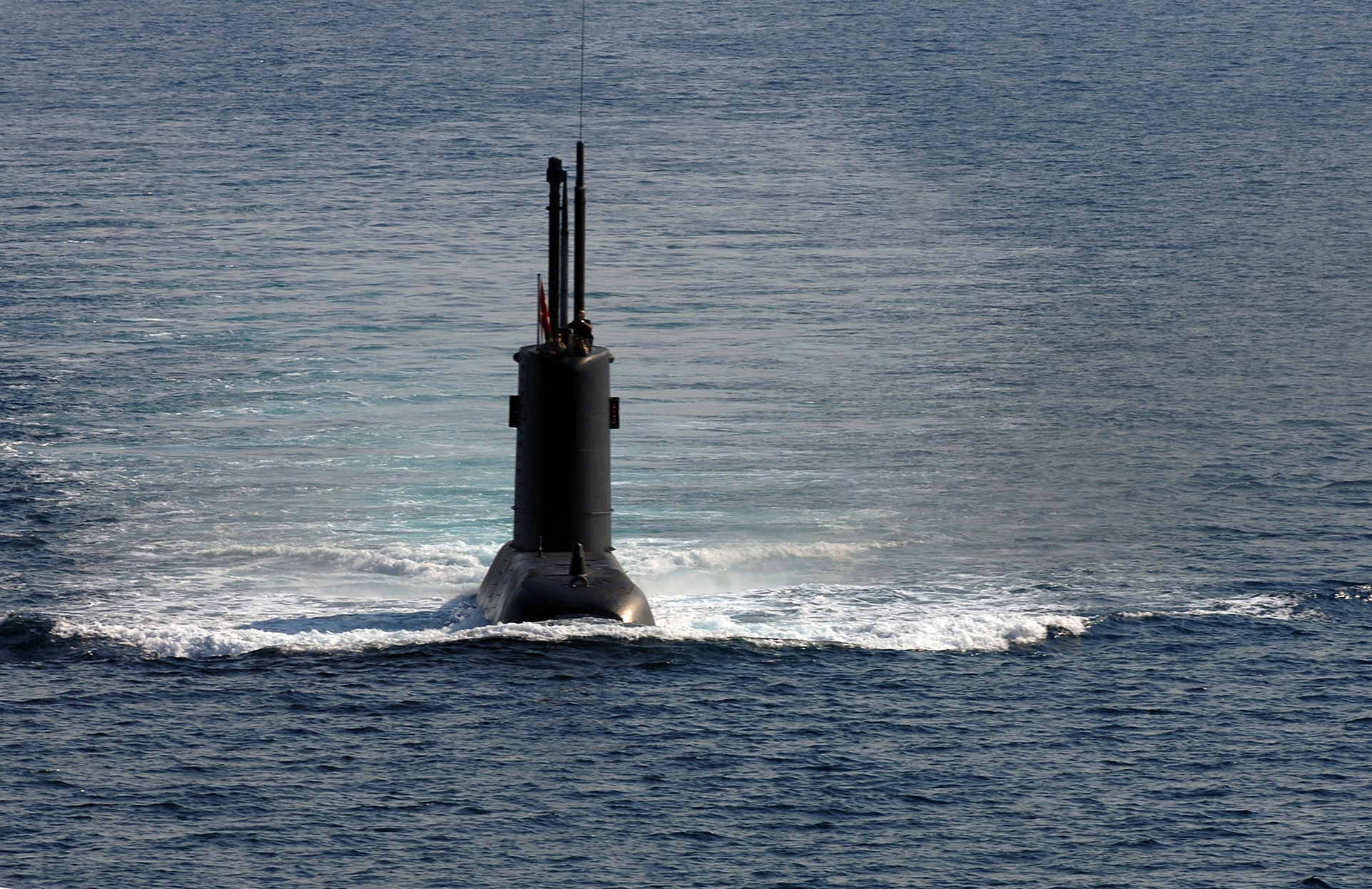

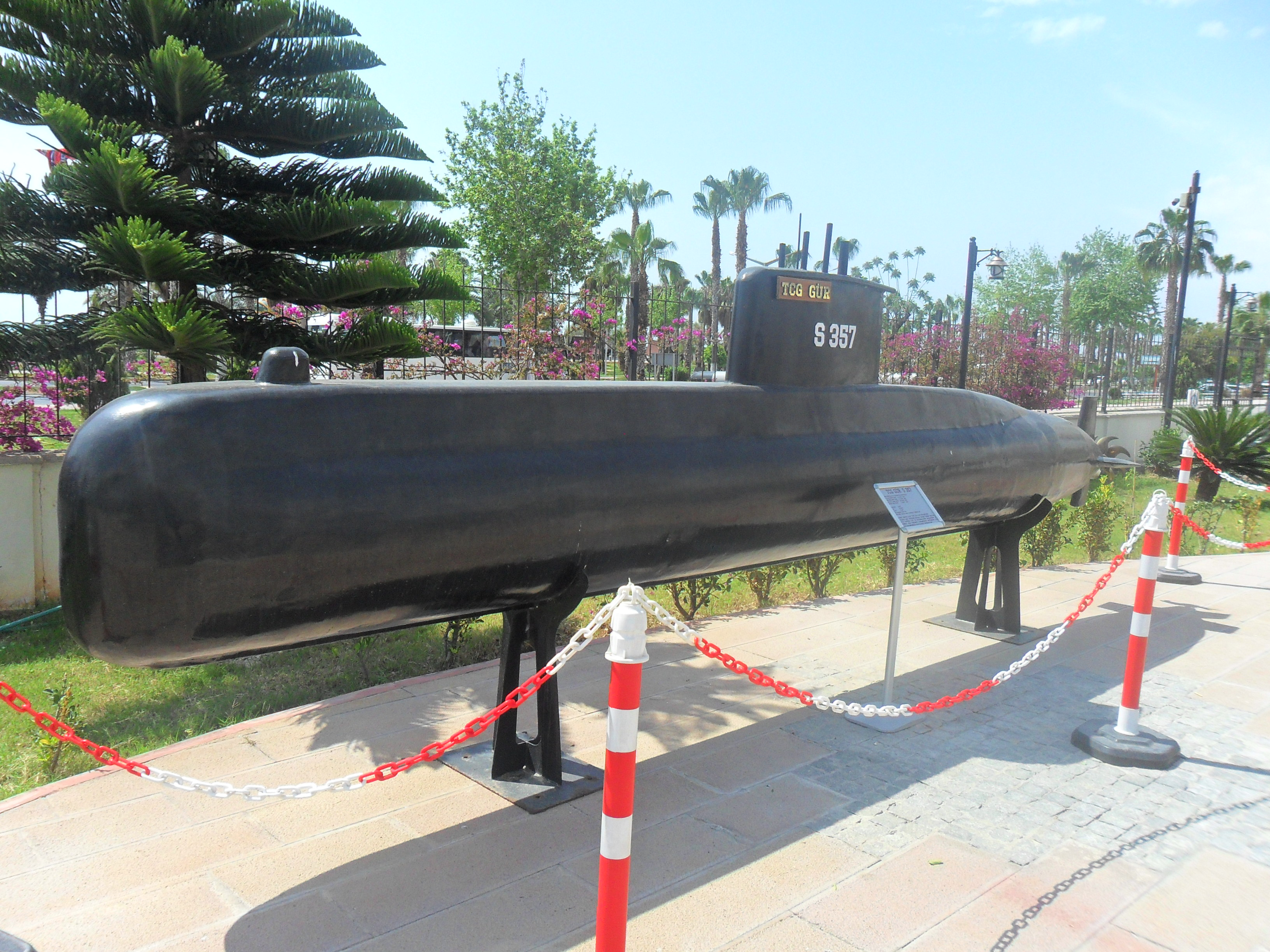

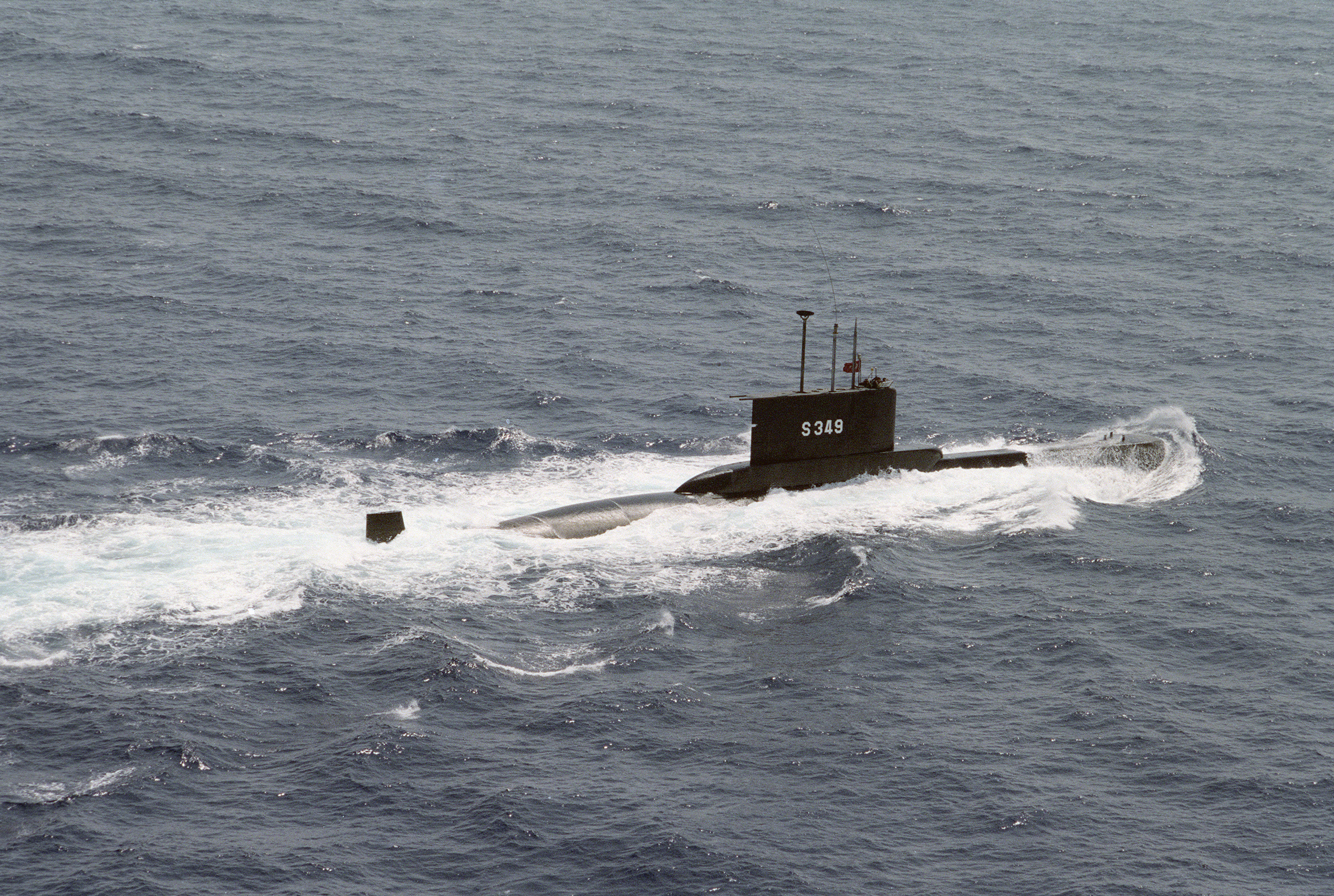

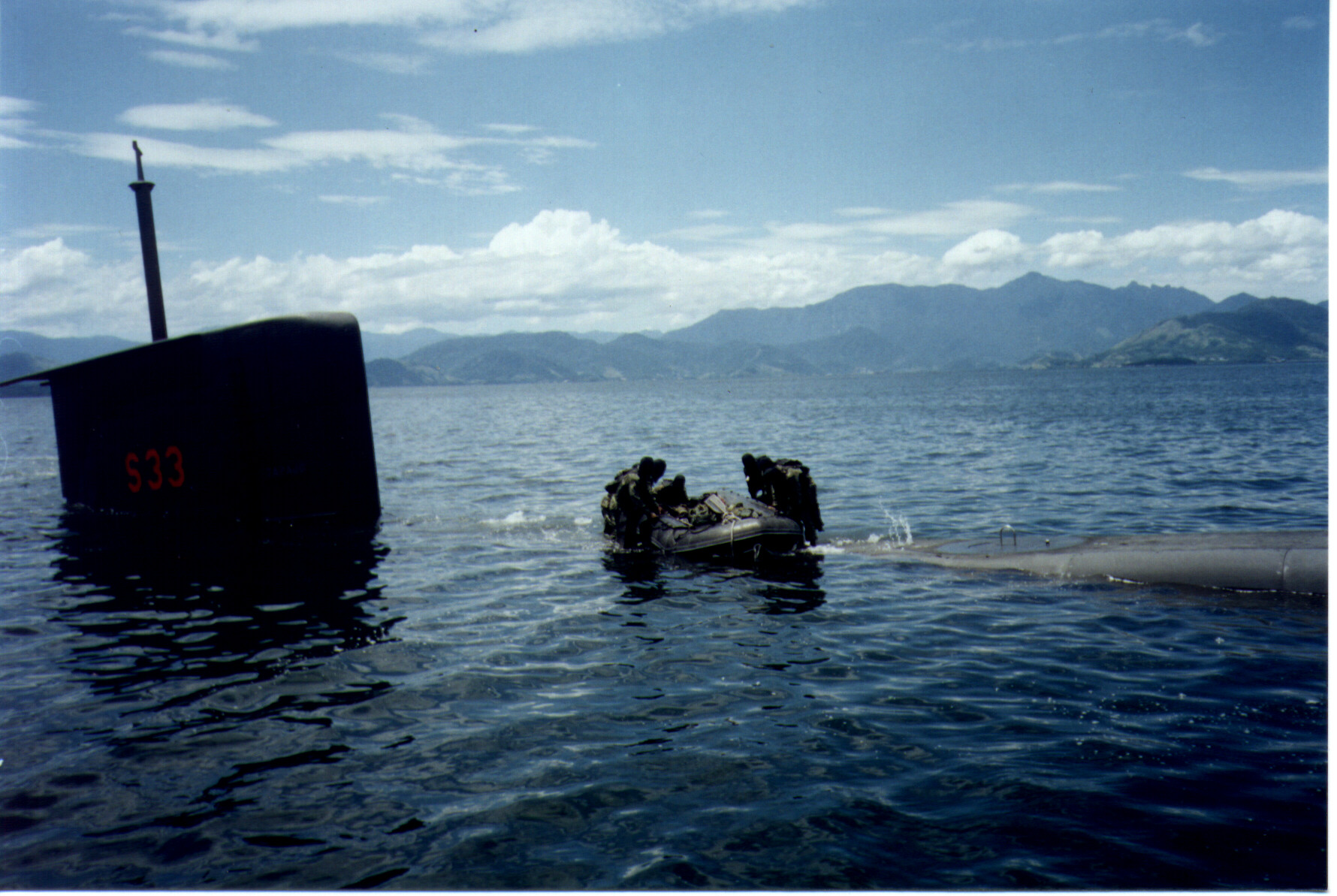
GRUMEC operators deploying from the Brazilian Navy's Tapajó.

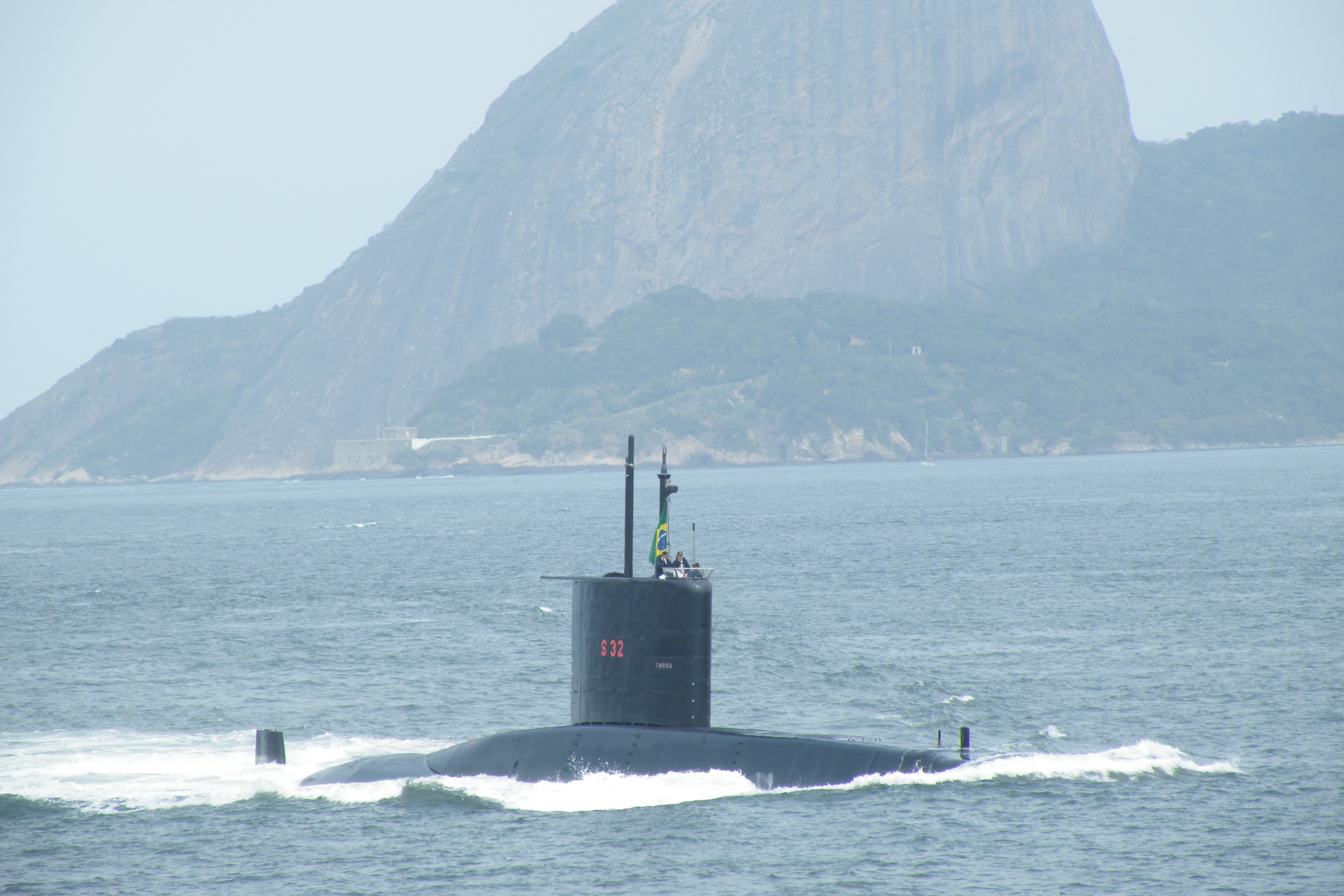
Brazilian Navy's Type 209 submarine Timbira

== See also ==
- List of submarine classes in service

Equivalent submarines of the same era

- Sauro class
- Agosta class
- Näcken class
- Sava class
