= List of ship commissionings in 2018 =

The list of ship commissionings in 2018 includes a chronological list of all ships commissioned in 2018.

	Operator	Ship	Flag	Class and type	Pennant	Other notes
10 January	Indonesian Navy	I Gusti Ngurah Rai		Martadinata-class frigate	332	
3 February	United States Navy	Omaha		Independence-class littoral combat ship	LCS-12	For U.S. Navy
17 March	United States Navy	Colorado		Virginia-class attack submarine	SSN-788	For U.S. Navy
24 March	United States Navy	Ralph Johnson		Arleigh Burke-class destroyer	DDG-114	For U.S. Navy
13 April	Royal Navy	Forth		River-class patrol vessel	P222	For Royal Navy
25 April	Indonesian Navy	Ardadedali		Nagapasa-class submarine	404	For U.S. Navy
26 May	United States Navy	Manchester		Independence-class littoral combat ship	LCS-14	For U.S. Navy
20 June	Russian Navy	Ivan Gren		Ivan Gren-class landing ship	135	For Russian Navy
28 June	Royal Navy	Magpie		Inshore survey vessel	H130	For Royal Navy
25 July	Royal Navy	Tyne		River-class OPV	P281	Recommissioned
29 September	United States Navy	Indiana		Virginia-class attack submarine	SSN-789	For U.S. Navy
17 November	United States Navy	Sioux City		Freedom-class littoral combat ship	LCS-11	For U.S. Navy
1 December	United States Navy	Thomas Hudner		Arleigh Burke-class destroyer	DDG-116	For U.S. Navy
1 December	Islamic Republic of Iran Navy	Sahand		Moudge-class frigate	74	
