= Underwater warfare =

One of the four operational areas of naval warfare

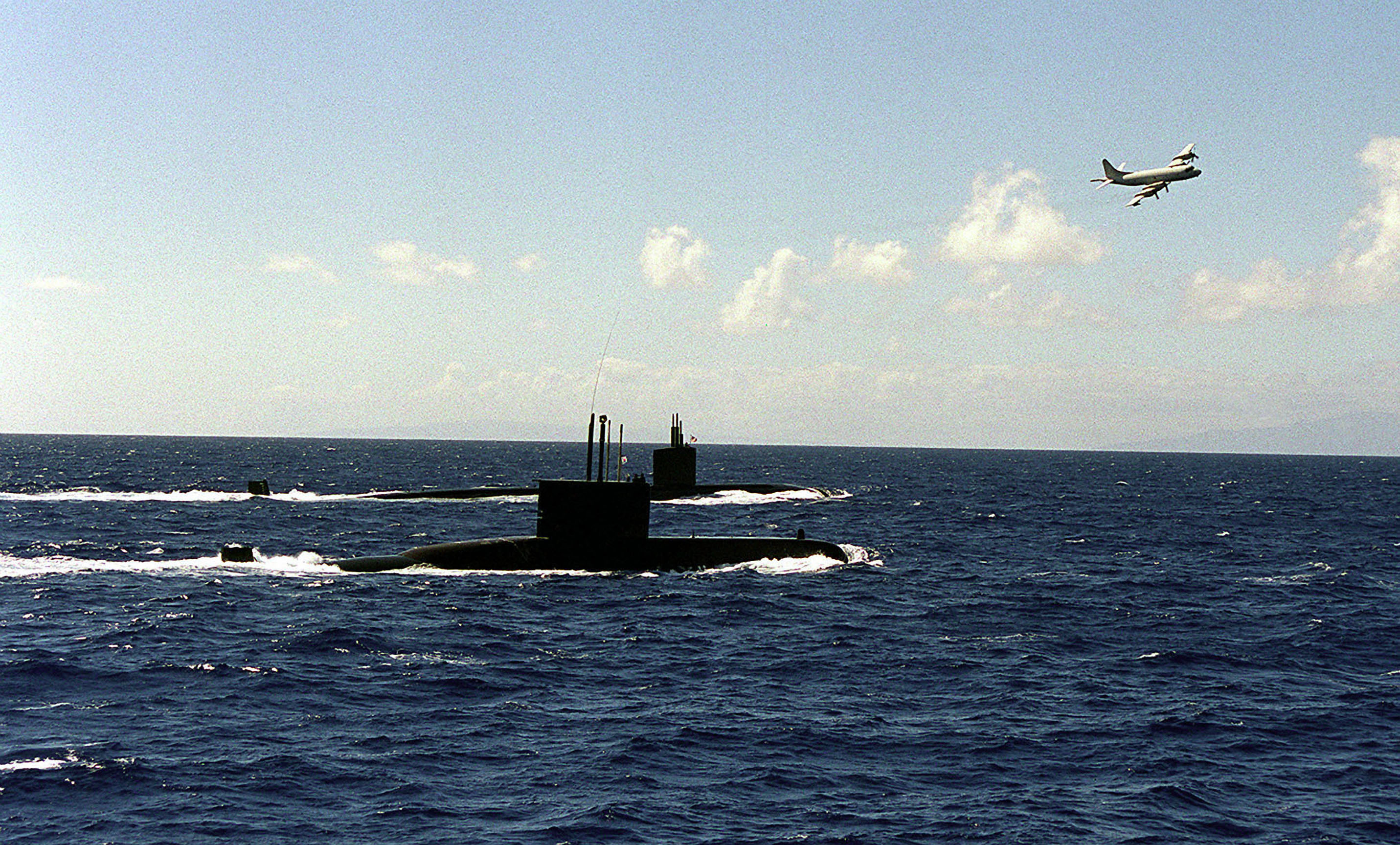
ROKS Lee Jongmoo (SS-066) and USS Columbus (SSN-762) off the coast of Hawaii; a United States Navy P-3 Orion can be seen observing them nearby.

Underwater warfare, also known as undersea warfare or subsurface warfare, is naval warfare involving underwater vehicle or combat operations conducted underwater. It is one of the four operational areas of naval warfare, the others being surface warfare, aerial warfare, and information warfare. Underwater warfare includes:

- Actions by submarines actions, and anti-submarine warfare, i.e. warfare between submarines, other submarines and surface ships; combat airplanes and helicopters may also be engaged when launching special dive-bombs and torpedo-missiles against submarines;
- Underwater special operations, considering:
  - Military diving sabotage against ships and ports.
  - Anti-frogman techniques.
  - Reconnaissance tasks.

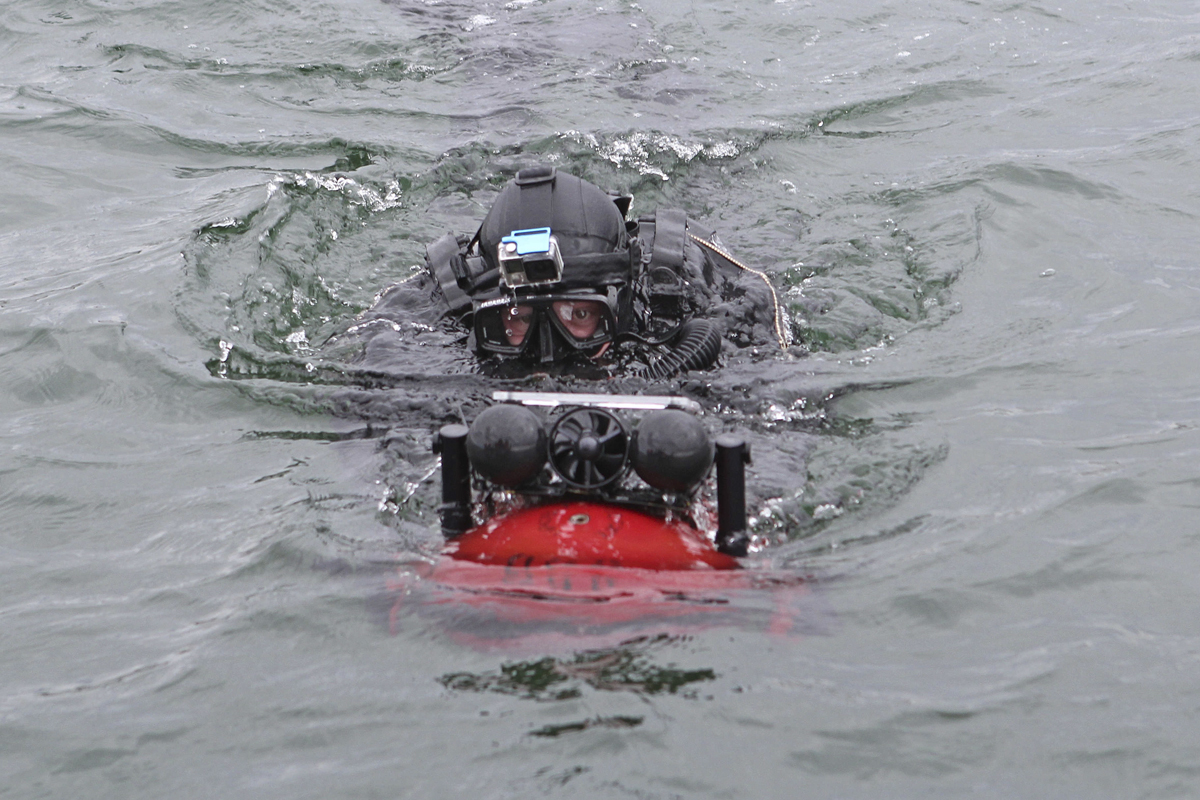
A Russian Navy frogman during training in 2017

== History ==
In the 20th century underwater warfare was dominated by the submarine. They first came to prevalence during the First World War, when German U-boats attacked and sank many allied vessels, such as the sinking of the Lusitania in 1915. A similar scenario occurred during the Second World War, when German U-boats launched a prolonged campaign against Allied shipping, especially in the mid-Atlantic. Japanese submarines also played a minimal role on the Pacific front, and American submarines sank a total of 5.3 million tons of Axis shipping throughout the war, most of which was scored against the Japanese. In the 21st century unmanned underwater vehicles are coming to play a significant part in underwater warfare.

The first combat submarine was the "Turtle" created by David Bushnell in 1776 and was used during the revolutionary war in an attempt to attach a bomb to a British Flagship.

== Seabed warfare ==
Seabed warfare is defined as "operations to, from and across the ocean floor." In general the target of seabed warfare is infrastructure in place on the seabed such as power cables, telecom cables, or natural resource extraction systems.

== See also ==
- Commando
- Frogman
- List of military special forces units
- Naval tactics
- Spetsnaz
