= KRI Alugoro =

Submarine of the Indonesian Navy

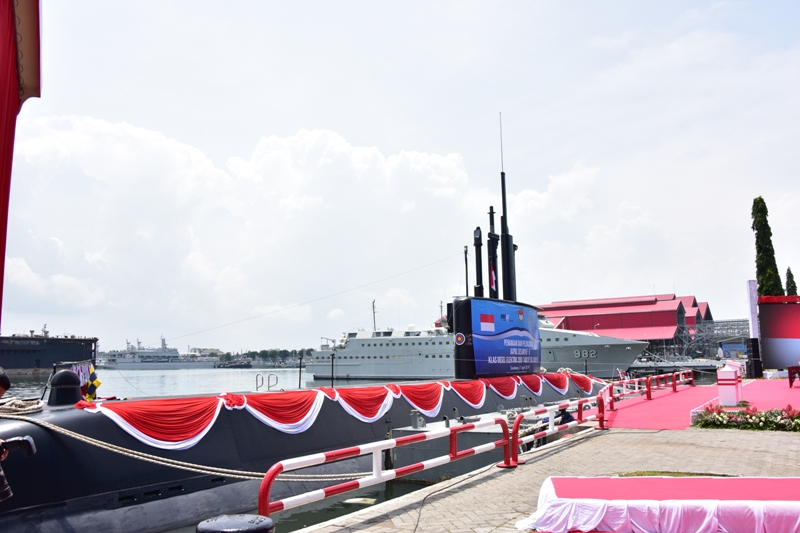
- KRI Alugoro during its launching ceremony

History

Indonesia
- Name: KRI Alugoro
- Namesake: Prabu Baladewa's gada
- Ordered: 21 December 2011
- Awarded: Daewoo Shipbuilding & Marine Engineering; PT PAL
- Launched: 11 April 2019
- Commissioned: 6 April 2021
- Identification: 405
- Status: Active

General characteristics
- Class & type: Nagapasa-class submarine
- Displacement: 1,400 tons
- Length: 61.3 m (201 ft 1 in)
- Beam: 6.3 m (20 ft 8 in)
- Draft: 5.5 m (18 ft 1 in)
- Propulsion: 4 x MTU 12V493 diesel generators; 3,700 kW (5,000 shp)
- Speed: 11 knots (20 km/h; 13 mph) surfaced; 21.5 knots (39.8 km/h; 24.7 mph) submerged
- Range: 11,000 nmi (20,000 km; 13,000 mi) at 10 kn (19 km/h; 12 mph) surfaced, 8,000 nmi (15,000 km; 9,200 mi) at 10 kn (19 km/h; 12 mph) snorkeling, 400 nmi (740 km; 460 mi) at 4 kn (7.4 km/h; 4.6 mph), submerged
- Endurance: 50 days
- Test depth: 500 m (1,600 ft)
- Complement: 40 crew
- Sensors & processing systems: Kongsberg MSI-90U Mk 2 combat management system; Atlas Elektronik CSU-90 active and passive sonar; Wärtsilä ELAC KaleidoScope sonar suite; Flank sonar arrays; Pegasso RESM system; Aries radar; ECPINS-W integrating navigation and tactical systems; L3's MAPPS integrated platform management system; Safran's Sigma 40XP inertial navigation systems; Hensoldt SERO 400 & OMS 100 periscope; ZOKA acoustic torpedo countermeasures
- Armament: 8 × 533 mm (21 in) torpedo tubes; 14 Black Shark torpedoes

KRI Alugoro (405) is a submarine of the Indonesian Navy. She is part of the improved Chang Bogo class, also known as the Nagapasa class. The vessel was assembled by PT PAL and was launched in April 2019. She is the first submarine to be assembled in Indonesia.

== Specifications ==
The diesel-electric Alugoro has a length of 61.2 metres (200 ft 9 in) with a beam of 6.25 metres (20 ft 6 in) and a hull draught of 5.5 metres (18 ft 1 in). She has a peak speed of 11 knots (20 km/h) when submerged and 21.5 knots (39.8 km/h) surfaced. The vessel is powered by 4 MTU 12V 493 diesel generators.

Submarines of the Nagapasa class also possess ZOKA acoustic torpedo countermeasures manufactured by Turkish company ASELSAN.

== Service history ==
The ship was ordered on 21 December 2011 as part of a US$1.07 billion contract between Indonesia and South Korea to provide three submarines, with Daewoo Shipbuilding & Marine Engineering being awarded the contract. As part of the deal, two of the submarines (Nagapasa and Ardadedali) were constructed in South Korea, while the third one was constructed in PT PAL's shipyard in Surabaya as part of a technology transfer program. Alugoro was the first submarine to be assembled and launched in Indonesia and Southeast Asia.

Prior to the original launching in October 2018, engineers discovered that the PT PAL Dockyard in Surabaya was too shallow for the submarine to be launched. Thus the Nagapasa was floated on a barge and relocated to Semarang Dock, within the same shipyard in Surabaya, about 350m away, but later returned the submarine to its original yard, where it was launched on 11 April 2019.

As of April 2019, Alugoro was scheduled to be commissioned later that year. However, the ship was officially delivered only in March 2021.

The name Alugoro - originating from a weapon name in wayang tradition - was previously assigned to a Whiskey-class submarine built by the Soviet Union which was used during the 1962 Operation Trikora.

Alugoro was reported to have participated in the search for the ill-fated submarine KRI Nanggala
