= ROKS Park Wi =

Submarine of the Republic of Korea Navy

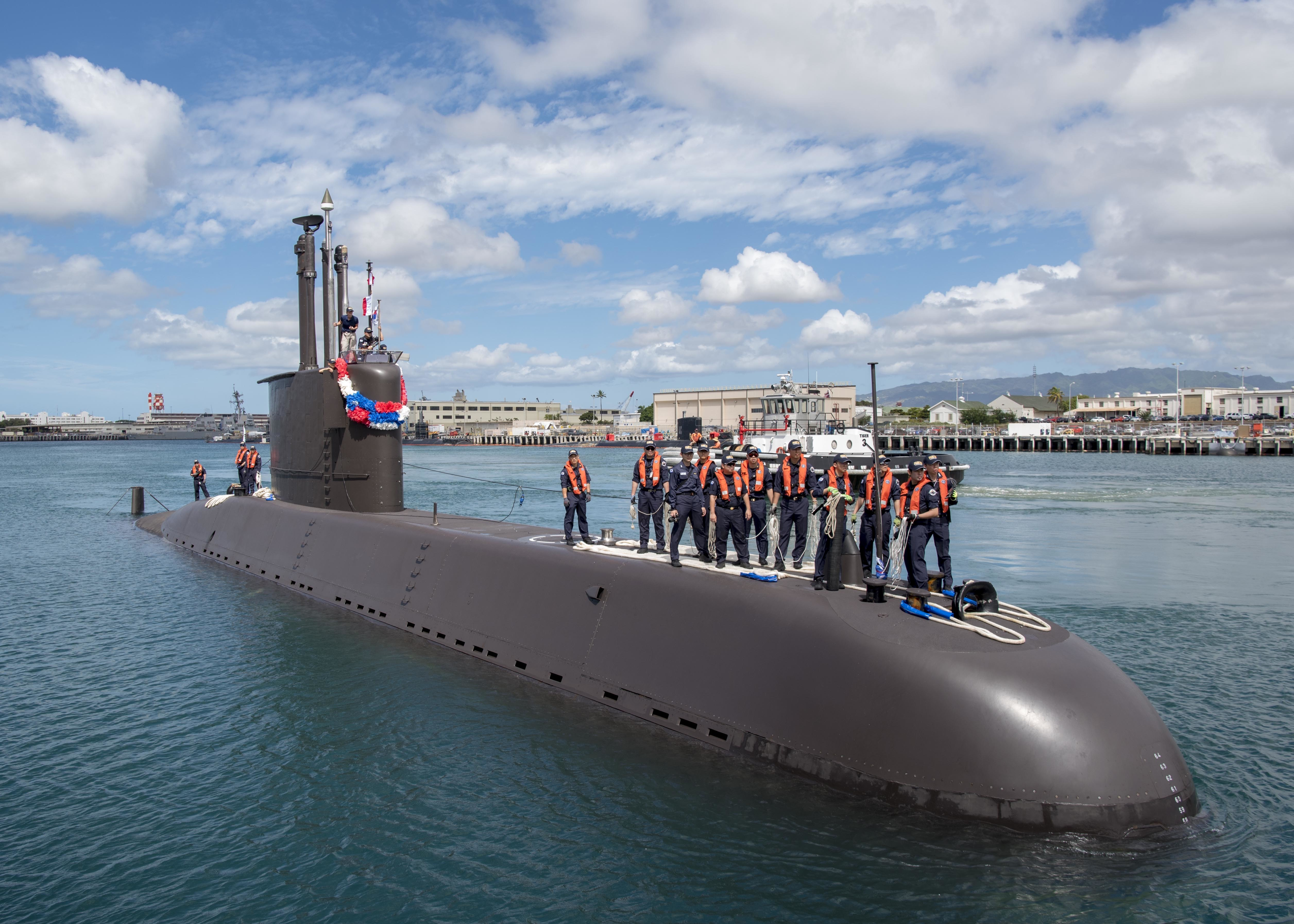
- ROKS Park Wi arriving in Pearl Harbor prior to RIMPAC 2018.

History

South Korea
- Name: Park Wi; (박위)
- Namesake: Park Wi
- Ordered: 12 August 1976
- Builder: DSME
- Launched: 21 May 1994
- Acquired: 30 August 1995
- Commissioned: 31 August 1995
- Identification: SS-065
- Status: Active

General characteristics
- Class & type: Jang Bogo-class submarine
- Displacement: 1,180 t surfaced; 1,285 t submerged
- Length: 55.9 m (183 ft 5 in)
- Beam: 6.4 m (21 ft 0 in)
- Draft: 5.9 m (19 ft 4 in)
- Propulsion: 4 MTU Type 12V493 AZ80 GA31L diesel engines; 1 Siemens electric motor; 1 shaft; 4,600 hp (3,400 kW)
- Speed: 11 knots (20 km/h) surfaced; 21 knots (39 km/h) submerged
- Range: 11,300 nmi (20,900 km) surfaced at 4 knots (7.4 km/h)
- Endurance: 50 days
- Complement: 5 officers, 26 enlisted
- Armament: 8 × 21 in (533 mm) torpedo tubes; 14 SST-4 torpedoes

ROKS Park Wi (SS-065) is the fourth ship of the Jang Bogo-class submarine of the Republic of Korea Navy, and was the third submarine to serve with the navy. She is one of Jang Bogo-class submarines to be built in South Korea.

== Development ==
At the end of the 1980s the South Korean navy started to improve its overall capability and began to operate more advanced vessels. South Korea purchased its first submarines, German U-209 class in its Type 1200 subvariant, ordered as the Jang Bogo class. These boats are generally similar to Turkey's six Atilay-class submarines, with German sensors and weapons.

The first order placed late in 1987 covered three boats, one to be completed in Germany and the other two in South Korea from German-supplied kits. There followed by two additional three-boat orders placed in October 1989 and January 1994 for boats of South Korean construction. The boats were commissioned from 1993 to 2001.

The older boats were upgraded, it is believed that the modernization included a hull stretch to the Type 1400 length, provision for tube-launched Harpoon missiles and the addition of a towed-array sonar.

== Construction and career ==
ROKS Park Wi was built and launched on 31 May 1994 by Daewoo Shipbuilding. She was acquired by the navy on 30 August 1995 and be commissioned 31 August 1995.

=== RIMPAC 2018 ===
ROKS Park Wi, ROKS Dae Jo-yeong and ROKS Yulgok Yi I participated in RIMPAC 2018. RIMPAC 2018 took place from June 27 to 2 August 2018.

== See also ==
- Type 209 submarine
