= KRI Ardadedali =

Submarine of the Indonesian Navy

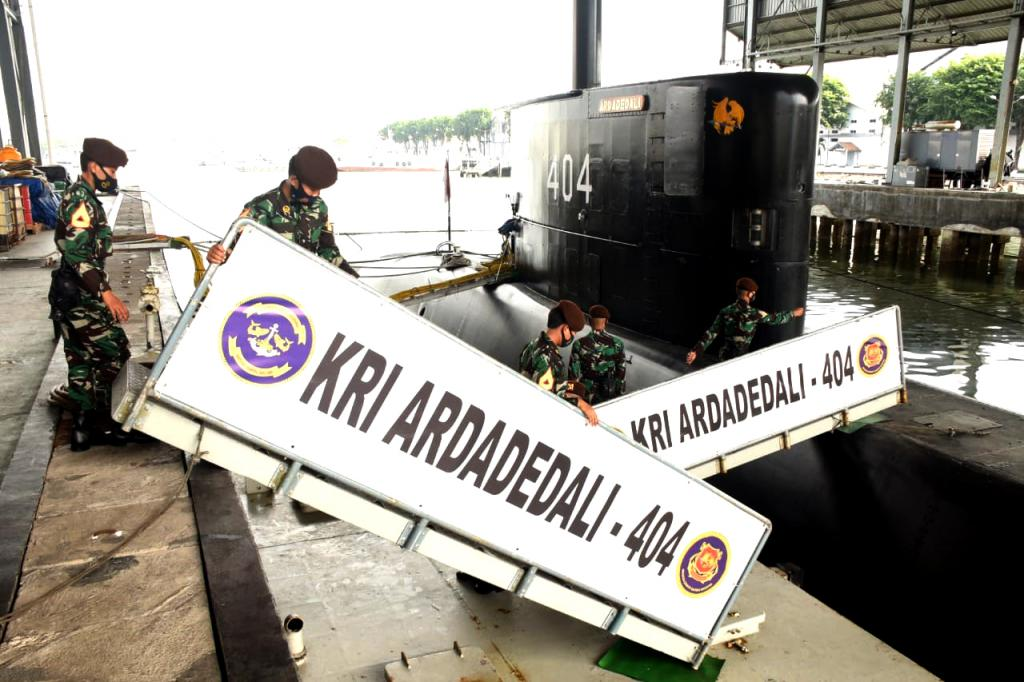
- Indonesian Naval Academy cadets toured Ardadedali in Surabaya, February 2021

History

Indonesia
- Name: KRI Ardadedali
- Namesake: Arjuna's arrow
- Ordered: 21 December 2011
- Awarded: Daewoo Shipbuilding & Marine Engineering
- Laid down: 2014
- Launched: 24 October 2016
- Commissioned: 25 April 2018
- Home port: Surabaya
- Identification: 404
- Status: Active

General characteristics
- Class & type: Nagapasa-class submarine
- Displacement: 1,400 tons
- Length: 61.3 m (201 ft 1 in)
- Beam: 6.3 m (20 ft 8 in)
- Draft: 5.5 m (18 ft 1 in)
- Propulsion: 4 x MTU 12V493 diesel generators; 3,700 kW (5,000 shp)
- Speed: 11 knots (20 km/h; 13 mph) surfaced; 21.5 knots (39.8 km/h; 24.7 mph) submerged
- Range: 11,000 nmi (20,000 km; 13,000 mi) at 10 kn (19 km/h; 12 mph) surfaced, 8,000 nmi (15,000 km; 9,200 mi) at 10 kn (19 km/h; 12 mph) snorkeling, 400 nmi (740 km; 460 mi) at 4 kn (7.4 km/h; 4.6 mph), submerged
- Endurance: 50 days
- Test depth: 500 m (1,600 ft)
- Complement: 40 crew
- Sensors & processing systems: Kongsberg MSI-90U Mk 2 combat management system; Atlas Elektronik CSU-90 active and passive sonar; Wärtsilä ELAC KaleidoScope sonar suite; Flank sonar arrays; Pegasso RESM system; Aries radar; ECPINS-W integrating navigation and tactical systems; L3's MAPPS integrated platform management system; Safran's Sigma 40XP inertial navigation systems; Hensoldt SERO 400 & OMS 100 periscope; ZOKA acoustic torpedo countermeasures
- Armament: 8 × 533 mm (21 in) torpedo tubes; 14 Black Shark torpedoes

KRI Ardadedali (404) is a submarine of the Indonesian Navy. She is part of the improved Chang Bogo class, also known as the Nagapasa class.

== Specifications ==
The diesel-electric Ardadedali, like other submarines in its class, has a length of 61.2 metres (200 ft 9 in) with a beam of 6.25 metres (20 ft 6 in) and a hull draught of 5.5 metres (18 ft 1 in). It has a peak speed of 21.5 knots (39.8 km/h) when submerged and 11 knots (20 km/h) surfaced. The vessel is powered by 4 MTU 12V 493 diesel generators. It carries a crew of up to 40, and is equipped with 533 mm torpedo tubes. Ardadedali has a maximum range of 18,520 kilometres (10,000 nmi). Submarines of the Nagapasa class also possess ZOKA acoustic torpedo countermeasures manufactured by the Turkish company ASELSAN.

== Service History ==
The ship was ordered on 21 December 2011 as part of a US$ 1.07 billion contract between Indonesia and South Korea to provide three submarines, with Daewoo Shipbuilding & Marine Engineering (DSME) being awarded the contract. As part of the deal, two of the submarines (Nagapasa and Ardadedali) were constructed in South Korea, while the third one (Alugoro) was constructed in PT PAL's shipyard in Surabaya as part of a technology transfer program. Ardedali's keel was laid in 2014 and she was launched on 24 October 2016.

Ardadedali was delivered and commissioned in a ceremony at DSME's shipyard in Okpo, Geoje on 25 April 2018, before sailing to its base in Surabaya. She was attached to the Indonesian Navy's 2nd Fleet Command, based in Surabaya. Her name Ardadedali was based on an arrow in the possession of Arjuna in the Mahabharata epic.
