= ROKS Choe Museon =

Submarine of the Republic of Korea Navy

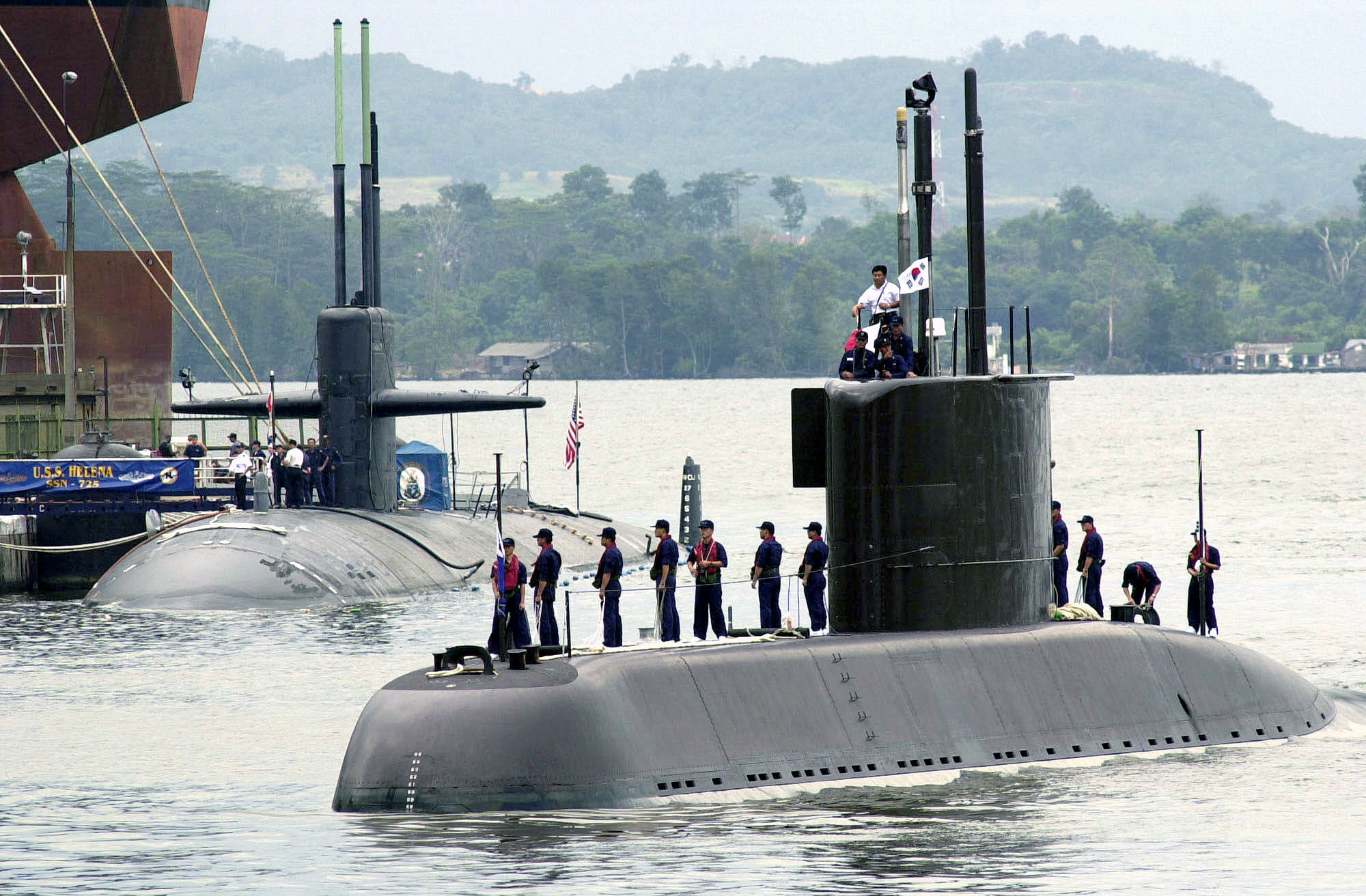
- ROKS Choe Museon passes by USS Helena into the Sembawang, Singapore in 2000.

History

South Korea
- Name: Choe Museon; (최무선)
- Namesake: Choe Museon
- Ordered: 12 August 1976
- Builder: DSME
- Launched: 7 August 1993
- Acquired: 27 February 1995
- Commissioned: 28 February 1995
- Identification: SS-063
- Status: Active

General characteristics
- Class & type: Jang Bogo-class submarine
- Displacement: 1,180 t surfaced; 1,285 t submerged
- Length: 55.9 m (183 ft 5 in)
- Beam: 6.4 m (21 ft 0 in)
- Draft: 5.9 m (19 ft 4 in)
- Propulsion: 4 MTU Type 12V493 AZ80 GA31L diesel engines; 1 Siemens electric motor; 1 shaft; 4,600 hp (3,400 kW)
- Speed: 11 knots (20 km/h) surfaced; 21 knots (39 km/h) submerged
- Range: 11,300 nmi (20,900 km) surfaced at 4 knots (7.4 km/h)
- Endurance: 50 days
- Complement: 5 officers, 26 enlisted
- Armament: 8 × 21 in (533 mm) torpedo tubes; 14 SST-4 torpedoes

ROKS Choe Museon (SS-063) is the third ship of the Jang Bogo-class submarine of the Republic of Korea Navy, and was the second submarine to serve with the navy. She is one of Jang Bogo-class submarines to be built in South Korea.

== Development ==
At the end of the 1980s the South Korean navy started to improve its overall capability and began to operate more advanced vessels. South Korea purchased its first submarines, German U-209 class in its Type 1200 subvariant, ordered as the Jang Bogo class. These boats are generally similar to Turkey's six Atilay-class submarines, with German sensors and weapons.

The first order placed late in 1987 covered three boats, one to be completed in Germany and the other two in South Korea from German-supplied kits. There followed by two additional three-boat orders placed in October 1989 and January 1994 for boats of South Korean construction. The boats were commissioned from 1993 to 2001.

The older boats were upgraded, it is believed that the modernization included a hull stretch to the Type 1400 length, provision for tube-launched Harpoon missiles and the addition of a towed-array sonar.

== Construction and career ==
ROKS Choe Museon was built and launched on 7 August 1993 by Daewoo Shipbuilding. She was acquired by the navy on 27 February 1995 and be commissioned 28 February 1995.

=== Exercise Pacific Reach 2000 ===
The Republic of Singapore Navy played host to navies from Japan, Republic of Korea and the United States in Exercise Pacific Reach 2000, which was the first multilateral submarine rescue exercise held in the Western Pacific region. ROKS Choe Museon was chosen to represent South Korea in the exercise and she arrived on October 2, 2000.

== See also ==
- Type 209 submarine
