= ROKS Jang Bogo =

Submarine of the Republic of Korea Navy

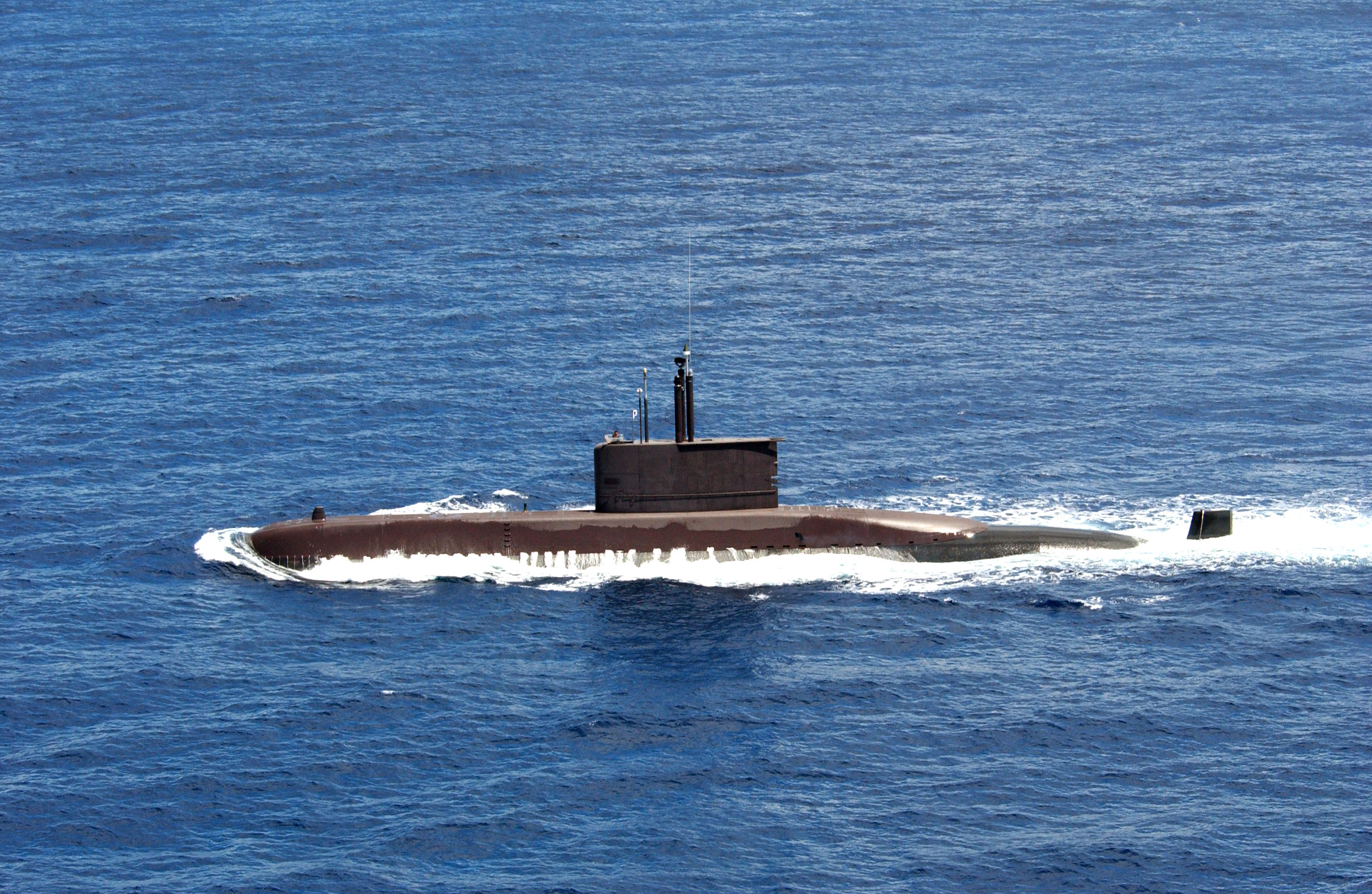
- ROKS Jang Bogo underway.

History

South Korea
- Name: Jang Bogo; (장보고)
- Namesake: Jang Bogo
- Ordered: 12 August 1976
- Builder: Howaldtswerke Deutsche Werft AG
- Laid down: 1987
- Launched: September 1991
- Commissioned: October 1992
- Identification: SS-061
- Status: Decommissioned

General characteristics
- Class & type: Jang Bogo-class submarine
- Displacement: 1,180 t surfaced; 1,285 t submerged
- Length: 55.9 m (183 ft 5 in)
- Beam: 6.4 m (21 ft 0 in)
- Draft: 5.9 m (19 ft 4 in)
- Propulsion: 4 MTU Type 12V493 AZ80 GA31L diesel engines; 1 Siemens electric motor; 1 shaft; 4,600 hp (3,400 kW)
- Speed: 11 knots (20 km/h) surfaced; 21 knots (39 km/h) submerged
- Range: 11,300 nmi (20,900 km) surfaced at 4 knots (7.4 km/h)
- Endurance: 50 days
- Complement: 5 officers, 26 enlisted
- Armament: 8 × 21 in (533 mm) torpedo tubes; 14 SST-4 torpedoes

ROKS Jang Bogo (SS-061) is the lead ship of the Jang Bogo-class submarine of the Republic of Korea Navy, and was the first submarine to serve with the navy. It is one of the Type 209 submarines built for export by Germany.

== Development ==
At the end of the 1980s the South Korean navy started to improve its overall capability and began to operate more advanced vessels. South Korea purchased its first submarines, the German U-209 class in its Type 1200 subvariant, ordered as the Jang Bogo class. These boats are generally similar to Turkey's six Atilay-class submarines, with German sensors and weapons.

The first order placed late in 1987 covered three boats, one to be completed in Germany and the other two in South Korea from German-supplied kits. There followed by two additional three-boat orders placed in October 1989 and January 1994 for boats of South Korean construction. The boats were commissioned from 1993 to 2001.

The older boats were upgraded, it is believed that the modernization included a hull stretch to the Type 1400 length, provision for tube-launched Harpoon missiles and the addition of a towed-array sonar.

ROKS Jang Bogo was slated to decommission at end of December 2025 after 34 years of service.

== See also ==
- Type 209 submarine
