= Jang Bogo-class submarine =

Submarine class

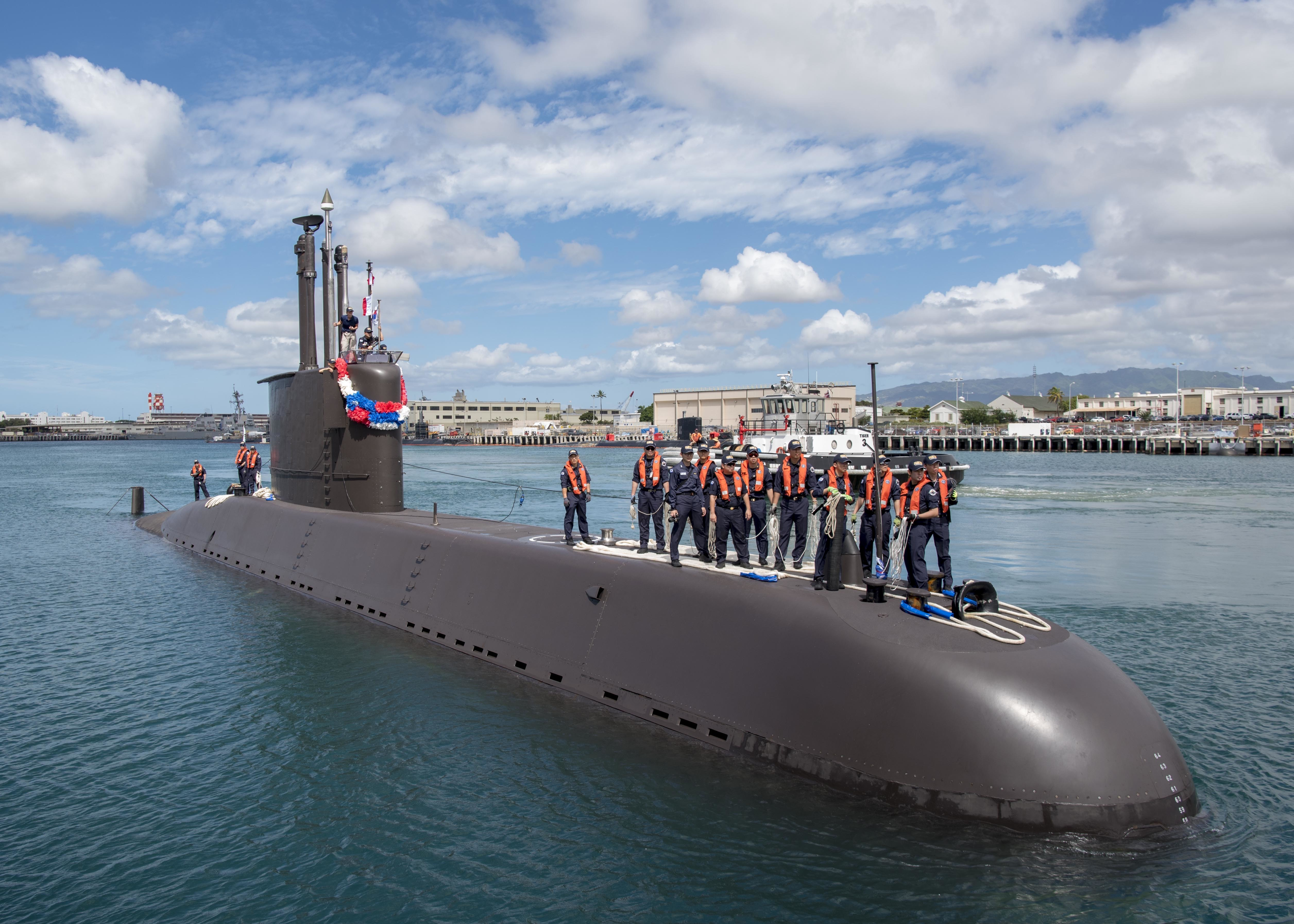
- Chang Bogo submarine docked at Pearl Harbor during RIMPAC 2018

Class overview
- Name: Jang Bogo class
- Builders: Howaldtswerke-Deutsche Werft; Daewoo Shipbuilding & Marine Engineering; PT PAL
- Operators: Republic of Korea Navy; Indonesian Navy
- Succeeded by: Type 214 submarine
- Subclasses: Nagapasa class
- Cost: $373M per vessel (Nagapasa-class Batch-1, 2011 April); $340M per vessel (Nagapasa-class Batch-2, 2019 December)
- In commission: 1993–present
- Planned: 15
- Completed: 12
- Active: 11
- Laid up: 1

General characteristics
- Displacement: 1200–1400 tons
- Length: 56 m (184 ft) (original); 61.3 m (201 ft) (stretched version Nagapasa-class)
- Beam: 6.3 m (21 ft)
- Draft: 5.5 m (18 ft)
- Propulsion: 4 MTU Type 8V396 SE diesel engines; 1 Siemens electric motor; 1 shaft; 5,000 shp (3,700 kW)
- Speed: 11 knots (20 km/h; 13 mph) surfaced; 21.5 knots (39.8 km/h; 24.7 mph) submerged
- Range: 11,000 nmi (20,000 km; 13,000 mi) at 10 kn (19 km/h; 12 mph) surfaced, 8,000 nmi (15,000 km; 9,200 mi) at 10 kn (19 km/h; 12 mph) snorkeling, 400 nmi (740 km; 460 mi) at 4 kn (7.4 km/h; 4.6 mph), submerged
- Endurance: 50 days
- Test depth: 500 m (1,600 ft)
- Complement: 33
- Armament: 8 × 21 in (533 mm) torpedo tubes; 14 SUT torpedoes; UGM-84 Harpoon anti-ship missile integration

The Jang Bogo-class submarine (Hangul: 장보고급 잠수함, Hanja: 張保皐級潛水艦) or KSS-I (Korean Submarine-I) is a variant of the Type 209 diesel-electric attack submarine initially developed by Howaldtswerke-Deutsche Werft (HDW) of Germany, intended for service with the South Korean Navy and Indonesian Navy. A Daewoo (DSME)-upgraded model of the Jang Bogo class Type 209 was exported by Korea to Indonesia in 2012, amid heavy competition from Russian, French, and German-Turkish consortiums including from Germany's original Type 209. The variant was considered for possible purchase by Thailand as well, as both newly built and second-hand options. The class is named for ancient Korean maritime figure Jang Bogo.

== Armaments ==
The Jang Bogo-class submarines are armed with eight bow 533 mm (21 in) torpedo tubes and fourteen torpedoes. The ships are also armed with Sub-Harpoon missiles and can be armed with 28 mines in place of torpedoes and Harpoon missiles. The class is armed with SUT - Surface and Underwater Target Torpedoes.

== Upgrades ==
The South Korean Jang Bogo-class submarines, originally based on Type 209/1200, had reportedly been heavily upgraded from a time early in the 21st century, which if properly undertaken was supposed to include domestic hull stretch augmentation from 1,200 tons to 1,400 tons, and installment of domestically developed Torpedo Acoustic Counter Measures (TACM). These upgrades could have been affected due to Korean economic problems of the late 1990s, which affected other plans to acquire nine 1,500-ton AIP-equipped boats or upgrade six 1200 boats to 1,500-tons AIP-equipped boats, although the more ambitious plan to acquire nine 1,800-ton Type 214 AIP submarines was preserved and put under progress, which will reportedly be wrapped up in 2018 when all submarines of the type are scheduled to be commissioned. Outfitting the submarines with Sub-Harpoon launching capability was a part of the upgrade, and this seems to have been properly carried out by 2002 on at least one submarine. By 2007, Na Daeyong and Lee Eokgi were demonstrated to have the capability. In the 2008 RIMPAC the submarine Lee Sunshin also demonstrated its sub-harpoon capability. By 2009 it was reported that nine South Korean-modified 1,400-ton Type 209 submarines were in service with the ROKN. As of 2011 they were reported to be 1,200-ton Type 209 submarines. They can equip the White Shark heavy torpedo, and can possibly equip submarine-launched Hae Sung anti-ship missiles later on. LIG Nex1 began producing TACM for unspecified submarine types of the ROKN as well, which finished development in 2000. AIP and flank-array sonars are planned for future modernizations. The Jang Bogo class offered to Indonesia will already be in stretched and augmented forms including guided missile-launching capabilities and a surface displacement of 1400 tons, quite similar to the original plan to upgrade the existing Jang Bogo-class submarines of ROKN to similar specifications.

A science documentary by EBS reported that Jang Bogo-class submarines will undergo major generational overhaul and refit every eight to twelve years. The overhaul and refit involves periodic cutting, complete disassembly, and re-welding of the hull for the upgrade or total replacement of the submarine's old engines, navigational equipment, batteries, and other essential equipment with their modern counterparts. Hull stretch may also have taken place in some of the Jang Bogo-class vessels since the early 2000s, but it has neither been completely confirmed nor denied. Some Jang Bogo-class vessels are demonstrated to have sub-Harpoon launching capability when previously the class was lacking it. ROKN is committed to build and maintain a submarine force of 26 attack submarines until 2025, excluding small and midget submarines, though it is not clear how many submarines among those will belong to the Jang Bogo class. The oldest commissioned Jang Bogo-class submarine by then will be 32 years old.

Lithium-ion battery power stacks are being developed to increase the underwater endurance of Jang Bogo-class submarines by two to three times, offering four to five times the power density of Type 209's current lead-acid batteries and as much as twice the power density of Type 214's BZM 120 fuel cells.

== Operational history ==
ROKS Park Wi virtually sunk 10 ships during Key Note-4 1997 exercise.

ROKS Lee Jongmoo virtually sunk 13 ships (150,000 tons) including a nuclear submarine, and was the only submarine that survived until the end of exercise during RIMPAC 1998.

ROKS Lee Chun sunk USS Oklahoma City (CL-91) with single torpedo during SINKEX, Tandem Thrust 1999.

ROKS Park Wi virtually sunk 11 ships (96,000 tons) and was never detected during RIMPAC 2000.

ROKS Na Dae-yong virtually sunk 10 ships (100,000 tons) during RIMPAC 2002.

ROKS Jang Bogo virtually fired 40 torpedoes, sinking 15 ships including USS John C. Stennis, and was never detected during RIMPAC 2004.

== Sales ==
In December 2011, DSME won a contract to build 3 1,400-ton Chang Bogo-class submarines for Indonesia at a cost of $1.07 billion. Construction of the submarines will start in January 2012 for delivery by 2015 and 2016, for commissioning in the first half of 2018. They'll be equipped with torpedoes and guided missiles. The submarines are described to be Korea's original model, bigger and more advanced than Indonesia's refurbished Type 209/1300. Initially the offered submarines were going to be in-service ROKN submarines. The sale will be done without the involvement of German companies. South Korea is currently the only country outside Germany independently offering the Type 209 for sale. Indonesia was also offered two license built Type 209 submarines manufactured by a group of Turkish (SSM - Undersecretariat for Defense Industries) and German companies (HDW/ThyssenKrupp), a deal reported to be valued at $1 billion. SSM was also offering the leases of Type 209 submarines until new submarines could be completed. The offer has since been superseded by the DSME submarine contract. In early 2012, the Korean defense firm LIG Nex1 exhibited its latest suite of indigenously developed submarine sensors, submarine combat systems, and heavy-weight torpedoes and wire-guided torpedoes in Indonesia for potential use by the Indonesian Navy's submarine forces.

== Improved Jang Bogo class ==
In 2011, DSME signed a contract with Indonesia on for the supply of three Improved Jang Bogo-class submarines. These submarines will be equipped with Atlas Elektronik CSU 90 hull-mounted passive and active search-and-attack sonar and flank sonar arrays, Indra's Pegaso RESM system and Aries low-probability of intercept radar, L3's MAPPS integrated platform management systems and Safran's Sigma 40XP inertial navigation systems.

The improved submarines are also known as Nagapasa-class submarines.

In 2019, South Korea signed another contract worth US$1.02 billion to sell three 1,400-ton submarines to Indonesia and would be supported through a loan agreement.

== Incidents ==
On July 15, 2020 05:00 UTC, the Norwegian merchant ship Hoegh London (IMO 9342205) collided with an unknown South Korean Jang Bogo-class submarine near Gadeokdo Island, Busan, South Korea.

== Boats in class ==
Country	Type	Pennant	Name	Commissioned
South Korea	Jang Bogo class	SS-061	Jang Bogo	1993
South Korea	Jang Bogo class	SS-062	Lee Chun	1994
South Korea	Jang Bogo class	SS-063	Choe Museon	1995
South Korea	Jang Bogo class	SS-065	Park Wi	1996
South Korea	Jang Bogo class	SS-066	Lee Jongmoo	1997
South Korea	Jang Bogo class	SS-067	Jung Woon	1998
South Korea	Jang Bogo class	SS-068	Yi Sun-sin	2000
South Korea	Jang Bogo class	SS-069	Na Dae-yong	2000
South Korea	Jang Bogo class	SS-071	Yi Eokgi	2001
Indonesia	Nagapasa class	403	Nagapasa	2017
Indonesia	Nagapasa class	404	Ardadedali	2018
Indonesia	Nagapasa class	405	Alugoro	2021

== Pictures ==
Jang Bogo-class Gallery

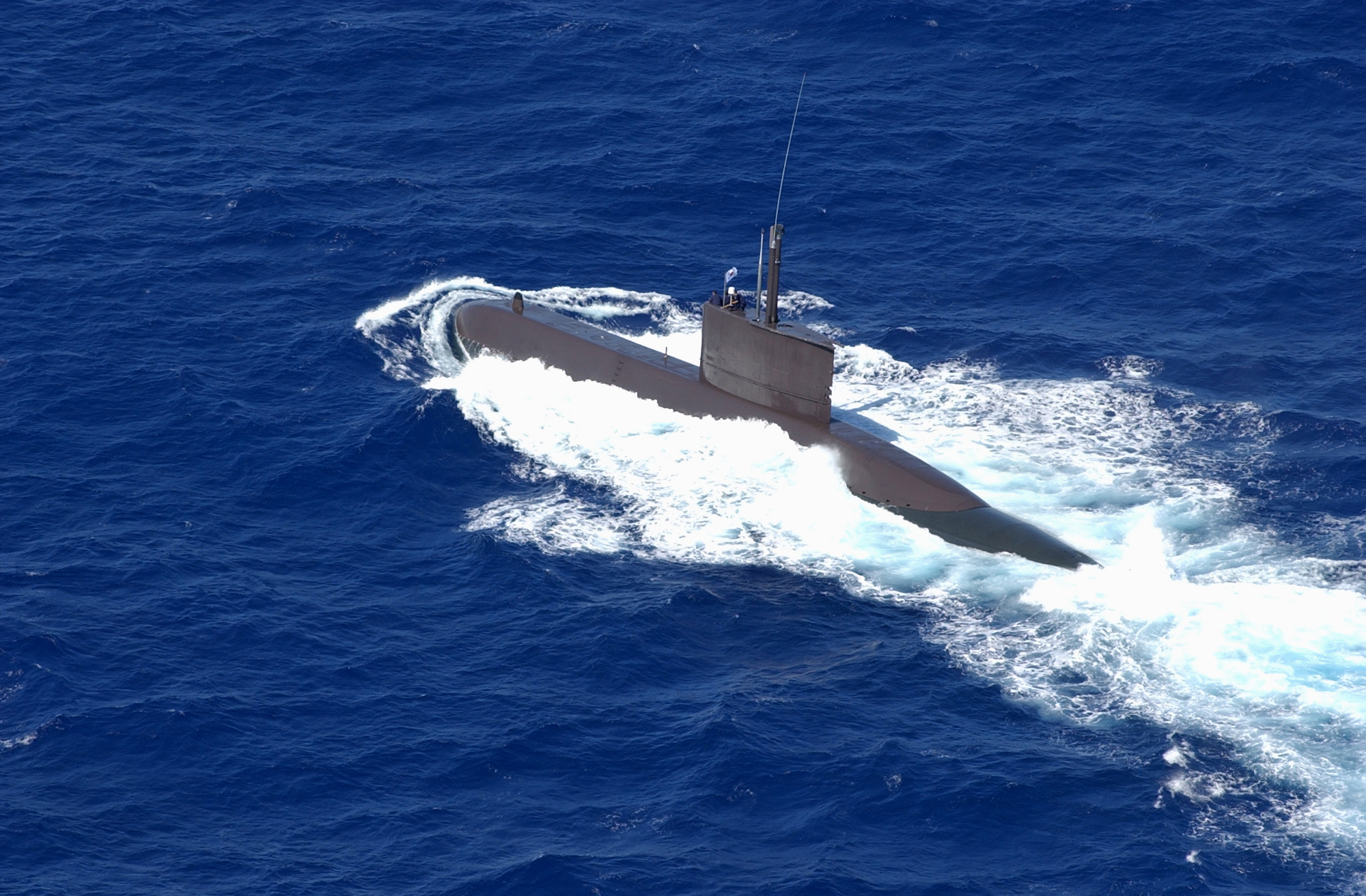
Republic of Korea (ROK) Chang Bogo Type 209/1200 submarine Nadaeyong (SS 069) surfacing during a SINKEX for Rim of the Pacific RIMPAC 2002.

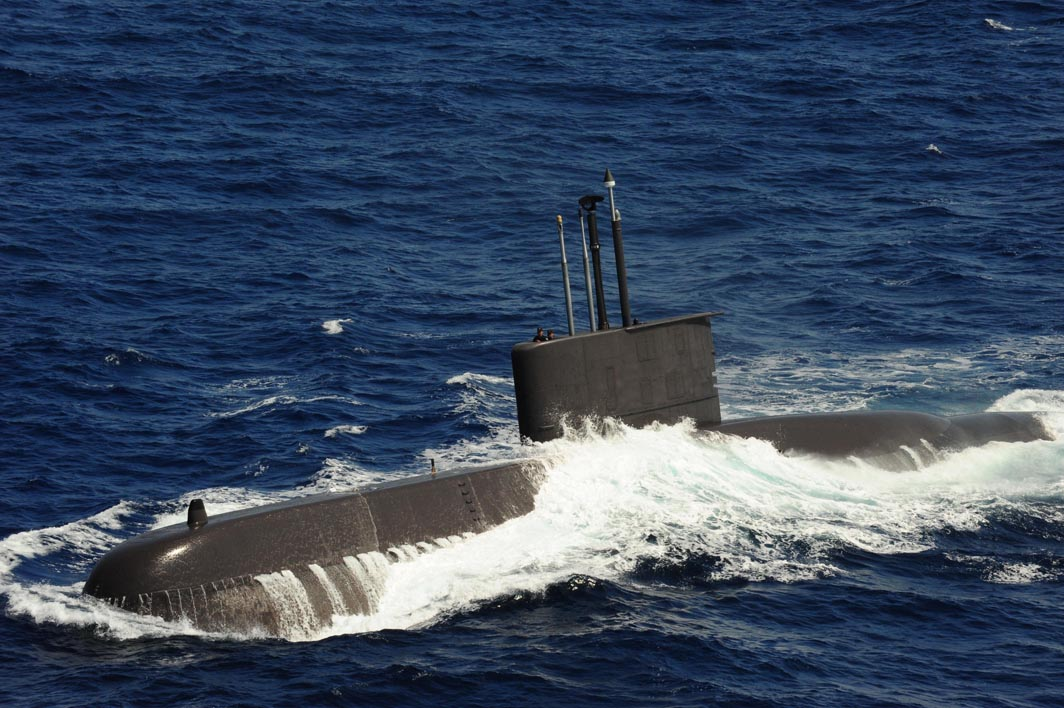
The Republic of Korea submarine ROKS Lee Eokgi (SS 071) leads a formation of U.S. and coalition forces during Rim of the Pacific (RIMPAC) 2010 exercises.

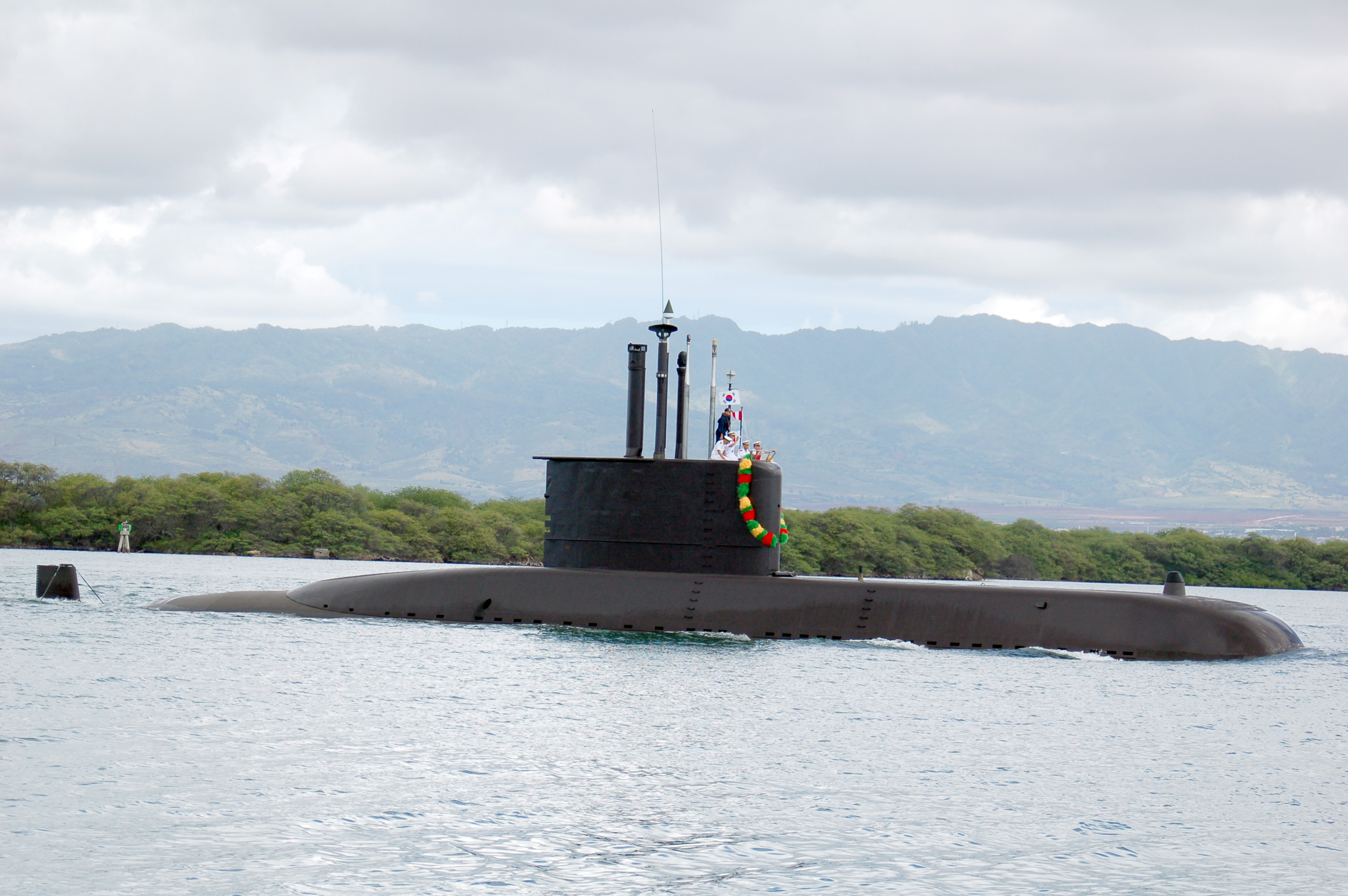
The Korean submarine Lee Sunsin (SSK 068) arrives at Naval Station Pearl Harbor, becoming the first foreign vessel to arrive to take part in the Rim of the Pacific (RIMPAC) Exercise.

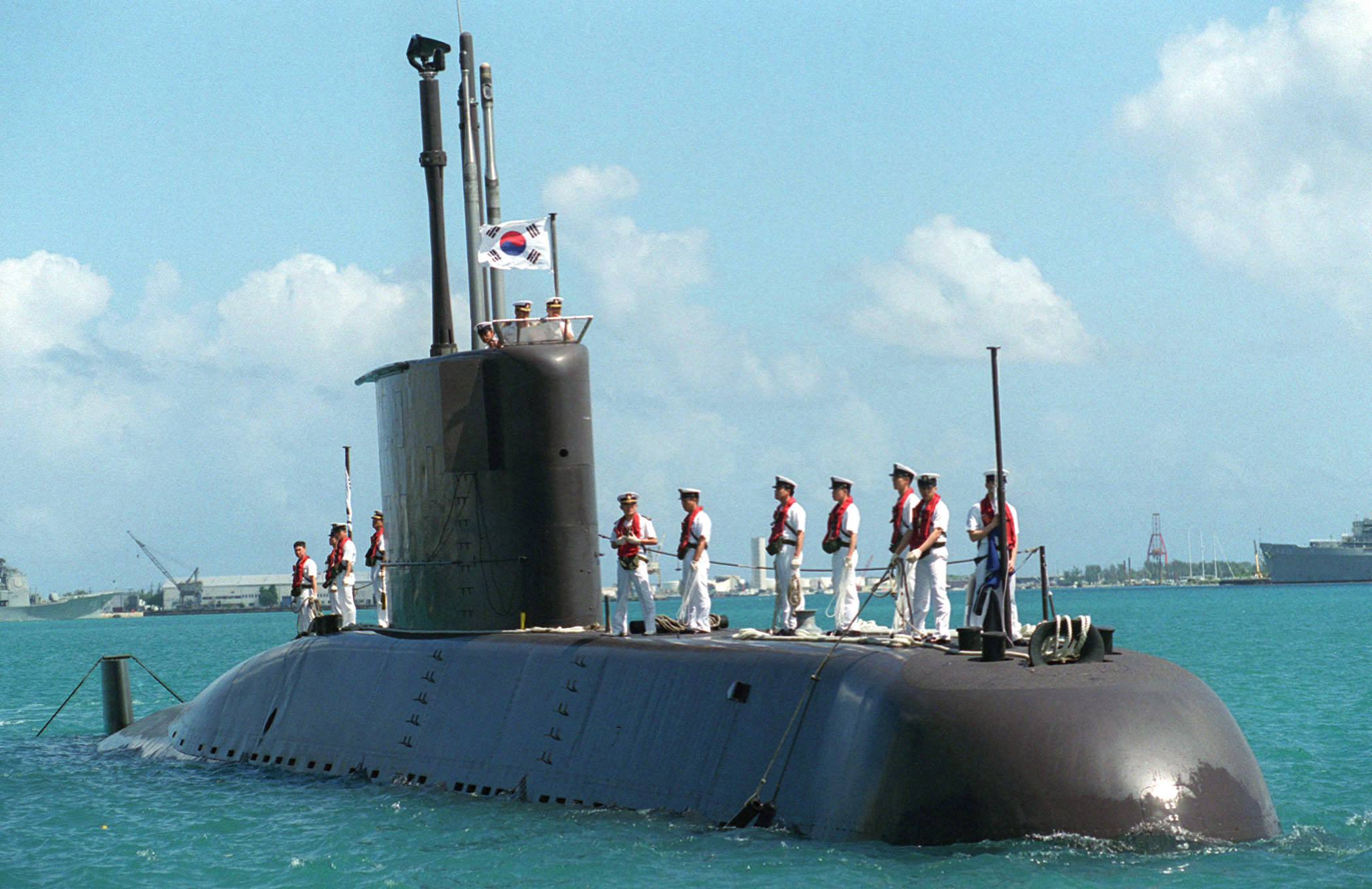
Sailors on board the Korean submarine Lee Chun stand at the ready, as they prepare to go pier-side in Apra Harbor, Guam. The Koreans are joining by other allied forces in Guam to participate in Exercise TANDEM THRUST '99.

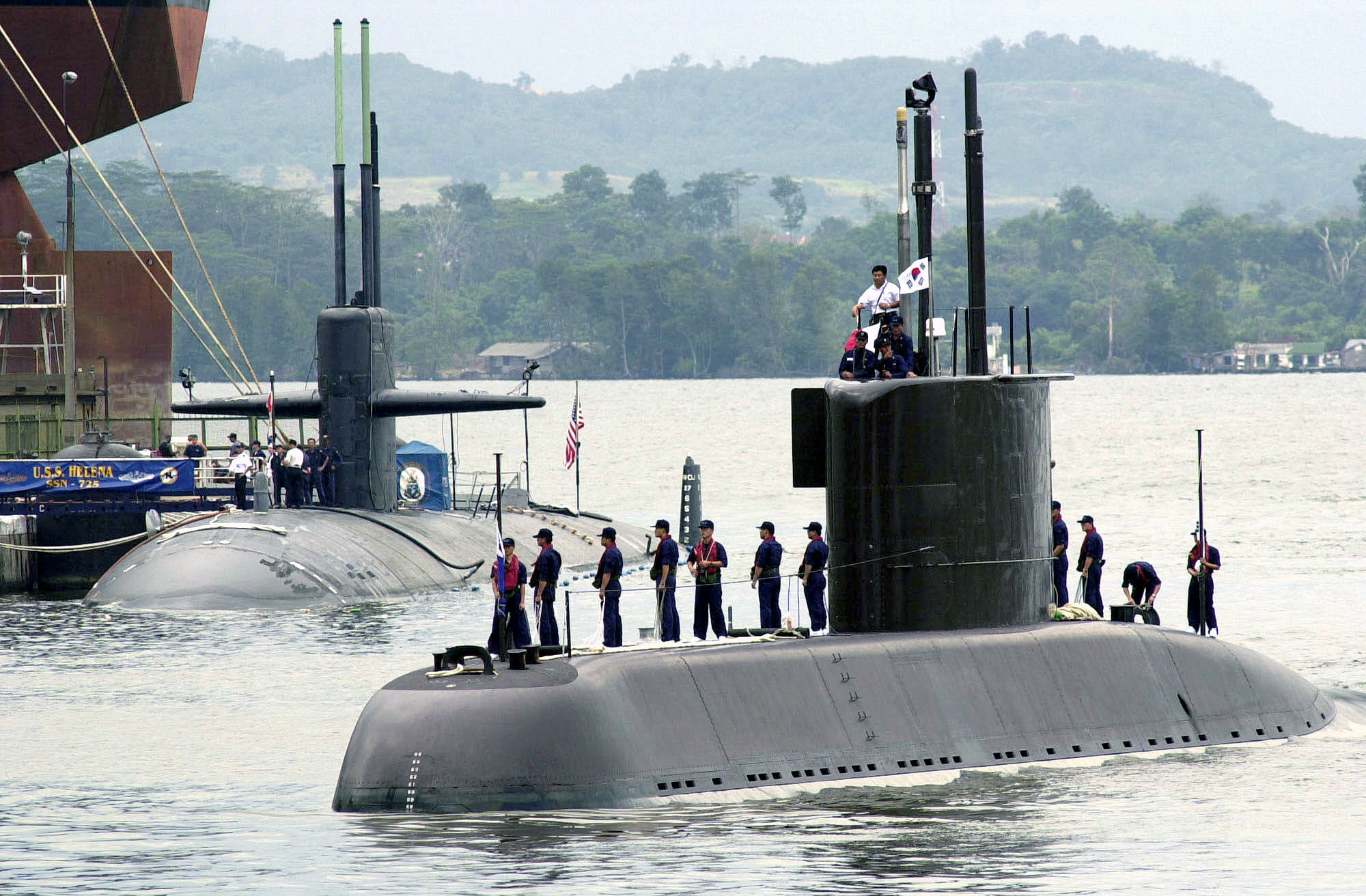
The Korean submarine Choi Museon makes its way past the United States Navy's USS Helena (Los Angeles class) and into the Sembawang port facilities in Singapore during Exercise PACIFIC REACH 2000.

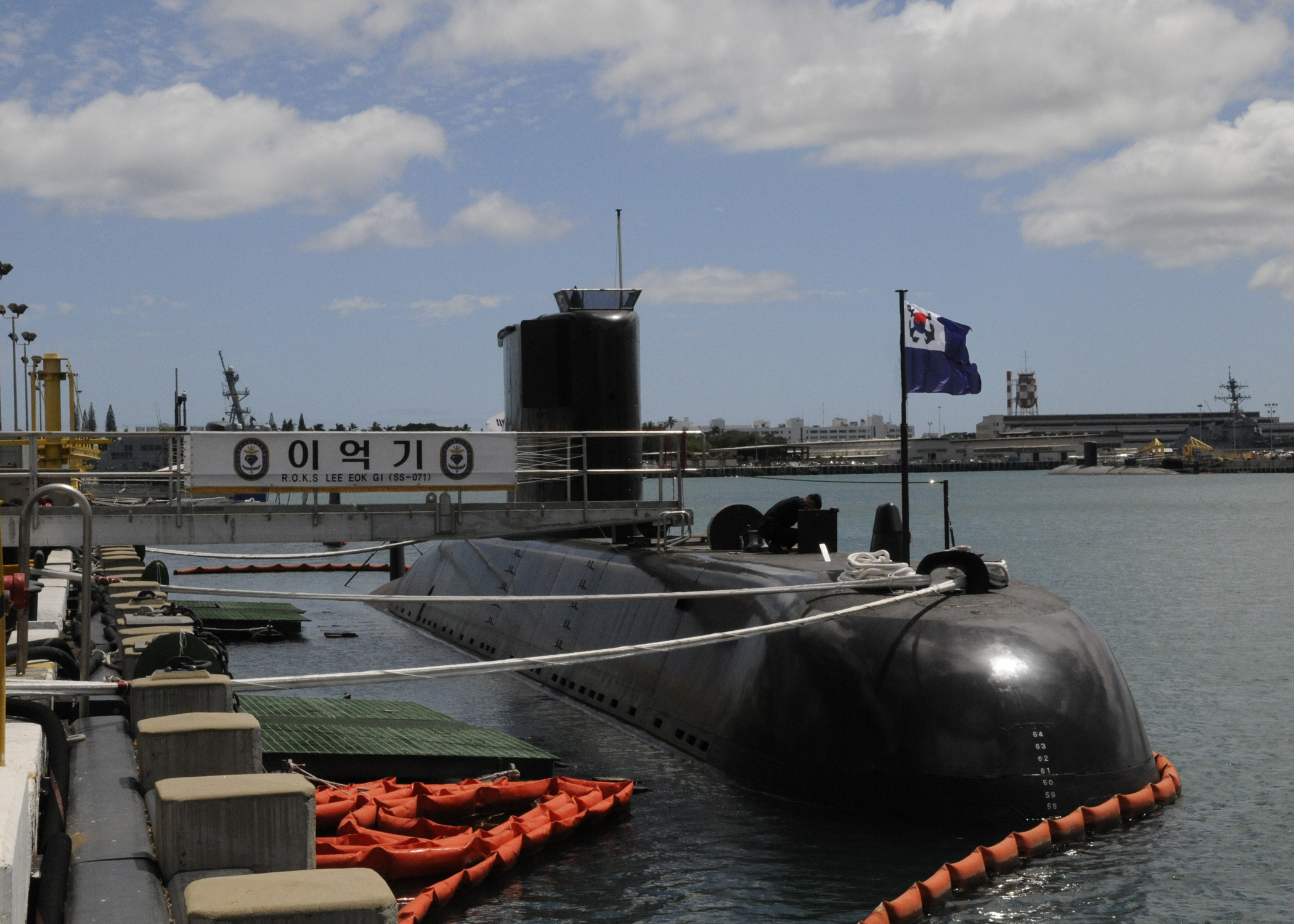
The Republic of Korea submarine Lee Eokgi (SS-071) prepares for Rim of the Pacific (RIMPAC) 2010 pierside at Joint Base Pearl Harbor-Hickam, Hawaii.

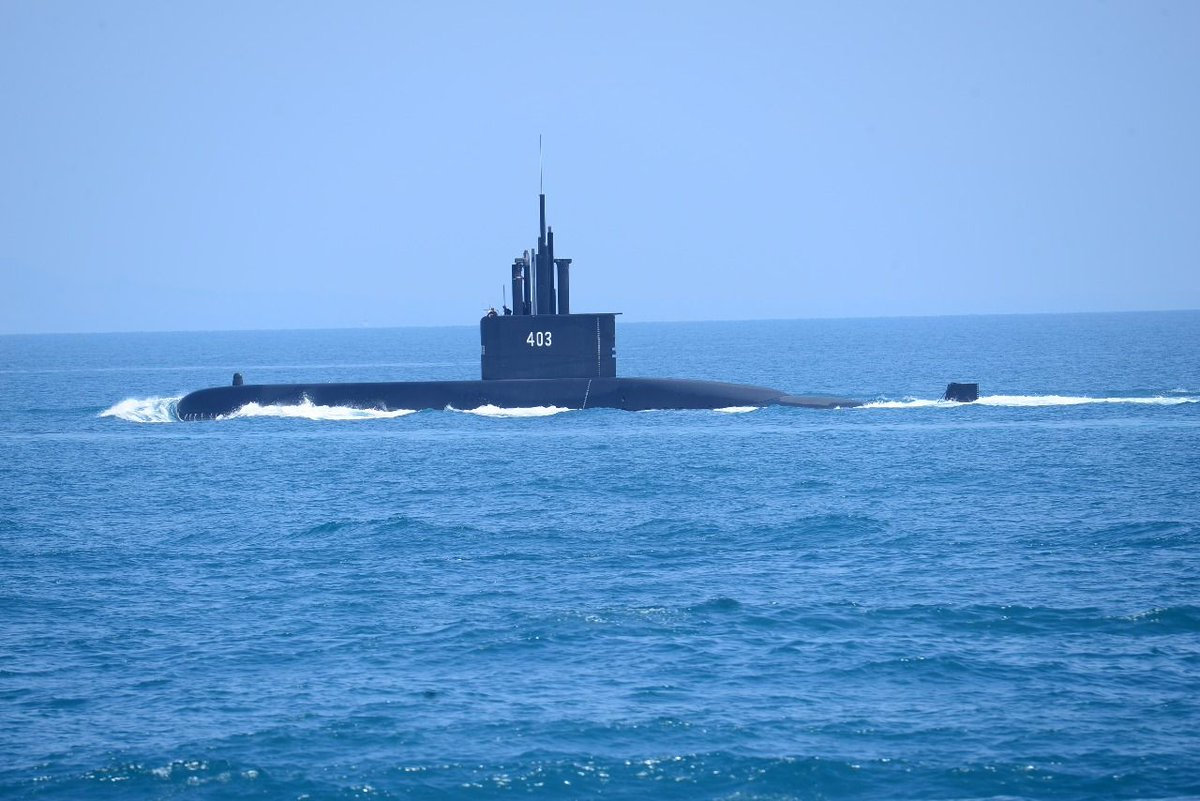
Indonesian Navy submarine KRI Nagapasa (403) during the annual armed force anniversary in Merak, Banten, 2017.

== See also ==
- List of submarine classes in service

Equivalent submarines of the same era

- Västergötland class
- Shishumar class
- Ula class
