= ROKS Jung Woon =

Submarine of the Republic of Korea Navy

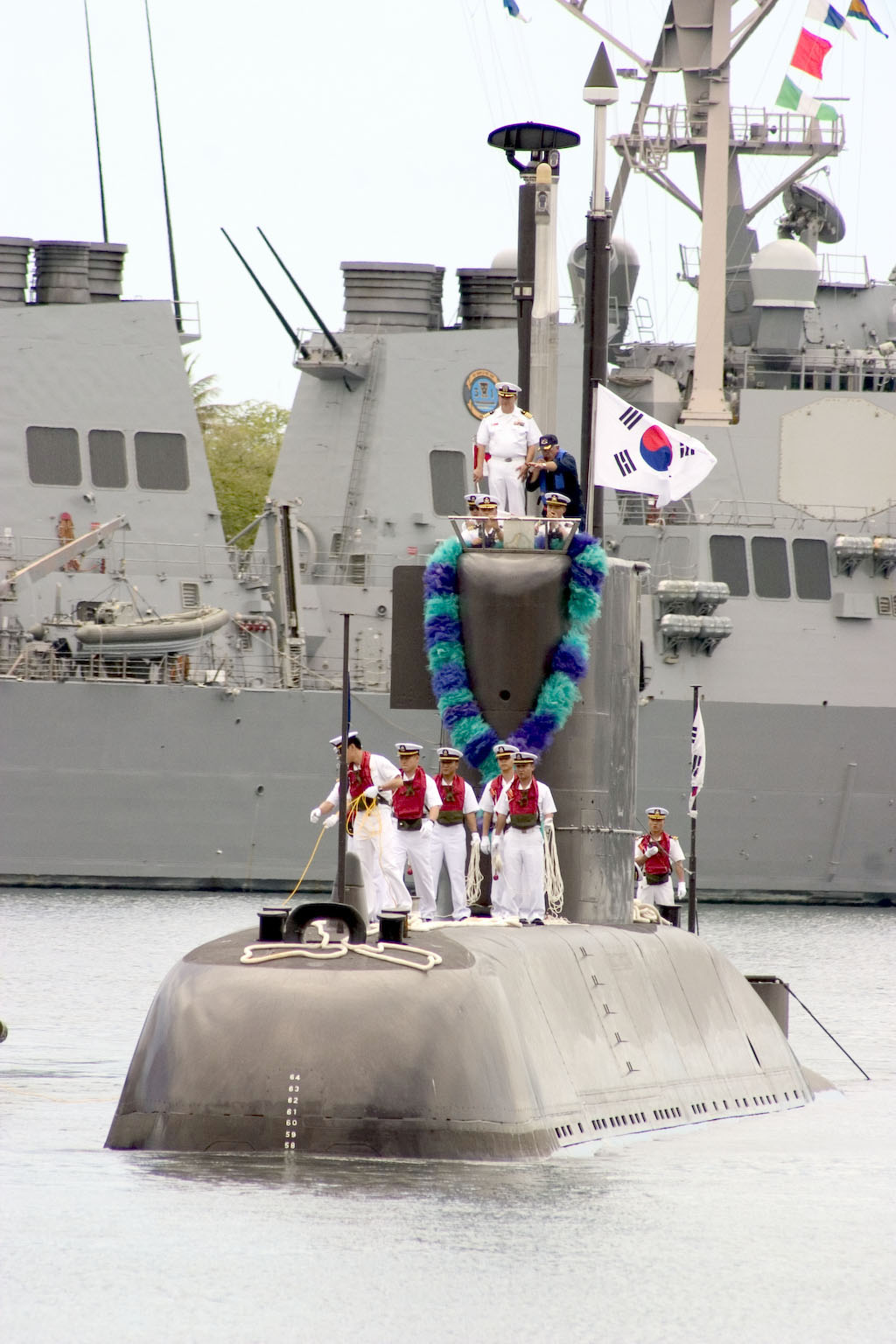
- ROKS Jung Woon at Pearl Harbor on 24 May 2006.

History

South Korea
- Name: Jung Woon; (정운)
- Namesake: Jung Woon
- Ordered: 12 August 1976
- Builder: DSME
- Launched: 7 May 1996
- Acquired: 29 August 1997
- Commissioned: 30 August 1997
- Identification: Pennant number: SS-067
- Status: Active

General characteristics
- Class & type: Jang Bogo-class submarine
- Displacement: 1,180 t (1,160 long tons) surfaced; 1,285 t (1,265 long tons) submerged
- Length: 55.9 m (183 ft 5 in)
- Beam: 6.4 m (21 ft 0 in)
- Draft: 5.9 m (19 ft 4 in)
- Propulsion: 4 MTU Type 12V493 AZ80 GA31L diesel engines; 1 Siemens electric motor; 1 shaft; 4,600 hp (3,400 kW)
- Speed: 11 knots (20 km/h; 13 mph) surfaced; 21 knots (39 km/h; 24 mph) submerged
- Range: 11,300 nmi (20,900 km; 13,000 mi) surfaced at 4 knots (7.4 km/h; 4.6 mph)
- Endurance: 50 days
- Complement: 5 officers, 26 enlisted
- Armament: 8 × 21 in (533 mm) torpedo tubes; 14 SST-4 torpedoes

ROKS Jung Woon (SS-067) is the sixth boat of the Jang Bogo-class submarine of the Republic of Korea Navy. She is one of Jang Bogo-class submarines to be built in South Korea.

== Development ==
At the end of the 1980s the South Korean navy started to improve its overall capability and began to operate more advanced vessels. South Korea purchased its first submarines, German U-209 class in its Type 1200 subvariant, ordered as the Jang Bogo class. These boats are generally similar to Turkey's six Atilay-class submarines, with German sensors and weapons.

The first order placed late in 1987 covered three boats, one to be completed in Germany and the other two in South Korea from German-supplied kits. There followed by two additional three-boat orders placed in October 1989 and January 1994 for boats of South Korean construction. The boats were commissioned from 1993 to 2001.

The older boats were upgraded, it is believed that the modernization included a hull stretch to the Type 1400 length, provision for tube-launched Harpoon missiles and the addition of a towed-array sonar.

== See also ==
- Type 209 submarine
