= Nagapasa-class submarine =

Submarine class

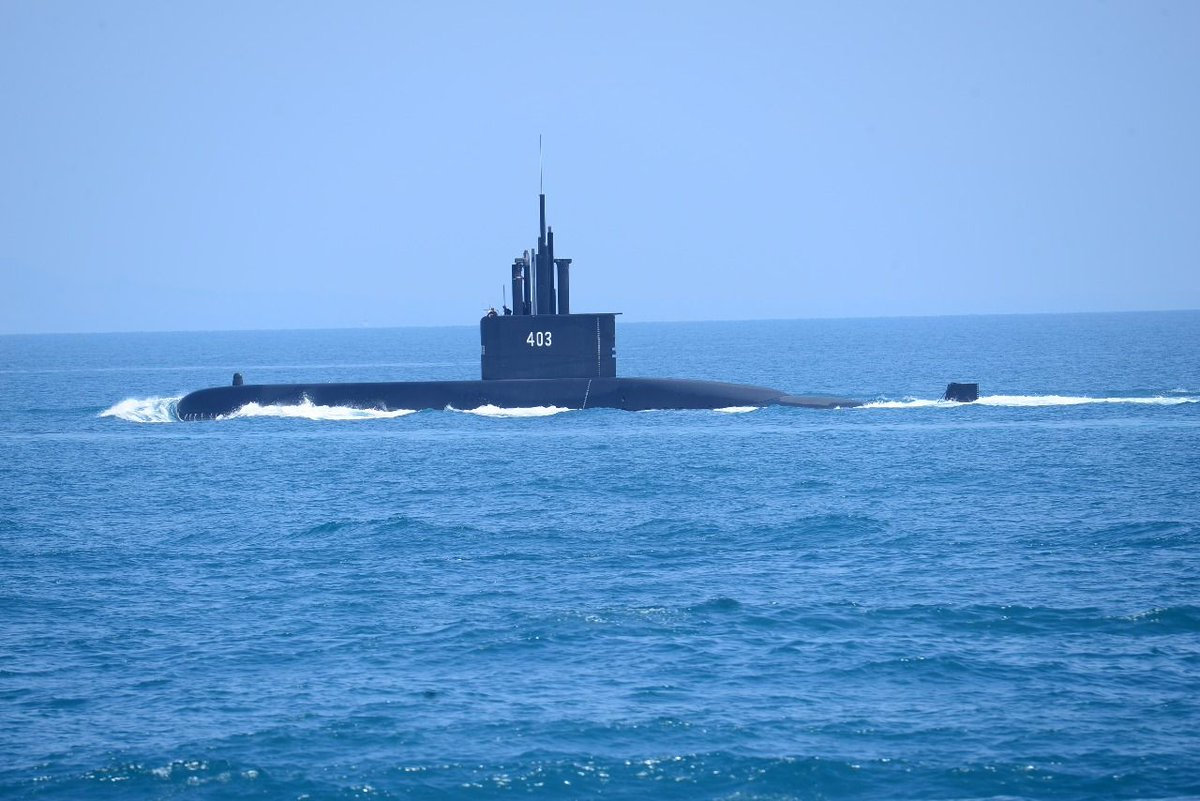
- KRI Nagapasa (403)

Class overview
- Name: Nagapasa class
- Builders: Daewoo Shipbuilding & Marine Engineering; PT PAL
- Operators: Indonesian Navy
- Preceded by: Cakra class
- Cost: $373M per vessel (Batch-1 Nagapasa-class, 2011 April); $340M per vessel (Batch-2 Nagapasa-class, 2019 December)
- In commission: 2017–present
- Planned: 6
- On order: 3
- Completed: 3
- Active: 3

General characteristics
- Type: Attack submarine
- Displacement: 1,400 tons (surfaced)
- Length: 61.3 m (201 ft 1 in)
- Beam: 6.3 m (20 ft 8 in)
- Draft: 5.5 m (18 ft 1 in)
- Propulsion: 4 x MTU 12V493 diesel generators; 3,700 kW (5,000 shp)
- Speed: 11 knots (20 km/h; 13 mph) surfaced; 21.5 knots (39.8 km/h; 24.7 mph) submerged
- Range: 11,000 nmi (20,000 km; 13,000 mi) at 10 kn (19 km/h; 12 mph) surfaced, 8,000 nmi (15,000 km; 9,200 mi) at 10 kn (19 km/h; 12 mph) snorkeling, 400 nmi (740 km; 460 mi) at 4 kn (7.4 km/h; 4.6 mph), submerged
- Endurance: 50 days
- Test depth: 500 m (1,600 ft)
- Complement: more than 40
- Sensors & processing systems: Kongsberg MSI-90U Mk 2 combat management system; Atlas Elektronik CSU-90 active and passive sonar; ELAC KaleidoScope sonar suite; Flank sonar arrays; Pegasso RESM system; Aries radar; ECPINS-W integrating navigation and tactical systems; L3's MAPPS integrated platform management system; Safran's Sigma 40XP inertial navigation systems; Hensoldt SERO 400 & OMS 100 periscope; ZOKA acoustic torpedo countermeasures
- Armament: 8 × 533 mm (21 in) torpedo tubes; 14 Black Shark torpedoes

The Nagapasa class is an upgraded variant of the Jang Bogo class, also known as Improved Chang Bogo. The vessels were built by the South Korean Daewoo Shipbuilding & Marine Engineering (DSME) and the Indonesian PT PAL. As of 2021, six ships have been planned, which were divided into two batches. Batch 1 consists of three ships and all are already commissioned. Batch 2 also consists of three ships that are in the early development stage. The class is named for weapon of Indrajit, Nagapash (Sanskrit: नागपाश, romanized: nāgapāśa, lit. 'serpent rope').

== Development ==
In December 2011, DSME won a contract to build three 1,400-ton Chang Bogo-class submarines for Indonesia at a cost of $1.07 billion. Construction of the submarines started in January 2012 for delivery by 2015 and 2016, and for commissioning in the first half of 2018. They are equipped with torpedoes and guided missiles. The submarines were described to be Korea's original model, bigger and more advanced than Indonesia's refurbished Type 209/1300. Initially the offered submarines were going to be in-service Republic of Korea Navy submarines. The sale will be done without the involvement of German companies. South Korea was the only country outside Germany independently offering the Type 209 submarine for sale. Indonesia was also offered two license-built Type 209 submarines manufactured by a group of Turkish (SSM - Undersecretariat for Defense Industries) and German companies (HDW/ThyssenKrupp), a deal reported to be valued at $1 billion. SSM was also offering the leases of Type 209 submarines until new submarines could be completed. The offer has since been superseded by the DSME submarine contract. In early 2012, the Korean defense firm LIG Nex1 exhibited its latest suite of indigenously developed submarine sensors, submarine combat systems, and heavy-weight torpedoes and wire-guided torpedoes in Indonesia for potential use by the Indonesian Navy's submarine forces. These submarines are equipped with Wartsila ELAC LOPAS Sonar and flank sonar arrays, Indra's Pegaso RESM system and Aries low-probability of intercept radar, L3's MAPPS integrated platform management systems and Safran's Sigma 40XP inertial navigation systems.

In 2019, South Korea signed another contract worth US$1.02 billion to sell three 1,400-ton submarines to Indonesia and would be supported through a loan agreement. However, the Indonesian government was reconsidering the contract as of April 2020.

== Operational history ==
KRI Nagapasa was commissioned by Indonesian Minister of Defense Ryamizard Ryacudu in South Korea on 2 August 2017. Afterwards, the submarine sailed to Surabaya, where she was received by Chief of Staff of the Navy Ade Supandi on 28 August 2017. Her name is based on the Nagapasha, a mythical weapon in the Ramayana. Nagapasa was then assigned to the Indonesian Navy Eastern Command (Koarmatim).

KRI Ardadedali was delivered and commissioned in a ceremony at DSME's shipyard in Okpo, Geoje on 25 April 2018, before sailing to its base in Surabaya. She was attached to the Indonesian Navy's 2nd Fleet Command, based in Surabaya. Her name Ardadedali was based on an arrow in possession of Arjuna in the Mahabharata epic.

KRI Alugoro was delivered to the navy on 17 March 2021 and commissioned in a ceremony at naval base in Ranai, Natuna Island on 6 April 2021. She was assigned to Navy's 2nd Fleet Command. Her name is based on the gada (mace)'s of Baladewa in the Mahabharata epic. Her name was previously used by a Whiskey-class submarine in 1960s, RI Alugoro (406).

== Boats in class ==
Name	Hull number	Builder	Ordered	Laid down	Launched	Commissioned	Status
Batch I
Nagapasa	403	DSME	21 December 2011	9 April 2015	24 March 2016	2 August 2017	In active service
Ardadedali	404	DSME	21 December 2011	2014	24 October 2016	25 April 2018	In active service
Alugoro	405	DSME, PT PAL	21 December 2011	2016	11 April 2019	6 April 2021	In active service

== See also ==
- List of active Indonesian Navy ships

Equivalent submarines of the same era

- U212 NFS
- Invincible class
- Kalvari class
- Reis class
