= USS Oklahoma City (CL-91) =

Light cruiser of the United States Navy

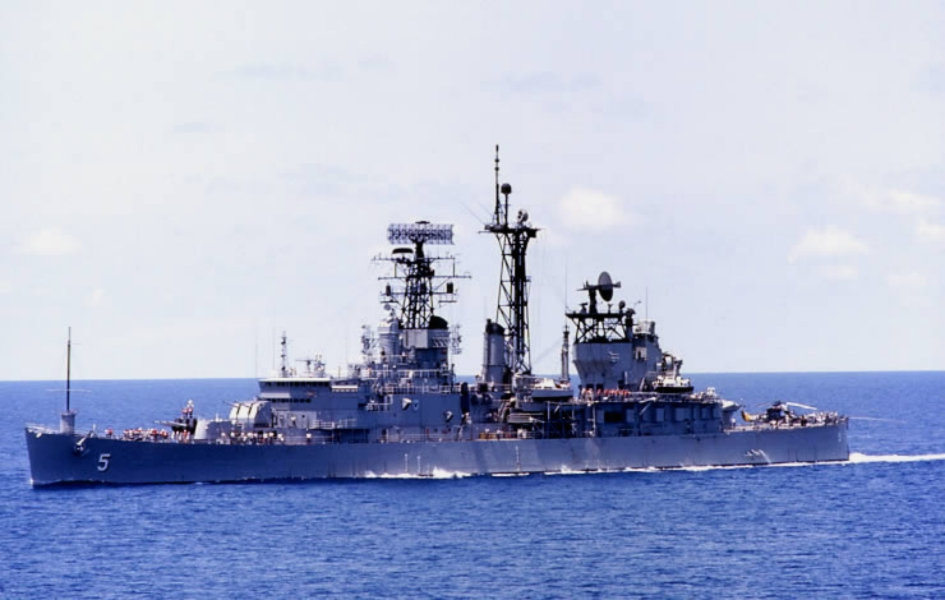
- USS Oklahoma City (CLG-5) in the Sea of Japan, August 1974.

History

United States
- Name: Oklahoma City
- Namesake: City of Oklahoma City, Oklahoma
- Builder: Cramp Shipbuilding Co., Philadelphia
- Yard number: 534
- Laid down: 8 December 1942
- Launched: 20 February 1944
- Sponsored by: Mrs. Anton H. Classen
- Commissioned: 22 December 1944
- Decommissioned: 30 June 1947
- Refit: 1957–1960
- Recommissioned: 7 September 1960
- Decommissioned: 15 December 1979
- Reclassified: CLG-5, 23 May 1957; CG-5, 1 July 1975
- Stricken: 15 December 1979
- Identification: Hull symbol:CL-91; Hull symbol:CLG-5; Hull symbol:CG-5; Code letters:NBWR
- Honors and awards: 2 × battle stars for World War II
- Fate: Sunk as target with a torpedo by Republic of Korea Submarine Lee Chun (SS 062) on 27 March 1999
- Badge

General characteristics (as built)
- Class & type: Cleveland-class Light cruiser
- Displacement: 11,744 long tons (11,932 t) (standard); 14,131 long tons (14,358 t) (max)
- Length: 610 ft 1 in (185.95 m) oa; 608 ft (185 m)pp
- Beam: 66 ft 4 in (20.22 m)
- Draft: 25 ft 6 in (7.77 m) (mean); 25 ft (7.6 m) (max)
- Installed power: 4 × 634 psi Steam boilers; 100,000 shp (75,000 kW)
- Propulsion: 4 × geared turbines; 4 × screws
- Speed: 32.5 kn (37.4 mph; 60.2 km/h)
- Range: 11,000 nmi (20,000 km) @ 15 kn (17 mph; 28 km/h)
- Complement: 1,255 officers and enlisted
- Armament: 4 × triple 6 in (150 mm)/47 caliber Mark 16 guns; 6 × dual 5 in (130 mm)/38 caliber anti-aircraft guns; 4 × quad 40 mm (1.6 in) Bofors anti-aircraft guns; 6 × dual 40 mm (1.6 in) Bofors anti-aircraft guns; 21 × single 20 mm (0.79 in) Oerlikon anti-aircraft cannons
- Armor: Belt: 3 1/2–5 in (89–127 mm); Deck: 2 in (51 mm); Barbettes: 6 in (150 mm); Turrets: 1 1/2–6 in (38–152 mm); Conning Tower: 2 1/4–5 in (57–127 mm)
- Aircraft carried: 4 × floatplanes
- Aviation facilities: 2 × stern catapults

General characteristics (1960 rebuild)
- Class & type: Galveston-class guided missile cruiser
- Complement: 1,426 officers and enlisted
- Armament: 1 × triple 6 in (150 mm)/47 caliber Mark 16 guns; 1 × dual 5 in (130 mm)/38 caliber anti-aircraft guns in Mark 32 mount; 1 × twin-rail Mark 7 Talos SAM launcher, 46 missiles
- Aircraft carried: Kaman SH-2B (1968–1972); Sea King (1975–) helicopter; (Call Sign: Blackbeard 1)

USS Oklahoma City (hull numbers: CL-91/CLG-5/CG-5) was one of 27 United States Navy Cleveland-class light cruisers completed during or shortly after World War II, and one of six to be converted to guided missile cruisers. She was the first US Navy ship to be named for Oklahoma City, Oklahoma. Commissioned in late 1944, she participated in the latter part of the Pacific War in anti-aircraft screening and shore bombardment roles, for which she earned two battle stars. She then served a brief stint with the occupation force. Like all but one of her sister ships, she was retired in the post-war defense cutbacks, becoming part of the Pacific Reserve Fleet in 1947.

In the late 1950s she was converted to a Galveston-class guided missile cruiser, which involved removing all her guns except for her forward 6-inch (152 mm) turret and 5-inch (127 mm) mount, and rebuilding her entire superstructure to accommodate the Talos missile system and flagship office spaces and accommodation. Like her three sister ships (Providence, Little Rock, and Springfield) of the Cleveland-class ships converted to missile ships, she was also extensively modified forward to become a flagship. This involved removal of most of her forward armament to allow for a greatly enlarged superstructure. She was recommissioned in 1960 as CLG-5 (and in 1975 redesignated CG-5).

In her second career she served extensively in the Pacific, playing a prominent role in the Vietnam War, including participation in the evacuation of Saigon. Oklahoma City was worked hard in shore bombardment duty during the war. As she was extensively well fitted with flagship accommodations and communications, there were plans for an extensive overhaul (of both her and Little Rock) starting in 1977. The ship would have received two 8-cell NATO Sea Sparrow surface-to-air missile (SAM) launchers and two Vulcan Phalanx CIWS systems, in addition to extensive rehabilitation of her propulsion systems, electrical systems, her hull and superstructure. This would have given her an additional 10 years of service life. While this work package was formally planned, and funding was appropriated, it was diverted elsewhere. She received enough maintenance to soldier on for a few more years and was decommissioned for the last time in December 1979. At the time of her decommissioning, she was the last Cleveland-class ship in service, and had served longer (a total of 21 years and 10 months) than any other ship of that class.

Oklahoma City was sunk by a torpedo fired from ROKS Lee Chun during SINKEX exercise, Tandem Thrust 99, on 26 March 1999.

== Construction and commissioning ==
Oklahoma City was laid down on 8 December 1942, by Cramp Shipbuilding of Philadelphia; launched on 20 February 1944, sponsored by Mrs. Anton H. Classen; and commissioned on 22 December 1944.

== Service history ==
=== World War II ===
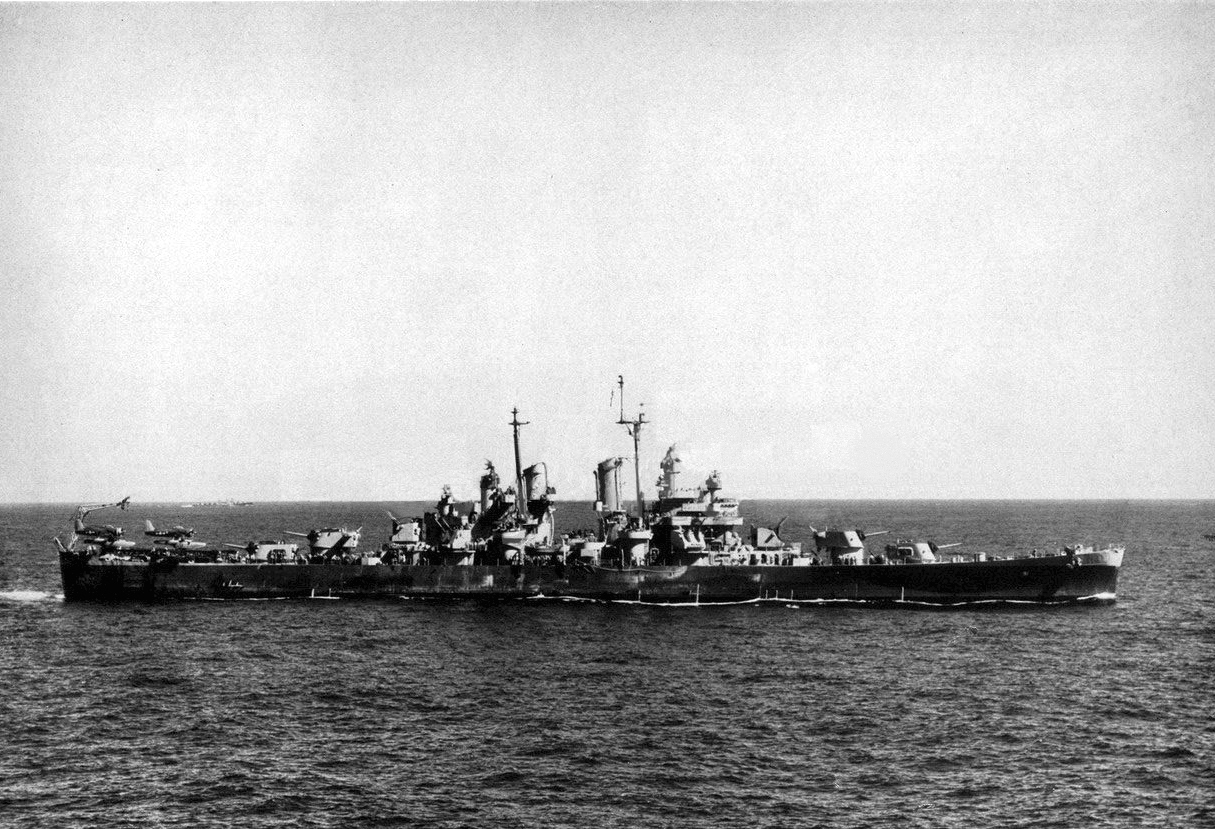
Oklahoma City during World War II.

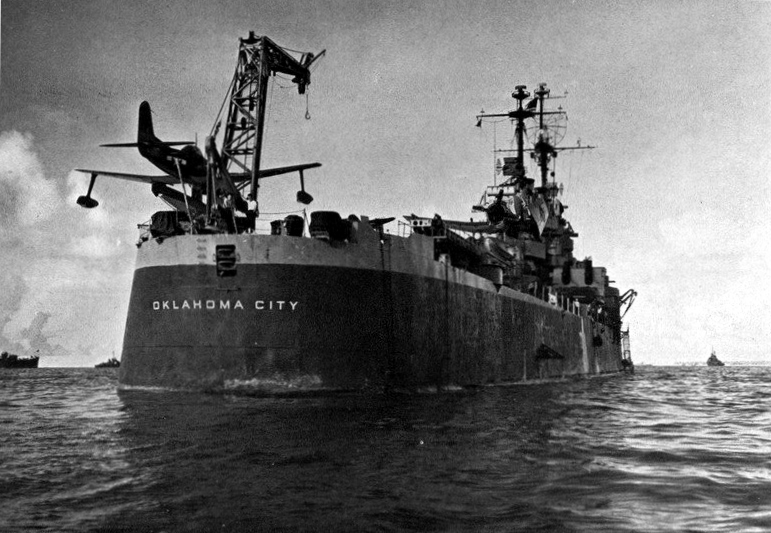
USS Oklahoma City (CL-91) stern with SC Seahawks c. 1945

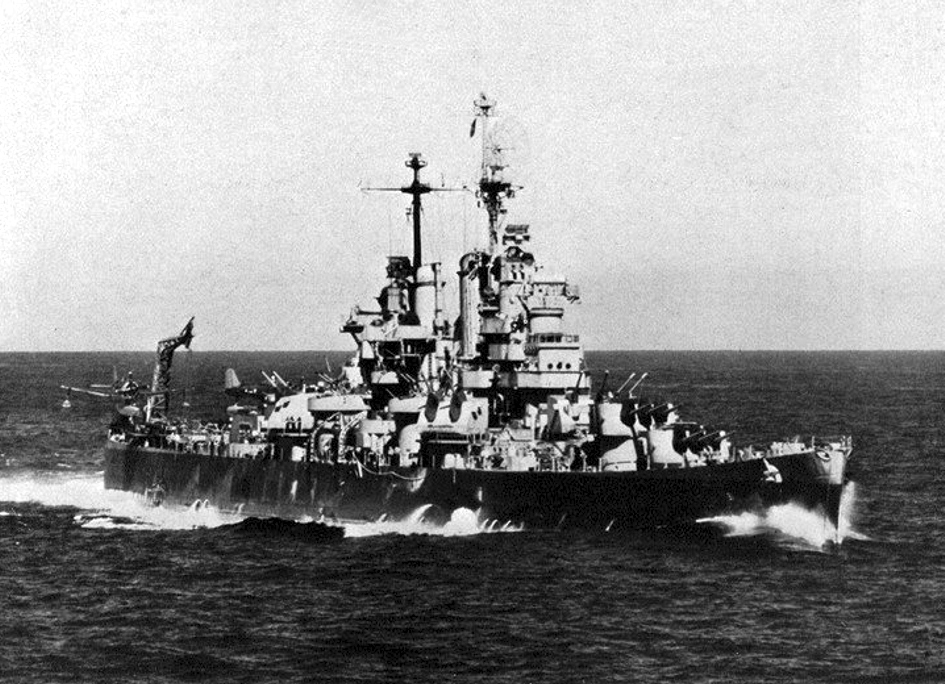
USS Oklahoma City (CL-91) at sea c. 1945

Following shakedown, Oklahoma City transited the Panama Canal and reported to Commander Cruisers Pacific Fleet (ComCruPac) for duty, arriving at Pearl Harbor on 2 May 1945. She conducted local operations until 22 May, when she sailed for Ulithi, thence to rendezvous on 6 June, with Carrier Task Group 38.1 for operations in support of the Okinawa campaign. For the rest of June, and into July, she screened 3rd Fleet carriers during their intensified air operations against Japanese forces. On 18 July, she formed a bombardment group with other cruisers and destroyers, then rejoined the carrier task group for continued action against the Japanese home islands. At the end of hostilities, she continued to patrol off the coast of Japan and it was not until 10 September, after seventy-two days of continuous steaming, that she finally entered Tokyo Bay. Oklahoma City remained on occupation duty until relieved on 30 January 1946, when she departed for the United States. She arrived at San Francisco on 14 February, where she remained until 15 August, when she entered the Mare Island Navy Yard for inactivation. On 30 June 1947, she was placed out of commission in reserve, assigned to the San Francisco Group, US Pacific Reserve Fleet.

=== Conversion to Galveston-class cruiser ===
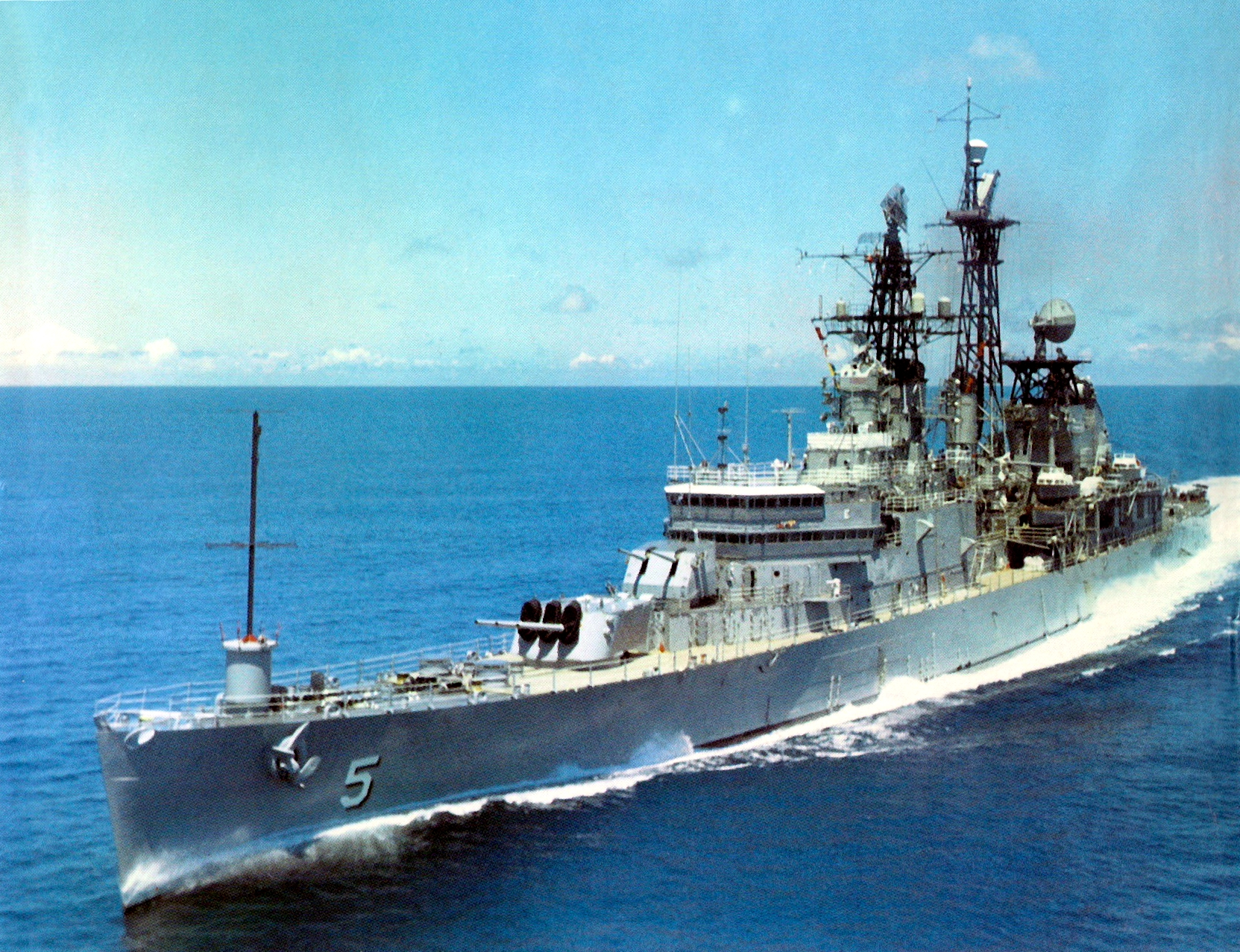
Oklahoma City in 1960.

On 7 March 1957, Oklahoma City arrived at the Bethlehem Steel Corp. Pacific Coast Yard, San Francisco, where conversion to a Galveston-class guided missile light cruiser commenced on 21 May, her hull classification and number being changed two days later to CLG-5. Her conversion having completed on 31 August 1960, she was towed to Hunter's Point where she recommissioned on 7 September.

During her shakedown training, Oklahoma City became the first combatant unit of the US Pacific Fleet to fire a Talos guided missile successfully. Following shakedown, she participated in several major training exercises while serving as flagship for Cruiser Division 3 (CruDiv 3) and Cruiser Destroyer Flotilla 9 (CruDesFlot 9), then departed 1 December, for a six-month deployment in WestPac. She arrived in Yokosuka, Japan, on 24 December, where, six days later, she became flagship for Commander, US 7th Fleet. The ship participated in SEATO training operations, received two awards for operational excellence, and served as an ambassador of good will to several cities in the Far East. She then returned to Long Beach, California, on 12 June 1962, and spent the next several months conducting local training operations and upkeep work. On 14 December, she entered the Long Beach Naval Shipyard for restricted availability followed by an extensive overhaul.

=== Vietnam ===
In early 1964, Oklahoma City began refresher training in Southern California waters to prepare for a lengthy deployment, then departed for Yokosuka where she arrived on 7 July, to assume her duties again as 7th Fleet flagship. Shortly thereafter, North Vietnamese gunboats attacked a US destroyer in the Tonkin Gulf and Oklahoma City quickly began a 25-day alert in the Gulf. Training exercises and operational visits to various ports in the Far East followed, then in June 1965, she began gunfire support missions off South Vietnam. When the level of hostilities increased, she began to spend more and more time in the South China Sea and eventually participated in operations "Piranha", "Double Eagle", "Deckhouse IV", and "Hastings II." After serving as 7th Fleet flagship for two and one-half years, Oklahoma City returned to San Francisco Bay Naval Shipyard on 15 December 1966, for an overhaul.

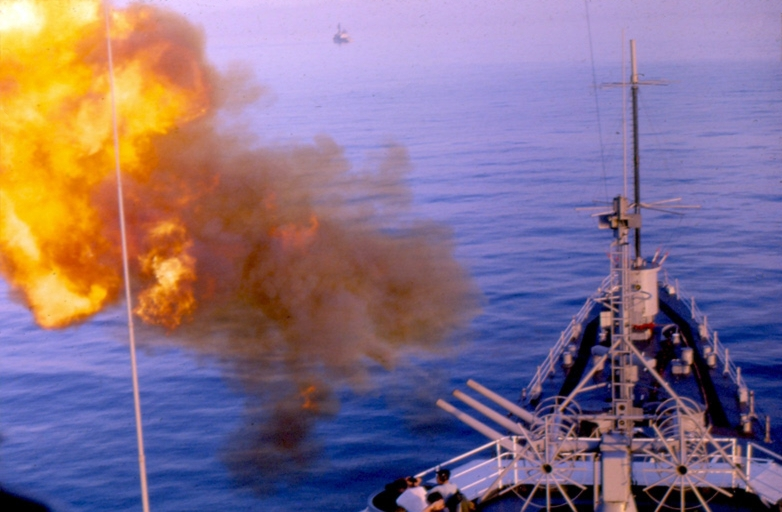
Performing fire support off Vietnam.

Following her yard period, she began refresher training in the Southern California operating area in July 1967, and continued those exercises and intermittent calls to West Coast ports until she deployed again to the Western Pacific (WestPac) 7 November 1968. She arrived at Yokosuka 20 December, and into August 1969, was again contributing to the strength of the 7th Fleet. The ship provided naval gunfire support for troops in South Vietnam, gunfire operations against coastal targets in North Vietnam and anti-aircraft operations in North Vietnam. In April 1969, Oklahoma City was sent to the Sea of Japan with three carrier groups after North Korea shot down an EC-121 spy plane.

As of 1 July 1969, Oklahoma City was under the administrative control of Commander Cruiser-Destroyer Force, US Pacific Fleet and Commander Cruiser-Destroyer Flotilla Nine. Both Commanders had their headquarters in San Diego, California. Oklahoma City was flagship and under the operational control of Commander Seventh Fleet. Also, while in the Western Pacific, Oklahoma City reported to Commander Cruiser-Destroyer Group Seventh Fleet for administrative purposes. As Flagship for Commander Seventh Fleet, Oklahoma City was designated flagship Group TG 70.1 with the Commanding Officer as Commander of the Group. Oklahoma City also served as a unit of TG 70.8.9 while providing gunfire support off the coast of Vietnam. The ship was homeported in Yokosuka, Japan, at the time.

Upon arrival at Yankee Station in September 1969, Oklahoma City conducted helicopter operations. She also refueled from the replenishment ship Ashtabula and was visited by Rear Admiral Isaman, Commander Carrier Division Seven and Rear Admiral McClendon, Commander Carrier Division Nine. En route to Okinawa, Oklahoma City experienced a drop in chemical readings in number 4 boiler caused by a leak in tube Y-36. Upon arrival Okinawa, the ship conducted Exercise Z-3l-GM, short range Talos missile firing exercise, in Okinawa operating area W-173.

On 4 February 1972, Oklahoma City fired the first successful combat surface-to-surface missile shot in US Navy history, using the new Talos RIM-8H anti-radiation missile to destroy a North Vietnamese mobile air control radar van. On 19 April 1972, the cruiser was attacked by one of two Vietnam People's Air Force (VPAF) MiG-17s, flown by pilots Le Xuan Di and Nguyen Van Bay (aka Bay A), both from the VPAF 923rd Fighter Regiment. Each MiG was armed with two 500 pounds (227 kg) bombs, Van Bay's target was the light cruiser. Van Bay made two passes on the cruiser, having overshot his target on the first run, dropped his two bombs near Oklahoma City. Another accompanying ship, the destroyer Higbee was damaged by a direct hit from the second MiG flown by pilot Le Xuan Di, which destroyed her aft 5–inch gun mount.

In April 1975, Oklahoma City participated in Operation Frequent Wind, the evacuation of Saigon, Vietnam. Following this she was slated for a massive overhaul, as her flagship facilities, as well as her 6-inch guns made her an attractive asset to retain in service. Her now obsolete Talos system would be removed and two Sea Sparrow SAM systems, and two Phalanx CIWS mounts would be fitted. Her machinery and hull would also be repaired and renewed. While funding for this work was appropriated by Congress, it was diverted to other ships, and minimal repairs were made to keep Oklahoma City operational until 1979.

=== Decommissioned and sunk ===
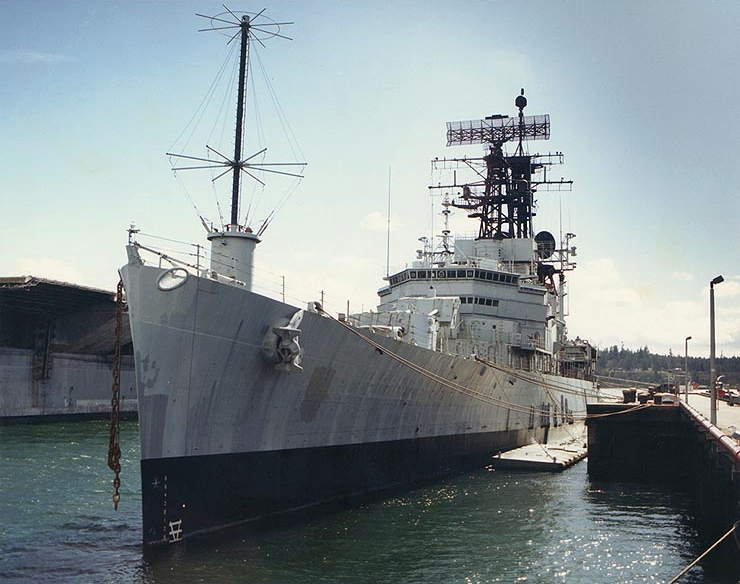
Decommissioned USS Oklahoma City in 1987

Oklahoma City was decommissioned on 15 December 1979, and remained in the Reserve Fleet in Suisun Bay until 9 January 1999, when she was towed to Pearl Harbor, where some usable material was donated for use in outfitting the battleship Missouri as a museum ship. Oklahoma City was then expended as a target during February–March. After being used as a target for air-launched missiles she was hit during Tandem Thrust '99 exercise southwest of Guam by torpedoes from the South Korean submarine Lee Chun, broke in two and sank on 27 March 1999.

Oklahoma City was the last Cleveland-class cruiser in service and had the longest service history of all ships in the class. Accumulating some 13 battle stars for Vietnam-era engagements as flagship of the United States Seventh Fleet, Oklahoma City has been commemorated at the National Museum of the Pacific War originally named the Admiral Nimitz Museum located in Fredericksburg, Texas. Two plaques honor her service in World War II and Vietnam. On 22 September 2006, the World War II plaque was dedicated. The Vietnam Plaque was dedicated on 11 April 2008, and calls her the "Haze grey Ghost of the Western Pacific".

== Awards ==
=== World War II ===
American Campaign Medal
Asiatic–Pacific Campaign Medal with two battle stars.
World War II Victory Medal
Navy Occupation Service Medal

=== Post World War II ===
Combat Action Ribbon
Navy Unit Commendation
Meritorious Unit Commendation with one bronze star
National Defense Service Medal
Armed Forces Expeditionary Medal with two bronze stars
Vietnam Service Medal with 11 stars, two silver and one bronze
Humanitarian Service Medal
Vietnam Gallantry Cross (with Palm)
Vietnam Campaign Medal
