= KRI Nagapasa =

Submarine of the Indonesian Navy

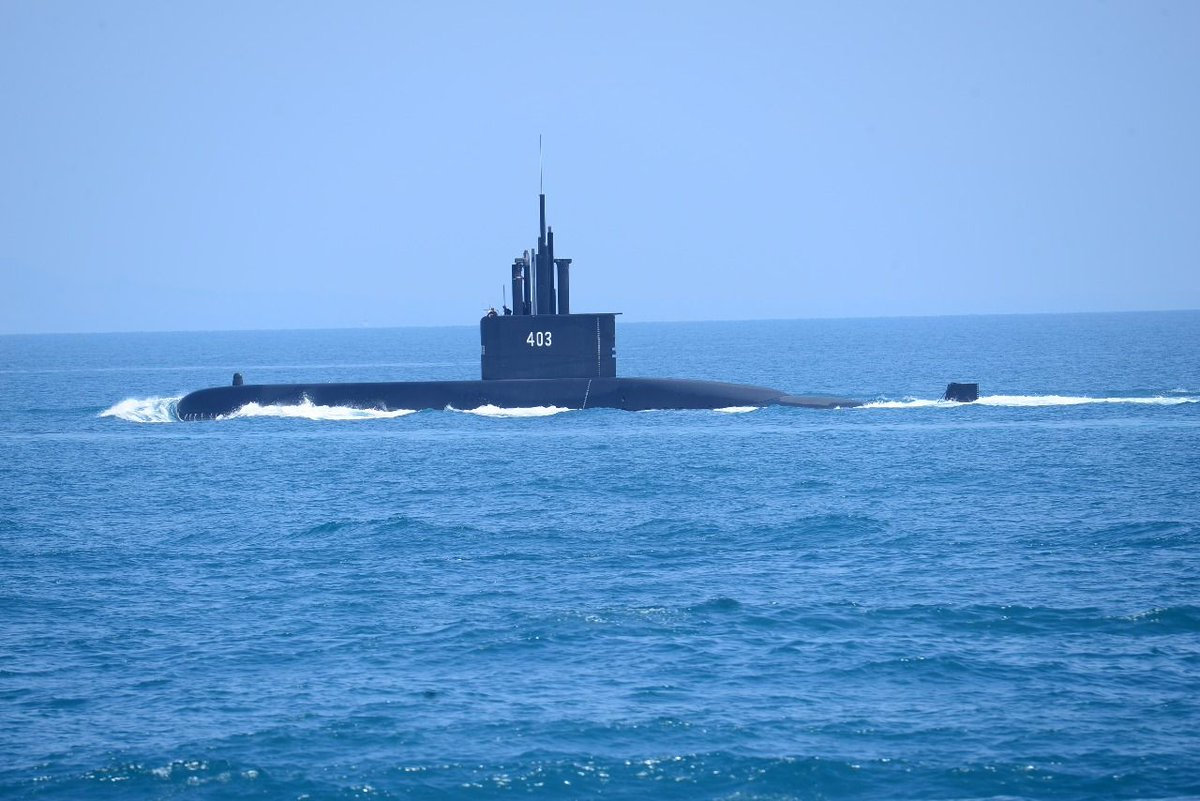
- KRI Nagapasa (403)

History

Indonesia
- Name: KRI Nagapasa
- Namesake: Nagapasha
- Ordered: 21 December 2011
- Awarded: $1.1 billion for 3 submarines to Daewoo Shipbuilding & Marine Engineering
- Laid down: 9 April 2015
- Launched: 24 March 2016
- Commissioned: 2 August 2017
- Identification: 403
- Status: Active

General characteristics
- Class & type: Nagapasa-class submarine
- Displacement: 1,400 tons
- Length: 61.3 m (201 ft 1 in)
- Beam: 6.3 m (20 ft 8 in)
- Draft: 5.5 m (18 ft 1 in)
- Propulsion: 4 x MTU 12V493 diesel generators; 3,700 kW (5,000 shp)
- Speed: 11 knots (20 km/h; 13 mph) surfaced; 21.5 knots (39.8 km/h; 24.7 mph) submerged
- Range: 11,000 nmi (20,000 km; 13,000 mi) at 10 kn (19 km/h; 12 mph) surfaced, 8,000 nmi (15,000 km; 9,200 mi) at 10 kn (19 km/h; 12 mph) snorkeling, 400 nmi (740 km; 460 mi) at 4 kn (7.4 km/h; 4.6 mph), submerged
- Endurance: 50 days
- Test depth: 500 m (1,600 ft)
- Complement: 40 crew
- Sensors & processing systems: Kongsberg MSI-90U Mk 2 combat management system; Atlas Elektronik CSU-90 active and passive sonar; Wärtsilä ELAC KaleidoScope sonar suite; Flank sonar arrays; Pegasso RESM system; Aries radar; ECPINS-W integrating navigation and tactical systems; L3's MAPPS integrated platform management system; Safran's Sigma 40XP inertial navigation systems; Hensoldt SERO 400 & OMS 100 periscope; ZOKA acoustic torpedo countermeasures
- Armament: 8 × 533 mm (21 in) torpedo tubes; 14 Black Shark torpedoes

KRI Nagapasa (403) is a submarine of the Indonesian Navy. She is the lead ship of the Nagapasa-class submarines of the Indonesian Navy that are an upgraded variant of Korea's Chang Bogo class. The vessel was built by the South Korean Daewoo Shipbuilding & Marine Engineering (DMSE) and was commissioned in August 2017. She is one of three submarines purchased for a total of $1.1 billion ($350m per submarine) from Korea.

== Specifications ==
Nagapasa-class diesel-electric submarines, including Nagapasa herself, are 61.3 metres (201 ft 1 in) long and 7.6 metres (24 ft 11 in) wide, with a displacement of 1,400 tonnes and a submerged speed of 21 knots (39 km/h; 24 mph). The vessel has a maximum operating range of 10,000 nautical miles (19,000 km).

== Equipment ==
Nagapasa is equipped with Black Shark torpedoes manufactured by Italian Whitehead Sistemi Subacquei, which has a speed of 50 knots (93 km/h; 58 mph) and a range of 50 kilometres (31 mi), and utilizes the Kongsberg MSI-90U Mk 2 Combat Management System and the Wärtsilä ELAC KaleidoScope sonar suite (consisting of a cylindrical array, a flank array, an acoustic intercept sonar and a mine avoidance sonar). For navigation, the vessel uses the Sagem Sigma 40 XP inertial navigation system and the ECPINS-W Integrating Navigation and Tactical Systems from OSI Maritime Systems.

Nagapasa's periscope is a combination of the Hensoldt Sero 400 and OMS 100. Submarines of the class also possess ZOKA acoustic torpedo countermeasures manufactured by Turkish company ASELSAN.

== Service history ==
The submarine was ordered on 21 December 2011 as part of a US$1.07 billion contract between Indonesia and South Korea to provide three submarines, with Daewoo Shipbuilding & Marine Engineering being awarded the contract. A keel laying ceremony was held on 9 April 2015 and the vessel was launched on 24 March 2016, followed by a year-long crew training and sea trials.

The vessel was commissioned by Indonesian Minister of Defense Ryamizard Ryacudu in South Korea on 2 August 2017. Afterwards, the submarine sailed to Surabaya, where she was received by Chief of Staff of the Navy Ade Supandi on 28 August 2017. Her name is based on the Nagapasha, a mythical weapon in the Ramayana. Nagapasa was then assigned to the Indonesian Navy Eastern Fleet Command (Koarmatim).

Shortly after Nagapasa's commissioning, she experienced power shortages and required a battery replacement.

== See also ==
- List of active Indonesian Navy ships
