= List of ship launches in 1980 =

The list of ship launches in 1980 includes a chronological list of all ships launched in 1980.

== List ==
Date	Ship	Class / type	Builder	Location	Country	Notes
4 January	Viking Saga	cruiseferry	Wärtsilä Perno and Turku shipyards	Turku	Finland	For Rederi Ab Sally
5 January	BP Harrier	Tanker	Appledore Shipbuilders Ltd.	Appledore	United Kingdom	For BP Oil Ltd.
12 January	Olfert Fischer	Niels Juel-class corvette	Alborg Vaerft	Aalborg, Denmark	Denmark	For Royal Danish Navy
12 January	SKR 482	Koni-class frigate	Werft 340	Zelenodolsk	Soviet Union	For Soviet Navy
16 January	Boone	Oliver Hazard Perry-class frigate	Todd Pacific Shipyards	Seattle, Washington	United States	
18 January	Sea-Land Mariner	D9-class container ship	Mitsui Engineering & Shipbuilding		Japan	For Sea-Land Corporation
23 January	Pogoria	Sail training ship	Gdańsk Shipyard	Gdańsk	Poland	
25 January	Aradu	MEKO 360 frigate	Blohm + Voss	Hamburg	West Germany	
1 February	Uthlande	ferry	Husumer Schiffswerft GmbH	Husum	West Germany	For Wyker Dampfschiffs-Reederei Föhr-Amrum GmbH
15 February	Viking Song	cruiseferry	Wärtsilä Perno and Turku shipyards	Turku	Finland	For Rederi Ab Sally
16 February	Clifton Sprague	Oliver Hazard Perry-class frigate	Bath Iron Works	Bath, Maine	United States	
16 February	McKee	Emory S. Land-class submarine tender	Lockheed Shipbuilding	Seattle, Washington	United States	
18 February	Nottingham	Type 42 destroyer	Vosper Thornycroft	Southampton, England	United Kingdom	
1 March	Scott	Kidd-class destroyer	Ingalls Shipbuilding	Pascagoula, Mississippi	United States	
1 March	Tobruk	Modified Round Table-class landing ship logistics	Carrington Slipways	Tomago, New South Wales	Australia	
4 March	Brazen	Type 22 frigate	Yarrow Shipbuilders	Glasgow, Scotland	United Kingdom	
12 March	Mochishio	Yūshio-class submarine			Japan	
5 January	BP Hunter	Tanker	Appledore Shipbuilders Ltd.	Appledore	United Kingdom	For BP Oil Ltd.
14 March	Cakra	Cakra-class submarine	Howaldtswerke-Deutsche Werft	Kiel	West Germany	For Indonesian Navy
15 March	Carl Vinson	Nimitz-class aircraft carrier	Newport News Shipbuilding	Newport News, Virginia	United States	
15 March	Lewis B. Puller	Oliver Hazard Perry-class frigate	Todd Pacific Shipyards	San Pedro, California	United States	
18 March	Ishikari	destroyer escort			Japan	
20 March	St Christopher	Ferry	Harland & Wolff	Belfast	United Kingdom	For Sealink.
29 March	Tuzla	General cargo ship			Turkey	For Cayeli Shipping
1 April	Bugsier 14	tugboat	Schiffswerft und Maschf. Max Sieghold	Bremerhaven	West Germany	For Bugsier-, Reederei- und Bergungsgesellschaft
19 April	Boston	Los Angeles-class submarine	Electric Boat	Groton, Connecticut	United States	
26 April	Viking Sally	cruiseferry	Meyer Werft	Papenburg	West Germany	Originally ordered by an unknown Norwegian company. Contract transferred to Rederi Ab Sally.
29 April	Michigan	Ohio-class submarine	Electric Boat	Groton, Connecticut	United States	
15 May	Flatley	Oliver Hazard Perry-class frigate	Bath Iron Works	Bath, Maine	United States	
17 May	Merrimack	Cimarron-class fleet replenishment oiler	Avondale Shipyard	Avondale, Louisiana	United States	
30 May	Stark	Oliver Hazard Perry-class frigate	Todd Pacific Shipyards	Seattle, Washington	United States	
31 May	Montcalm	Georges Leygues-class frigate			France	
6 June	Mercandian Trader II	type FV 610 RoRo-ship	Frederikshavn Vaerft	Frederikshavn	Denmark	For Per Henriksen
9 June	Niedersachsen	Bremen-class frigate	AG Weser	Bremen	West Germany	For German Navy
21 June	SKR-28	Koni-class frigate	Werft 340	Zelenodolsk	Soviet Union	For Soviet Navy
28 June	Chandler	Kidd-class destroyer	Ingalls Shipbuilding	Pascagoula, Mississippi	United States	
11 July	Cableman	Tanker	Appledore Shipbuilders Ltd.	Appledore	United Kingdom	For C. Rowbotham and Sons (Management) Ltd.
25 July	Finlandia	cruiseferry	Wärtsilä Perno and Turku shipyards	Turku	Finland	For Effoa. Planned name when launched was Skandia
26 July	Copeland	Oliver Hazard Perry-class frigate	Todd Pacific Shipyards	San Pedro, California	United States	
1 August	Prinsesse Ragnhild	Cruiseferry	Howaldtswerke-Deutsche Werft	Kiel	West Germany	For Jahre Line
2 August	Cape Cod	Yellowstone-class destroyer tender	National Steel & Shipbuilding	San Diego, California	United States	
16 August	Atlanta	Los Angeles-class submarine	Newport News Shipbuilding	Newport News, Virginia	United States	
27 August	Queen of Surrey	C-class ferry	Burrard Yarrows Corp. Vancouver Division	North Vancouver	Canada	For BC Ferries
30 August	Jack Williams	Oliver Hazard Perry-class frigate	Bath Iron Works	Bath, Maine	United States	
3 September	Rheinland-Pfalz	Bremen-class frigate	Blohm + Voss	Hamburg	West Germany	For German Navy
4 September	Nanggala	Cakra-class submarine	Howaldtswerke-Deutsche Werft	Kiel	West Germany	For Indonesian Navy
23 September	TK-208	Typhoon-class submarine	Sevmash	Severodvinsk	Soviet Union	
25 September	Liverpool	Type 42 destroyer	Cammell Laird	Birkenhead, England	United Kingdom	
25 September	St David	Ferry	Harland & Wolff	Belfast	United Kingdom	For Sealink.
26 September	Sydney	Adelaide-class frigate	Todd Pacific Shipyards	Seattle, Washington	United States	For Royal Australian Navy
21 October	Silvia Regina	cruiseferry	Wärtsilä Perno and Turku shipyards	Turku	Finland	For Rederi AB Svea
30 October	Queen Oak Bay	C-class ferry	Burrard Yarrows Corp. Victoria Division	Victoria	Canada	For BC Ferries
31 October	Tropicale	Cruise ship	Aalborg Vaerft	Aalborg	Denmark	For Carnival Cruise Lines
7 November	Hatsuyuki	Hatsuyuki-class destroyer			Japan	
8 November	Kinterbury	Naval stores carrier	Appledore Shipbuilders Ltd.	Appledore	United Kingdom	For Royal Maritime Auxiliary Service.
16 November	Bloys van Treslong	Kortenaer-class frigate	Wilton-Fijenoord	Schiedam	Netherlands	
22 November	Olau Hollandia	Cruiseferry	AG Weser Seebeckswerft	Bremerhaven	West Germany	For Olau Line
24 November	Manchester	Type 42 destroyer	Vickers Shipbuilding and Engineering	Barrow-in-Furness, England	United Kingdom	
5 December	Gotland	Cruiseferry	Öresundsvarvet	Landskrona	Sweden	For Rederi AB Gotland; chartered to Vaasanlaivat-Vasabåtarna as Wasa Star on delivery
13 December	Baltimore	Los Angeles-class submarine	Electric Boat	Groton, Connecticut	United States	
17 December	Emden	Bremen-class frigate	Nordseewerke	Emden	West Germany	For German Navy
20 December	Gallery	Oliver Hazard Perry-class frigate	Bath Iron Works	Bath, Maine	United States	
Date unknown	Flower of Bristol	Passenger launch	David Abels Boatbuilders Ltd.	Bristol	United Kingdom	For Bristol Packet Boat Trips.
Date unknown	Pill Hobbler II	Launch	David Abels Boatbuilders Ltd.	Bristol	United Kingdom	For Pill Hobblers.
Date unknown	Salvageman	Salvage tug	Chung Wah Shipyard	Hong Kong	Hong Kong	For United Towing Ltd.
Date unknown	Serenity	Passenger launch	David Abels Boatbuilders Ltd.	Bristol	United Kingdom	For private owner.
