= KRI Nanggala (1980) =

Indonesian submarine sunk in 2021

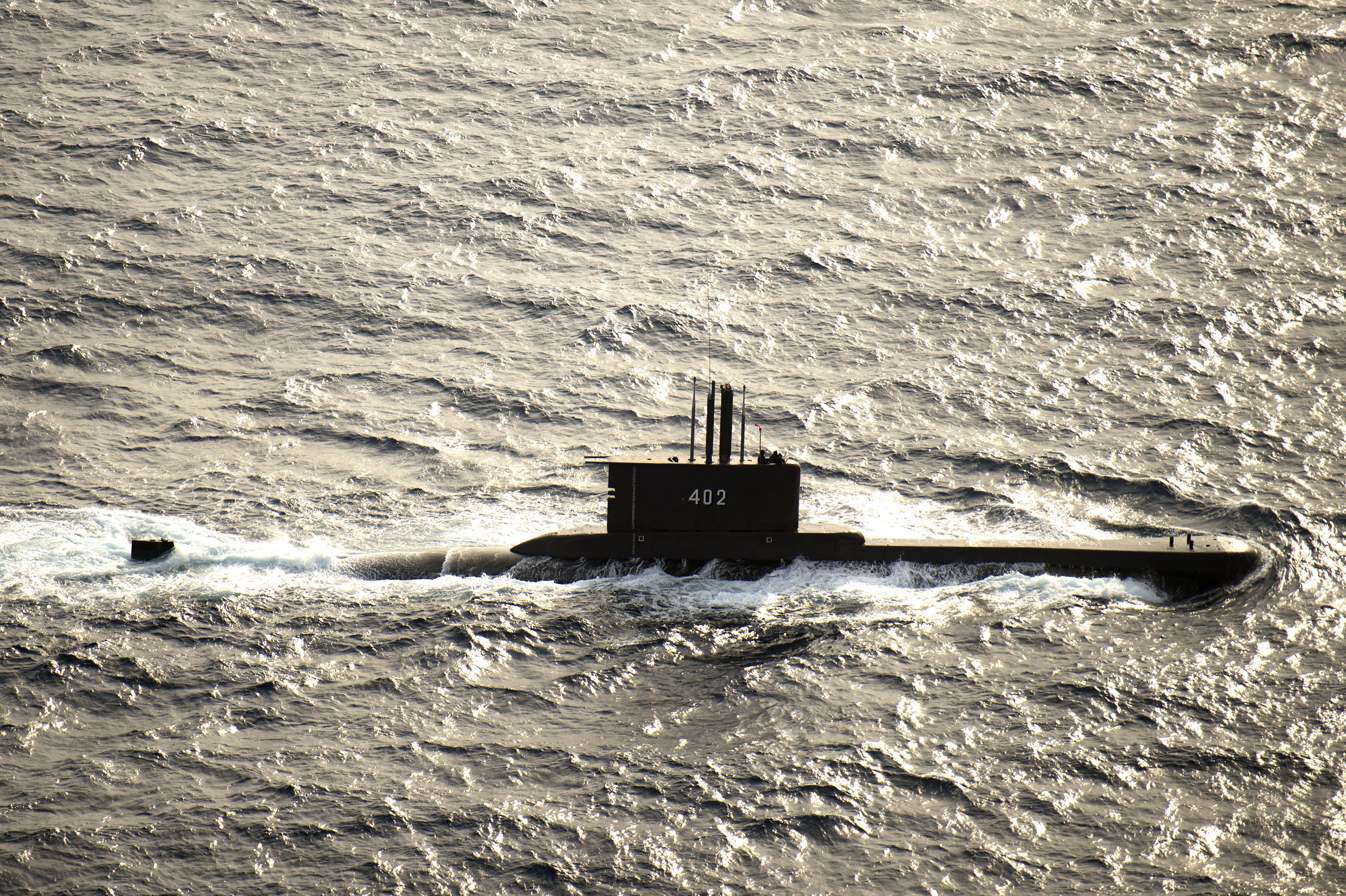
- KRI Nanggala underway in the Java Sea, August 2015

History

Indonesia
- Name: KRI Nanggala
- Namesake: Divine spear of Prabhu Baladewa
- Ordered: 2 April 1977
- Builder: Howaldtswerke-Deutsche Werft
- Laid down: 14 March 1978
- Launched: 10 September 1980
- Completed: 6 July 1981
- Commissioned: 21 October 1981
- Out of service: 21 April 2021
- Identification: Pennant number 402
- Fate: Imploded during torpedo drill, 21 April 2021 (with all hands)
- Badge

General characteristics
- Class & type: Cakra-class attack submarine
- Displacement: 1,285 tons surfaced; 1,390 tons submerged
- Length: 59.5 m (195 ft 3 in)
- Beam: 6.2 m (20 ft 4 in)
- Draft: 5.4 m (17 ft 9 in)
- Propulsion: 4 × MTU 12V493 AZ80 GA31L diesel engines rated at 1.8 MW (2,400 hp); 4 × Siemens alternators rated at 1.7 MW (2,300 hp); 1 × Siemens motor rated at 3.4 MW (4,600 hp); 1 × shaft
- Speed: 11 knots (20 km/h; 13 mph) surfaced; 25 knots (46 km/h; 29 mph) submerged
- Range: 8,200 nmi (15,200 km; 9,400 mi) at 8 kn (15 km/h; 9.2 mph)
- Endurance: 50 days
- Test depth: 240 m (790 ft)
- Complement: 50 including special forces unit
- Crew: 6 officers, 28 enlisted
- Sensors & processing systems: Signaal Sinbad weapons control system; Thomson-CSF Calypso, I-band surface search radar; Atlas Elektronik CSU 3-2 active/passive search and attack sonar; PRS-3/4 passive ranging sonar
- Electronic warfare & decoys: ESM : Thomson-CSF DR2000U; CMS : Kongsberg MSI-90U Mk 2
- Armament: 8 × 533 mm (21 in) bow tubes; 14 × AEG SUT torpedoes

KRI Nanggala (402), also known as Nanggala II, was one of two Cakra-class Type 209/1300 diesel-electric attack submarines of the Indonesian Navy. It sank following an implosion in April 2021.

Ordered in 1977, Nanggala was launched in 1980 and commissioned in 1981. It conducted intelligence gathering operations in the Indian Ocean and around East Timor and North Kalimantan. It was a participant of the international Cooperation Afloat Readiness and Training naval exercise and conducted a passing exercise with USS Oklahoma City. The vessel underwent major refits by Daewoo Shipbuilding & Marine Engineering (DSME) in 2012 and Indonesian state-owned shipyard PT PAL in 2020.

On 21 April 2021, the vessel went missing during a routine exercise in the Bali Sea. It was commanded by Captain Harry Setyawan, and had 49 crewmembers and 3 weapon specialists on board. The Indonesian Navy, assisted by other countries, conducted a search, and three days later debris was discovered 19 kilometres (12 mi) from the point of last contact, and Nanggala was declared sunk. There were no survivors; all 53 people on board the ship died. On 26 April, the Indonesian government awarded posthumous promotions to everyone aboard the ship.

The cause of the sinking is presumed to be a power outage. Nanggala had experienced outages before but recovered successfully. Lt. Col. Heri Oktavian, who was killed in the incident, had previously voiced his frustrations about the maintenance of the ship; he claimed that the workmanship quality and maintenance services performed by PT PAL were unsatisfactory.

== Name ==
The submarine was named after the Nanggala, a powerful, divine short spear wielded by Prabhu Baladewa, a Hindu god mentioned in the Mahabharata and a character in wayang puppet theatre. Legend states that the spear is capable of melting mountains and splitting oceans.

The vessel was also known as Nanggala II in order to differentiate it from RI Nanggala (S-02), an older Whiskey-class submarine sharing the same name.

== Design and construction ==
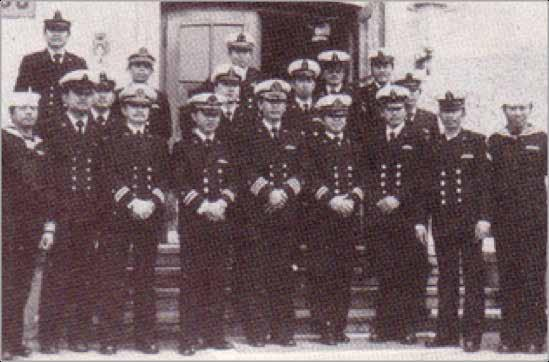
Members of Nanggala's first crew

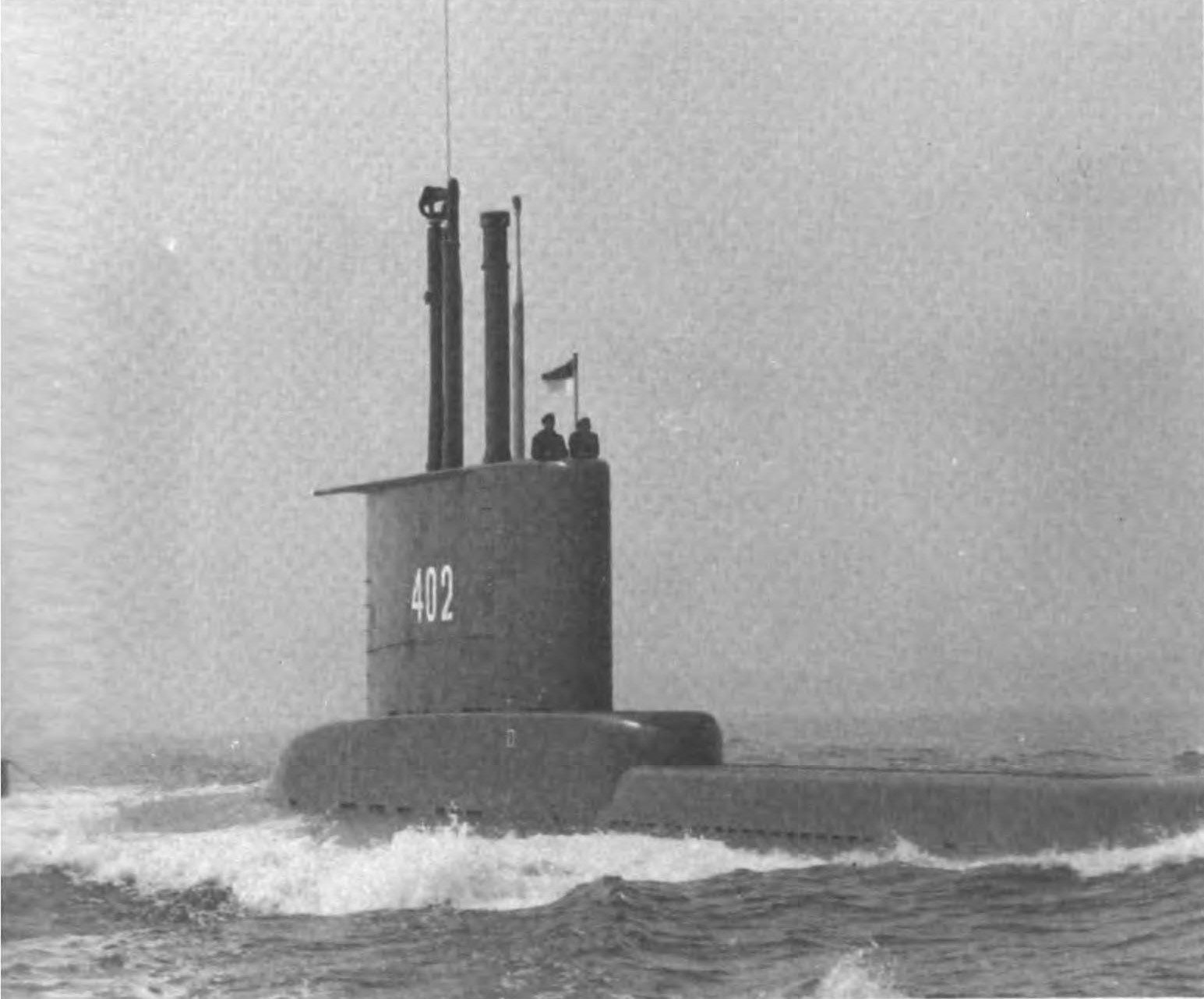
KRI Nanggala before 2012 refitting

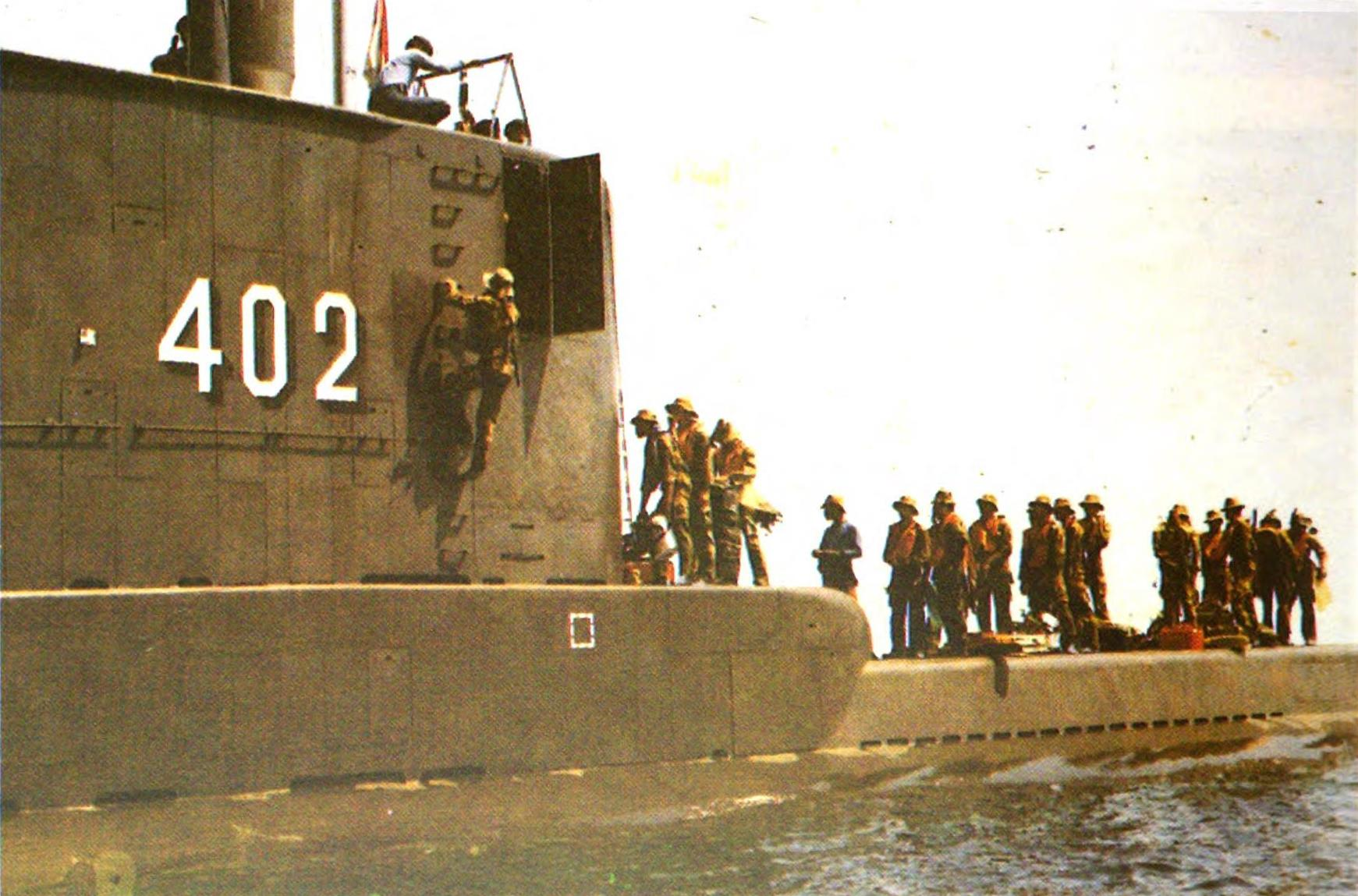
Training near East Kalimantan, 1992

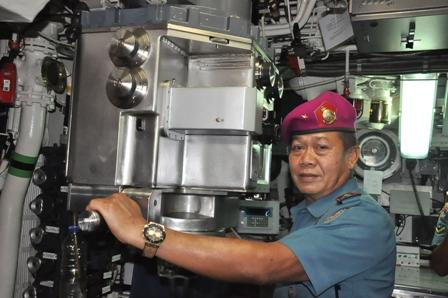
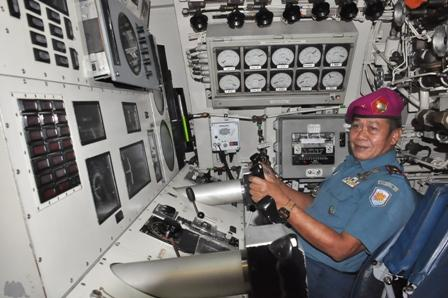
Periscope (above) and control room, in 2017 after South Korean refit

KRI Nanggala was ordered on 2 April 1977 and was financed as part of a US$625 million loan by the West German government to the Indonesian government. About $100 million was spent on the submarine and its sister vessel, KRI Cakra. The vessel was designed by Ingenieurkontor Lübeck of Lübeck, constructed by Howaldtswerke-Deutsche Werft of Kiel, and sold by Ferrostaal of Essen – all acting together as a West German consortium.

Nanggala was laid down on 14 March 1978 and launched on 10 September 1980. It was tested in West German waters before it was handed over to Indonesia on 6 July 1981.

Nanggala left West Germany in early August 1981 with 38 crew members under the command of Commander Armand Aksyah. The submarine was first presented to the public on the 36th anniversary of the Indonesian National Armed Forces on 5 October 1981. Sixteen days later, it was commissioned by the Minister of Defense and Security, General M. Jusuf.

== Historical context ==
During the 1960s, Indonesia was known as one of the largest Asian naval powers, with 12 Soviet-made Whiskey-class submarines in its fleet. However, by 1981, during the New Order, when Cakra and Nanggala arrived in Indonesia to reinforce the country's naval defenses, only one of the twelve Whiskey-class submarines had still retained the ability to dive. The Indonesian government had planned to purchase a Type 206A submarine from Germany in the late 1990s, but was unable to do so due to funding issues.

During the beginning of the Reform Era, an embargo on military equipment imposed by the U.S., as well as continuing financial problems experienced as a result of the Asian financial crisis, meant that the Indonesian Navy was unable to procure any additional submarines until 2017. As a result, Cakra and Nanggala were the only active submarines in the Indonesian Navy between the decommissioning of KRI Pasopati in 1994 and the commissioning of KRI Nagapasa in 2017.

By 2020, Indonesia had made plans to own and operate eight submarines by 2024.

== Service history ==
Nanggala participated in several naval exercises, including the Cooperation Afloat Readiness and Training exercises in 2002 and 2015. In 2004, the boat participated in the Joint Marine Operations Exercise held in the Indian Ocean, during which it sank the decommissioned KRI Rakata. In August 2012, the boat conducted a passing exercise with USS Oklahoma City, accompanied by KRI Diponegoro and a Bölkow-Blohm helicopter.

The submarine conducted a number of intelligence-gathering operations in the waters around Indonesia, including one in the Indian Ocean from April to May 1992, and another around East Timor from August to October 1999, in which the boat tracked the movements of the International Force East Timor as it landed in the region. During May 2005, the submarine was tasked with scouting, infiltrating, and hunting down strategic targets around Ambalat, after Indonesian KRI Tedong Naga and Malaysian KD Rencong were involved in a minor collision near the area.

Nanggala underwent a refit at Howaldtswerke that was completed in 1989. Roughly two decades later, the boat underwent a full refit for two years in South Korea by Daewoo Shipbuilding & Marine Engineering (DSME) that was completed in January 2012. (Note: Nanggala did not return to operations until February 2012.) The refit cost US$63.7 million, replaced much of the submarine's upper structure, and upgraded its weaponry, sonar, radar, combat control and propulsion systems. After the refit, Nanggala became capable of firing four torpedoes simultaneously at four different targets and launching anti-ship missiles such as Exocet or Harpoon. Its safe diving depth was increased to 257 metres (843 ft), and its top speed was increased from 21.5 to 25 knots (39.8 to 46.3 km/h). In November 2016, the submarine was equipped with an ASELSAN KULAÇ echosounder system.

In 2012, three crew members of the Nanggala died in a failed torpedo launch exercise. The submarine was then sent to South Korea for repair.

== Sinking ==
On 21 April 2021, Air Chief Marshal Hadi Tjahjanto, Commander of the Indonesian National Armed Forces, reported that Nanggala was believed to have disappeared in waters about 95 km (51 nautical miles) north of Bali. (Note: The area is around 300 km (160 nautical miles) to the east of the large East Java city of Surabaya.) Indonesian Navy spokesperson First Admiral Julius Widjojono stated that Nanggala had been conducting a torpedo drill, but failed to report its results as expected. Further details emerged that Nanggala had requested permission to dive to fire an SUT torpedo at 03:00 WIB (20:00 UTC, 20 April). At around 04:00, Nanggala should have been flooding its torpedo tubes in preparation for the firing of the torpedo. The last communication with Nanggala was at 04:25, when the commanding officer of the training task force would have authorized the firing of torpedo number 8. Chief of Staff of the Indonesian Navy Yudo Margono reported that Nanggala had fired a live torpedo and a practice torpedo before contact was lost.

The navy sent a distress call to the International Submarine Escape and Rescue Liaison Office at around 09:37 to report the boat as missing and presumably sunk. The navy stated that it was possible that Nanggala experienced a power outage before falling to a depth of 600–700 m (2,000–2,300 ft). Widjojono stated that Nanggala was able to dive to a depth of 500 m (1,600 ft). The deepest areas of the Bali Sea are over 1,500 m (4,900 ft) below sea level. It was also reported that the underwater telephone (UWT) of the submarine was defective during the drill, hampering communications between the boat and rescue vessels in the area.

At the time it went missing, Nanggala had 53 people on board: 49 crew members, 1 commander, and 3 weapons specialists. The highest-ranking naval officer in the submarine was Captain Harry Setyawan, the commander of the submarine unit of the 2nd Fleet Command. Subordinates with him were Commander Heri Oktavian, the commander of the submarine, and Commander Irfan Suri, an officer from the Weapons Materials and Electronics Service.

At noon on 22 April, Yudo Margono stated that the oxygen reserves on Nanggala would be sufficient for the entire crew and passengers for three days after it had submerged, noting that the oxygen would run out on Saturday, 24 April, at 03:00 (20:00 UTC, 23 April). Submarine experts stated that submarines have backup systems that may provide sufficient oxygen for some time depending on the state of the equipment. A crisis center equipped with an ambulance and a mobile hyperbaric chamber was established at the 2nd Fleet Command headquarters in Surabaya. The center was also a source of information for the media and families of the submarine crew members.

Indonesian president Joko Widodo stated that the safety of the crew of Nanggala was of top priority and invited everyone to pray for the crew's safety.

== Rescue efforts ==
On 21 April around 07:00, an aerial search revealed traces of an oil spill on the surface of the water near the location where the submarine was believed to have dived. Indonesian Navy deployed three warships—KRI Diponegoro, KRI Raden Eddy Martadinata, and KRI I Gusti Ngurah Rai—to search for Nanggala. Widjojono stated that a team of divers was searching for the boat. Janes Defence News also reported that the navy had sent a number of other warships to the area. The governments of Australia, Singapore, and India had responded to Indonesian requests for assistance.

On 22 April, the Indonesian Navy reported that an oil slick had been observed at multiple locations. Indonesian frigate Raden Eddy Martadinata had detected movement underwater at a speed of 2.5 knots (4.6 km/h) but was unable to obtain enough information to identify the contact before it disappeared. Admiral Yudo Margono, Chief Staff of Indonesian Navy, also reported that an Indonesian naval vessel had detected an object that was magnetic at a depth of 50 to 100 metres (160 to 330 feet). (Note: It is unclear if Achmad Riad and Yudo Margono were referring to the same object.)

The Indonesian Navy had deployed six additional ships to the area: KRI Dr. Soeharso, KRI Hasan Basri, KRI Karel Satsuitubun, KRI Singa, KRI Hiu and KRI Layang. Yudo Margono also noted on Thursday that three submarines, five airplanes, and 21 warships had been deployed in the search effort. Submarine KRI Alugoro had also joined the search. KRI Rigel, a warship with more powerful sonar equipment, was expected to arrive on 23 April. The Republic of Singapore Navy deployed its submarine rescue vessel, MV Swift Rescue and the Royal Malaysian Navy sent its MV Mega Bakti respectively, to the scene. The Indian Navy announced that their deep-submergence rescue vehicle (DSRV) had departed naval facilities at Visakhapatnam, Andhra Pradesh, en-route to the search area. U.S. Department of Defense press secretary John Kirby stated that the department was sending airborne assets to assist in the search. These included a Boeing P-8 Poseidon maritime patrol aircraft with one registered as 553.

On 23 April, the Indonesian National Police also sent four police ships equipped with remotely operated vehicles (ROVs) and sonar devices. Fleet Commander Australia, Rear Admiral Mark Hammond announced that HMAS Ballarat and HMAS Sirius would join the search operation. Other nations, including Germany, France, Russia, Turkey, and Thailand, offered assistance.

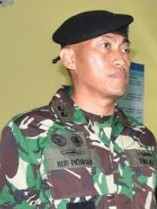
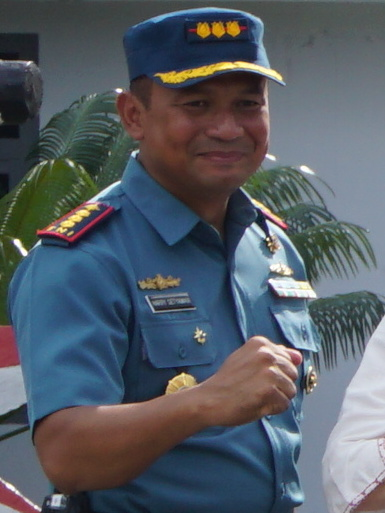
Commander Heri Oktavian (left) and Captain Harry Setyawan, commanders aboard Nanggala when it sank in 2021

=== Discovery ===
The location where Nanggala was found

On 24 April 2021, the Indonesian Navy announced the finding of debris, including a part associated with torpedo tubes, a coolant pipe insulator, a bottle of periscope grease, and prayer rugs. Because the debris was found within 10 nmi (19 km; 12 mi) of the point of last contact and no other vessels were believed to be in the area, the debris was believed to have come from the submarine, and Nanggala was declared sunk. (Note: In addition, Korean writing was found on some of the debris, and Nanggala had been refitted in South Korea in 2012.) Yudo Margono stated that a sonar scan had shown the submarine at a depth of 850 m (2,800 ft), and its crush depth was presumed to be 500 m (1,600 ft). Due to the maximum operational depth limitation of 800 m (2,600 ft) of Rigel's two underwater ROVs, Rigel was unable to launch them and was assisted by the submarine rescue ship MV Swift Rescue of the Republic of Singapore Navy, which launched its 1,000-metre (3,300 ft) depth-capable drone and located and made visual contact with Nanggala at 09:04.

On 25 April 2021, the Indonesian Navy confirmed that the Nanggala had imploded and that all 53 personnel on board were lost. Underwater scans identified parts of the submarine, including the rudder, diving plane, anchor, and external parts of the pressure hull, as well as items such as an MK11 submarine escape suit.

The ROV Super Spartan from MV Swift Rescue of the Singapore Navy first made visual contact with the wreck and determined that the submarine had split into three parts. Using a multibeam echosounder, KRI Rigel confirmed the final position of Nanggala at a depth of 838 m (2,749 ft) at the coordinates 7°48′56″S 114°51′20″E, roughly 1,400 m (1,500 yd) from where Nanggala had dived.

== Analysis ==
=== Cause ===
The Navy said Nanggala might have had a power outage. The boat had experienced a power outage before because of a blown electrical fuse, but the boat successfully recovered after the ship executed an emergency main ballast tank blow. After the finding of debris from Nanggala, Yudo Margono said the submarine might have cracked instead of exploded, as an explosion would have been detected by sonar.

Indonesian legislator and retired Major General Tubagus Hasanuddin suspected the refit, performed by the South Korean firm DSME in 2012, may not have been performed properly. He said that after the refit, the submarine had failed a torpedo firing test, which resulted in three deaths. Hasanuddin also said Nanggala had exceeded its design capacity of 38 with 53 people on board when it sank. Yudo Margono said the vessel was combat ready, had received a letter of acceptance, and had a history of successful firing exercises. Hasanuddin also questioned why 53 people were allowed on board the Nanggala when it sunk despite the ship only being designed for 34 crew.

=== Alleged poor maintenance ===
Nanggala commander Lt. Col. Heri Oktavian, who died in the incident, had voiced his frustration with the maintenance status of the Nanggala to Edna C. Pattisna, a close friend, who is also a reporter with local news media Kompas, for which she published an article titled Message from KRI Nanggala-402 Commander. Oktavian claimed that the workmanship quality and maintenance services performed by state-owned shipyard PT PAL Indonesia were unsatisfactory and suffered from frequent delays. He lamented that an officer encountered criticism from his superiors for reporting the poor workmanship by PT PAL on the KRI Alugoro, a Changbogo-class submarine assembled by PT PAL's Surabaya yard and launched on 11 April 2019. Oktavian was also quoted as saying: "This submarine (the Alugoro) by PT PAL, there's nothing good about it". Nanggala was last serviced by PT PAL in 2020. No further refitting of Nanggala was requested to DSME after the 2012 refit despite the need for submarines to undergo maintenance at least once every six years.

== Aftermath ==
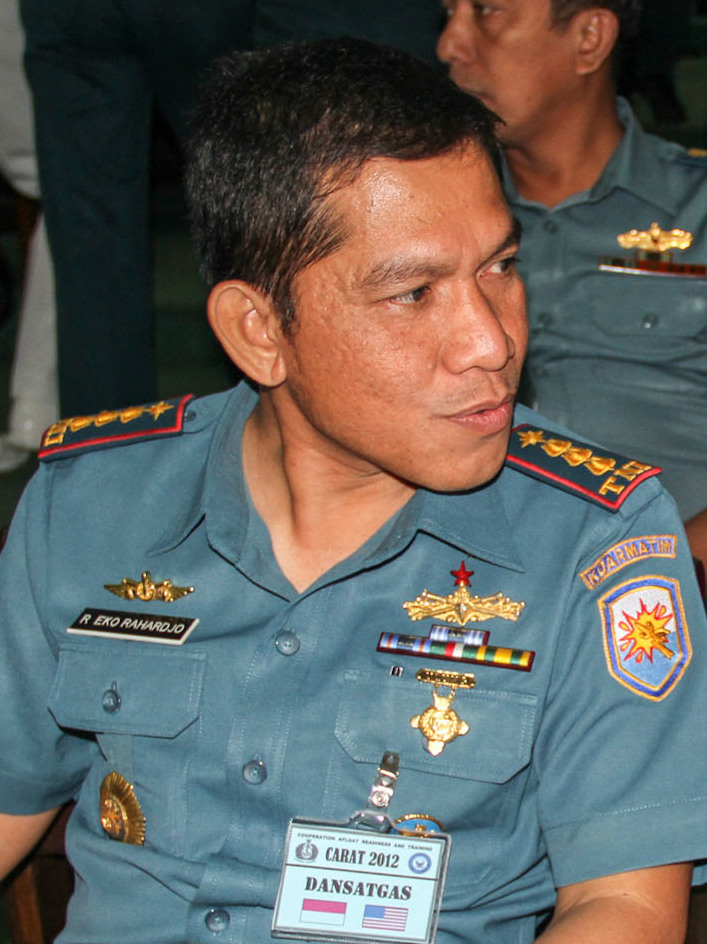
Rahmat Eko Rahardjo was removed from his post.

After the Indonesian Navy declared Nanggala lost with all hands, the People's Consultative Assembly recommended a posthumous promotion for all personnel on board. Hadi Tjahjanto stated that he would propose the promotions to Indonesian President Joko Widodo. A day later, on 26 April, Joko Widodo announced that the government would award a posthumous promotion and confer posthumously the Bintang Jalasena (Navy Meritorious Service Star) to everyone on board Nanggala. The ceremony conferring the awards and promotions was held on 29 April, attended by Joko Widodo, Minister of Defense Prabowo Subianto, Hadi Tjahjanto, and Yudo Margono. (Note: All awardees received the Bintang Jalasena Nararya 'Navy Meritorious Service Star, Third Class'.)

Tubagus Hasanuddin recommended that the Indonesian Navy's remaining Cakra-class submarine be taken out of service. Parliamentarian Utut Adianto stated that Indonesia's defences required modernization. Frans Wuwung, former head of the engine room of Nanggala, stated that despite the submarine's age, its equipment was still in good condition due to proper maintenance and did not consider such a modernization necessary.

Two days after the sub had been declared sunk, Rahmat Eko Rahardjo, the commander of the 2nd Fleet Naval Combat Squad who had given permission for Nanggala to dive, and ING Sudihartawan, the commander of the 2nd Fleet, were relieved of their commands by Hadi Tjahjanto. Hadi appointed Iwan Isnurwanto, a former Nanggala crew member and chief of staff, to replace the latter. Iwan later appointed Wirawan Ady Prasetya — another Nanggala commander — to replace the position that Harry had left posthumously.

=== Reactions ===
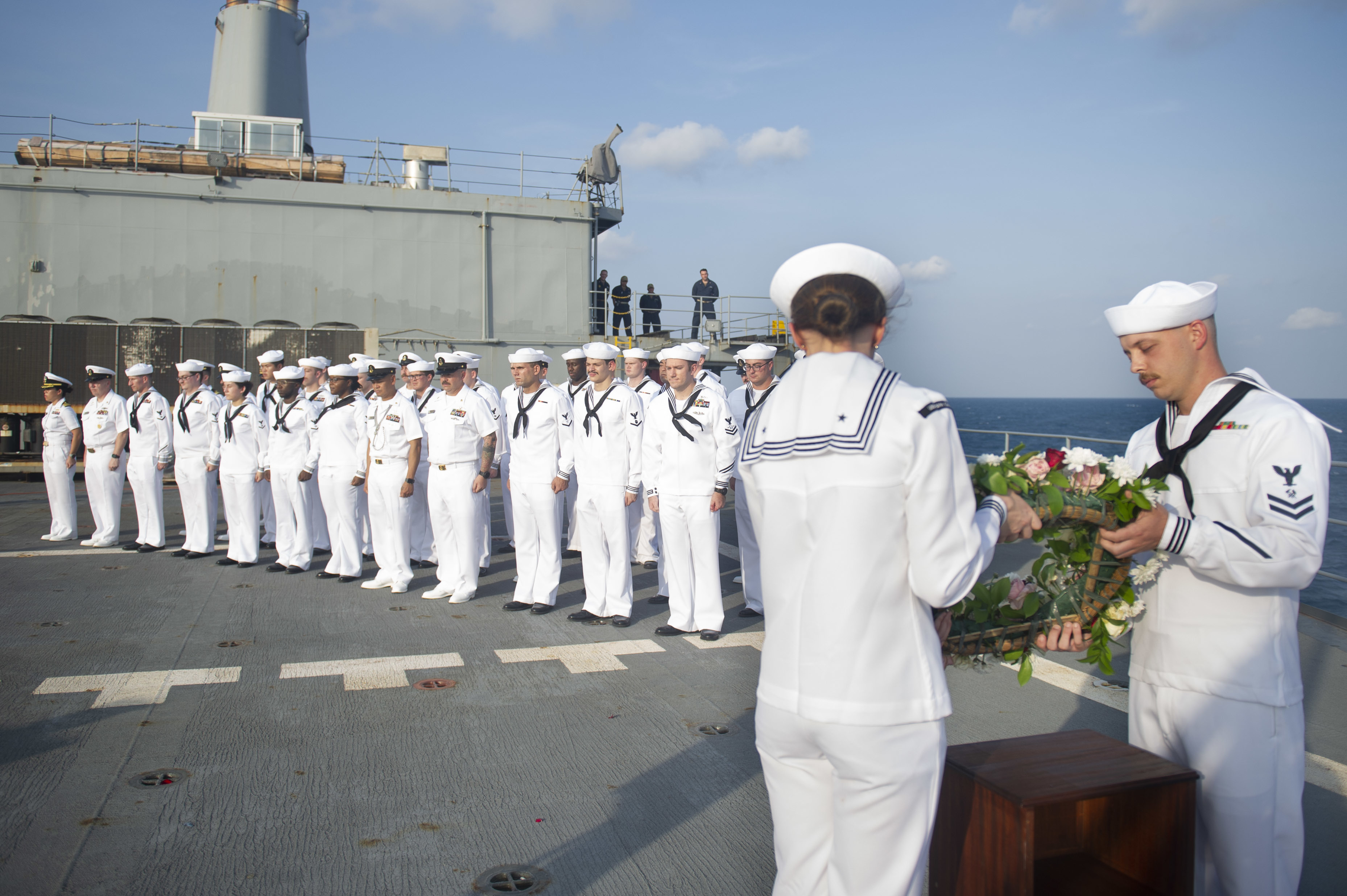
US sailors aboard USS Frank Cable hold a wreath-laying ceremony in honor of Nanggala in 2022

Condolences were expressed by the King of Malaysia, Australian Prime Minister Scott Morrison, the South Korean Ministry of Defense, Singapore Defence Minister Ng Eng Hen and Senior Minister Teo Chee Hean, the UK's Minister of State for Asia, Nigel Adams, and ambassador to Indonesia, Owen Jenkins. United States Secretary of Defense Lloyd Austin expressed his "heartfelt concern" in a call with Prabowo Subianto.

During the search, use of the hashtag #PrayForKRINanggala402 and #KRINanggala402 became popular on Twitter. After Nanggala had been declared sunk, the phrases "On Eternal Patrol" and "Rest In Peace", and the motto Wira Ananta Rudira (Sanskrit: Steadfast to the End), used by the submarine unit to which Nanggala belonged, saw increased usage.

== Salvage ==
On 3 May, two Chinese navy ships, ocean tug Nantuo (195) and ocean salvage and rescue ship Yongxingdao (863), arrived to assist with the recovery of the wreck. Scientific research vessel Explorer 2 was scheduled to arrive the next day. (Note: Explorer 2 is also known by its Chinese name Tan Suo Er Hao.) There have also been discussions between the Indonesian Navy and state-owned oil regulator SKK Migas to raise the submarine.

By 18 May, the team had successfully recovered two life rafts that weighed approximately 700 kg (1,500 lb) each. However, they had yet to locate the submarine's pressure hull, and gave up on lifting the bridge after a sling was broken during a failed attempt, as the bridge likely weighed over 20 tonnes (20,000 kg; 44,000 lb).

== Government housing assistance for families ==
On 20 April 2022, Defense Minister Prabowo Subianto gave keys to housing built by the Ministry of Public Works and Housing to 53 families of the deceased crew.

== Notable former crew members ==
- Rear Admiral Frans Wuwung, former head of engine room, member of the House of Representatives (2001–2002).
- Admiral Muhammad Ali, former commander, 28th Chief of Staff of the Navy.

== See also ==
- Kursk submarine disaster – 2000 submarine accident in the Barents Sea
- Chinese submarine 361 – 2003 submarine disaster
- Disappearance of ARA San Juan – 2017 submarine disaster
- Titan submersible implosion – 2023 maritime disaster
- List of submarine incidents since 2000
