= KRI Singa =

FPB-57 patrol boat of Indonesian Navy

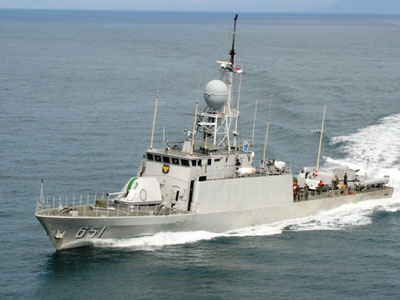
- KRI Singa (651)

History

Indonesia
- Name: Singa
- Namesake: Lion
- Builder: Lürssen Werft; PT PAL
- Launched: 1988
- Commissioned: 1988
- Home port: Surabaya
- Identification: Pennant number: 651
- Status: Active

General characteristics
- Type: FPB-57 Nav II patrol boat
- Displacement: 445 tonnes
- Length: 58.10 m (190.6 ft)
- Beam: 7.62 m (25.0 ft)
- Draught: 2.95 m (9.7 ft)
- Propulsion: 2 x MTU 60V 956 TB92
- Speed: 27 knots (50 km/h)
- Range: 6,000 nautical miles (11,000 km) at 15 knots (28 km/h)
- Complement: 42 crew
- Sensors & processing systems: Sonar PHS-32; Decca Radar; DR-2000 S3 intercept fire control
- Electronic warfare & decoys: Dagie decoy RL
- Armament: 1 x SAK 57mm Bofor; 1 x SAK 40mm Bofors; 2 x Rheinmetall 20mm autocannons; 2 x Single torpedo

KRI Singa (651) is a FPB-57 Nav II patrol boat currently operated by the Indonesian Navy.

== Service history ==
Singa was built by Lürrsen-Werft, fitted out by PT PAL and launched in 1988. The ship was commissioned in 1988.

On 22 April 2021, she was deployed off Bali in search for KRI Nanggala, which went missing off the waters of Bali during a torpedo drill. The navy had deployed six additional ships to the area which were KRI Dr. Soeharso, KRI Hasan Basri, KRI Karel Satsuit Tubun, KRI Singa, KRI Hiu and KRI Layang.

== Appearance in Fiction ==
KRI Singa was shown as the ship used by the Indonesian Navy to try capturing Rocky in the film K.G.F: Chapter 2.
