= KRI Layang =

FPB-57 patrol boat of Indonesian Navy

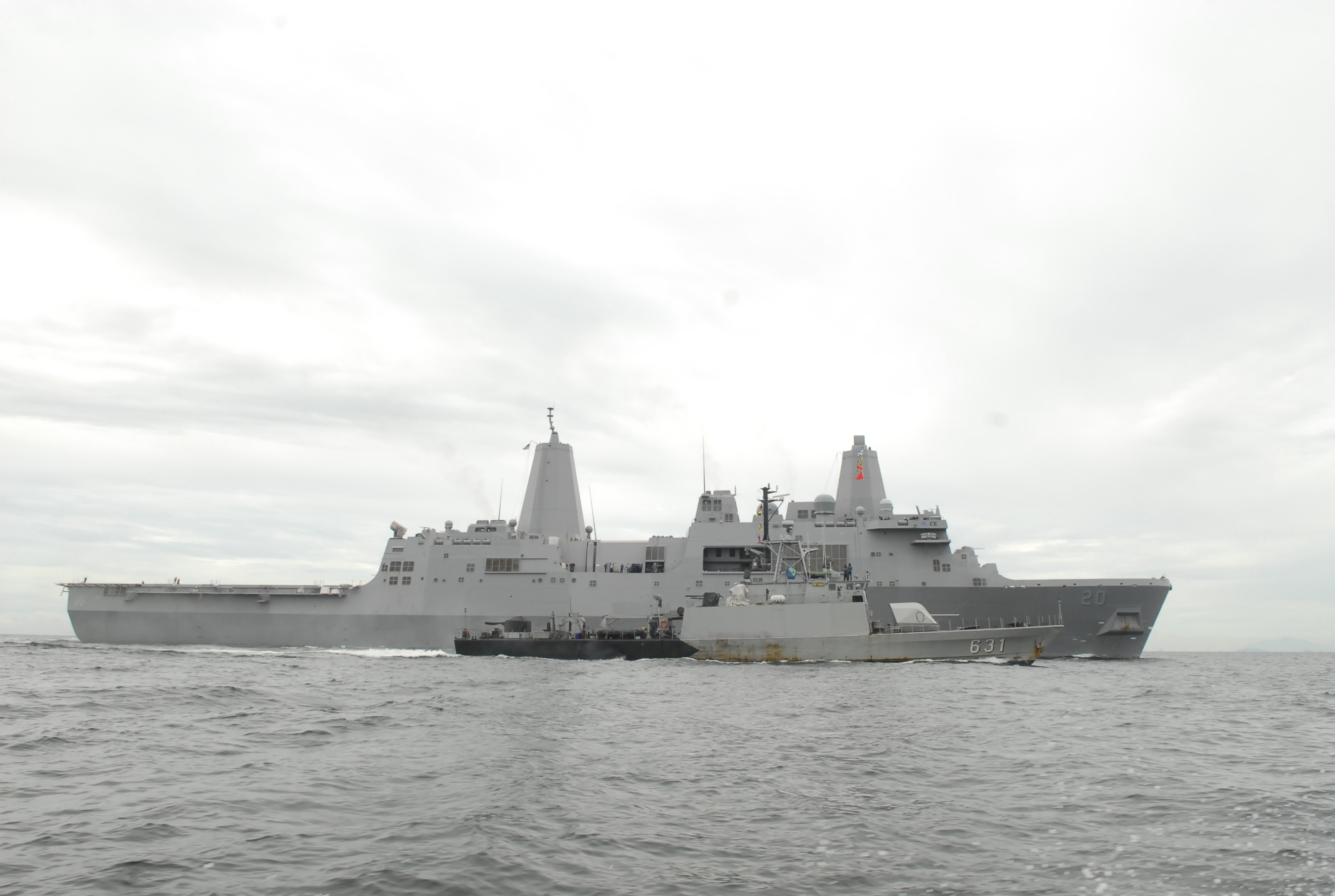
- FPB-57 Nav V patrol boat

History

Indonesia
- Name: Layang
- Namesake: Kite
- Builder: Lürssen Werft; PT PAL
- Launched: 2000
- Commissioned: 2000
- Home port: Surabaya
- Identification: Pennant number: 635
- Status: Active

General characteristics
- Type: FPB-57 Nav V patrol boat
- Displacement: 447 tonnes
- Length: 58.10 m (190.6 ft)
- Beam: 7.62 m (25.0 ft)
- Propulsion: 2 x MTU 60V 956 TB92
- Speed: 30 knots (56 km/h)
- Range: 6,000 nautical miles (11,000 km) at 15 knots (28 km/h)
- Complement: 51 crew
- Sensors & processing systems: Sonar PHS-32; Decca Radar; DR-2000 S3 intercept fire control
- Electronic warfare & decoys: Dagie decoy RL
- Armament: 1 x SAK 57mm Bofor; 1 x SAK 40mm Bofors; 2 x Rheinmetall 20mm autocannons; 2 x C-802 anti-ship missile

KRI Layang (635) is a FPB-57 Nav V patrol boat currently operated by the Indonesian Navy.

== Service history ==
Layang was built by Lürrsen-Werft, fitted out by PT PAL and launched in 2000. The ship was commissioned in 2000.

On 22 April 2021, she was deployed off Bali in search for KRI Nanggala, which went missing off the waters of Bali during a torpedo drill. The navy had deployed six additional ships to the area which were KRI Dr. Soeharso, KRI Hasan Basri, KRI Karel Satsuit Tubun, KRI Singa, KRI Hiu and KRI Layang.
