= Setyawan =

Setyawan is a surname. Notable people with the surname include:

- Albert Yonathan Setyawan (born 1983), Indonesian artist
- Harry Setyawan (1975 – 2021), Indonesian naval officer
- Herrie Setyawan, Indonesian football coach
- Heru Setyawan (born 1993), Indonesian footballer
