= USS Wenatchee =

USS Wenatchee may refer to the following ships operated by the United States Navy:

- USS Wenatchee (AT-118), was a Abnaki-class tugboat laid down in 1944 and struck in 1962
- Wenatchee (YTB-808), was a Natick-class tugboat acquired in 1970 and in active service
