= Frans Wuwung =

Indonesian naval officer and politician

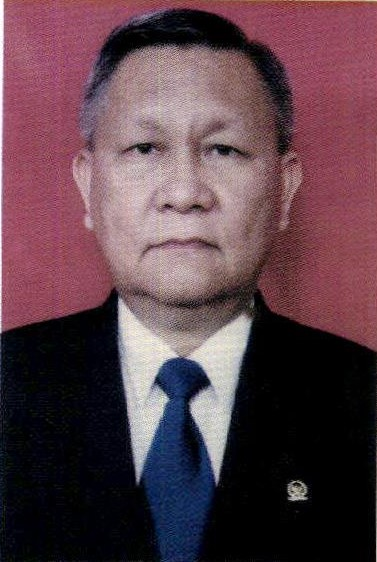

Member of the People's Representative Council
- In office 27 April 2001 – 14 May 2002
- President: Megawati Sukarnoputri
- Preceded by: Sutanto
- Succeeded by: R. Sulistyadi
- Parliamentary group: Armed Forces/Police

Personal details
- Born: April 1, 1947 (age 79) Manado, State of East Indonesia
- Spouse: Christine Theresia Soewastiardjo
- Children: Irene Margaretha; Johannes Antonius W.

Military service
- Allegiance: Indonesia
- Branch/service: Navy
- Years of service: 1968—2002
- Rank: Rear Admiral
- Commands: KRI Nanggala

Frans Wuwung (born 1 April 1947) is an Indonesian naval officer who became a member of the People's Representative Council from 2001 to 2002.

Wuwung was born on 1 April 1947 in Manado, State of East Indonesia. He entered the Indonesian Naval Academy in 1965 and graduated in 1968. Wuwung had served as the chief of the engine room of KRI Nanggala with the rank of major and Indonesia's naval attaché in the United States of America from 1991 until 1994 with the rank of lieutenant colonel and colonel. Wuwung became a member of the People's Representative Council on 27 April 2001. He was replaced a year later by R. Sulistyadi and retired on the same year with the rank of rear admiral.

After his retirement from the military, Wuwung became the chairman of the Surabaya GPIB Health Foundation.

Wuwung was married to Christine Theresia Soewastiardjo. The couple has two children, namely Irene Margaretha, who was born in 1975, and Johannes Antonius, who was born in 1978.
