= Harry Setyawan =

Indonesian naval officer (1975–2021)

Commodore Harry Setyawan
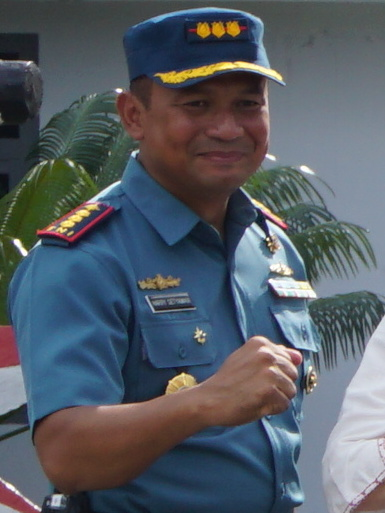
- Born: 18 October 1975
- Died: 21 April 2021 (aged 45); Bali Sea, Indonesia
- Education: Indonesian Naval Academy
- Spouse: Winny Widayanti
- Military career
- Allegiance: Indonesia
- Branch: Navy
- Service years: 1997–2021
- Rank: Colonel Commodore (posthumous)
- Service number: 13288/P
- Units: KRI Nanggala; KRI Nagapasa; Ranai Naval Base; 2nd Fleet Submarine Unit

Commodore Harry Setyawan (18 October 1975 – 21 April 2021) was a naval officer who held several different commands in the Indonesian Navy, culminating in being Commander of the 2nd Fleet Submarine Unit. He died in the sinking of the KRI Nanggala.

== Early life ==
Harry Setyawan was born on 18 October 1975 as the oldest child of three brothers. His father was an air force officer while his mother, Ida Farida, was a housewife.

Setyawan attended State Junior High School 3 Depok and State Senior High School 1 Depok. While studying at high school, Setyawan formed a band community.

== Military career ==
After graduating from high school in 1994, Harry Setyawan joined the Indonesian Naval Academy. During his studies in the academy, Harry participated in the Cutty Sark Tall Ship Race in Mallorca as a crew member of Arung Samudera. Harry and his other crewmates won the race. Harry graduated from the academy in 1997.

On 16 May 2014, Setyawan was made the commander of KRI Nanggala, replacing Wirawan Ady Prasetya. Adi held the command for a year, as on 12 August 2015 he was replaced. He was subsequently appointed one of the officials for the Jang Bogo-class submarine procurement project in South Korea. The project resulted in a new submarine for Indonesia, named KRI Nagapasa (403). Harry was made the commander of the submarine on 2 August 2017 and the submarine arrived in Indonesia twenty six days later. Harry led the submarine for less than a year and on 2 February 2018 he ended his tenure.

== Commander of the Ranai Naval Base ==
After his term in KRI Nagapasa, Harry Setyawan was made the commander of the Ranai Naval Base, which was located in the Natuna Sea, on 14 February 2018. Setyawan's tenure in the naval base saw him handling Vietnamese fishing boats which entered Indonesia's maritime territory illegally. Aside from fishing boats, Harry also instructed the investigation of the tanker Hai Soon X which trespassed Indonesia's sea territory in January 2019.

In March 2018, Setyawan announced that the navy is preparing to improve the strength of the fleet in the Natuna Sea. He also added that the improvements would include the construction of a new submarine base.

Setyawan ended his command of the base on 9 October 2019. Before he was replaced in the command, Harry had already been made the Operations Assistant to the Commander of the Maritime Security Group in September that year. In June 2020, Harry was instructed to leave his post in the Maritime Security Group and to study at the Indonesian Armed Forces Command and General Staff College (Sesko TNI).

== Commander of the 2nd Fleet Submarine Unit ==
Setyawan graduated from Sesko TNI in December 2020 and on 6 March the next year he became the Commander of the 2nd Fleet Submarine Unit. Several days after he was made the commander of the submarine unit, he conducted an exercise for submarine control and stability.

=== Death ===
On 21 April 2021, Setyawan was on board the KRI Nanggala, which was about to conduct a torpedo drill. After the submarine fired a live SUT torpedo, the boat went missing. The submarine was declared sunk on 24 April 2021 and all of the crew, including Setyawan, were declared dead on the next day. President Joko Widodo approved a posthumous rank promotion for all of the boat's crew following the incident, which made Setyawan a Commodore (Indonesian: Laksamana Pertama).

== Family ==
Setyawan was married to Winny Widayati. The couple had four children.
