= KRI Nanggala =

KRI Nanggala is the name of the following submarines of the Indonesian Navy:

- KRI Nanggala, a Whiskey-class submarine sold to Indonesia by the Soviet Union
- KRI Nanggala (1980) (sometimes Nanggala II), a Cakra-class submarine that was lost with all hands during an exercise in 2021
