= USS Ute =

Tugboat of the United States Navy

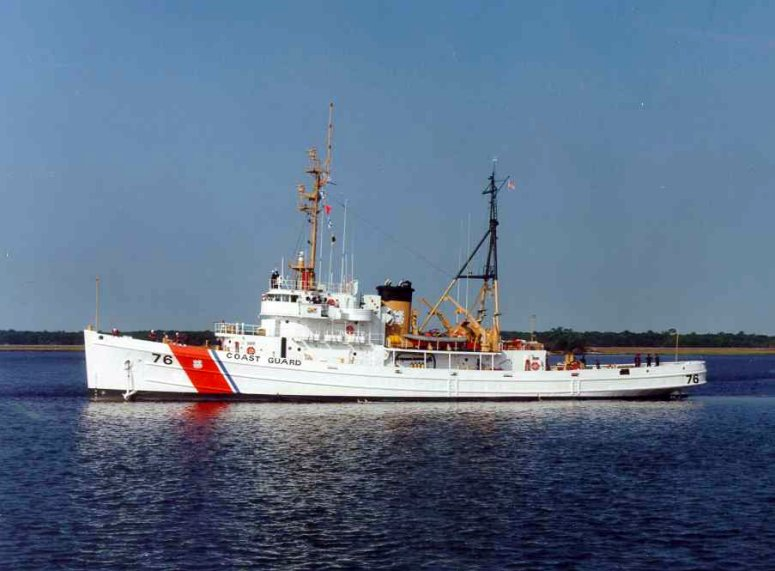
- USCGC Ute underway, 2 June 1986, location unknown.

History

United States
- Name: USS UTE (AT-76)
- Namesake: Ute people
- Builder: United Engineering Co.
- Laid down: 27 February 1942
- Launched: 24 June 1942
- Commissioned: 13 December 1942
- Decommissioned: 13 July 1946
- Reclassified: Fleet ocean tug ATF-76, 15 May 1944
- Honors and awards: 3 x battle stars for World War II
- Fate: Sunk as a target, 4 August 1991
- Recommissioned: 14 September 1951
- Decommissioned: 30 August 1974
- Honors and awards: 2 × battle stars for Korean War; 9 × campaign stars for Vietnam War
- Recommissioned: USCGC UTE (WMEC-76) 30 September 1980
- Decommissioned: 26 May 1988
- Stricken: 23 January 1989
- Fate: Sunk as a target, 4 August 1991
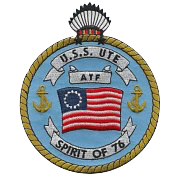
- Badge

General characteristics
- Class & type: Navajo-class fleet tug
- Displacement: 1,646 long tons (1,672 t)
- Length: 205 ft (62 m)
- Beam: 38 ft 6 in (11.73 m)
- Draft: 15 ft 3 in (4.65 m)
- Propulsion: Diesel-electric; four General Motors 12-278A diesel main engines driving four General Electric generators and three General Motors 3-268A auxiliary services engines; single screw; 3,600 shp (2,685 kW)
- Speed: 16 knots (30 km/h; 18 mph)
- Complement: 76
- Armament: 1 × 3 in (76 mm) caliber gun; 2 × twin 40 mm gun mounts; 2 × single 20 mm guns

USS Ute (AT-76) was a Navajo-class fleet tug constructed for the United States Navy during World War II. Her purpose was to aid ships, usually by towing, on the high seas or in combat or post-combat areas, plus "other duties as assigned." She served in the Pacific Ocean and after successful World War II her crew returned home with three battle stars. After being recommissioned in 1951, she saw action in both the Korean War and the Vietnam War earning two battle stars in Korea and nine campaign stars in Vietnam.

== Description ==
International radio call sign of USS Ute
November	Uniform	Quebec	Echo

Ute was laid down 27 February 1942 by United Engineering Co., Alameda, California and launched on 24 June 1942. She was commissioned on 12 December 1942 sponsored by Miss Jean Kell; and commissioned on 29 April 1943.

== Decommissioning ==
Ute was struck from the Naval Register on 23 January 1989 and sunk as a target on 4 August 1991.

== Awards ==
Ute received three battle stars for World War II service, four battle stars for Korean service and nine campaign stars for Vietnam service.
