= USS Menominee (AT-73) =

Tugboat of the United States Navy

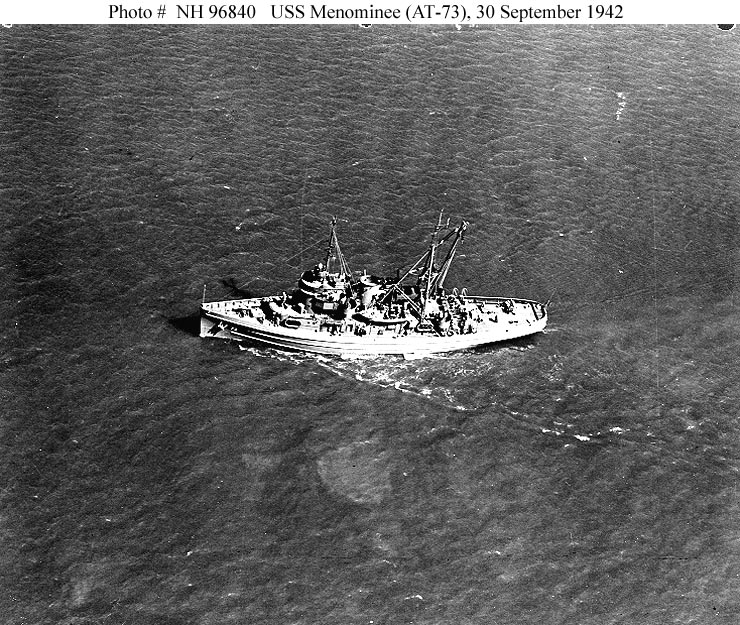
- USS Menominee (AT-73) in San Francisco Bay, 30 September 1942.

History

United States
- Name: USS Menominee
- Namesake: Menominee
- Builder: United Engineering Co.
- Laid down: 27 September 1941
- Launched: 14 February 1942
- Commissioned: 25 September 1942
- Decommissioned: 15 November 1946
- Reclassified: Fleet ocean tug ATF-73, 15 May 1944
- Stricken: 1 November 1959
- Identification: Hull symbol: AT-73; Code letters: NUMO
- Honors and awards: 5 × battle stars for World War II
- Fate: Transferred to Indonesia, renamed Rakata (928)

Indonesia
- Name: KRI Rakata
- Namesake: Rakata
- Acquired: 26 January 1961
- Identification: Pennant number: 928 (1961); Pennant number: 922 (1980s)
- Fate: Sunk as target 2004

General characteristics
- Class & type: Navajo-class fleet tug
- Displacement: 1,240 long tons (1,260 t)
- Length: 205 ft (62 m)
- Beam: 38 ft 6 in (11.73 m)
- Draft: 15 ft 4 in (4.67 m)
- Propulsion: Diesel-electric; four General Motors 12-278 diesel main engines driving four General Electric generators and three General Motors 3-268A auxiliary services engines; single screw; 3,000 shp (2,237 kW)
- Speed: 16.5 knots (30.6 km/h; 19.0 mph)
- Complement: 86 (initial); 67 (as of 1989)
- Sensors & processing systems: as of 1989; AN/SPS-5B surface-search radar; G/H band; as of 2004; Racal-Decca surface-search radar; I band
- Armament: as built; 1 × 3 in (76 mm) gun; 2 × single 40 mm AA guns; 2 × single 20 mm AA guns; as KRI Rakata; 1 × 3 in (76 mm) gun; 2 × single 40 mm AA guns; 2 × twin 25 mm AA guns

USS Menominee (AT-73) was a Navajo-class fleet tug constructed for the United States Navy during World War II. Her purpose was to aid ships, usually by towing, on the high seas or in combat or post-combat areas, plus "other duties as assigned." During World War II she was assigned to the Asiatic-Pacific Theater where she participated in four campaigns earning four battle stars.

== Description ==
Menominee was laid down 27 September 1941, at United Engineering Co. in San Francisco and launched on 14 February 1942. She was commissioned 25 September 1942.

== Decommission and sale ==
After the war, Menominee sailed for home. In Portland on 15 November 1946, she was decommissioned and entered the Pacific Reserve Fleet. She was struck from the Naval Register 1 November 1959, and transferred to Indonesia on 26 January 1961 as part of the Military Assistance Program. She served in Indonesia as Rakata (928). While in Indonesian service, the Oerlikon 20 mm cannons located in bridge wings were replaced with 2M-3 twin 25 mm cannons of Soviet origin. In the 1980s, her pennant number were changed to 922. As of 2004, the ship was mostly used as patrol ship. Rakata was sunk as target by KRI Nanggala in a joint exercise in Indian Ocean between 8 April and 2 May 2004.
