= United Engineering Co. =

American shipbuilding and repair yard

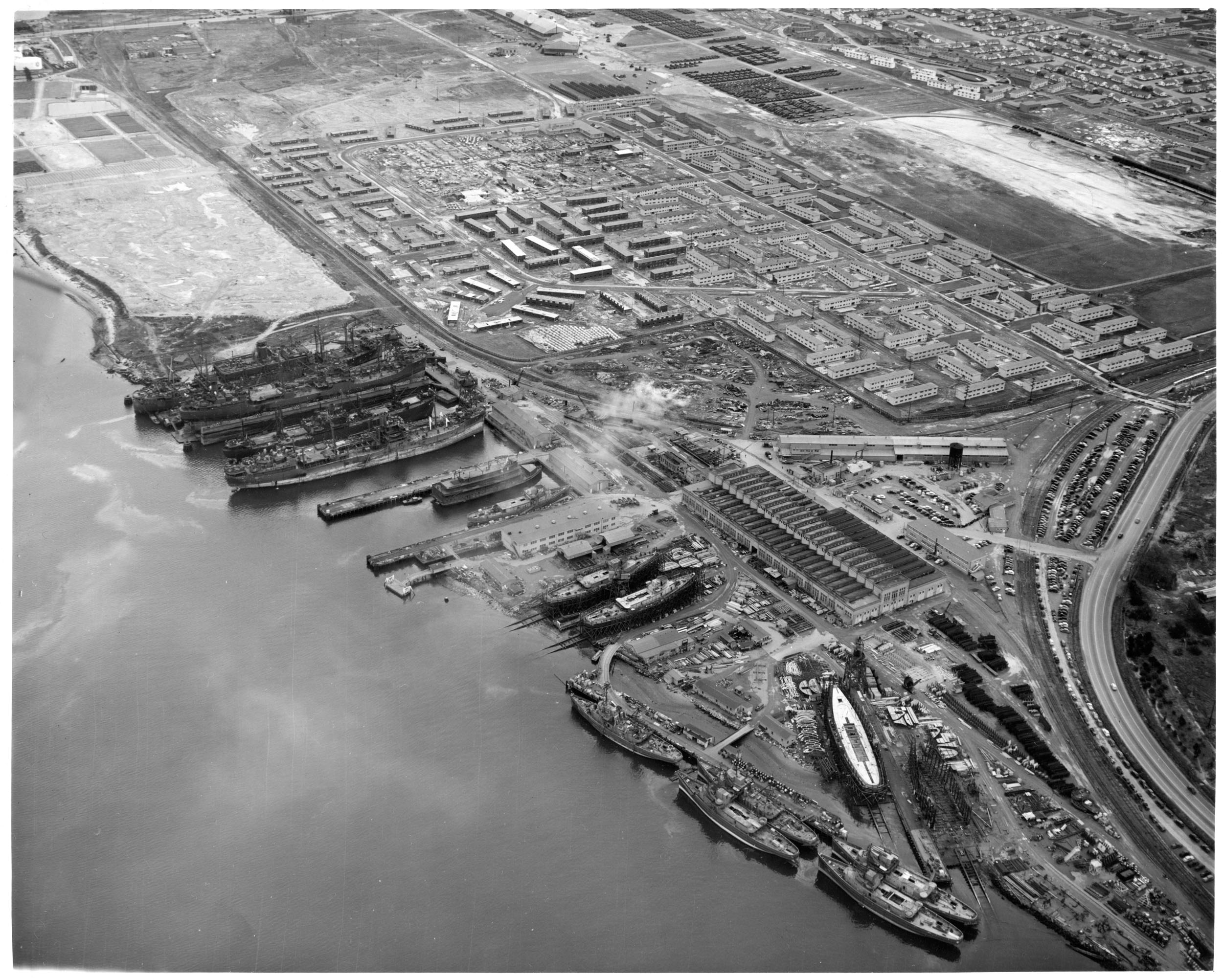
United Engineering yard in January 1944 building fleet tugs

United Engineering Co. (incorporated 10 October 1917, about six months after the sale of the predecessor company United Engineering Works to the Bethlehem Shipbuilding Corporation where it became their Alameda Works), in Alameda, California, was a shipbuilding and repair yard active during World War II. Located along the Oakland-Alameda Estuary, The yard was established in 1941, before that time, United Engineering owned facilities acquired from the Risdon Iron Works at Steuart and Folsom streets (37.79086°N 122.39025°W) and from T. J. Moynihan & Company the corner of Folsom and Fremont (37.788087°N 122.39365°W), just north-west of where the Oakland bay Bridge would later connect.

== History ==
United Engineering Works traces its history back to 1897.

UEC obtained the rights to build Franco Tosi (Legnano, Italy) four-cycle marine diesel engines in 1919.

In 1940 the shipyard in Alameda was constructed on property previously occupied by repair shops of the Southern Pacific Railroad.

Among its many activities, United Engineering built 21 oceangoing tugs for the U.S. Navy.

The facilities that made up United Engineering were built by various interests from 1910–1915, and were first used for building the Red Cars of the extensive East Bay Electric Lines of the Southern Pacific company. They were expanded and converted to shipyard use from 1941-1945. During both periods of its history, the facility was one of Alameda's largest employers and played an important economic and social role in the city.

The facilities' shipbuilding use declined after World War II, and as of 2001, seventeen of its buildings remained on the site. Located at 2900 Main Street in Alameda, they were host to a ship repair yard and 44 smaller tenants. The yard's history has been documented by the Historic American Engineering Record as United Engineering Company Shipyard, survey number HAER CA-295.

In May 1946 United Engineering merged with the maintenance division of the Matson Navigation Company.

- 8 of 29 Cherokee-class tugboats
  - Menominee (ATF-73) ... Ute (ATF-76)
  - Chickasaw (ATF-83) ... Mataco (ATF-86)
- 13 of 36 Abnaki-class tugboats
  - Molala (ATF-106) ... Wenatchee (ATF-118)

By 1953 the yard was part of Todd Shipyards San Francisco Division.

== In the press ==
Date	Topic	Ref
Jan 1921	overhaul of the Annie Johnson by "shifting a portable shipbuilding plant" to pier 46 (37.78026°N 122.3867996°W)	
Mar 21	new equipment, machine shop picture	
Apr 21	discussion of alterations made to license-built Tosi diesel engines	
Oct 21	Plans to convert 8800dwt ships from steam to twin direct-drive 6-cyl. Tosi diesels	

== See also ==
- Moore Dry Dock Company § Shipbuilding in Oakland and Alameda
- Naval Air Station Alameda — nearby airfield
- Charleston Shipbuilding and Drydock Company of South Carolina, built most of the remaining tugs of the classes
