= USS Wenatchee (ATF-118) =

Abnaki-class tugboat

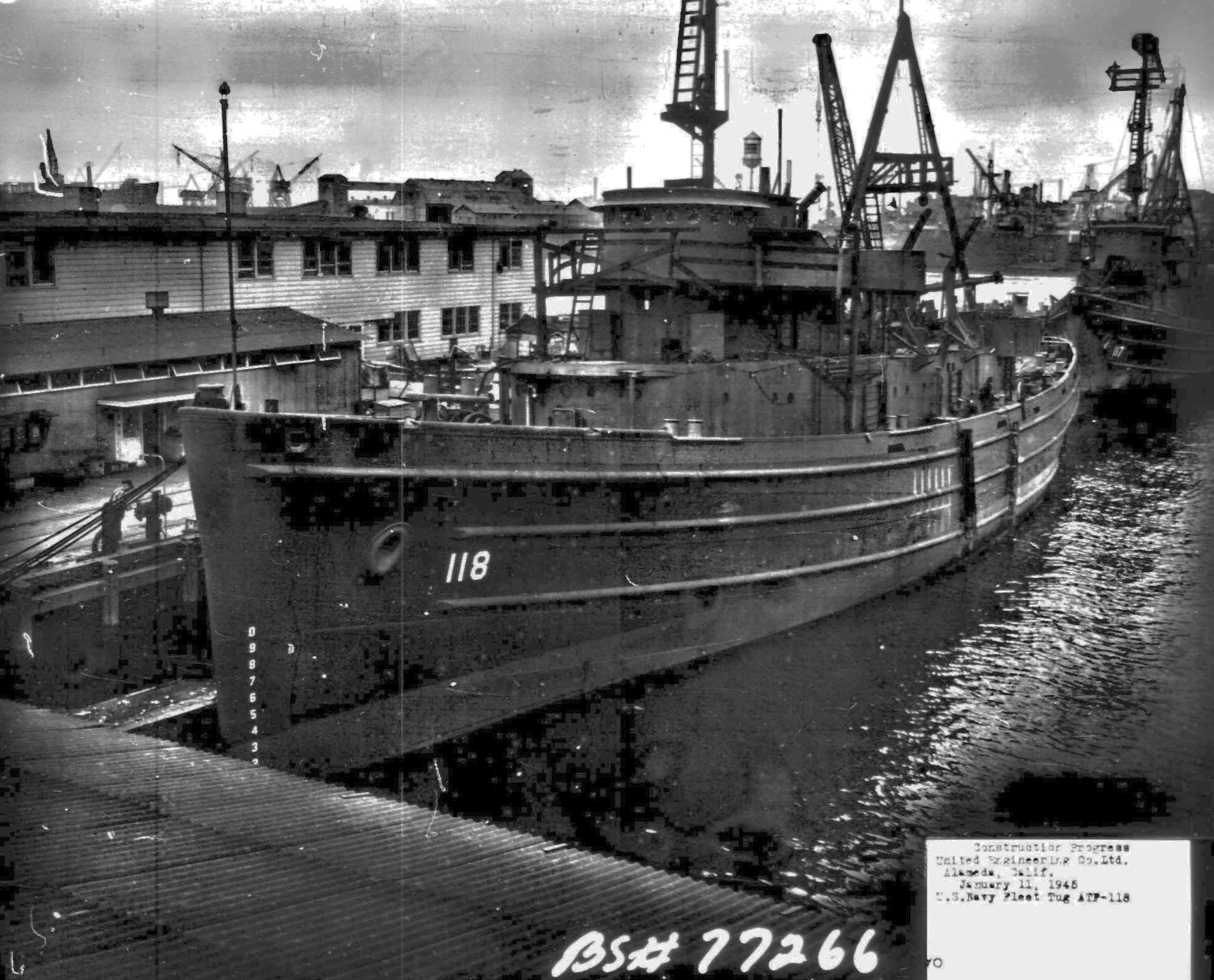
- USS Wenatchee

History

United States
- Name: Wenatchee
- Namesake: Wenatchee
- Builder: United Engineering Co.
- Laid down: 12 January 1944
- Launched: 7 September 1944
- Sponsored by: Mrs. Hart A. Aaron
- Commissioned: 24 March 1945
- Decommissioned: 19 May 1947
- Reclassified: ATF-118, 1944
- Stricken: 1 September 1962
- Identification: Callsign: NFKQ; Hull number: AT-118
- Honours and awards: See Awards

General characteristics
- Class & type: Abnaki-class tugboat
- Displacement: 1,589 t (1,564 long tons), standard; 1,675 t (1,649 long tons), full
- Length: 205 ft 0 in (62.48 m)
- Beam: 38 ft 6 in (11.73 m)
- Draft: 15 ft 4 in (4.67 m)
- Installed power: 1 × shaft; 3,600 shp (2,700 kW)
- Propulsion: 4 × General Motors 12-278A diesel engines; 4 × General Electric generators; 3 × General Motors 3-268A auxiliary services engines
- Speed: 16.5 knots (30.6 km/h; 19.0 mph)
- Range: 15,000 nmi (28,000 km; 17,000 mi) at 8 knots (15 km/h; 9.2 mph)
- Complement: 85 officers and enlisted
- Armament: 1 × single 3"/50 caliber gun; 2 × twin Bofors 40 mm guns; 2 × single Oerlikon 20 mm cannons

USS Wenatchee (ATF-118) was an Abnaki-class tugboat during the World War II. Her namesake was a tribe of Indians of the Salishan language group, who lived in the area that is now central Washington state, principally around Lake Chelan.

== Design and description ==
The ship displaced 1,589 tonnes (1,564 long tons) at standard load and 1,675 tonnes (1,649 long tons) at deep load The ship measured 205 feet (62.5 m) long overall with a beam of 38 feet 6 inches (11.7 m). It had a draft of 15 feet 4 inches (4.7 m). The ship's complement consisted of 85 officers and ratings.

The ship had two General Motors 12-278A diesel engines, one shaft. The engines produced a total of 3,600 shaft horsepower (2,700 kW) and gave a maximum speed of 16.5 knots (30.6 km/h; 19.0 mph). It carried a maximum of 10 tonnes (10 long tons) of fuel oil that gave it a range of 15,000 nmi (28,000 km; 17,000 mi) at 8 knots (15 km/h; 9.2 mph).

The Abnaki class was armed with a 3"/50 caliber gun anti-aircraft gun, two single-mount Oerlikon 20 mm cannon and two twin-gun mounts for Bofors 40 mm gun.

== Construction and career ==
The ship was built at the United Engineering Co. at Alameda, California. She was laid down on 12 January 1944 and launched on 7 September 1944. The ship was commissioned on 24 March 1945. She was re-designated as ATF-118 on 15 May 1944.

Wenatchee conducted her shakedown training in the San Pedro-San Diego-San Francisco area, before departing the west coast on 15 May, bound for the Hawaiian Islands. Reaching Pearl Harbor on 30 May, the fleet tug remained there through mid-June and then sailed for the Marshalls. She reached Eniwetok on 5 July.

The fleet tug performed ocean towing and screening duties supporting the 3rd Fleet's drive against the Japanese homeland and, after hostilities ended, participated in the initial occupation of Japan. She was present in Tokyo Bay on 2 September, the day of Japan's formal surrender. That autumn, she engaged in salvage work at the former Japanese naval base at Yokosuka.

Wenatchee operated there through the end of 1945 and into the following year, finally departing that port in company with Conserver (ARS-39) on 20 February 1946, bound for Hawaiian waters. Reaching Pearl Harbor on 3 March, Wenatchee stayed there for over a month before she sailed for Bikini Atoll on 13 April to take part in Operation Crossroads.

As part of Task Unit 1.8.1, a repair and service unit, Wenatchee supported the atomic test operations there into the summer and then left Kwajalein on 20 August and headed for Pearl Harbor, reaching that port on 5 September. The fleet tug subsequently towed AFDB-7 from Pearl Harbor to San Francisco, reaching the west coast in late October.

After transiting the Panama Canal in mid-December and reporting for duty with Service Force, Atlantic Fleet, Wenatchee reached New Orleans on 21 January 1947. Shifting to Orange, Texas, in mid-March, the fleet tug was decommissioned and placed in reserve there on 19 May 1947.

Struck from the Navy list on 1 September 1962, the ship was transferred to the Maritime Administration for lay up and preservation. Berthed at Beaumont, Texas, she remained there into the late 1970s, awaiting final disposition.

== Awards ==
The ship earned 1 battle star throughout her career.

- China Service Medal
- American Campaign Medal
- Asiatic-Pacific Campaign Medal (1 battle star)
- World War II Victory Medal
- Navy Occupation Service Medal (with Asia clasp)
- Philippines Liberation Medal
