= MV Tuzla =

Turkish cargo ship

History
- Name: Tuzla
- Owner: Turkey (Cayeli Shipping)
- Port of registry: Vanuatu
- Launched: 29 March 1980
- Completed: 1980
- Identification: IMO number: 7920364; MMSI number: 577537000; Call sign: YJXF2

General characteristics
- Type: General Cargo ship
- Tonnage: 2,485 GT
- Length: 86 m (282 ft 2 in)
- Beam: 14 m (45 ft 11 in)

MV Tuzla is a Turkish-owned, Vanuatu-flagged general cargo ship that was damaged by a missile strike during the 2022 Russian invasion of Ukraine. Tuzla has a gross tonnage of 2,485 tons, and is 86 metres (282 ft) long and 14 metres (46 ft) wide.

== History ==
Tuzla was built in 1980 and is owned by the Istanbul-based company Cayeli Shipping. The ship was trapped in the Dnipro river at the port of Kherson at the outset of the Russian invasion of Ukraine in February 2022. For roughly a year, the ship remained there in a laid-up condition with its AIS turned off.

On 24 January 2023, the Russian Army repeatedly shelled Kherson. According to the ship's master, at around 2100 local time, Tuzla was struck in the bridge by a missile or artillery, severely damaging the ship and starting a fire that burned out the bridge. Another Turkish ship, the Ferahnaz, was also damaged, but to a much lesser degree.
