= KRI Cakra =

Indonesian Navy Cakra-class submarine

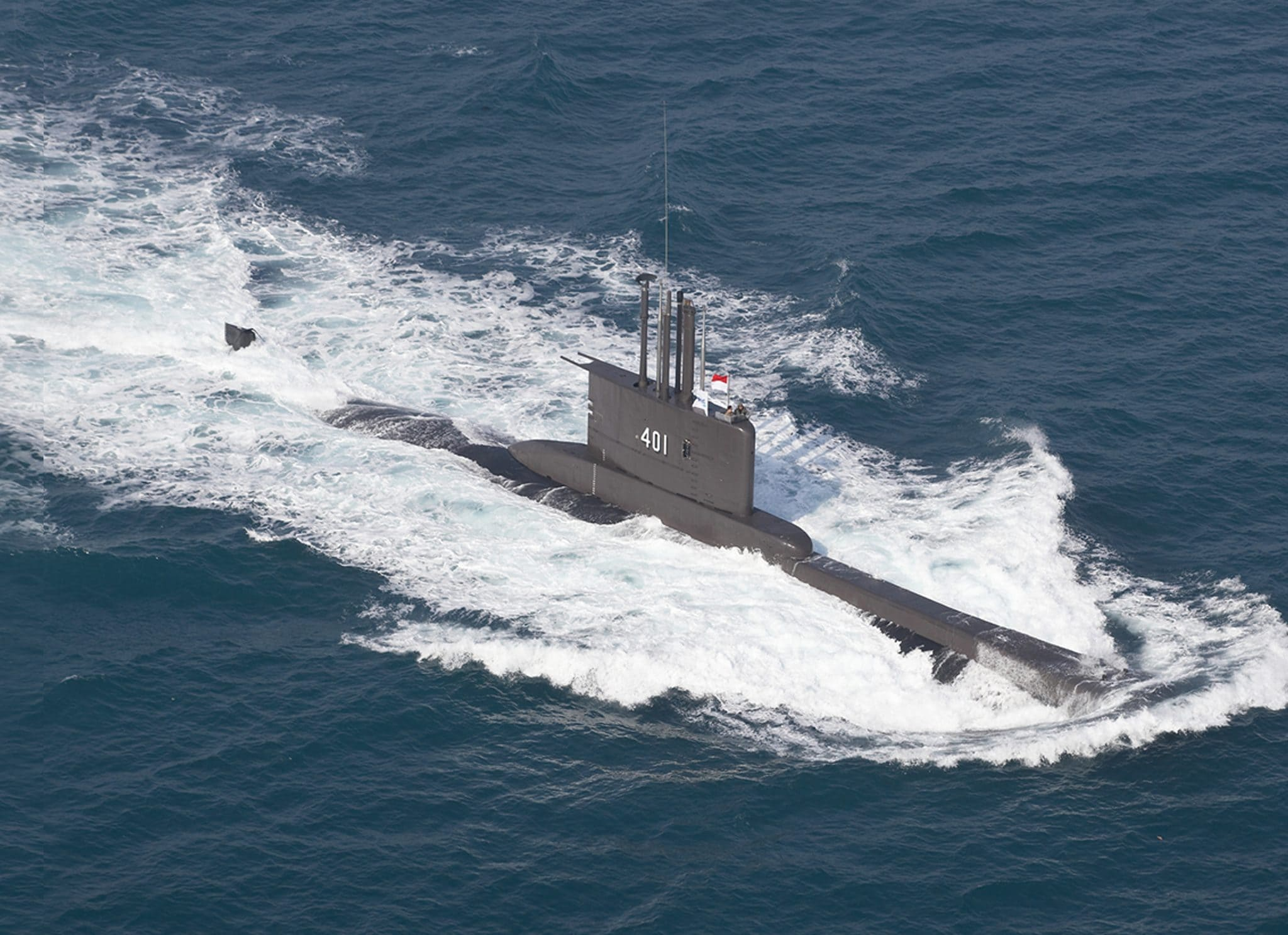
- KRI Cakra at sea

History

Indonesia
- Name: KRI Cakra
- Namesake: Weapon of Batara Wisnu
- Ordered: 2 April 1977
- Builder: Howaldtswerke-Deutsche Werft
- Laid down: 25 November 1977
- Completed: 18 March 1981
- Identification: 401
- Status: Active

General characteristics
- Class & type: Cakra-class attack submarine
- Displacement: 1,285 tons surfaced; 1,390 tons dived
- Length: 59.5 m (195 ft 3 in)
- Beam: 6.2 m (20 ft 4 in)
- Draft: 5.4 m (17 ft 9 in)
- Propulsion: 4 x MTU 12V493 AZ80 GA31L diesel engines rated at 1.8 MW (2,400 hp); 4 x Siemens alternators rated at 2,300 hp (1.7 MW); 1 x Siemens motor rated at 3.4 MW (4,600 hp); 1 x shaft
- Speed: 11 knots (20 km/h; 13 mph) surfaced; 21.5 knots (39.8 km/h; 24.7 mph) submerged
- Range: 8,200 nmi (15,200 km; 9,400 mi) at 8 kn (15 km/h; 9.2 mph)
- Endurance: 50 days
- Test depth: 240 m (790 ft)
- Crew: 6 officers, 28 enlisted
- Sensors & processing systems: Signaal Sinbad weapons control system; Thomson-CSF Calypso, I-band surface search radar; Atlas Elektronik CSU 3-2 active/passive search and attack sonar; PRS-3/4 passive ranging
- Electronic warfare & decoys: ESM: Thomson-CSF DR2000U
- Armament: 8 × 533 mm (21 in) bow tubes; 14 x AEG SUT torpedoes

KRI Cakra (401) is the lead vessel of the two-member Cakra class of diesel-electric attack submarines operated by the Indonesian Navy.

== Name ==
The vessel is named after the Cakra, a weapon in the form of a wheel with teeth resembling spearheads that was owned by Batara Wisnu, a recurring character in wayang puppet theatre.

== Construction ==
KRI Cakra was ordered on 2 April 1977, laid down on 25 November 1977 and completed on 18 March 1981. The vessel was designed by Ingenieurkontor Lübeck of Lübeck, constructed by Howaldtswerke-Deutsche Werft of Kiel, and sold by Ferrostaal of Essen – all acting together as a West German consortium.

== Operational history ==
The two Cakra-class submarines, Cakra and Nanggala, were the only active submarines in the Indonesian Navy between the decommissioning of KRI Pasopati in 1994 and the commissioning of KRI Nagapasa in 2017.

Both Cakra-class vessels underwent major refits at HDW spanning three years from 1986 to 1989. Cakra was refitted again at Surabaya from 1993 to April 1997, including replacement batteries and updated Sinbad TFCS.

Cakra began another refit at Daewoo Shipyard, South Korea in 2004. It was completed in 2005. Work is reported to have included new batteries, overhaul of engines and modernisation of the combat system.

== See also ==
- List of active Indonesian Navy ships
