= Cakra-class submarine =

Submarine class

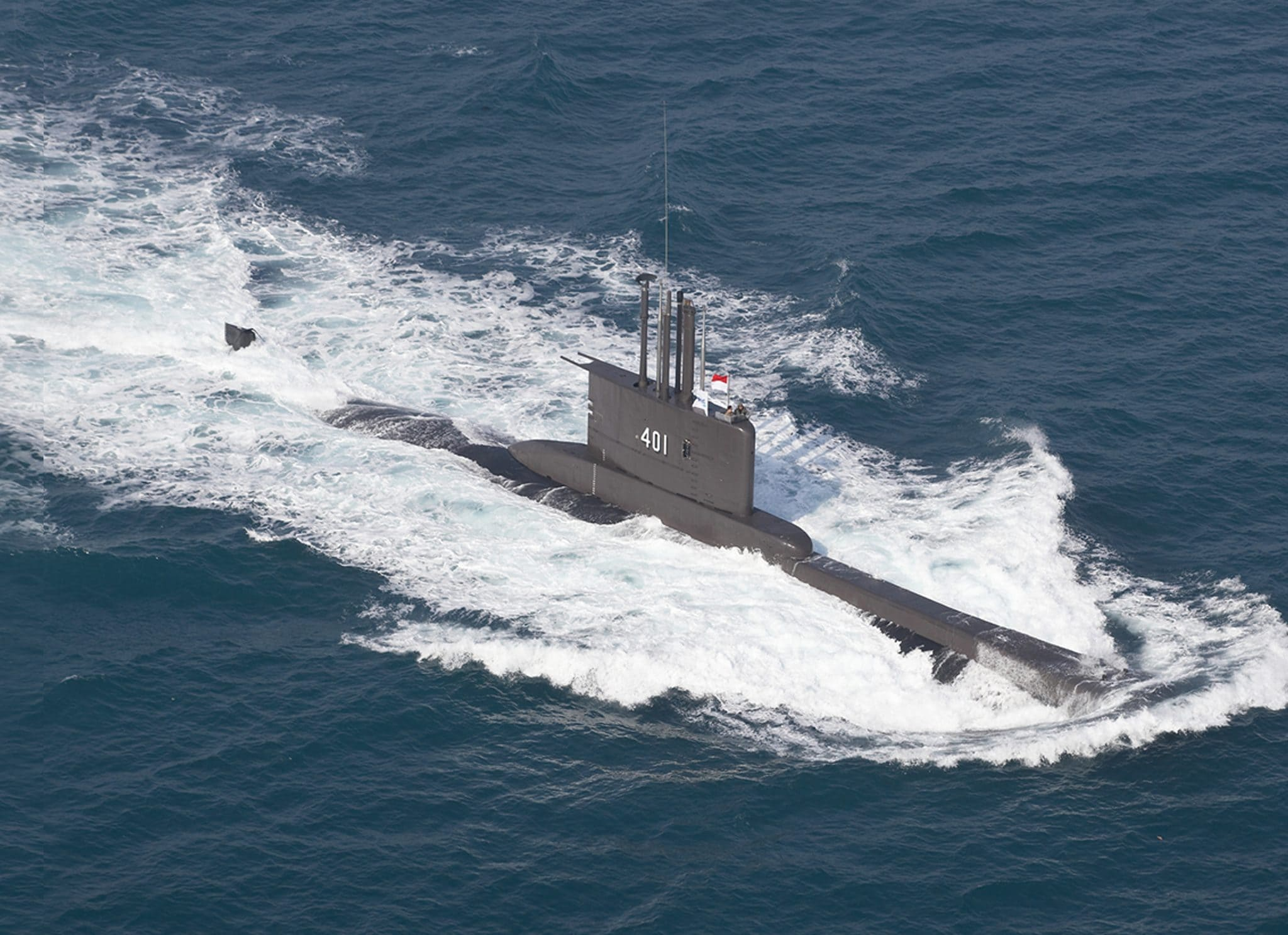
- KRI Cakra (401)

Class overview
- Name: Cakra class
- Builders: Howaldtswerke-Deutsche Werft
- Operators: Indonesian Navy
- Preceded by: Whiskey class
- Succeeded by: Nagapasa class
- Built: 1977–1981
- In commission: 1981–present
- Completed: 2
- Active: 1
- Lost: 1

General characteristics
- Type: Attack submarine
- Displacement: 1,285 tons surfaced; 1,390 tons submerged
- Length: 59.5 m (195 ft 3 in)
- Beam: 6.2 m (20 ft 4 in)
- Draft: 5.4 m (17 ft 9 in)
- Propulsion: 4 x MTU 12V493 AZ80 GA31L diesel engines rated at 1.8 MW (2,400 hp); 4 x Siemens alternators rated at 2,300 hp (1.7 MW); 1 x Siemens motor rated at 3.4 MW (4,600 hp); 1 x shaft
- Speed: 11 knots (20 km/h; 13 mph) surfaced; 21.5 knots (39.8 km/h; 24.7 mph) submerged
- Range: 8,200 nmi (15,200 km; 9,400 mi) at 8 kn (15 km/h; 9.2 mph)
- Endurance: 50 days
- Test depth: 240 m (790 ft)
- Complement: 33
- Sensors & processing systems: Signaal Sinbad weapons control system; Thomson-CSF Calypso, I-band surface search radar; Atlas Elektronik CSU 3-2 active/passive search and attack sonar; PRS-3/4 passive ranging
- Electronic warfare & decoys: ESM : Thomson-CSF DR2000U
- Armament: 8 × 533 mm (21 in) bow tubes; 14 x AEG SUT torpedoes

The Cakra class (Cakra read "chakra" which is a Sanskrit derived word referring to "wheel") is a class of two Type 209/1300 attack submarines developed by Howaldtswerke-Deutsche Werft of Germany that were bought and commissioned by the Indonesian Navy in the 1980s. The second member of the class, KRI Nanggala sank in 2021 with all hands during an exercise. The lead submarine, KRI Cakra, remains in service.

== Development ==
The Cakra-class submarines were ordered on 2 April 1977, designed by Ingenieurkontor Lübeck of Lübeck, constructed by Howaldtswerke-Deutsche Werft of Kiel, and sold by Ferrostaal of Essen – all acting together as a West German consortium. They were laid down on 25 November 1977 and March 1978, and completed on 18 March 1981 and 6 July 1981, respectively. There were plans to build two more boats of the same class but eventually nothing came of it.

On 25 September 1997, Indonesia took over two ex-German Type 206 submarines with plans to refit them, followed by three others. Funds ran out in June 1998 and the whole project was then cancelled. New plans to acquire submarines from South Korea were announced in October 2003. Then it was revealed that the intended procurement was an improved Jang Bogo-class submarine, the members of which are now in service as the Nagapasa class.

== Design ==
The Cakra-class submarines have high capacity batteries with GRP lead–acid cells and battery cooling supplied by Wilhelm Hagen AG.

=== Modernization ===
The Cakra-class underwent major refits at HDW spanning three years from 1986 to 1989. These refits were expensive and lengthy and may have discouraged further orders at that time. Cakra was refitted again at Surabaya from 1993 to April 1997, including replacement batteries and updated Sinbad TFCS. Nanggala received a similar refit from October 1997 to mid-1999.

Cakra began another refit at Daewoo Shipyard, South Korea in 2004. It was completed in 2005. Work is reported to have included new batteries, overhaul of engines and modernisation of the combat system. A similar refit of Nanggala was completed in early 2012.

== Vessels in class ==
Name	Hull number	Builder	Ordered	Laid down	Launched	Commissioned	Status
Cakra	401	Howaldtswerke	2 April 1977	25 November 1977	10 September 1980	18 March 1981	In active service
Nanggala	402	Howaldtswerke	2 April 1977	March 1978	10 September 1980	6 July 1981	Went missing on 21 April 2021 and declared sunk on 24 April, following the retrieval of objects believed to have been parts of the submarine, including a torpedo straightener. Found on the 25th April, all hands lost.

== Operational history ==
In 1999–2000, relations between Indonesia and Australia were tense following a referendum in East Timor, in which the East Timorese population voted for independence from Indonesia.

During the hiatus between the announcement of the referendum result and its ratification and withdrawal by Indonesia, an international peacekeeping force for East Timor, named INTERFET, was announced. A Royal Australian Navy transport vessel, HMAS Kanimbla, was to serve as an INTERFET command post. As Kanimbla approached the coast of East Timor, it entered what were technically still Indonesian waters.

An Indonesian Cakra-class submarine was conducting a routine patrol duties in the Timor Sea, when its sonar detected several unidentified surface ships moving towards Dili. The submarine's commander directed the ship to submerge to periscope depth. The unidentified surface ships turned out to be a convoy of three ships: Kanimbla and two Royal New Zealand Navy frigates. The submarine captain ordered preparations for the firing of torpedoes. While the New Zealand frigate crews were aware of the presence of a submarine, they were unable to determine its exact position. At that point, the commander of Kanimbla communicated with the Australian government regarding the situation, and Canberra contacted Jakarta to request permission for the INTERFET vessels to enter Indonesian waters and set course to Dili. The submarine was ordered not to obstruct the convoy. It then surfaced and shadowed the convoy for the rest of its voyage.

=== Sinking of Nanggala ===
On 21 April 2021, the Indonesian Navy announced that Nanggala, with 53 sailors on board, had failed to report after a SUT torpedo live fire exercise in the Bali Sea. The Indonesian government announced that a search party had been deployed, and that they had requested the assistance of the governments of Singapore and Australia to aid in the search. US Navy and Indian Navy also responded. India dispatched its DSRV from Vishakhapatnam and United States stated it was sending airborne assets.

On 24 April, Indonesia officially declared that the submarine had sunk, following the retrieval of objects believed to have been parts of Nanggala, including a torpedo straightener and prayer mats. "With the authentic evidence we found believed to be from the submarine, we have now moved from the sub miss phase to sub sunk", Navy Chief Yudo Margono has said. He also stated that scans have detected the submarine 850 metres (2,790 ft) deep, significantly below the 500 metres (1,600 ft) Nanggala was able to withstand. On 25 April, Nanggala was found, split into three parts, and the entire crew of 53 people were confirmed dead. "Based on the evidence, it can be stated that the KRI Nanggala has sunk and all of its crew have died," Marshal Hadi Tjahjanto told reporters.

== See also ==
- List of active Indonesian Navy ships
- Equipment of the Indonesian Navy

== Bibliography ==
- Gardiner, Robert; Chumbley, Stephen, eds. (1995). Conway's All the World's Fighting Ships 1947–1995. Annapolis, Maryland, US: Naval Institute Press. ISBN 1-55750-132-7.
- Saunders, Stephen, ed. (2009). Jane's Fighting Ships 2009–2010. Jane's Information Group. ISBN 9780710628886.
