= Bali Sea =

Indonesian sea between Bali and Kangean Islands

- Laut Bali (Indonesian)
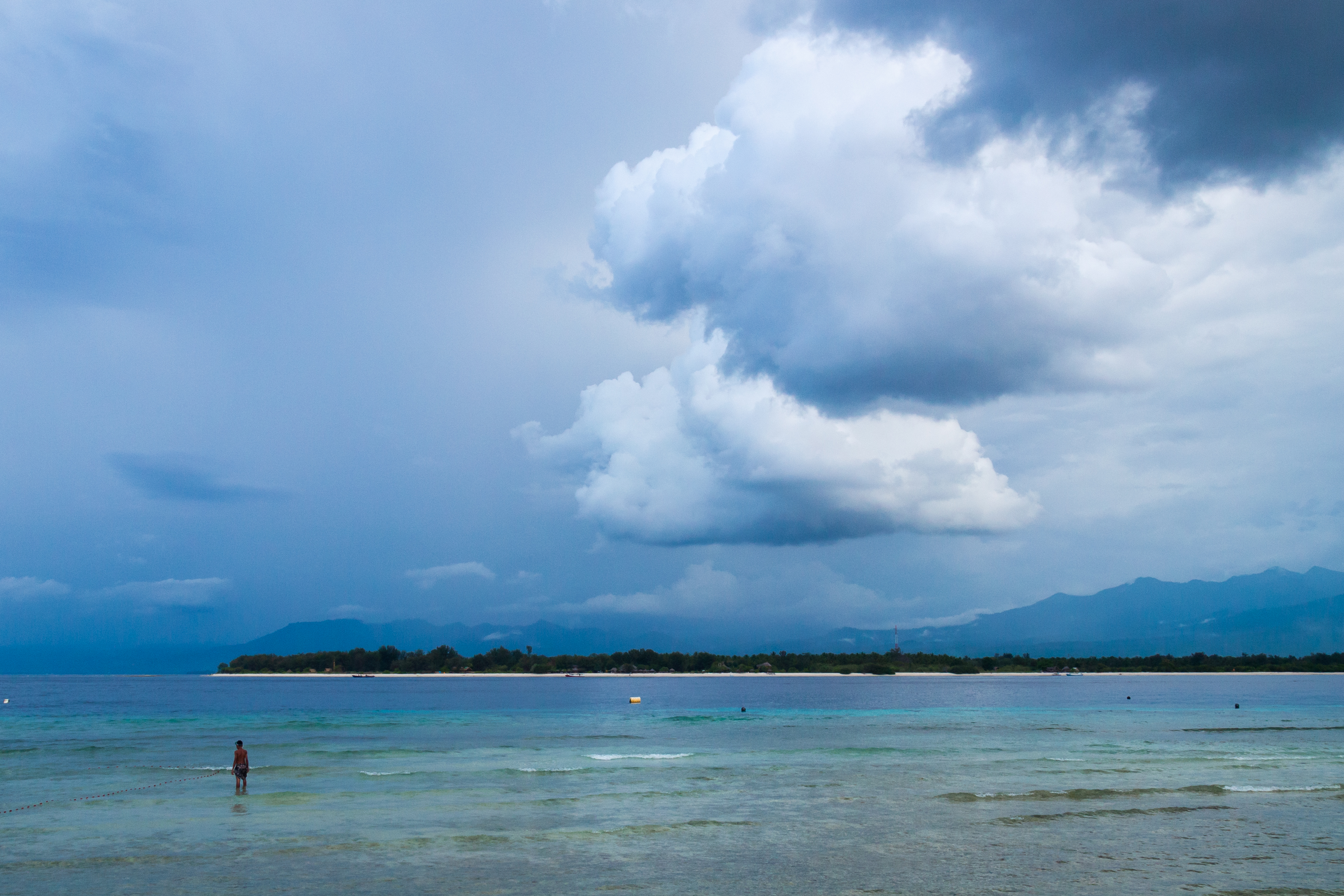
- Bali Sea near Lombok

- Location within Indonesia
- Coordinates: 7°30′S 115°30′E
- Type: Sea
- Basin countries: Indonesia
- Surface area: 45,000 km^{2} (17,000 sq mi)

The Bali Sea (Indonesian: Laut Bali, Balinese: ᬲᭂᬕᬭᬩᬮᬶ, romanized: Segara Bali) is the body of water north of the island of Bali and south of Kangean Island in Indonesia. The sea forms the south-west part of the Flores Sea, and the Madura Strait opens into it from the west.

== Geography ==
The Bali Sea is sometimes grouped with the Flores Sea for oceanographic purposes; however, in some nautical charts, Bali Sea is written as a distinct sea for navigation. The sea has an area of 45,000 km^{2} (17,000 sq mi) and a maximum depth of 1,590 m (5,217 ft).

=== Extent ===
The International Hydrographic Organization (IHO) defines the Bali Sea as being one of the waters of the East Indian Archipelago. The IHO defines its limits as follows:

On the North. A line from the Western Paternoster Island to the East point of Sepandjang and thence through this island to the West point of Gedeh Bay on the South coast of Kangean (7°01′S 115°18′E).

On the West. A line from the West point of Gedeh Bay, Kangean Island, to Tg Sedano, the Northeast extreme of Java and down the East coast to Tg Bantenan, the Southeast extreme of the island.

On the South. A line from Tanjong Banenan through the Southern points of Balt [sic] and Noesa Islands to Tanjong Bt Gendang, the Southwest extreme of Lombok, and its South coast to Tanjong Ringgit the Southeast extreme, thence a line to Tanjong Mangkoen (9°01′S 116°43′E) the Southwest extreme of Soembawa.

On the East. The West and North coasts of Soembawa as far East as Tanjong Sarokaja (8°22′S 117°10′E), thence the Western limit of Flores Sea [A line from Tg Sarokaja to the Western Paternoster island (7°26′S 117°08′E)].

=== Circulation ===
The circulation and mass water properties in Bali Sea are a continuation from Flores Sea to the Java Sea in the north. In oceanographic, Bali Sea is concerned with the Indonesian Throughflow coming from Pacific Ocean to the Indian Ocean, the flow of which are mostly passing through Bali Strait and Lombok Strait.

== Tsunamis ==
In a recorded tsunami history, Bali Sea observed several tsunamis. The 1815 Tambora eruption (scale 7 of Volcanic Explosivity Index) formed tsunamis on 22 September 1815 at coordinate 8.00°S 115.20°E and three years later (8 September 1818) from subsequent volcanic activities at coordinate 7.0°S 117.0°E. Two more tsunamis were recorded in 1857 and 1917 with maximum heights of 3 and 2 meters (9.8 and 6.6 ft) respectively.

== Accidents ==
=== 2021 ===
- On 21 April 2021, an Indonesian navy submarine called KRI Nanggala (402) was reported as missing in waters about 95 km (51 nautical miles) north of Bali during its torpedo drill. Few days later, debris was found within 10 nmi (19 km; 12 mi) of the point of last contact and was believed to have come from the submarine. Nanggala was later declared sunk along with 53 people on board, including 49 crew members, 1 commander, and 3 weapons specialists.

== See also ==
- Geography of Indonesia
