= KRI dr. Soeharso =

Hospital ship built in 2003

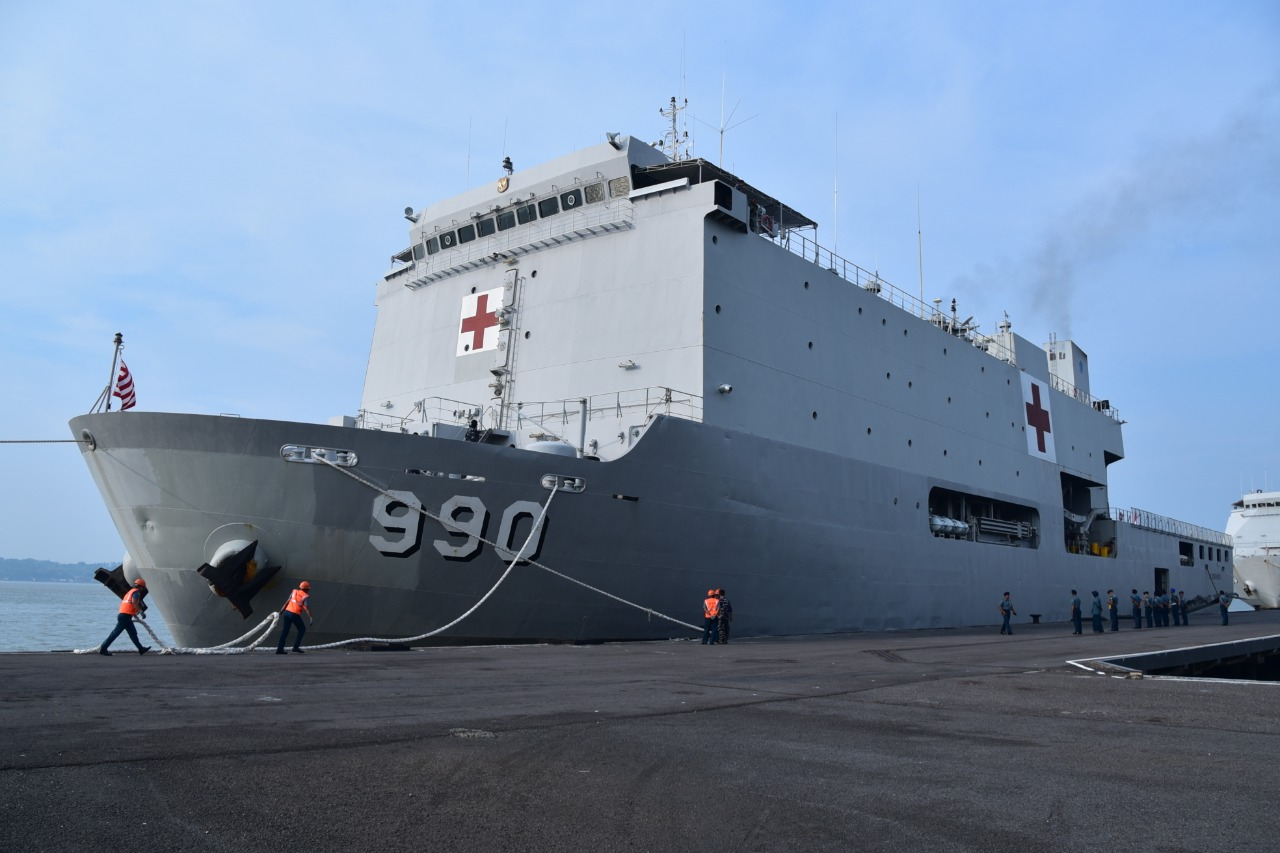
- KRI dr. Soeharso (990) in April 2020

Class overview
- Name: Tanjung Dalpele class
- Operators: Indonesian Navy
- Succeeded by: Makassar class (LPD); Sudirohusodo class (hospital ship)
- Planned: 1
- Completed: 1
- Active: 1

Indonesia
- Name: KRI Tanjung Dalpele
- Namesake: Cape Dalpele, Papua
- Renamed: KRI dr. Soeharso
- Namesake: Suharso
- Builder: Dae Sun Shipbuilders, Pusan, South Korea
- Laid down: 2002
- Launched: 17 May 2003
- Commissioned: September 2003
- Identification: IMO number: 9261372; Pennant number: 990
- Status: In service

General characteristics as built
- Class & type: Hospital ship/landing platform dock
- Displacement: 7,400 t (7,300 long tons) standard; 11,600 t (11,400 long tons) full load
- Length: 122 m (400 ft 3 in)
- Beam: 22 m (72 ft 2 in)
- Draught: 4.9 m (16 ft 1 in)
- Installed power: 3,910 kW (5,250 hp)
- Propulsion: CODAD; 2 × B&W 8L28/32A diesel engines, 2 shafts
- Speed: 15 knots (28 km/h; 17 mph)
- Range: 8,600 nmi (15,900 km; 9,900 mi) at 12 knots (22 km/h; 14 mph)
- Boats & landing craft carried: 2 × LCU-23M landing craft; 2 × LCVPs
- Troops: 13 tanks; 507 troops
- Complement: 126
- Armament: 1 × 57 mm (2.2 in) gun; 1 × twin 40 mm (1.6 in) guns
- Aircraft carried: 2 × Super Puma helicopters
- Aviation facilities: Hangar and helicopter deck

KRI dr. Soeharso is a hospital ship of the Indonesian Navy. It was initially designed and built in 2003 in South Korea as a landing platform dock named KRI Tanjung Dalpele. However, after its launch it was redesignated as a multi-purpose hospital ship. In 2020, dr. Soeharso was used to transport Indonesian crew from cruise ships during the COVID-19 pandemic.

== Design and description ==
As built, Tanjung Dalpele was constructed as a landing platform dock (LPD). The vessel had a standard displacement of 7,400 tonnes (7,300 long tons) and 11,600 t (11,400 long tons) at full load. The Miramar Ship Index has the as built standard displacement as 10,000 tonnes (9,800 long tons). The ship measures 122 metres (400 ft 3 in) long overall with a beam of 22 metres (72 ft 2 in) and a draught of 4.9 metres (16 ft 1 in). The vessel is powered by a combined diesel and diesel (CODAD) system comprising two Burmeister & Wain (B&W) 8L28/32A diesel engines turning two shafts creating 3,910 kilowatts (5,250 hp). The vessel has a maximum speed of 15 knots (28 km/h; 17 mph) and a range of 8,600 nautical miles (15,900 km; 9,900 mi) at 12 knots (22 km/h; 14 mph).

The vessel is equipped with a well deck and is capable of accommodating two LCU-23M landing craft and two landing craft for vehicles and personnel (LCVPs). As an LPD, Tanjung Dalpele had a lift capacity of 13 tanks and 507 troops. The vessel is equipped with hospital facilities (five operating rooms and six polyclinics) and is utilised as a hospital ship by the Indonesian Navy. As a hospital ship the vessel is capable of accepting up to 2,000 patients and has a crew of 126 with 51 medical specialists.

As built, the ship was armed with one 57 mm (2.2 in) gun and twin-mounted 40 mm (1.6 in) guns. The ship has a hangar and helicopter deck at the stern and is capable of operating two Super Puma helicopters.

== Construction and career ==
The contract for the US$35 million ship was signed with Daewoo International in September 2003. The vessel was built by Daesun Shipbuilding at their shipyard in Pusan, South Korea, with the keel being laid in 2002. Named Tanjung Dalpele with pennant number 972, the ship was launched on 17 May 2003 and entered service with the Indonesian Navy in September of that year. In February 2007, Tanjung Dalpele carried the families of the victims of Adam Air Flight KI-574 to the site of the crash for a memorial service.

On 1 August 2007 the ship was changed to a hospital ship, and was renamed KRI dr. Soeharso with the pennant number 990. (Note: Parameswaran says the status was changed in 2008.) In 2016, dr. Soeharso performed its first overseas mission, deploying to Timor-Leste on a medical care mission.

=== 2020 coronavirus pandemic ===
dr. Soeharso picked up 188 Indonesian crew of the cruise ship World Dream in the Durian Strait on 26 February 2020. The vessel took them to Sebaru Kecil Islet and placed under quarantine.

dr. Soeharso evacuated 89 crew of the cruise ship Diamond Princess from Indramayu thermal power plant port, after the crew got health certificate from Japan and flew to Kertajati International Airport. They then used buses to travel to port. The crew underwent a second round of test, in which one of the crew tested positive for COVID-19 and was hospitalized in Jakarta. 68 crew of Diamond Princess disembarked at Sebaru Kecil Islet. World Dream evacuees and Diamond Princess evacuees used separated blocks/buildings.

=== 2026 Flores earthquake ===
Following the 2026 Flores earthquake on 15 August, the ship was deployed to Manggarai to transport 217 Marine Corps personnel and augment medical operations in the affected areas.
