= Battle of Busan =

Naval battle between Korea and Japan

- Part of Imjin War
| Date | 1st day, 9th month of 1592 |
| Location | Off coast of Busan, Korea |
| Result | Joseon victory |

Belligerents
| Joseon navy | Japanese navy |

Commanders and leaders
| Yi Sun-sin; Wŏn Kyun; Yi Ŏkki; Chŏng Un †; Kwŏn Chun; Song Hŭirip; Kim Wan; Yi Yŏngnam; Eo Yeong-dam; Yi Ŏllyang | Wakisaka Yasuharu; Kuki Yoshitaka; Tōdō Takatora; Kato Yoshiaki |

Strength
| 166 vessels: 74 Panokseon; 92 hyeopseon | 470 vessels |

Casualties and losses
| No ships lost 6 killed (including Officer Chŏng); 25 wounded few Panokseon damaged | 128 warships destroyed |

The Battle of Busan (Korean: 부산포 해전; Hanja: 釜山浦 海戰), also called Battle of Pusanpo or Battle of Busan Bay, was a 1592 naval bombardment of anchored Japanese ships at Busan. Korean admiral Yi Sun-sin managed to destroy over 100 Japanese ships and retreated with minimal casualties. It was a naval engagement that took place on the 1st day, 9th month of 1592 (Korean calendar) during the first phase of the Japanese invasions of Korea. It was a Korean surprise attack on the fleet of Toyotomi Hideyoshi stationed at Busan, and its main objective was to recapture Busan, which would thoroughly cutoff the supply line of the Japanese army. In this battle, officer Chŏng Un and six soldiers died, the Japanese lost over 100 ships, and the Japanese military lost control of the seas around the Joseon.

== Background ==
After Korean Admiral Yi Sun-sin's fleet decisively defeated the Japanese in the Battle of Hansando on July 8, the Japanese had to change their war strategy. Their strategy was to deliver more land forces and supplies by sea to the northern part of the Korean peninsula and then they would march into Ming China. With the failure of this strategy, Japanese troops in the northern provinces of Joseon Korea had to suffer from starvation and shortages of supplies. To invade China, they needed to secure war supply routes. The alternate plan was to advance troops and supplies by roads, but this route was blocked by the Uibyeong ("Righteous Army"). Many Korean civilians and Buddhist monks formed a voluntary army and attacked Japanese troops.

== Formation of the united Joseon fleet ==
After the Battle of Hansan Island, which Yi Sun-sin's navy won against the Japanese navy around mid-July, they remained silent for nearly a month. In mid-August Kato Yoshiaki's army, Kimura's army, and Okamoto's army retreated from Hanyang, the later capital of Joseon, to Gyeongsang Province. Around this time, most of the Japanese troops retreated to Gimhae to secure their munitions. In addition, following the Battle of Hansan Island, the Japanese navy retreated to Busan and focused on protecting and rebuilding their positions. Commander Yi sent spy ships to Busan port and found out there were about 470 warships there. Commander Yi believed that the Japanese were retreating to their country, so Gyeongsang Province Governor (慶尙右水營) Kim Su requested that Commander Yi block their sea route. Therefore, Commander Yi with Commanders Wŏn Kyun and Yi Ŏkki united their fleets, for a total of 166 vessels. On their way to Busan, Commander Yi defeated 24 Japanese ships at Seopyeongpo (西平浦), at the Battle of Dadaejin (多大浦), and at Jeolyoungdo (絶影島). The combined Joseon fleet defeated the Japanese navy repeatedly, largely as a result of their well-trained sailors and the Joseon ships' medium- and long-range cannons.

== Battle of Busanpo ==
Off the coast of Busan, the united Joseon fleet realized that the Japanese navy had readied their ships for battle, and the Japanese army had stationed themselves around the shoreline. The united Joseon fleet assembled in the Jangsajin (長蛇陣), or "Long Snake" formation, with many ships advancing in a line, and attacked straight into the Japanese fleet. Overwhelmed by the Joseon fleet, the Japanese navy abandoned their ships and fled to the coast where their army was stationed. The Japanese army and navy joined their forces and attacked the Joseon fleet from the nearby hills in desperation. The Joseon fleet shot arrows from their ships to defend and restrict their attacks and, in the meantime, concentrated on their cannon fire on destroying Japanese vessels. The Korean ships fired on the Japanese fleet and burned them using fire arrows while the Japanese fired on them from above in their forts. Even with cannons captured at Busan, the Japanese did little damage to the Korean warships. By the time the day had ended, 128 Japanese ships had been destroyed. Yi Sun-sin gave orders to withdraw, ending the battle.

== Comparisons ==
In terms of size, the Joseon ships were one-third that of Japanese ships. Although commander Yi destroyed over 100 ships, he did not order his soldiers to pursue the Japanese on shore, probably because he recognized that close hand-to-hand combat skills of the Joseon were significantly weaker than those of the samurai. In addition, the Joseon soldiers were exhausted from long sea travel and battle, and would have been heavily outnumbered on land. Up to that point, Commander Yi had not fought with numbers of soldiers, but rather with ships and cannons. Yi reinforced disadvantages in number of soldiers with heavy use of firearms. The Japanese also had a well-trained cavalry, which was another aspect the Joseon army lacked. In the Joseon fleet, Yi lost one of his cherished officers, by the name of Woon.

== Impact ==
Yi Sun-sin originally intended to destroy all the remaining Japanese ships, however, he realized that doing so would effectively trap the Japanese soldiers on the Korean Peninsula, where they would travel inland and slaughter the natives. Therefore, Yi left a small number of Japanese ships unharmed and withdrew his navy to resupply. And just as Yi suspected, under the cover of darkness, the remaining Japanese soldiers boarded their remaining ships and retreated.

After this battle, the Japanese forces lost the control of the sea. The devastating blow dealt to the Japanese fleet isolated their armies in Korea and cut them off from their home bases. Since the Japanese forces realized the importance of the defensive lines of Busan Bay to secure the supply line, they tried to bring the west area of Busan under their control, when the Joseon navy came. This attempt led to the Battle of Jinju in October 1592, in which General Kim Si-min triumphed over 20,000 Japanese troops, and the Siege of Jinju in June 1593, in which Japanese forces finally captured the castle in Jinju.

== Arguments about the result of the battle ==
Korean, Japanese, British, and American historians say that the Joseon navy won this battle and the Japanese military lost control of the seas around the Joseon. Chester W. Nimitz also referred to the battle as a Joseon decisive victory and resulted in the Japanese military losing control of the seas.

For example, the Veritable Records of the Joseon Dynasty described this battle as a strategic failure.

Some Japanese argued that the result was a strategic victory of Japan, with references to the official history of the Joseon and referencing the military mails between Japanese Daimyo. They argue that the Korean navy, which had repeatedly made sorties until now, ceased conspicuous activities after this battle until the February of the following year. They argue that the Japanese supply routes were never cut off, mentioning that this was the first and last time that Yi Sun-sin appeared in Busan.

However, in dozens of the sources like Joseon's official compendium (李忠武公全書) which is also the primary historical source written by the bureaucrats of the Korean government, Nanjung ilgi, military reports (which were written by on-scene commander in Busan on the spot), British history books, and American history books, it was recorded as the Korean navy decisively defeating the Japanese navy.

Chester W. Nimitz who played a major role in the naval history of World War II as Commander in Chief, U.S. Pacific Fleet, and Commander in Chief, Pacific Ocean Areas, commanding Allied air, land, and sea forces during World War II described the battle like this:

In a later engagement more than seventy Japanese vessels, including warships and transports were encountered by the Allied fleet and were sunk. The devastating blow which has been dealt to the Japanese fleet has isolated the enemy armies in Korea and has cut them off from their home bases. The naval action, which stretched over a period of several days, was broken off in the mid-summer of the year 1592. The naval forces were under the command of the Korean Admiral Yi Sun-sin.

James B. Lewis who is the University Lecturer at the University of Oxford described the battle like this:

It is important in the history of Joseon's naval warfare, since it was the only sea battle, out of the ten fought during the year, in which Joseon attacked the Japanese naval base with relatively inferior fire power. In spite of the loss of Chong Woon, one of Yi's staff who was shot during the battle, Yi achieved an enormous victory in sinking over 100 ships in this one battle alone. As winter crept in, the two parties found naval operations impossible and rode at anchor for the duration of the season.

American historian Samuel Hawley described the battle as such:

The Korean navy's attack on Busan had been astonishingly successful. It had destroyed fully a quarter of the Japanese fleet at a cost of just five men killed, twenty-five wounded, and no ships lost.

Even the books which were published by the Japanese Governor-General of Korea and Japanese historian the during Empire of Japan era also summarized this battle as a Korean decisive victory. Furthermore, the modern Japanese historians also said the battle was a Korean victory.

== See also ==
- Siege of Busan
- List of naval battles
- Military history of Korea
- Military history of Japan
- Yi Sun Sin
- Imjin War

== Bibliography ==
- Alagappa, Muthiah (2003), Asian Security Order: Instrumental and Normative Features, Stanford University Press, ISBN 0-8047-4629-X
- Arano, Yasunori (2005), The Formation of a Japanocentric World Order, International Journal of Asian Studies
- Brown, Delmer M. (May 1948), "The Impact of Firearms on Japanese Warfare, 1543–1598", The Far Eastern Quarterly, 7 (3), Association for Asian Studies: 236–53, doi:10.2307/2048846, JSTOR 2048846, S2CID 162924328
- Eikenberry, Karl W. (1988), "The Imjin War", Military Review, 68 (2): 74–82
- Ha, Tae-hung; Sohn, Pow-key (1977), 'Nanjung ilgi: War Diary of Admiral Yi Sun-sin, Yonsei University Press, ISBN 89-7141-018-3
- Haboush, JaHyun Kim (2016), The Great East Asian War and the Birth of the Korean Nation
- Hawley, Samuel (2005), The Imjin War, The Royal Asiatic Society, Korea Branch/UC Berkeley Press, ISBN 89-954424-2-5
- Jang, Pyun-soon (1998), Noon-eu-ro Bo-nen Han-gook-yauk-sa 5: Gor-yeo Si-dae (눈으로 보는 한국역사 5: 고려시대), Park Doo-ui, Bae Keum-ram, Yi Sang-mi, Kim Ho-hyun, Kim Pyung-sook, et al., Joog-ang Gyo-yook-yaun-goo-won. 1998-10-30. Seoul, Korea.
- Kim, Ki-chung (Fall 1999), "Resistance, Abduction, and Survival: The Documentary Literature of the Imjin War (1592–8)", Korean Culture, 20 (3): 20–29
- Kim, Yung-sik (1998), "Problems and Possibilities in the Study of the History of Korean Science", Osiris, 2nd Series, 13: 48–79, doi:10.1086/649280, JSTOR 301878, S2CID 143724260
- 桑田忠親 [Kuwata, Tadachika], ed., 舊參謀本部編纂, [Kyu Sanbo Honbu], 朝鮮の役 [Chousen no Eki] (日本の戰史 [Nihon no Senshi] Vol. 5), 1965.
- Neves, Jaime Ramalhete (1994), "The Portuguese in the Im-Jim War?", Review of Culture, 18: 20–24
- Niderost, Eric (June 2001), "Turtleboat Destiny: The Imjin War and Yi Sun Shin", Military Heritage, 2 (6): 50–59, 89
- Niderost, Eric (January 2002), "The Miracle at Myongnyang, 1597", Osprey Military Journal, 4 (1): 44–50
- Park, Yune-hee (1973), Admiral Yi Sun-shin and His Turtleboat Armada: A Comprehensive Account of the Resistance of Korea to the 16th Century Japanese Invasion, Shinsaeng Press
- Rockstein, Edward D. (1993), Strategic And Operational Aspects of Japan's Invasions of Korea 1592–1598 1993-6-18, Naval War College
- Sadler, A. L. (June 1937), "The Naval Campaign in the Korean War of Hideyoshi (1592–1598)", Transactions of the Asiatic Society of Japan, Second Series, 14: 179–208
- Sansom, George (1961), A History of Japan 1334–1615, Stanford University Press, ISBN 0-8047-0525-9
- Sohn, Pow-key (April–June 1959), "Early Korean Painting", Journal of the American Oriental Society, 79 (2): 96–103, doi:10.2307/595851, JSTOR 595851
- Stramigioli, Giuliana (December 1954), "Hideyoshi's Expansionist Policy on the Asiatic Mainland", Transactions of the Asiatic Society of Japan, Third Series, 3: 74–116
- Strauss, Barry (Summer 2005), "Korea's Legendary Admiral", MHQ: The Quarterly Journal of Military History, 17 (4): 52–61
- Swope, Kenneth M. (2006), "Beyond Turtleboats: Siege Accounts from Hideyoshi's Second Invasion of Korea, 1597–1598", Sungkyun Journal of East Asian Studies, 6 (2), Academy of East Asian Studies: 177–206
- Swope, Kenneth M. (2005), "Crouching Tigers, Secret Weapons: Military Technology Employed During the Sino-Japanese-Korean War, 1592–1598", The Journal of Military History, 69, Society for Military History: 11–42, doi:10.1353/jmh.2005.0059, S2CID 159829515
- Swope, Kenneth M. (December 2002), "Deceit, Disguise, and Dependence: China, Japan, and the Future of the Tributary System, 1592–1596", The International History Review, 24 (4): 757–1008, doi:10.1080/07075332.2002.9640980, S2CID 154827808
- Swope, Kenneth M. (2009), A Dragon's Head and a Serpent's Tail: Ming China and the First Great East Asian War, 1592–1598, University of Oklahoma Press
- Turnbull, Stephen (2002), Samurai Invasion: Japan's Korean War 1592–98, Cassell & Co, ISBN 0-304-35948-3
- Turnbull, Stephen (2008), The Samurai Invasion of Korea 1592-98, Osprey Publishing Ltd
- Turnbull, Stephen (1998), The Samurai Sourcebook, Cassell & Co, ISBN 1-85409-523-4
- Villiers, John (1980), SILK and Silver: Macau, Manila and Trade in the China Seas in the Sixteenth Century (A lecture delivered to the Hong Kong Branch of the Royal Asiatic Society at the Hong Kong Club. 10 June 1980). The HKUL Digital Initiatives
- Yi, Min-woong (2004), Imjin Wae-ran Haejeonsa: The Naval Battles of the Imjin War [임진왜란 해전사], Chongoram Media [청어람미디어], ISBN 89-89722-49-7
