= Battle of Dangpo (1592) =

1592 Japan–Korea naval battle

- Part of Imjin War
Date	July 10, 1592 (Gregorian Calendar); June 2, 1592 (Lunar calendar)
Location	Tongyeong, Korea 34°50′45″N 128°25′25″E
Result	Korean victory

Belligerents
Japanese Fleet	Joseon

Commanders and leaders
Kurushima Michiyuki †; Kamei Korenori	Yi Sun-sin; Wŏn Kyun

Strength
21 warships	26 ships: Yi Sun-sin; 22 panokseon; 1 geobukseon; Wŏn Kyun; 4 panokseon

Casualties and losses
21 ships sunk	None
- Location within South Korea Battle of Dangpo (1592) (Korea)

The Battle of Dangpo (Korean: 당포 해전; Hanja: 唐浦海戰) was a naval engagement during the Japanese invasions of Korea (1592–1598) on 10 July that resulted in Yi Sun-sin's victory.

== Prelude ==
The day after the Battle of Sacheon, Admiral Yi Sun-shin had his fleet rest in the open sea off Saryang where they would have the tactical advantage were the Japanese to execute a counterattack. Admiral Yi once again summoned his resting fleet to arms the morning of July 10 (lunar June 2) when he received a report that 21 Japanese ships were docked at the harbor of Dangpo.

At Dangpo, the subordinate of Kurushima Michifusa, Kurushima Michiyuki, was commanding his troops to loot and burn a coastal town.

== The attack ==
As the Korean fleet approached the Dangpo harbor, Yi Sun-shin noticed that the flagship of this Japanese fleet was anchored among the other vessels. Realizing the golden opportunity, Admiral Yi led the assault with his own flagship (a turtleship) targeting the Japanese flagship. The sturdy construction of his turtleship allowed Yi Sun-shin to easily ram through the line of Japanese ships and position his ship right alongside the anchored Japanese flagship. The light construction of the Japanese ship was no match for a full broadside assault and was left sinking in minutes. From the turtle ship, a hail of cannonballs rained down on the other ships, destroying more vessels. The Koreans circled the other ships anchored and began to sink them. Then, Korean general Kwŏn Chun shot an arrow into Michiyuki. The Japanese commander fell dead and a Korean captain jumped onboard and cut off his head. A Korean girl who had been taken prisoner and forced to become Kurushima's mistress, in an interview after the battle, said:

On the day of the battle, arrows and bullets rained on the pavilion vessel where he [Kurushima] sat. First he was hit on the brow but was unshaken, but when an arrow pierced his chest, he fell down with a loud cry", while the turtle ship "dashed close to this pavilion vessel and broke it by shooting cannonballs from the dragon's mouth and by pouring down arrows and cannonballs from other cannon".

The Japanese soldiers panicked upon seeing the beheading of their admiral and were slaughtered by the Koreans in their confusion. The remaining Japanese abandoned the fight and fled into the hills. Admiral Yi ordered a landing party to destroy the enemy base on the beach, but once again was forced to recall his order when he heard reports that at least 20 ships were bearing down on them from Koje-do. Wishing to give his fleet the greatest tactical advantage possible, he ordered his ships to sail out of the bay and into the open sea. The battle would not continue on this day, however, as the Japanese ships made a hasty retreat into the descending darkness upon seeing the intimidating Korean fleet.

== Aftermath ==
After the battle, the Koreans searched Kurushima's flagship and captured a beautiful golden fan that belonged to Kamei Korenori.

Yi Sun-sin and Wŏn Kyun spent the next two days searching for more enemy ships. On 11 July Yi Ŏkki joined them with 25 more warships, bringing their fleet strength to 51 ships in total. Admiral Yi then set out and searched the surrounding islands until he received a report from fishermen that another small fleet of Japanese ships lay anchored at Danghangpo, which was to be the site of another battle.

== Bibliography ==
- Alagappa, Muthiah (2003), Asian Security Order: Instrumental and Normative Features, Stanford University Press, ISBN 0-8047-4629-X
- Arano, Yasunori (2005), The Formation of a Japanocentric World Order, International Journal of Asian Studies
- Brown, Delmer M. (May 1948), "The Impact of Firearms on Japanese Warfare, 1543–1598", The Far Eastern Quarterly, 7 (3), Association for Asian Studies: 236–53, doi:10.2307/2048846, JSTOR 2048846, S2CID 162924328
- Eikenberry, Karl W. (1988), "The Imjin War", Military Review, 68 (2): 74–82
- Ha, Tae-hung; Sohn, Pow-key (1977), 'Nanjung Ilgi: War Diary of Admiral Yi Sun-sin, Yonsei University Press, ISBN 89-7141-018-3
- Haboush, JaHyun Kim (2016), The Great East Asian War and the Birth of the Korean Nation
- Hawley, Samuel (2005), The Imjin War, The Royal Asiatic Society, Korea Branch/UC Berkeley Press, ISBN 89-954424-2-5
- Hawley, Samuel (2014), The Imjin War: Japan's Sixteenth-Century Invasion of Korea and Attempt to Conquer China, Conquistador Press, ISBN 978-0-9920786-2-1
- Jang, Pyun-soon (1998), Noon-eu-ro Bo-nen Han-gook-yauk-sa 5: Gor-yeo Si-dae (눈으로 보는 한국역사 5: 고려시대), Park Doo-ui, Bae Keum-ram, Yi Sang-mi, Kim Ho-hyun, Kim Pyung-sook, et al., Joog-ang Gyo-yook-yaun-goo-won. 1998-10-30. Seoul, Korea.
- Kim, Ki-chung (Fall 1999), "Resistance, Abduction, and Survival: The Documentary Literature of the Imjin War (1592–8)", Korean Culture, 20 (3): 20–29
- Kim, Yung-sik (1998), "Problems and Possibilities in the Study of the History of Korean Science", Osiris, 2nd Series, 13: 48–79, doi:10.1086/649280, JSTOR 301878, S2CID 143724260
- 桑田忠親 [Kuwata, Tadachika], ed., 舊參謀本部編纂, [Kyu Sanbo Honbu], 朝鮮の役 [Chousen no Eki] (日本の戰史 [Nihon no Senshi] Vol. 5), 1965.
- Neves, Jaime Ramalhete (1994), "The Portuguese in the Im-Jim War?", Review of Culture, 18: 20–24
- Niderost, Eric (June 2001), "Turtleboat Destiny: The Imjin War and Yi Sun Shin", Military Heritage, 2 (6): 50–59, 89
- Niderost, Eric (January 2002), "The Miracle at Myongnyang, 1597", Osprey Military Journal, 4 (1): 44–50
- Park, Yune-hee (1973), Admiral Yi Sun-shin and His Turtleboat Armada: A Comprehensive Account of the Resistance of Korea to the 16th Century Japanese Invasion, Shinsaeng Press
- Rockstein, Edward D. (1993), Strategic And Operational Aspects of Japan's Invasions of Korea 1592–1598 1993-6-18, Naval War College
- Sadler, A. L. (June 1937), "The Naval Campaign in the Korean War of Hideyoshi (1592–1598)", Transactions of the Asiatic Society of Japan, Second Series, 14: 179–208
- Sansom, George (1961), A History of Japan 1334–1615, Stanford University Press, ISBN 0-8047-0525-9
- Sohn, Pow-key (April–June 1959), "Early Korean Painting", Journal of the American Oriental Society, 79 (2): 96–103, doi:10.2307/595851, JSTOR 595851
- Stramigioli, Giuliana (December 1954), "Hideyoshi's Expansionist Policy on the Asiatic Mainland", Transactions of the Asiatic Society of Japan, Third Series, 3: 74–116
- Strauss, Barry (Summer 2005), "Korea's Legendary Admiral", MHQ: The Quarterly Journal of Military History, 17 (4): 52–61
- Swope, Kenneth M. (2006), "Beyond Turtleboats: Siege Accounts from Hideyoshi's Second Invasion of Korea, 1597–1598", Sungkyun Journal of East Asian Studies, 6 (2), Academy of East Asian Studies: 177–206
- Swope, Kenneth M. (2005), "Crouching Tigers, Secret Weapons: Military Technology Employed During the Sino-Japanese-Korean War, 1592–1598", The Journal of Military History, 69, Society for Military History: 11–42, doi:10.1353/jmh.2005.0059, S2CID 159829515
- Swope, Kenneth M. (December 2002), "Deceit, Disguise, and Dependence: China, Japan, and the Future of the Tributary System, 1592–1596", The International History Review, 24 (4): 757–1008, doi:10.1080/07075332.2002.9640980, S2CID 154827808
- Swope, Kenneth M. (2009), A Dragon's Head and a Serpent's Tail: Ming China and the First Great East Asian War, 1592–1598, University of Oklahoma Press
- Turnbull, Stephen (2002), Samurai Invasion: Japan's Korean War 1592–98, Cassell & Co, ISBN 0-304-35948-3
- Turnbull, Stephen (2008), The Samurai Invasion of Korea 1592-98, Osprey Publishing Ltd
- Turnbull, Stephen (1998), The Samurai Sourcebook, Cassell & Co, ISBN 1-85409-523-4
- Villiers, John (1980), SILK and Silver: Macau, Manila and Trade in the China Seas in the Sixteenth Century (A lecture delivered to the Hong Kong Branch of the Royal Asiatic Society at the Hong Kong Club. 10 June 1980) (PDF), The HKUL Digital Initiatives
- Yi, Min-woong (2004), Imjin Wae-ran Haejeonsa: The Naval Battles of the Imjin War [임진왜란 해전사], Chongoram Media [청어람미디어], ISBN 89-89722-49-7
