= Yi Sun-sin =

16th-century Korean naval commander

Duke Ch'ungmu Yi Sun-sin
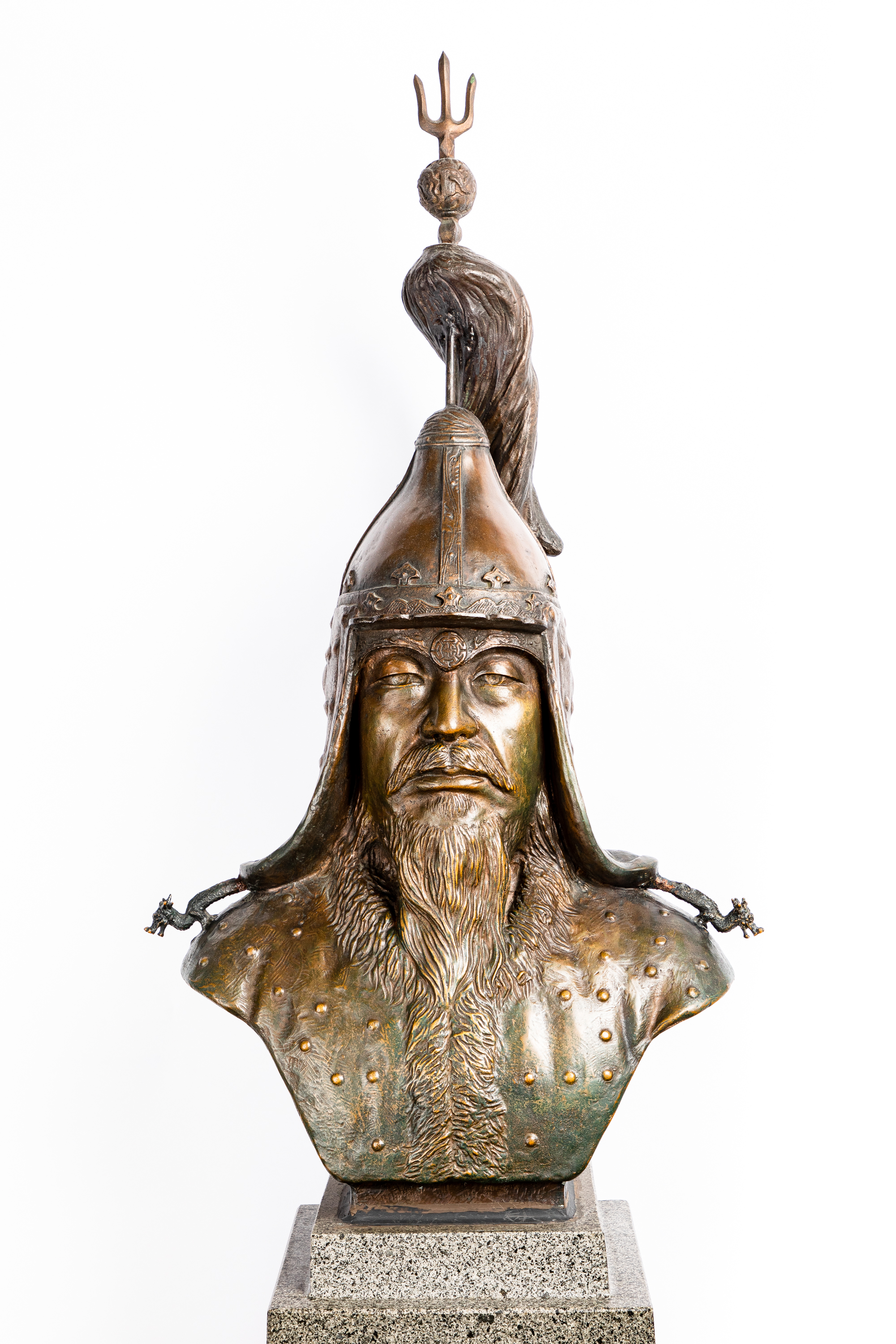
- Modern bust depicting Yi
- Born: April 28, 1545; Euljiro-dong, Hanseong, Joseon
- Died: December 16, 1598 (aged 53); Namhae Island, Gyeongsang Province, Joseon
- Burial place: Tomb of Yi Sun-sin
- Spouse(s): Lady Bang; Lady Oh; Lady Buandaek
- Children: legitimate: 3 sons, 1 daughter; illegitimate: 2 sons, 2 daughters
- Military career
- Allegiance: Joseon
- Branch: Joseon Navy
- Rank: Commander of the Three Provinces
- Conflicts: Imjin War; Battle of Okpo; Battle of Happo; Battle of Jeokjinpo; Battle of Sacheon (1592); Battle of Dangpo (1592); Battle of Danghangpo; Battle of Hansan Island; Battle of Angolpo; Battle of Busan (1592); Battle of Myeongnyang; Siege of Suncheon; Battle of Noryang †

Korean name
- Hangul: 이순신
- Hanja: 李舜臣
- RR: I Sunsin
- MR: I Sunsin

Art name
- Hangul: 기계, 덕암
- Hanja: 器溪, 德巖
- RR: Gigye, Deokam
- MR: Kigye, Tŏgam

Courtesy name
- Hangul: 여해
- Hanja: 汝諧
- RR: Yeohae
- MR: Yŏhae

Posthumous name
- Hangul: 충무
- Hanja: 忠武
- RR: Chungmu
- MR: Ch'ungmu

Internal Prince Tŏkp'ung
- Hangul: 덕풍부원군
- Hanja: 德豐府院君
- RR: Deokpung buwongun
- MR: Tŏkp'ung puwŏn'gun

Signature
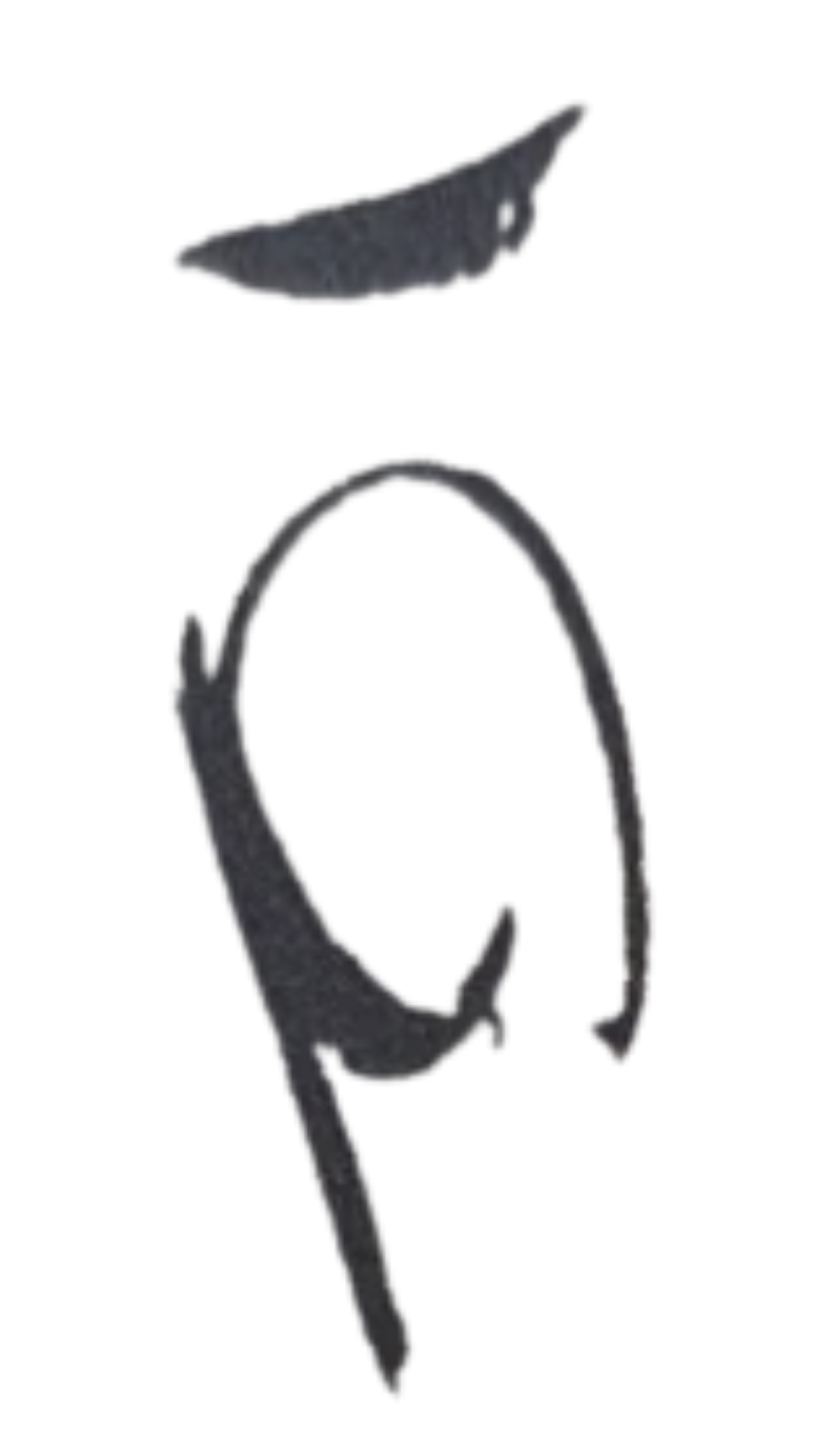

Yi Sun-sin (Korean: 이순신; Hanja: 李舜臣; Korean pronunciation: [i.sʰun.ɕin]; April 28, 1545 – December 16, 1598) was a Korean admiral and military general known for his victories against the Japanese navy during the Imjin War in the Joseon period. Yi's courtesy name was Yŏhae (여해), and he was posthumously honored with the title Lord of Loyal Valor (충무공; 忠武公).

The exact number of naval engagements conducted by Admiral Yi against the Japanese is a subject of historical debate. However, it is generally accepted that he fought in at least 23 naval battles, achieving victory in all. In many of these engagements, he commanded forces that were outnumbered and poorly supplied. His most dramatic success occurred in the Battle of Myeongnyang, where he led a Korean fleet of 13 ships to victory against a Japanese fleet of at least 133. Yi died from a gunshot wound in the Battle of Noryang, the last major battle of the Imjin War, on December 16, 1598.

Yi is considered one of history's greatest naval commanders, known for his strategic vision, intelligence, innovations, and personality (see military evaluation). He is a prominent figure in Korean history, with landmarks, awards, and towns named after him, as well as numerous films and documentaries about his achievements. His wartime journals, known as the Nanjung Ilgi, are part of UNESCO's Memory of the World initiative.

== Early life ==
Yi Sun-sin was born in Geoncheon-dong (건천동; 乾川洞), Hanseong (present-day Inhyeon-dong, Jung District, Seoul) to Yi Chŏng (이정; 李貞) and a lady of the Ch'ogye Pyŏn clan. His family belonged to the Deoksu Yi clan. His grandfather, Yi Paengnok (이백록; 李百祿), had entered government service but was later impeached during the Gimyo literati purge. Yi's father, Yi Chŏng, did not pursue a government career, despite the expectations placed on a yangban family.

As a child, Yi enjoyed playing war games and was always chosen as the leader. He carried a bow and arrows and would pretend to shoot at anyone, even adults, if he thought they acted unfairly. This made the villagers fear him, and they avoided passing by his house. According to Chungmugonghaengjang (충무공행장; 忠武公行狀), a biography believed to have been published during King Sunjo's reign, Yi moved to Asan before the age of eight, where his future wife's family resided.

Despite Yi's prominent family background, Yi was largely left to navigate his own career path, because both his grandfather and father had failed to establish themselves in government. Instead of familial support, Yi relied on Yu Sŏngnyong – a prominent scholar-official who later served as Chief State Councilor and oversaw military affairs during the Japanese invasions of Korea (1592–1598) – to endorse and propel him to high military posts within the royal court. Yi and Yu were neighbors in Geoncheon-dong and acquainted with one another. One record suggests that Yi and Yu met for the first time when Yi was 22 and Yu was 25, indicating Yi had returned from Asan to Seoul by then.

== Military career ==
In 1576, Yi passed the military examination (무과; 武科). He is said to have impressed the judges with his archery, but failed to pass the test when he broke a leg during the cavalry section. After he re-entered and passed the examination, he was posted to the Bukbyeong (Northern Frontier Army) military district in Hamgyeong province. However, he was the oldest junior officer at the age of thirty-two. There, Yi experienced battles defending the border settlements against the Jurchen marauders and quickly became known for his strategic skills and leadership.

In 1583, he lured the Jurchen into battle, defeated the marauders, and captured their chief, Mu Pai Nai. According to a contemporary tradition, Yi then spent three years out of the army upon hearing of his father's death. After his return to the front line, Yi led a string of successful campaigns against the Jurchen.

However, his brilliance and accomplishments so soon in his career made his superiors jealous, and they falsely accused him of desertion during battle. The conspiracy was led by General Yi Il, who would later fail to repel the Japanese invasion at the Battle of Sangju. This tendency to sabotage and frame professional adversaries was very common in the later years of the Joseon military and government. Yi was stripped of his rank, imprisoned, and tortured. After his release, Yi was allowed to fight as an enlisted soldier. After a short period of time, however, he was appointed as the commander of the Seoul Hunryeonwon (a military training center) and was later transferred to a small county, to be its military magistrate.

Yi's efforts in northern Korea were rewarded when he was assigned as Commander of the Jeolla Province (전라 좌도; 全羅左道) Left Naval District. (Note: "The Jeolla Navy camp had two headquarters: Jeolla Left Navy and Jeolla Right Navy.") Within the span of a few months in late 1590, he received four military appointments, in rapid succession, with each subsequent post carrying greater responsibility than the last: Commander of the Kosarijin Garrison in Pyongan Province, Commander of the Manpo Garrison, also in Pyongan Province, and the Commander of the Wando Garrison, in Jeolla province, before finally receiving the appointment as Commander of the Left Jeolla Naval District.

The royal court was in a state of confusion over the possibility of a war with Japan, now unified under the rule of Toyotomi Hideyoshi, and the unstable situation in Manchuria where a young Jurchen chieftain named Nurhaci was gathering strength. Nurhaci's descendants would become masters of China as founders of the Qing dynasty in a few decades, after invading Korea in 1627 and 1637.

Yi assumed his new post at Yeosu on the 13th day of the 2nd lunar month of 1591 (March 13, 1591). From there, he was able to undertake a buildup of the regional navy, which was later used to confront the Japanese invasion force. He subsequently began to strengthen the province's navy with a series of reforms, including the construction of the turtle ship.

=== Japanese invasions of Korea (1592–1598) ===
Map of Yi Sun-sin's naval campaigns – 1592

Yi is remembered for his numerous victories fighting the Japanese during the Japanese invasions of Korea (1592–1598), also referred to as the Imjin War. Among his twenty-three victories, the Battle of Myeongnyang and the Battle of Hansan Island are the most famous battles.

In 1592, Toyotomi Hideyoshi gave the order to invade Korea and use it as a forward base to conquer Ming China. After the Japanese attacked Busan, Yi began his naval operations from his headquarters at Yeosu. Despite never having commanded a naval battle in his life, he won the Battle of Okpo, Battle of Sacheon, and several others in quick succession. His string of victories made the Japanese generals suddenly wary of the threat at sea. Yi never lost a battle during the Imjin War.

==== Four campaigns of 1592 ====
A Japanese invasion force landed at Busan and Dadaejin, port cities on the southern tip of Joseon. The Japanese, without meeting any naval resistance, quickly captured these ports and began a lightning march north. They reached Seoul in just nineteen days, on May 2, 1592, due to the military inefficiency of the Joseon army, especially at the Battle of Sangju and the failure to defend Joryeong Pass.

After capturing Hanseong and Pyongyang, the Japanese planned to cross the Yalu River into Chinese territory, and use the waters west of the Korean peninsula to supply the invasion. However, Yi Sun-sin was able to stay informed on all his enemy's activities.

===== First campaign =====
On the June 13, 1592, Admiral Yi and Admiral Yi Eok-gi (이억기; 李億祺; 1561–1597), the commander of the Right Jeolla navy, set sail with 24 panokseons, 15 small warships, and 46 boats (i.e. fishing boats), and arrived at the waters of Gyeongsang Province by sunset. The next day, the Jeolla fleet sailed to an arranged location where Admiral Wŏn Kyun (원균; 元均; 1540–1597) was supposed to meet them, and met the admiral on June 15. The augmented flotilla of 91 ships then began circumnavigating the Geoje Island, bound for the Gadeok Island, but scouting vessels detected 50 Japanese vessels at the harbor of Okpo. Upon sighting the approaching Korean fleet, some of the Japanese who had been busying themselves with plundering returned to their ships and began to flee. The Korean fleet encircled the Japanese ships and finished them off with artillery bombardments. The Koreans spotted five more Japanese vessels that night, and managed to destroy four of them. The next day, the Koreans approached 13 Japanese ships at Jeokjinpo, as reported by their intelligence. In the same manner as the previous success at Okpo, the Korean fleet destroyed 11 Japanese ships – completing the Battle of Okpo without the loss of a single ship.

===== Second campaign =====
About three weeks after the Battle of Okpo, Admirals Yi and Won sailed with a total of 26 ships (23 under Admiral Yi) toward the Bay of Sacheon upon receiving an intelligence report of a Japanese presence. Admiral Yi had left behind his fishing vessels that used to make up most of his fleet in favor of his newly completed turtle ship. Admiral Yi ordered the fleet to feign withdrawal, which caused the Japanese to eagerly pursue the Korean fleet with their 12 vessels. With the Japanese ships drawn out of the safety of the harbor, the Korean navy countered, and with the turtle ship leading the charge, they successfully destroyed all 12 ships. Admiral Yi was shot by a bullet in his left shoulder, but survived.

On July 10, 1592, the Korean fleet destroyed 21 Japanese ships at the Battle of Dangpo. On July 13, they destroyed 26 Japanese warship at the Battle of Danghangpo.

===== Third campaign =====
In response to the Korean navy's success, Toyotomi Hideyoshi recalled three admirals from land-based activities: Wakizaka Yasuharu, Kato Yoshiaki, and Kuki Yoshitaka. They were the only ones with naval responsibilities in the entire Japanese invasion force. However, the admirals arrived in Busan nine days before Hideyoshi's order was actually issued, and assembled a squadron to counter the Korean navy. Eventually Admiral Wakizaka completed his preparations, and his eagerness to win military honor pushed him to launch an attack against the Koreans without waiting for the other admirals to finish.

The combined Korean navy of 70 ships under the commands of Admirals Yi Sun-sin and Yi Eok-gi was carrying out a search-and-destroy operation because the Japanese troops on land were advancing into Jeolla Province. Jeolla Province was the only Korean territory to be untouched by a major military action, and served as home for the three admirals and the only active Korean naval force. The admirals considered it best to destroy naval support for the Japanese to reduce the effectiveness of the enemy ground troops.

On August 13, 1592, the Korean fleet sailing from Miruk Island at Dangpo received local intelligence that a large Japanese fleet was nearby. The following morning, the Korean fleet spotted the Japanese fleet of 82 vessels anchored in the strait of Gyeonnaeryang. Because of the narrowness of the strait and the hazard posed by the underwater rocks, Admiral Yi sent six ships to lure out 63 Japanese vessels into the wider sea, and the Japanese fleet followed. There the Japanese fleet was surrounded by the Korean fleet in a semicircular formation called the "crane wing" (학익진) by Admiral Yi. With at least three turtle ships (two of which were newly completed) spearheading the clash, the Korean vessels fired volleys of cannonballs into the Japanese formation. Then the Korean ships engaged in a free-for-all battle with the Japanese ships, maintaining enough distance to prevent the Japanese from boarding; Admiral Yi permitted melee combat only against severely damaged Japanese ships.

The Battle of Hansan Island ended in a Korean victory, with Japanese losses of 59 ships – 47 destroyed and 12 captured. Several Korean prisoners of war were rescued during the fight. Admiral Wakisaka escaped due to the speed of his flagship. When the news of the defeat reached Toyotomi Hideyoshi, he ordered that the Japanese invasion forces cease all naval operations.

On August 16, 1592, Yi Sun-sin led the fleet to the harbor of Angolpo, where 42 Japanese vessels were docked.

===== Fourth campaign =====
In September 1592, Yi left his base at Hansan Island and attacked the Japanese in Busan harbor. Yi withdrew his forces from Busan harbor after the battle due to the absence of a landing force.

===== Aftermath of four campaigns of 1592 =====
In 1593, Admiral Yi was appointed to command the combined navies of the three southern provinces with the title Naval Commander of the Three Provinces (삼도수군통제사; 三道水軍統制使) which gave him command over the Right and Left Navies of Jeolla province, the Right and Left Navies of Gyeongsang province, and the Navy of Chungcheong province.

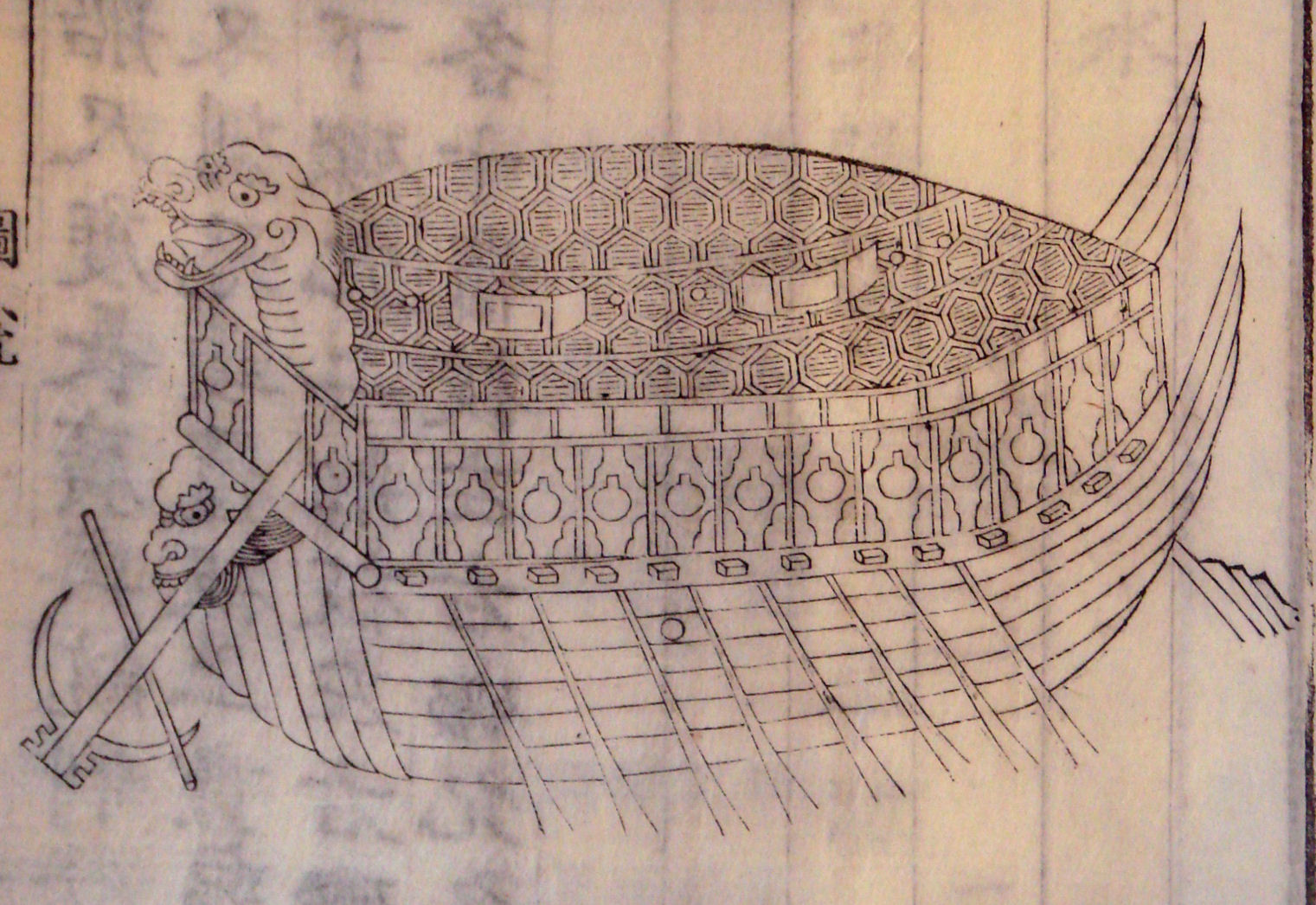
Drawing of a 16th-century turtle ship

Yi designed and built a number of warships known as geobukseon (거북선; lit. 'turtle ship'), characterized by their tortoise-like design, dragon-shaped figurehead, and iron-spiked deck. The turtle ship measured 65 feet in length, with a width of 12 feet at the bow, 10.5 feet at the stern, and 14.5 feet amidships. Each broadside featured six gun ports, each armed with a mortar, supplemented by additional mortars positioned ahead and astern. The dragon-like figurehead emitted sulfurous smoke and created a smokescreen to obscure the ship's movements. Narrow slits between the gun ports allowed for the discharge of fire-arrows and gunfire. The roof, covered with planks and spikes, thwarted Japanese boarding tactics.

==== Dismissal of Yi Sun-sin ====
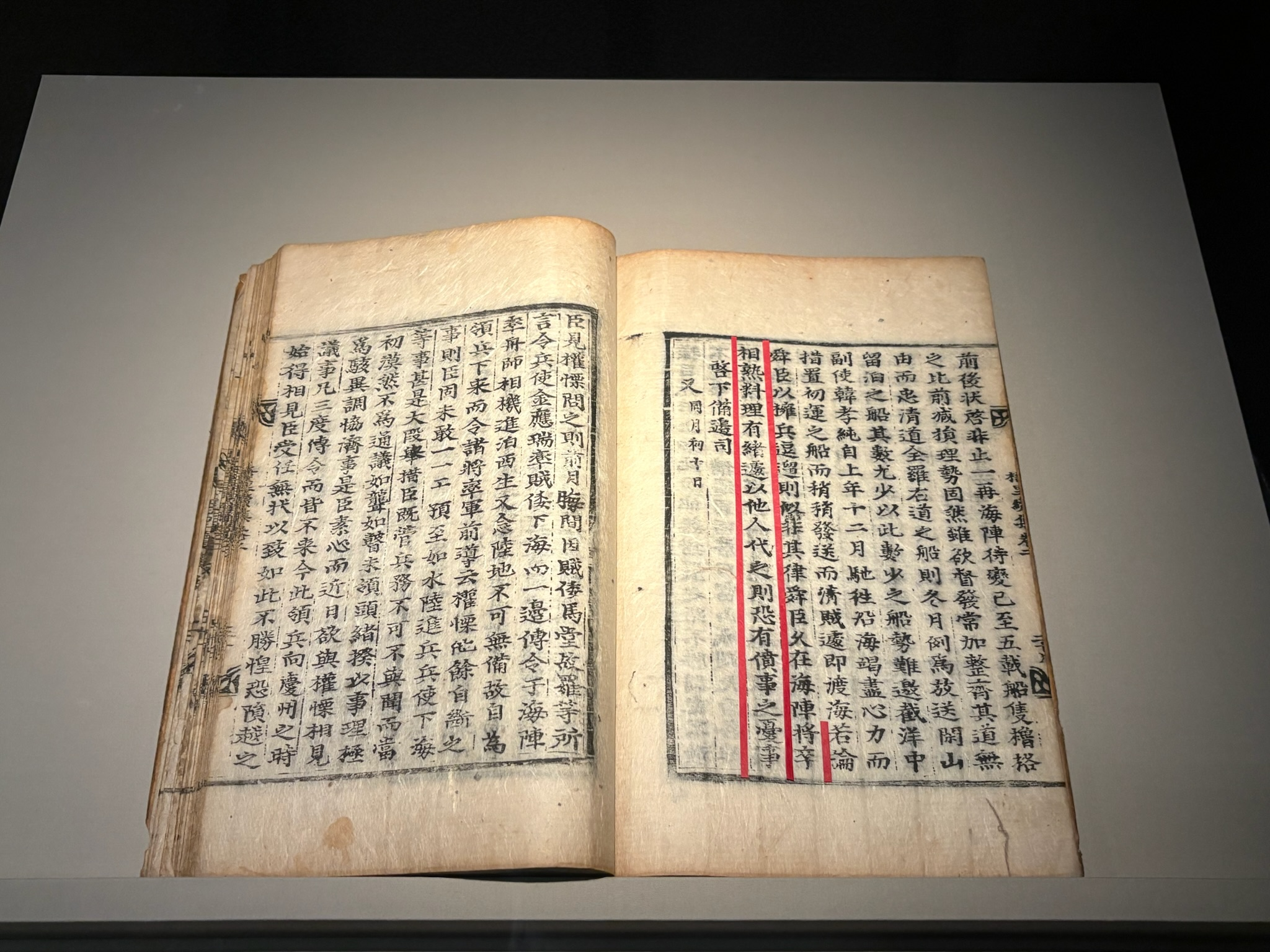
In early 1597, Yi Wŏnik, then a high-ranking government official, submitted a formal petition opposing the dismissal of Admiral Yi during the Imjin War. In the previous year, the royal court had repeatedly discussed removing Yi Sun-sin from command and replacing him with Wŏn Kyun. Yi Wŏnik argued that Yi Sun-sin was the most capable leader for the navy and that Wŏn Kyun was unsuitable to lead.

One day, he told General Kim Gyeong-seo that the Japanese general Katō Kiyomasa would be coming on a certain date with a great fleet for another attack on the south shores and insisted that Admiral Yi be sent to lay an ambush. General Kim agreed and sent the message to Field Marshal Gwon Yul (권율; 權慄; 1537–1599), Commander-in-Chief (도원수; 導元帥) of the Joseon military, who, in turn, sent the message to King Seonjo. King Seonjo, who was desperate for victories to loosen the Japanese grip on his kingdom, gave permission for the attack. When General Kim gave Admiral Yi his orders, the admiral refused to carry them out, for he knew that the location given was studded with sunken rocks and was thus extremely dangerous. Admiral Yi also refused because he did not trust the words.

When General Kim informed the king of Admiral Yi's refusal, the admiral's enemies at court quickly insisted on his replacement by General Wŏn Kyun, former commander of the Gyeongsang Province Western Fleet & Commander of the Jeolla Province Ground Forces. They advised that Admiral Yi be arrested.

As a result, in 1597, Yi was relieved of command, placed under arrest, and taken to Seoul in chains to be imprisoned and tortured. Yi was tortured almost to the point of death by using simple torture tactics such as whipping, flogging, burning, the cudgel, and torture by leg-breaking. King Seonjo wanted to have Yi killed, but the admiral's supporters at court, chiefly the minister Jeong Tak (정탁; 鄭琢; 1526–1605), convinced the king to spare him due to his past service record. The prime minister, Yu Sŏngnyong, who was Yi's childhood friend and his main supporter, remained silent during this deadly hour. Spared the death penalty, Admiral Yi was again demoted to the rank of a common infantry soldier under General Gwon Yul. This penalty was worse than death for Joseon generals at that time, since they lived by honor. However, Yi responded to this humiliation as a most obedient subject, quietly going about his work as if his rank and orders were appropriate. Despite his low rank, many officers treated him with respect, since they knew that the admiral did nothing wrong. Yi would stay under General Gwon Yul's command for a short while until Wŏn Kyun's death at the Battle of Chilchonryang, which would lead to his reinstatement.

==== Joseon defeat at Chilchonryang and reinstatement of Admiral Yi ====
With Yi stripped of influence and negotiations breaking down in 1596, Hideyoshi again ordered an attack on Joseon. The second Japanese invasion landed in the first month of 1597 with a force of 140,000 men transported on 1000 ships. In response, Ming China sent thousands of reinforcements to aid Joseon. With the help of the Ming, the Joseon army was able to halt the Japanese offensive and push it back during the winter of 1597, before the Japanese were able to reach the Joseon capitol of Hanseong.

On the high seas, Yi's successor Wŏn Kyun failed to respond to reports from his scouts and allowed the Japanese to land critical reinforcements at Sosang Harbor for their land offensive unopposed. Without adequate reconnaissance or planning, Wŏn Kyun decided to attack with the entire naval force of Joseon at his disposal – a fleet consisting of 150 warships operated by 30,000 men that had been carefully assembled and trained by Admiral Yi. Wŏn Kyun left anchor at Yeosu with the fleet and sailed into waters marked by treacherous rocks. The Japanese ambushed the Joseon fleet in the Battle of Chilchonryang on August 28, 1597. Ignorant of the strength and disposition of the enemy, Won was stunned to find a Japanese fleet of 500 to 1000 ships which immediately closed for melee combat, denying the Joseon ships the advantages of superior seamanship and cannon fire. The exhausted Joseon sailors were reduced to fighting boarding actions while heavily outnumbered and were slaughtered en masse.

The Joseon fleet was decimated with only 13 warships surviving under Admiral Bae Seol, who fled before battle was fully engaged to save the warships under his command. After the destruction of the Joseon fleet, Wŏn Kyun and Yi Eok-gi, another Joseon commander, fled to an island with a band of survivors but were killed by waiting Japanese soldiers from the nearby fort. When King Seonjo and the royal court learned of the catastrophic defeat, they hurriedly pardoned and reinstated Admiral Yi as commander of the greatly reduced Joseon fleet.

==== Battle of Myeongnyang ====
Admiral Yi located the 13 warships and rallied the 200 surviving sailors. Together with his flagship, Admiral Yi's entire fleet totaled 13 ships, none of which were turtle ships. In the belief that the Joseon fleet would never be restorable, King Seonjo, sent an edict to Admiral Yi to abandon the warships and take his men to join the ground forces under General Gwon Yul. Admiral Yi responded with a letter written "...your servant still doth have twelve warships under his command and he is still alive, that the enemy shall never be safe in the West Sea" (the Yellow Sea being the closest body of water to Hanseong).

Emboldened after their victory at Chilchonryang, Japanese admirals Kurushima Michifusa, Todo Takatora, Kato Yoshiaki, and Wakisaka Yasuharu sailed out of Busan Harbor with a fleet of over 300 ships, confident that they would defeat Admiral Yi. Elimination of the Joseon fleet would mean unrestricted movement of supplies and reinforcements from Japan for the land offensive towards Hanseong and beyond.

After careful study of potential battlefields, in October 1597 Admiral Yi lured the Japanese fleet into the Myeongnyang Strait, by sending a fast warship near the Japanese naval base and luring the Japanese fleet out of anchorage. The Japanese assumed that this was a Joseon scouting ship and that pursuing it would lead to the location of Admiral Yi, giving them an opportunity to destroy the remnants of the Joseon fleet. What they did not know was that they were being lured into a masterfully devised trap.

There were several reasons why Admiral Yi decided on this location for battle. Myeongnyang Strait had currents, eddies, and whirlpools so powerful that ships could only enter safely a few at a time. The north–south tidal flow reversed every three hours, limiting the time that the Japanese could mount an offensive. The strait was sufficiently narrow that it would prove impossible for the Japanese to flank or envelop the numerically inferior Joseon fleet. The deep shadows of the surrounding hillsides provided the Joseon ships with concealment. On that particular day there was also a heavy mist, dramatically reducing visibility in favor of the Joseon fleet. Therefore, despite being vastly outnumbered, Admiral Yi used the terrain restrictions to neutralize the Japanese navy's staggering numerical advantage.

The Japanese fleet of approximately 333 ships (133 warships, at least 200 logistical support ships) entered Myeongnyang Strait in groups. The Japanese ships that made it through were met by 13 Joseon warships obscured by the shadows of the surrounding hills, ready with archers and cannons, and the melee-based Japanese found themselves unable to fight effectively and break through the superior Joseon ranged fire. The unpredictable current eventually wreaked havoc on the Japanese; their ships found themselves unable to maneuver and collided with each other when the tide reversed, while also presenting a perfect target for the Joseon naval artillery. Admiral Yi was astonishingly able to rout a force that outnumbered him more than 25 to 1 in ships alone. About 31 of the 333 Japanese ships that entered the Myeongnyang Strait were destroyed or damaged. Joseon losses on the other hand were around ten casualties and no ships lost. Kurushima Michifusa was killed on his flagship by Joseon archers; his body in its ornate armor was fished out of the water and his severed head was put on display to further demoralize the Japanese fleet.

==== Final battle and Admiral Yi's death ====
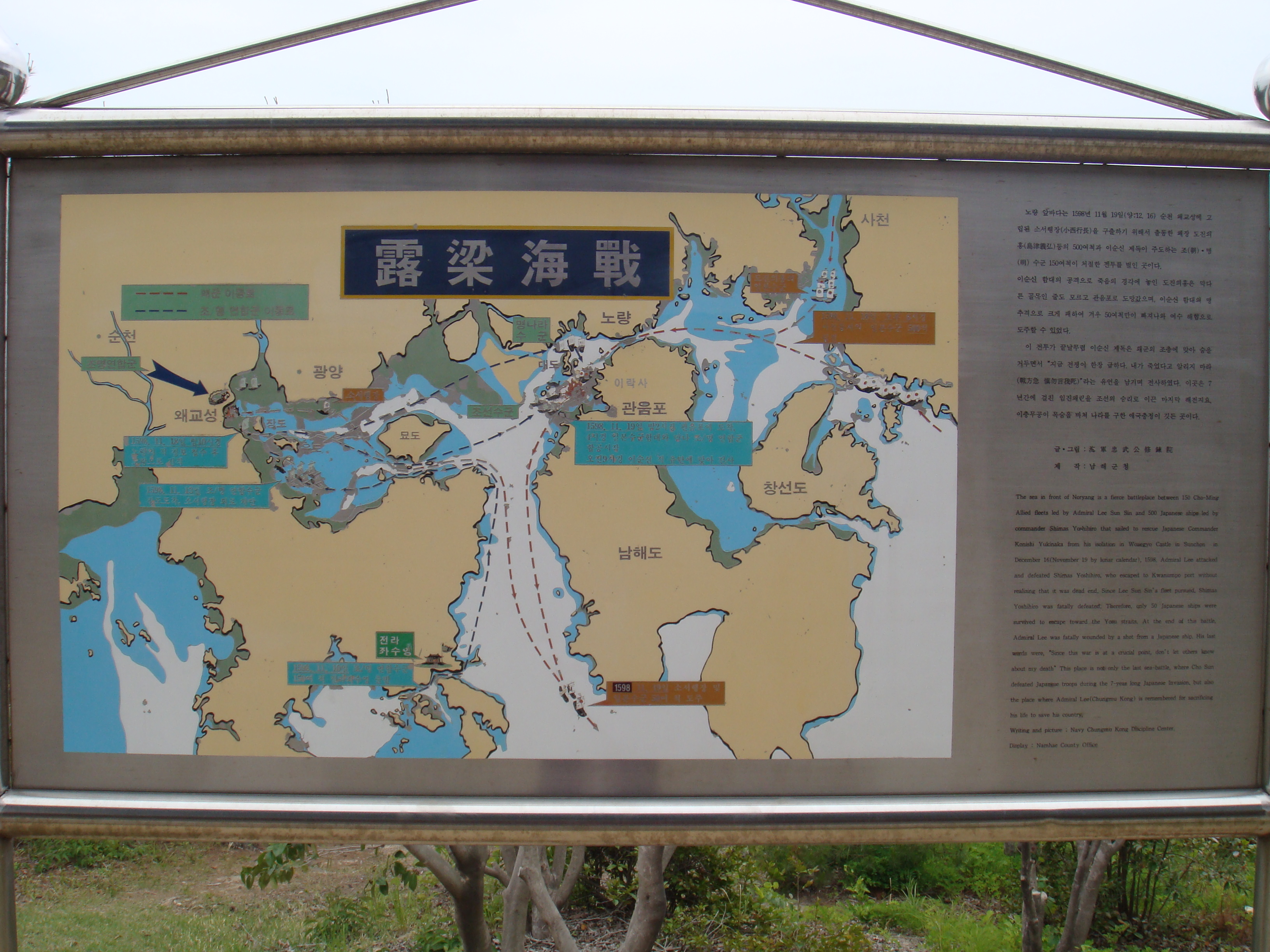
A map showing the movements of the navies in the battle.

On December 15, 1598, a huge Japanese fleet under the command of Shimazu Yoshihiro, was amassed in Sachon Bay, on the east end of Noryang Strait. Shimazu's goal was to break the allied forces' blockade on Konishi Yukinaga, join the two fleets, and sail home to Japan. Admiral Yi, meanwhile, knew exactly where Shimazu was, after receiving reports from scouts and local fishermen.

At this time, the Joseon fleet consisted of 82 panokseon, with 8,000 soldiers under Admiral Yi. The Ming fleet consisted of six large war junks, 57 lighter war galleys and two panokseon given to Chen Lin by Admiral Yi, with 5,000 Ming soldiers of the Guangdong squadron and 2,600 Ming marines who fought aboard Joseon ships.

The battle began at two o'clock in the early morning of December 16, 1598. Like Admiral Yi's previous battles, the Japanese were unable to respond effectively to the Korean's tactics. The tightness of Noryang Strait hindered lateral movement, and Yi's maneuvers prevented the Japanese fleet from boarding their enemies' vessels, their primary naval tactic.

As the Japanese retreated, Admiral Yi ordered a vigorous pursuit. During this time, a stray arquebus bullet from an enemy ship struck Admiral Yi, near his left armpit. Sensing that the wound was fatal, and fearing a repeat of the Battle of Chilchonryang, the admiral uttered, "The war is at its height – wear my armor and beat my war drums. Do not announce my death." He died moments later.

Only two people witnessed his death: Yi Hoe, Yi's eldest son, and Yi Wan, his nephew. Admiral Yi's son and nephew struggled to regain their composure and carried the admiral's body into his cabin before others could notice. For the remainder of the battle, Yi Wan wore his uncle's armor and continued to beat the war drum to encourage the pursuit.

Yi's tomb is located in Asan, South Korea.

==== Comrade Chen Lin ====
During the battle, Chen Lin and Yi were friends and allies who helped and rescued each other several times. When Chen Lin called for Admiral Yi to thank him for coming to his aid, he was met by Yi Wan, who announced that his uncle was dead. It is said that Chen himself was so shocked that he fell to the ground three times, beating his chest and crying. News of Admiral Yi's death spread quickly throughout the allied fleet and both Joseon and Ming sailors and fighting men wailed in grief. Chen Lin later reported the news of Yi's death to Wanli Emperor, where he bestowed gifts and eulogies on Chen and Yi. Since then, Yi and Chen were memorialized as national heroes in Korea. Chen's descendants were later welcomed back to Korea to start the Gwangdong Jin clan, because of Chen Lin's contributions in defeating the Japanese and his camaraderie with Yi Sunsin.

Admiral Yi's body was brought back to his hometown in Asan to be buried next to his father, Yi Jeong (in accordance to Korean tradition). Shrines, both official and unofficial, were constructed in his honor all throughout the land."

== Legacy ==
=== Military evaluation ===
Some say Yi is an exemplar of conduct for both Koreans and even Japanese.

Yi is often regarded as one of history's greatest admirals. Some military historians like Joseph Cummins and George Alexander Ballard place Yi on par with Horatio Nelson. According to Ballard:

It is always difficult for Englishmen to admit that Nelson ever had an equal in his profession, but if any man is entitled to be so regarded, it should be this great naval commander of Asiatic race who never knew defeat and died in the presence of the enemy; of whose movements a track-chart might be compiled from the wrecks of hundreds of Japanese ships lying with their valiant crews at the bottom of the sea, off the coasts of the Korean peninsula... and it seems, in truth, no exaggeration to assert that from first to last he never made a mistake, for his work was so complete under each variety of circumstances as to defy criticism... His whole career might be summarized by saying that, although he had no lessons from history to serve as a guide, he waged war on the sea as it should be waged if it is to produce definite results, and ended by making the supreme sacrifice of a defender of his country. (The Influence of the Sea on The Political History of Japan, pp. 66–67.)

Tōgō Heihachirō regarded Yi as his superior. At a party held in his honor, Tōgō took exception to a speech comparing him to Nelson and Yi:

It may be proper to compare me with Nelson, but not with Korea's Yi Sun-sin, for he has no equal. (The Imjin War, by Samuel Hawley, pg. 490)

Prior to the 1905 Battle of Tsushima, Kawada Isao recalled in his memoirs that:

...naturally we could not help but remind ourselves of Korea's Yi Sun-sin, the world's first sea commander, whose superlative personality, strategy, invention, commanding ability, intelligence, and courage were all worthy of our admiration. (The Imjin War, by Samuel Hawley, pg. 490)

Admiral Tetsutaro Sato of the Imperial Japanese Navy mentioned the Korean admiral in his book published in 1908:

Throughout history there have been few generals accomplished at the tactics of frontal attack, sudden attack, concentration and dilation. Napoleon, who mastered the art of conquering the part with the whole, can be held to have been such a general, and among admirals, two further tactical geniuses may be named: in the East, Yi Sun-sin of Korea, and in the West, Horatio Nelson of England. Undoubtedly, Yi is a supreme naval commander even on the basis of the limited literature of the Seven-Year War, and despite the fact that his bravery and brilliance are not known to the West, since he had the misfortune to be born in Joseon period. Anyone who can be compared to Yi should be better than Michiel de Ruyter from the Netherlands. Nelson is far behind Yi in terms of personal character and integrity. Yi was the inventor of the covered warship known as the turtle ship. He was a truly great commander and a master of the naval tactics of three hundred years ago. – A Military History of the Empire (Japanese: 帝國國防史論), p. 399

=== Titles and honors ===
Although the Korean royal court often ignored his successes during his life, after his death various honors were bestowed upon him, including the title of Chungmugong (충무공; 忠武公; Duke of Loyalty and Warfare), an enrollment as a Seonmu Ildeung Gongsin (선무일등공신; 宣武一等功臣; First-class military order of merit during the reign of Seonjo), and two posthumous offices, Yeonguijeong (영의정; 領議政; Prime Minister), and the Deokpung Buwongun (덕풍부원군; 德豊府院君; The Prince of the Court from Deokpung). His title of Samdo Sugun Tongjesa), lit. 'Naval Commander of the Three Provinces', was the title used for the commander of the Korean navy until 1896. Admiral Yi's posthumous title, Chungmugong, is used as South Korea's third highest military honor, known as The Cordon of Chungmu of the Order of Military Merit and Valor. He was posthumously granted the title of Prince of Deokpung (Chungmuro). In North Korea, the military awards the Order of Admiral Yi Sun-Sin (이순신장군훈장) to flag officers and naval commanders for outstanding leadership.

=== Relics ===
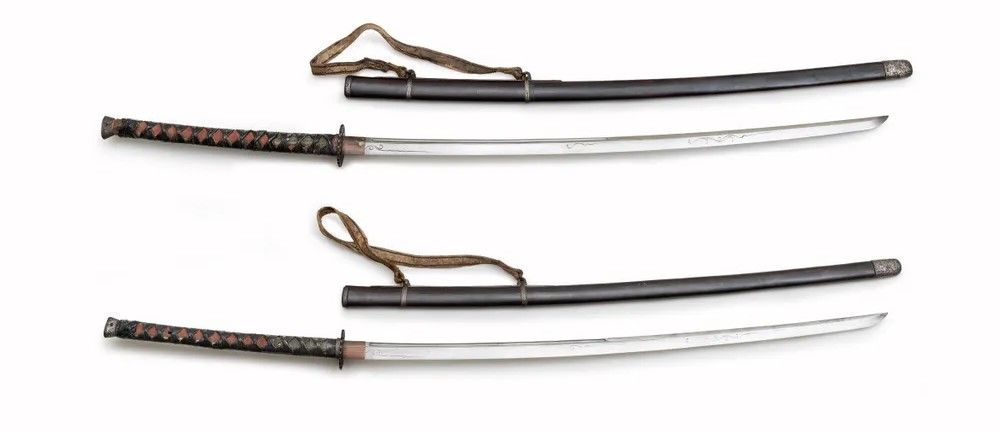
Yi Sun-sin Janggeom (이순신 장검; 李舜臣 長劍)

三尺誓天 山河動色
(I swear to heaven with the sword, the mountains and rivers tremble.)

一揮掃蕩血染山河
(With one swing, it sweeps away, the blood stains the mountains.)

- Inscribed poem of each sword

Janggeom (장검) are a pair of Korean swords made by Joseon swordsmiths commissioned by Yi Sun-sin. Those were designated as Treasure No. 326-1 in 1963 and promoted to a National Treasure of South Korea on August 24, 2023. Those are currently on display at Hyeonchungsa Shrine. Some elements of the Japanese sword manufacturing were used, including the mokjeong-hyeol (目釘穴) for aligning the holes.

Janggeom have additional historical value owing to their non-traditional design. The swords' materials are closer to that of Hwando than Katana, but since they are about 2 meters long, they resemble Odachi and are very different from Hwando, which rarely have a blade length greater than 1.5 meters. The guard and handle decoration are in the style of Katana, and the fishtail-shaped hilt is in the Ming dynasty style. After the sword was completed, Yi Sun-sin inscribed his own poem on each sword's blade.

== Public reception and fame ==
=== Joseon government ===
Admiral Yi repeatedly defeated the Japanese invasion force in battle, while preserving the lives of his soldiers and respecting their families. Yi was supported by the people of Joseon not only for his victories, but his kindness and gratitude towards those affected by the hardships of war. They had great faith in Admiral Yi and he was regarded as more than just an admiral.

By contrast, King Seonjo accomplished nothing. The Joseon period's king had failed to defend the kingdom and his cowardly flight to Uiju left his reputation in ruins. The Joseon government was plagued by factionalism driven by jealousy; the ministers despised the successful and virtuous admiral, and manipulated King Seonjo to view Admiral Yi as a potential traitor. It is plausible to believe that King Seonjo and his court truly feared Admiral Yi's victories and reputation amongst the people as the foundations for a revolt leading King Seonjo to have him arrested and tortured. Defended by his loyal friend, Prime Minister Yu Sŏngnyong, Admiral Yi was spared execution twice. The conspiracies worked against Admiral Yi from gaining the men, materiel, and operational freedom to decisively destroy the Japanese invasion force.

It should also be noted that according to a recent Choson Ilbo article, historians have discovered written government records of the Joseon government's reaction to Admiral Yi's death. The records show that King Seonjo expressed a "blank expression", offering no signs of sadness or shock. Nearly all awards to Admiral Yi and his deeds were awarded posthumously.

=== In South Korea ===
Yi is widely renowned in modern-day South Korea as the greatest general in Korean history. In a 2019 poll by Gallup Korea, Yi Sun-sin was chosen as the most respected person among South Koreans, winning 14% of the vote. Sejong the Great came in second with 11% of all votes. Prominent statues of Admiral Yi have been erected in the middle of Sejongno in central Seoul (the Statue of Admiral Yi Sun-sin) and at Busan Tower in Busan. The city of Chungmu on the southern coast of Korea, now renamed Tongyeong, is named in honor of his posthumous title and the site of his headquarters. Additionally, a street in downtown Seoul is named after him, and the Yi Sun-sin Bridge was built near Yeosu and opened to traffic on May 10, 2012, becoming the longest suspension bridge in Korea.

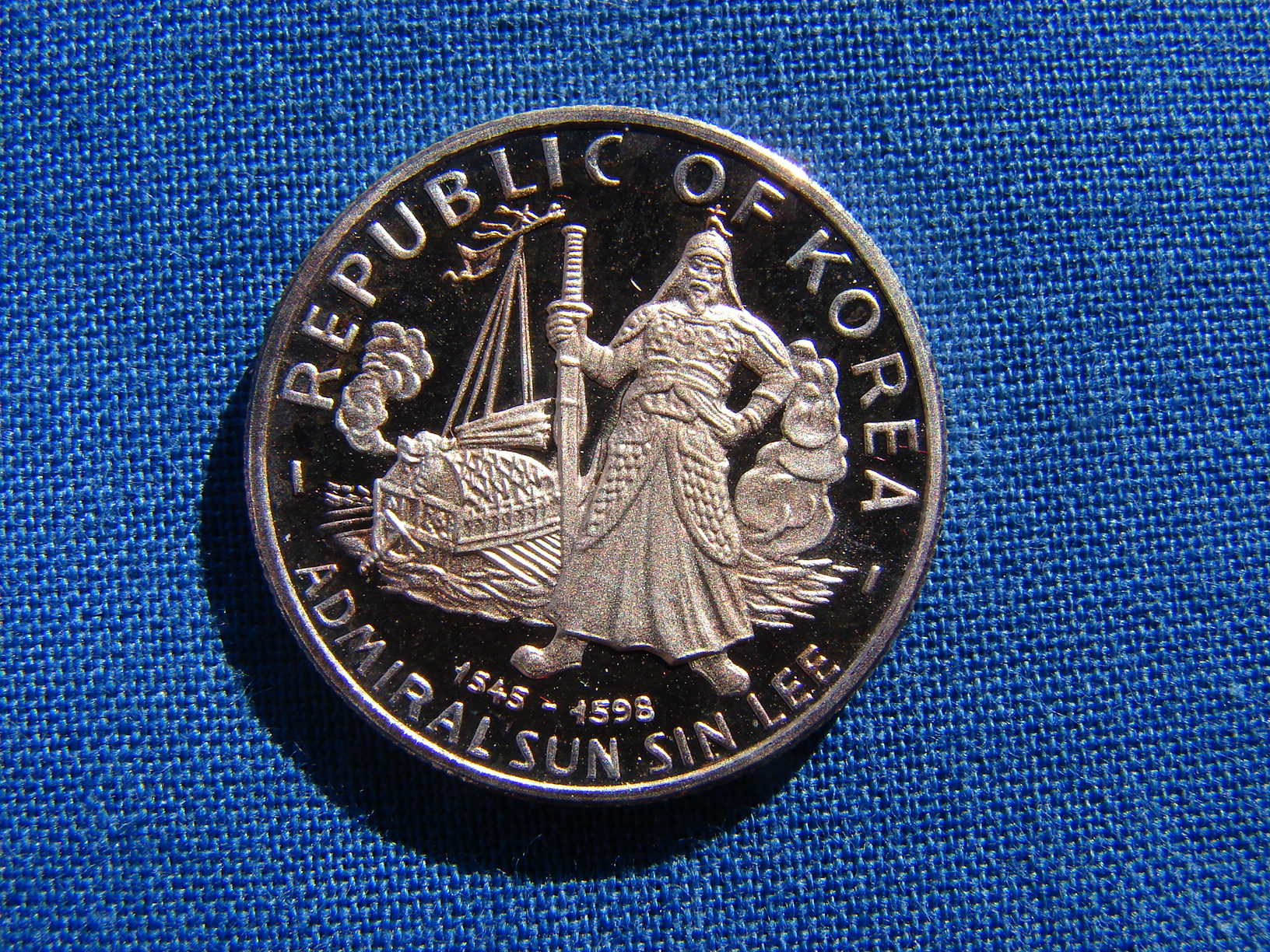
South Korean 100 Won 1970 Silver Coin in Commemoration of Admiral Sun-sin Yi

South Korea's KDX-II naval destroyer class, and the first commissioned ship of the class, are named Chungmugong Yi Sun-sin.

A shrine dedicated to Yi now stands in Asan, where he spent his adolescence years.

An ITF-style Taekwondo pattern is named after Yi's posthumous name of Chungmu.

A depiction of Admiral Yi is featured on the front of the 100 South Korean won coin.

=== In North Korea ===
In modern-day North Korea, Yi is honored as a patriot and a hero just like the South. However, as Yi was born into a yangban family, his actions are attributed to Joseon and its class systems. Thus, compared to the South, his legacy is relatively depreciated as a struggle to protect the "feudalist throne" and the yangban landlord class.

== Cultural depictions ==
=== Film and television ===
Yi's life has been depicted in two motion pictures entitled Seong-ung Yi Sun-sin ("The Saintly Hero Yi Sun-sin"). The first is a 1962 black-and-white movie, and the second, based upon his war diaries, was made in color in 1971.

A 2005 Korean film, Heaven's Soldiers directed by Min Joon-ki, portrayed a young Yi Sun-sin fighting the Jurchen tribes, along with local villagers and North and South Korean soldiers who traveled in time, from 2005 to 1572, with Halley's Comet. Unusually, the film presented Yi as a cunning, slightly eccentric young man, rather than a distinguished austere hero, a couple of decades before Imjin war. Some historical events were also distorted: most notably Yi's campaign against the Jurchens, which did not happen in 1572 but a few years later, after his 1576 military examination. The film, financed with a comfortable budget by Korean standards ($7–8 million), was a relative commercial success in 2005. The film's theme clearly uses the figure of Yi, venerated as a hero in both parts of present-day Korea, to plead for Korean reunification.

From September 4, 2004, to August 28, 2005, a 104-episode drama series was aired on KBS. The show, titled Immortal Admiral Yi Sun-sin, dealt mostly with the events related to the Japanese invasions of Korea, as well as the life of the admiral. It became a popular drama in China and was re-aired in certain ethnic channels in the United States as well. The drama was criticized for the many artistic licenses taken, such as depicting Yi as weak and lonely in his early life and taking liberties with the events surrounding his death. On the other hand, many people complimented the way the drama portrayed him with a more human touch. It described the admiral as a true man who had to overcome many dangers and difficulties quite frequently alone, not just a hero among the clouds. This drama was a heated topic at the time since it overlapped with rising tensions in the ongoing Liancourt Rocks dispute; the series further strained relations between South Korea and Japan in the issue's most recent outbreak.

Film director Kim Han-min created a film trilogy about battles led by Yi Sun-sin. The first film, The Admiral: Roaring Currents (2014) revolves around the events of the Battle of Myeongnyang and it became the most-watched film in South Korean history, attracting 17 million movie-goers. The second film Hansan: Rising Dragon (2022), is based on the Battle of Hansan Island. The third film Noryang: Deadly Sea (2023), depicts the Battle of Noryang.

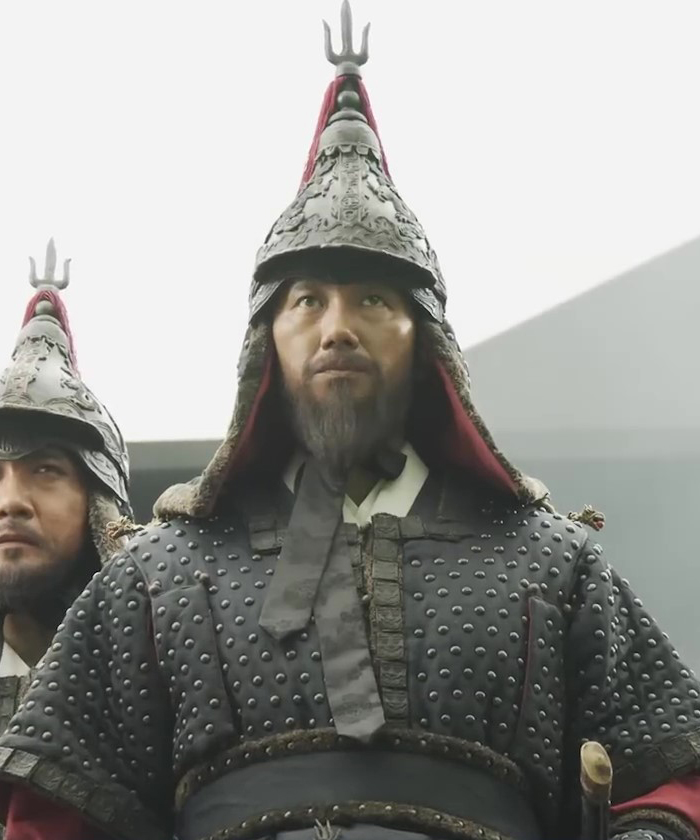
Park Hae-il as Yi Sun-sin in Hansan: Rising Dragon (2022)

==== Actors who have played Yi Sun-sin ====
- Park Joong-hoon in the 2005 film Heaven's Soldiers.
- Kim Myung-min in the 2004–2005 KBS1 TV series Immortal Admiral Yi Sun-sin.
- Yoo Dong-geun in the 2013 MBC TV series Gu Family Book.
- Choi Min-sik in the 2014 film The Admiral: Roaring Currents.
- Park Hae-il in the 2022 film Hansan: Rising Dragon.
- Kim Yoon-seok in the 2023 film Noryang: Deadly Sea.

=== Literature ===
- Yi also inspired literary works. In 2001, Kim Hoon's first novel, Song of the Sword, was a commercial and critical success in South Korea. In his book, the journalist-turned-novelist describes that Yi deliberately stood at the front of his ship in his final battle making himself a target for Japanese gunmen, thinking that ending his life in this honorable fashion could be better than facing another political ploys which was likely to wait him in the Joseon royal court after the war. For this poetic first-person narrative written from Yi's perspective, he received the Dongin Literature Award, the most prestigious literary prize in the nation.

=== Comics ===
- Yi appears as the titular protagonist of a history fiction graphic novel series, produced by Onrie Kompan Productions since 2009.

=== Video games ===
- Yi Sun-Sin is a playable character in the video game Mobile Legends: Bang Bang.
- A game scenario in which the player can assume Yi's role is featured in the Age of Empires II extension pack The Conquerors.
- Yi Sun-Sin is a playable character in the Mobile/PC Game Rise of Kingdoms.
- A game campaign in which the player can assume Yi's role is featured in the Empires: Dawn of the Modern World.
- Yi Sun-Sin appears as a Great Admiral in Sid Meier's Civilization VI.
- Yi Sun-Sin appears as a leader in Civilization VII as part of the Brush and Blade Collection.

== Family ==
- Father: Yi Jeong (이정; July 1511 – November 15, 1583), Internal Prince Deokyeon (덕연부원군; 德淵府院君)
- Mother: Lady Byeon of the Chogye Byeon clan (정경부인 초계 변씨; 1515–1597)
- Sibling(s):
  - Older brother: Yi Hui-sin (이희신)
  - Older brother: Yi Yo-sin (이요신)
  - Younger brother: Yi Woo-sin (이우신)
- Wives and issue(s):
1. Wife: Lady Bang of the Onyang Bang clan (정경부인 온양 방씨); Bang Jin (방진)'s daughter
  1. Son: Yi Hoe (이회; 1567–1625)
  2. Son: Yi Yeol (이열)
  3. Son: Yi Myeon (이면; 1577–1597)
  4. Daughter: Lady Yi of the Deoksu Yi clan (덕수 이씨); married Hong Bi (홍비), Hong Ga-sin (홍가신)'s son
2. Concubine: Lady Oh of the Haeju Oh clan (해주 오씨)
  1. Son: Yi Hun (이훈; b. 1569)
  2. Son: Yi Sin (이신; b. 1574)
  3. Daughter: Lady Yi of the Deoksu Yi clan (덕수 이씨); married Im Jin (임진)
  4. Daughter: Lady Yi of the Deoksu Yi clan (덕수 이씨); married Yun Hyo-jeon (윤효전)
3. Concubine: Lady Buandaek (부안댁) – No issue.

== See also ==
- History of Korea
- Naval history of Korea
  - Joseon Navy
- Joseon Army
- Turtle ship
- Immortal Admiral Yi Sun-sin
- Nanjung ilgi, War Diary of Admiral Yi Sun-sin
- Chen Lin (Yi's fellow ally and comrade who fought alongside and brought news of his battles and death to China)
