= Wŏn Kyun =

Korean naval commander (1540–1597)

- Born: 12 February 1540; Nari, Yeobang-myeon, Jinwi-hyeon, Gyeonggi Province, Joseon (now Dongil-dong, Pyeongtaek, Gyeonggi Province, South Korea)
- Died: 27 August 1597 (aged 57); Chilcheollyang, Geoje-myeon, Geoje County, South Gyeongsang Province, Geoje Island, Joseon
- Military career
- Allegiance: Joseon Korea
- Conflicts: Japanese invasions of Korea (1592–98): Battle of Okpo; Battle of Sacheon (1592); Battle of Hansan Island; Battle of Busan (1592); Battle of Chilchonryang †

Korean name
- Hangul: 원균
- Hanja: 元均
- RR: Won Gyun
- MR: Wŏn Kyun

Art name
- Hangul: 평중
- Hanja: 平仲
- RR: Pyeongjung
- MR: P'yŏngjung

Wŏn Kyun (Korean: 원균; Hanja: 元均; 12 February 1540 – 27 August 1597) was a military commander during the Imjin War. At the time of the Japanese invasion, he was the Naval Commander of Gyeongsang Right Province and led the navy, defeating the Japanese fleet together with Yi Sun-sin (李舜臣), the Naval Commander of Jeolla Left Province, and Yi Eok-gi (李億祺), the Naval Commander of Jeolla Right Province. He later served as Commander of Chungcheong Province, Naval Commander of Jeolla Left Province, and during the second invasion (the Jeongyu War), replaced Yi Sun-sin as Commander-in-Chief of the Three Provinces Navy (삼도수군통제사, Samdo Sugun Tongjesa). However, he suffered a disastrous defeat and was killed in the Battle of Chilcheollyang.

== Early life ==
Won Gyun (元均) was born on January 5, 1540 (the 35th year of King Jungjong's reign) in Pyeongtaek, the eldest son of Won Jun-ryang (원준량). His family origin (bon-gwan) was in Wonju, and his courtesy name was Pyeongjung (평중, 平仲). His brothers included Won Yeon (원연), who raised a righteous army during the Imjin War as a licentiate (jin-sa), and also Won Yong (원용), Won Jeon (원전), and Won Ji (원지). His son was Won Sa-ung (원사웅). His father, Won Jun-ryang, was a military official who rose through posts such as Seonjeongwan (Royal Guards officer), Naval Commander of Jeolla Right Province, Naval Commander of Gyeongsang Left Province, Commander of Gyeongsang Left Province, and Naval Commander of Jeolla Left Province. During his service he was impeached several times by the Office of Censors.

== Early Military Career ==
At age 28, in 1567 (the first year of King Seonjo’s reign), Won Gyun passed the military examination (mukwa) with second place in the secondary tier (eulgwa) and began his government career, first serving as Seonjeongwan (royal guard officer) before being appointed Manho (fort commander) of Joseon.

During this period, he distinguished himself in campaigns against the Jurchens and was promoted to magistrate of Buryeong. He later became magistrate of Jongseong and, at age 49 in 1588, participated in the punitive expedition against the Sijeon tribal villages under Northern Commander Yi Il (李鎰).

After this, Won Gyun's theater of operations shifted south. At the time, Toyotomi Hideyoshi, having unified Japan, showed signs of invading Joseon. From early 1591 (24th year of Seonjo), Joseon began building fortresses in strategic areas and deploying experienced commanders southward. Won Gyun was included as one of these southern defense generals. He was appointed Naval Commander of Jeolla Left Province in 1591, skipping normal rank progression. However, since his previous performance evaluations as a magistrate had been rated poor (居下), his appointment after only half a year drew criticism, and the Office of Remonstrance impeached him, leading to dismissal. Instead, in early 1592 he was appointed Naval Commander of Gyeongsang Right Province.

== Imjin War ==
On April 13, 1592, the Japanese army launched a massive invasion. Siege of Busanjin and Siege of Dongae quickly fell under overwhelming force. Because of the overwhelming disparity in war preparations between Joseon and Japan, Joseon forces suffered continuous defeats from the very beginning. Local officials fled, commoners took refuge in the mountains, and towns were left deserted. Gyeongsang Left Army Commander Yi Gak abandoned the defense of Dongnae fortress and fled, while Gyeongsang Left Naval Commander Park Hong failed to rally his fleet and abandoned his base.

Won Gyun, as Gyeongsang Right Naval Commander, also failed to respond properly in the opening stage. He hastily set out with his warships but could not assemble his full forces. He left his base to deputy commander (우후) U Eung-jin, ordering him to burn the government granaries, while he withdrew with only four ships and several subordinate commanders to Gonyang harbor. This collapse effectively destroyed the defensive network of his naval district. Though he had less time than Yi Sun-sin to prepare his fleet, the failure to gather his forces was clearly his responsibility.

He attempted to land at Namhae County to escape the Japanese but, on the advice of Yi Un-ryong, he sent Yi Yeong-nam to request reinforcements from Yi Sun-sin. Won Gyun then moved to Hansan Island, and on May 6 boarded a single panokseon (판옥선, large warship) to join Yi Sun-sin. Around this time, many of his subordinate commanders, each with their own vessels, also joined Yi's fleet. In total, Won Gyun contributed only three panokseon and two small warships. In comparison, Yi Sun-sin's fleet had 28 panokseon and 17 smaller ships.

Together they fought in the Battles of Okpo, Happo, and Jeokjinpo, where the allied fleets dealt heavy blows to the Japanese navy. Although his contingent was small, Won Gyun's subordinates fought bravely, sinking enemy ships. Later, in May and June, the combined fleets launched multiple expeditions, winning the Battles of Sacheon, Dangpo, Danghangpo, Yulpo, Hansando (Hansan Island), and Angolpo. Gradually, Won Gyun's fleet, though still secondary, began to function as a coherent unit again under his command.

In August, the combined navy launched its fourth major expedition, culminating in the Battle of Busan on September 1, where 470 Japanese ships were engaged and over 100 destroyed. Won Gyun's contingent also contributed. For his role, he was promoted to the rank of Senior Second Grade (嘉善大夫), while Yi Sun-sin was elevated to higher rank.

=== Conflict with Yi Sun-sin and Royal Favor ===
In 1593, Won Gyun continued to serve as Gyeongsang Right Naval Commander. Despite hardships from famine and disease, he participated in operations alongside Yi Sun-sin and Yi Eok-gi, including the Second Battle of Danghangpo, where he personally destroyed two Japanese medium ships.

But from the beginning, tensions with Yi Sun-sin grew. Wŏn Kyun is perhaps best known for his personal faults, which included excessive alcohol consumption and attempts at adultery. Yi's Nanjung Ilgi (War Diary) records about 30 incidents between 1593 and 1594 showing mistrust and misconduct by Won Gyun. Yi Sun-Sin recalls reports and rumors about "cruel deeds" committed by Wŏn including seizing enemy ships captured by Yi's men, mishandling prisoners, making false reports, neglecting allies, and sending misleading military dispatches. Even Won Gyun's subordinates reported his misconduct to Yi Sun-sin such as an incident in which Wŏn had attempted to seduce one of his subordinates' wives, calling him a "wicked man" and (at least partially) blaming him for his degradation ("Wŏn employs all means to entrap me").

Won Gyun also resented Yi Sun-sin personally. He was five years older and had seniority, but Yi was promoted above him. When Yi was appointed Commander-in-Chief of the Three Provinces Navy in late 1593, becoming Won Gyun's superior, Won's bitterness deepened.

Although many in the court, including King Seonjo and high-ranking officials such as Yun Du-su and Yun Geun-su, praised Won Gyun as brave and useful, Yi's mistrust grew. Eventually, Won Gyun was reassigned as Commander of Chungcheong Province, effectively removed from the navy. As Chungcheong Commander, he was impeached for corruption and brutality, but Seonjo shielded him, valuing his martial talent. Even in these posts, he submitted several proposals for naval operations to the court. Later, when Yi Mong-hak’s rebellion broke out in 1596, Won Gyun was again entrusted with high command, showing Seonjo's continuing trust in him. Seonjo increasingly doubted Yi Sun-sin, accusing him of inaction, while praising Won Gyun as diligent and fearless, though others warned he lacked the ability to command. Still, Seonjo favored him as a potential replacement for Yi.

By late 1596, peace negotiations had collapsed, and another invasion (Jeongyu War) was imminent. Pro-war ministers including Yun Du-su and Kim Eung-nam pushed for Won Gyun's reinstatement. Misled by Japanese misinformation about Katō Kiyomasa's crossing, the court blamed Yi Sun-sin for failing to intercept, and Seonjo used the incident to arrest Yi and replace him with Won Gyun.

=== Defeat at Chilcheollyang ===
As Commander-in-Chief, Won Gyun rejoiced at Yi's downfall but lacked strategic vision. Though brave in personal combat, his reckless nature made him a poor leader. He quarreled with subordinates and failed to maintain discipline. Forced into battle by court pressure, Won Gyun led the fleet into several costly encounters in mid-1597, suffering attrition and loss of ships. Finally, on July 14–16, his fleet of over 100 ships was caught by surprise at Chilcheollyang by a massive Japanese force. Exhausted, poorly disciplined, and unprepared, the Joseon navy collapsed. Most ships and men were destroyed including Yi Eok-gi (Naval Commander of Jeolla Right Province) and Choi Ho (Naval Commander of Chungcheong Province).

Wŏn was considered to be killed in action at Chuwonpo while running away, when his brother was killed during this battle. He was 57 years old. From over 130 warships and 13,000 men, only the small detachment of twelve warships under the command of admiral Pae Sŏl – who refused to participate and fled even before the battle began – survived. Every other ship in the combat was destroyed or disabled, along with almost all of the Joseon navy line officers and many capable mid-level commanders.

The battle opened the route for the Japanese to advance to the Yellow Sea threatening Jeolla Province directly, and Todo devised a plan to attack Hanyang from land and sea with Katō Kiyomasa and Konishi Yukinaga. However, Japan's hopes were crushed again by Yi Sun-sin's return at the Battle of Myeongnyang, which would decide the winner of the devastating war.

== Legacy ==
Although Seonjo attempted to shift blame of defeat to fate rather than to Won Gyun alone, much controversy lingers in regard to Wŏn Kyun as a military leader. Won Gyun bore chief responsibility: poor discipline, neglect of basic precautions, and failure of leadership. Throughout the late Joseon dynasty, Won Gyun was unfavorably compared to Yi Sun-sin. While circumstances limited his options, his poor decisions and lack of leadership led to disaster. Though brave, his failure to adapt and his fatal misjudgments at Chilcheollyang sealed his legacy as a tragic commander responsible for the navy's greatest defeat. Despite any historical controversy, Wŏn Kyun and Yi Sun-sin received commendations following their deaths. In 1604, Won Gyun was posthumously recognized alongside Yi Sun-sin and Gwon Yul as a First-Rank Meritorious Subject of National Defense (宣武功臣), and was also awarded the title of Left State Councilor and Head of the Royal Tribunal, as well as ennobled as Lord of Wonreung.

In 1605, the king issued a posthumous eulogy for him, and later, during King Sukjong's reign, the Minister of Inspection Kim Gan wrote his official epitaph.

Widely panned by scholars and historians, there is recent research to suggest that Wŏn Kyun may have been excessively vilified during the Park Chung Hee administration to elevate Yi Sun-sin by juxtaposition. In particular, Wŏn Kyun's earlier successes against the Jurchens have been buried and there is an interest in providing a more objective view of Wŏn Kyun's military career.

While fault exists for Wŏn Kyun's mistakes as a naval officer, much of the blame of the troubles during that period lies in the factionalized incompetence of the royal court. However, it is still hard to ignore his actions and lack of competency as a naval commander, and blame the political instability and indecision of the royal court for the result of the battle of Chilcheonryang. The battle led to the near-complete annihilation of the Korean navy in a single engagement against the Japanese, who had previously been unable to prevail against the Koreans in naval engagements. Some explain his legacy of poor command to be an unfortunate byproduct of comparison with his more successful associate, Yi Sun-sin.

== Family ==
=== Parents ===
- Father – Wŏn Chun-nyang (원준량; 元俊良), Internal Prince Pyeongwon (평원부원군; 18 December 1510 – 27 January ?)
- Mother – Lady Yang of the Namwon Yang clan (남원 양씨; 1510–?)

=== Siblings ===
- Younger brother – Wŏn Yŏn (원연; 元埏; 1543–1597); became the adoptive son of his uncle Wŏn Su-ryang (원수량; 元遂良)
- Younger brother – Wŏn Chŏn (원전; 元塼) or Wŏn O (원오; 元墺; 1545–1597)
- Younger brother – Wŏn Yong (원용; 元墉) or Wŏn Hun (원훈; 元塤; 1546–?)
- Younger sister – Lady Wŏn of the Wonju Wŏn clan (원씨; 1550–?)
- Younger brother – Wŏn Chi (원지; 元地; 1552–?)
- Younger brother – Wŏn Kon (원곤; 元坤; 1554–?)
- Younger brother – Wŏn Kam (원감; 元堪; 1556–?)
- Younger brother – Wŏn Hae (원해; 元垓; 1558–?)

=== Wives and issues ===
- Yun Ch'a-sim (윤차심; 尹次深), Lady Yun of the Papyeong Yun clan (정경부인 파평 윤씨; 1546 – 16 September 1642)
  - Son – Wŏn Sa-ung (원사웅; 元士雄; 1575–1646)
  - Daughter – Lady Wŏn of the Wonju Wŏn clan (원주 원씨; 1585–?)
  - Daughter – Lady Wŏn of the Wonju Wŏn clan (원주 원씨; 1587–?)
  - Daughter – Lady Wŏn of the Wonju Wŏn clan (원주 원씨; 1590–?)
  - Daughter – Lady Wŏn of the Wonju Wŏn clan (원주 원씨; 1593–?)
- Unnamed concubine (1550–?)
  - Daughter – Won Jeong-il (원정일, 元貞一), Lady Wŏn of the Wonju Wŏn clan (원주 원씨; 1 January 1589 – 24 January 1637)
- Unnamed concubine (1545–?) — no issue.

== In popular culture ==
=== Film and television ===
- Portrayed by Choi Jae-sung in the 2004–2005 KBS1 TV series Immortal Admiral Yi Sun-sin.
- Portrayed by Son Hyun-joo in the 2022 film Hansan: Rising Dragon.

=== Comics ===
- In Yi Soon Shin: Warrior and Defender, as one of Yi's adversaries.

=== Video games ===
In the Admiral Yi campaign of the video game Empires: Dawn of the Modern World, Wŏn Kyun is portrayed as a traitor to Korea, allying first with Manchu raiders harassing Korea's north and later with the Japanese invaders. In this portrayal, Wŏn Kyun appears to be responsible for masterminding both attacks on Korea, with the eventual aim of becoming King of a reduced Korea, allied to Japan and a tributary to Ming China. His treachery is discovered by Yu Sŏngnyong, and he is arrested.

== See also ==
- History of Korea
- Naval history of Korea
- Hideyoshi's invasions of Korea
