= Immortal Admiral Yi Sun-sin =

2004–2005 South Korean television series

- Promotional poster
- Also known as: The Immortal Yi Soon-shin
- Hangul: 불멸의 이순신
- Hanja: 不滅의 李舜臣
- Lit.: The Immortal Yi Sun-sin
- RR: Bulmyeorui I Sunsin
- MR: Pulmyŏrŭi I Sunsin
- Genre: Period drama Drama; War
- Based on: The Immortal Yi Sun-sin by Kim Takhwan
- Written by: Yoon Sun-joo; Kim Tae-hee
- Directed by: Lee Sung-joo; Kim Jung-gyu
- Starring: Kim Myung-min; Choi Jae-sung; Lee Jae-ryong; Choi Cheol-ho
- Country of origin: South Korea
- No. of episodes: 104

Production
- Producer: Jung Young-chul
- Camera setup: Multi-camera
- Running time: Saturdays and Sundays at 21:45 (KST)
- Production company: KBS Drama Production Bureau
- Budget: ₩35 billion

Original release
- Network: Korean Broadcasting System
- Release: September 4, 2004 – August 28, 2005

Immortal Admiral Yi Sun-sin (Korean: 불멸의 이순신) is a South Korean television series based on the life of Yi Sun-sin, a Korean admiral famed for his victories against the Japanese navy during the Imjin war in the Joseon period.

The series, starring Kim Myung-min in the title role, aired on KBS1 on Saturdays and Sundays at 21:45 from September 4, 2004 to August 28, 2005 for 104 episodes.

The series filmed on location at the actual battle sites. It made extensive use of rendered images and a reconstruction of a turtle ship. Due to the preparation needed, the show took many months to produce.

== Plot ==
Immortal Admiral Yi Sun-sin is structured as a sweeping historical epic told largely in flashback. The drama opens in late 1598, on the eve of the Battle of Noryang, as Admiral Yi Sun-sin prepares for what will become his final engagement. As he lies fatally wounded aboard his flagship, the narrative reaches back to trace the full arc of his life — his childhood, his rise through the military ranks, the catastrophic Japanese invasions, his disgrace and imprisonment, his reinstatement, and his ultimate sacrifice.

=== Early Life and Formation (Episodes 1–15) ===
The drama begins with Yi Sun-sin's boyhood in the mid-16th century during the reign of the Joseon dynasty. Unlike the traditional heroic portrayal, the series depicts young Yi (played by Yoo Seung-ho) as a quiet, introspective, and physically unimpressive child — shy and often bullied — yet one who cannot look away from injustice around him. He witnesses the suffering of commoners at the hands of corrupt officials and aristocratic landlords, and these early experiences plant the seeds of his unwavering moral compass.

A central friendship of the drama is forged during this period: Yi Sun-sin and Won Gyun meet as young men and develop a deep bond rooted in mutual respect. Won Gyun is depicted as bold, fiercely capable, and hot-tempered — a warrior who becomes something of an older-brother figure to the more reserved Yi. This relationship will later become one of the drama's most tragic threads.

Yi also encounters Yu Seong-ryong, who becomes Prime Minister, as a young scholar. Their friendship across the civilian-military divide will prove crucial during the darkest years of the Japanese invasion.

Yi's path to becoming a military officer is arduous. He fails his military examination the first time due to a horse-riding accident and must persevere through years of hardship before finally passing on a later attempt.

=== Military Career and the Calm Before the Storm (Episodes 16–35) ===
Having passed his military examinations, Yi Sun-sin begins his career as a low-ranking military officer stationed on the northern frontier, where Joseon faced periodic raids from Jurchen tribes. These postings, far from the court's political intrigue, are where Yi first demonstrates his tactical ingenuity and genuine care for his soldiers and the civilians under his protection.

However, the Joseon court is consumed by factional warfare between the Easterners and Westerners — rival political camps whose infighting paralyzes governance and leaves the kingdom dangerously unprepared for external threats. Yi's superiors repeatedly block his promotions and have him falsely accused and demoted on multiple occasions. Yi endures these injustices with stoic dignity, refusing to play political games even when urged to do so by allies.

Yu Seong-ryong, now a powerful minister at court, maneuvers Yi's appointment as Commander of the Left Jeolla Naval District — a post considered a backwater assignment at a time when the navy was held in low esteem by the Joseon court and military establishment. Yi arrives to find a demoralized, ill-equipped naval force and crumbling fortifications. He sets about reforming every aspect of the command: instituting rigorous training regimens, fortifying coastal positions, improving provisioning and logistics, and driving innovation in naval technology. This effort culminates in the development of the Geobukseon (turtle ship), an ironclad warship conceived by Yi to overcome the threat of Japanese arquebuses and fire weapons. Yi works closely with the naval engineer Na Dae-yong, pushing the limits of contemporary shipbuilding to produce a vessel capable of ramming enemy formations while remaining largely impervious to return fire.

During this period, Won Gyun commands a neighboring naval district. Their relationship remains warm but begins to show the first signs of strain — Won Gyun's blunt, aggressive command style chafes against Yi's methodical preparations, and Won Gyun begins to bridle at what he perceives as Yi's excessive caution.

Intelligence from Japan grows increasingly alarming. Toyotomi Hideyoshi, who has unified Japan after decades of civil war, makes no secret of his ambitions to conquer Korea and China. Yet the Joseon court remains paralyzed by denial and factional bickering, and King Seonjo takes no meaningful steps to prepare.

=== The Japanese Invasion — Imjin War, First Phase (Episodes 36–58) ===
In the spring of 1592, the Japanese invasion force under generals including Konishi Yukinaga and Katō Kiyomasa lands on the southern coast of Korea in overwhelming numbers. Joseon's land forces collapse with shocking speed. Busan falls within a day. King Seonjo flees Seoul and eventually retreats as far north as the Yalu River, abandoning his capital and his people. In the vacuum left by the retreating Joseon army, Japanese occupation forces exact reprisals on the civilian population — villages are burned, people are conscripted into forced labor, and massacres are carried out across the southern provinces.

At sea, however, Yi Sun-sin launches a series of devastating attacks on Japanese supply lines. At the Battle of Okpo, Yi's fleet achieves its first significant victory, destroying dozens of Japanese vessels without losing a single ship. At Sacheon, the turtle ship is deployed in combat for the first time, its iron-plated hull impervious to Japanese arquebuses and fire arrows. Yi's fleet dismantles Japanese naval power in battle after battle — Dangpo, Danghanpo, and Hansando — severing the sea lanes that Hideyoshi's armies depend upon for resupply. The Battle of Hansando sees Yi deploy a "crane wing" formation to encircle and annihilate the Japanese fleet under Wakisaka Yasuharu, effectively cutting Japanese naval supremacy and forcing their land advance to stall.

Won Gyun's naval forces, operating in an adjacent command, achieve some victories but also suffer setbacks due to his more reckless tactics. The growing contrast between the two commanders' approaches becomes a recurring source of conflict between them.

Korean resistance fighters (uibyeong, or righteous armies) meanwhile rise throughout the countryside, and Buddhist monk-soldiers take up arms against the occupation. The war on land grinds on in a cycle of Japanese advances, Korean guerrilla resistance, and the first arrivals of Ming Chinese reinforcements — whose generals pursue their own political and material interests, often at the expense of the Joseon forces they nominally support.

=== Court Intrigues and Yi's Disgrace (Episodes 59–74) ===
With Ming dynasty forces entering the war and the Japanese advance stalled, ceasefire negotiations between Japan and China begin — much to Yi's frustration. Yi and Yu Seong-ryong both understand that Hideyoshi has not abandoned his ambitions and that the ceasefire is merely a tactical pause. At court, however, the factions maneuver for advantage in the anticipated post-war political landscape.

Yi Sun-sin's naval victories had made him enormously popular among the then Korean people — and this popularity made him a threat in the eyes of King Seonjo. Court enemies, including Yun Doo-su and rival factions, pressed accusations of insubordination and disloyalty against Yi, and framed his military independence as a challenge to royal authority.

Won Gyun, by now consumed by professional jealousy and resentful of Yi's reputation, lends his voice to these accusations. He submits formal charges to the court alleging that Yi failed to engage the enemy on royal orders, acted without sanction, and harbored treasonous ambitions. King Seonjo orders Yi Sun-sin arrested, stripped of his rank, and subjected to torture. Yu Seong-ryong, Yi's most powerful ally at court, is unable to prevent the sentence and can only succeed in saving Yi from execution. Yi is released and demoted to the rank of common foot soldier, required to serve under the very commander who had him condemned.

=== The Chilcheollyang Disaster and Reinstatement (Episodes 75–87) ===
With Yi removed from command, Won Gyun is appointed Supreme Naval Commander. In 1597, Japan launches its second invasion. Won Gyun, dismissing warnings and intelligence from his subordinates, leads the Joseon fleet into a catastrophic ambush at the Battle of Chilcheollyang. The fleet is almost entirely destroyed. Won Gyun is killed in the battle. The southern coastal provinces fall back under Japanese control, and atrocities against civilians resume — this time compounded by tensions with Ming allied forces, whose soldiers also commit abuses against the local population as they move through occupied territory.

With the fleet annihilated and Japanese forces advancing again, King Seonjo reinstates Yi Sun-sin. Yi is restored to the rank of Admiral and given command of what remains of Joseon's naval forces — twelve ships and approximately 200 surviving sailors.

=== The Miracle at Myeongnyang and the Final Campaign (Episodes 88–102) ===
In October 1597, Yi faces the Battle of Myeongnyang. With only 12 ships against a Japanese fleet of over 300, Yi anchors in the narrow tidal strait of Myeongnyang and waits. When the Japanese fleet enters the channel, the reversing current throws their formation into chaos. Yi's ships, positioned to exploit the current, inflict devastating losses on the Japanese fleet, sinking dozens of vessels while suffering none themselves. Yi stands at the bow of the lead ship throughout the engagement, refusing to take cover.

Following Myeongnyang, Yi rebuilds the Joseon fleet through requisitioning, conscription of shipwrights, and the rallying of scattered naval survivors. Toyotomi Hideyoshi's death in September 1598 triggers a Japanese decision to withdraw from Korea. Yi moves to intercept the withdrawing forces, unwilling to allow the armies that devastated the Korean peninsula to depart without consequence.

=== The Battle of Noryang and Yi's Death (Episodes 103–104) ===
In late 1598, Yi prepares to intercept the Japanese withdrawal fleet at the straits of Noryang. Ming Chinese Admiral Chen Lin's commanders have secretly agreed to allow the Japanese safe passage in exchange for payment, and Chen Lin initially refuses to commit his fleet to the engagement. Yi confronts Chen Lin directly, and the Ming fleet ultimately joins the battle.

On November 19, 1598, the combined Joseon-Ming fleet engages the retreating Japanese fleet in the straits of Noryang before dawn. The Japanese suffer crippling losses. During the battle, Admiral Yi is struck by a Japanese arquebus bullet. He orders his nephew Yi Wan and his bodyguard to conceal his condition and continue beating the war drums so that the fleet will not lose heart. He dies before the battle ends, as the last Japanese ships break and flee. His final instruction — that his death not be announced until victory is secured — is carried out.

In the aftermath, Yu Seong-ryong receives news of Yi's death. King Seonjo, who had imprisoned and humiliated the man who saved his kingdom, is left to confront that legacy. The Imjin War ends with Korea surviving but devastated — its population reduced, its land scorched, and its most capable defender gone.

== Cast ==
=== Main characters ===
- Kim Myung-min as Yi Sun-sin
  - Yoo Seung-ho as young Sun-sin
- Choi Jae-sung as Won Gyun
- Lee Jae-ryong as Yu Seong-ryong, Prime Minister of Joseon
- Choi Cheol-ho as King Seonjo
- Kim Kyu-chul as Im Chun-soo

=== Supporting characters ===
- Choi Sung-joon as Yi Eok-gi
- Choi Yoo-jung as Bang Yeon-hwa
- Kim Gyu-ri as Park Mi-jin/Park Cho-hee
- Park Dong-bin as Han Ho
- Jeon Ye-seo as Chung-hyang
- Lee Han-wi as Chun Moo-jik
- Ahn Yeon-hong as Hong-yi
- Lee Han-gal as Nal-bal, Yi Sun-Sin's bodyguard
- Jung Ae-ri as Yi Sun-sin's mother
- Ahn Hong-jin as Yi Wan, Yi Sun-Sin's nephew
- Son Jong-beom as So Ŭn-woo
- Lee In (Note: Credited as Lee Joon.) as Prince Gwanghae
- Gi Ju-bong as Yoon Hwan-shi, a young officer promoted by Yi to the post of naval engineer
- Kim Joon-mo as Yi San-hae
- Jung Dong-hwan as Yun Doo-su
- Lee Won-bal as Yun Geun-su
- Im Hyuk-joo as Jeong Tak
- Hwang Joon-wook as Yi Deok-hyung
- Park Chan-hwan as Kwon Joon
- Ahn Sŭng-hun as Jung Woon
- Jung Jin-gak as Shin Ho
- Jeon Hyun as Yi Sun-sin (born 1554)
- Park Chul-min as Kim Wan
- Kim Myung-gook as Song Hui-rip
- Lee Sang-in as Na Dae-yong, inventor of the Geobukseon
- Kim Hong-pyo as Joo Soo-chang
- Park Hye-sook as Neob Chool-nye
- Lee Jae-pyo as Woo Chi-juk
- Choi Joon-young as Lee Woon-ryong
- Yoo Tae-woong as Lee Young-nam
- Lee Il-jae as Yi Il
- Lee Hyo-jung as Toyotomi Hideyoshi
- Lee Jung-yong as Katō Kiyomasa
- Jung Sung-ho as Konishi Yukinaga
- Choi Dong-joon as Tōdō Takatora
- Kim Myung-soo as Wakisaka Yasuharu
- Hwang Joon-won as Sō Yoshitoshi
- Lee Soon-jae as Yi Hwang
- Choi Dang-seok as Sa Hwa-dong
- Kwak Jung-wook as Sen no Rikyū
- Kim Jong-kyeol as Shotai
- Lee Kyung-young as Genso
- Kim Si-won as Kobayakawa Takakage
- Shin Dong-hoon as Nagaoka Tadaoki
- Kim Ha-kyun as Chen Lin
- Song Geum-sik as Hwang Se-deuk
- Kim Ki-doo
- Ko Kyu-pil as Dol Soe
- Yoon Yong-hyun as Woo wul gi nae
- Sun Dong-hyuk as Manni eunggae
- Maeng Ho-rim as Yi Kyung-lok

== Artistic license in the series ==
The drama has been the focus of some attention due to historical inaccuracies, explained away with artistic license, though it concerns some that it may be promoting itself as based on fact.

When Admiral Yi is portrayed as a boy, he is shown to be a weak, shy, and lonely boy though common belief is that he had leadership and creativity at an early age. Nevertheless, he is portrayed to display those qualities as a growing man, unable to avert his eyes from social injustice.

Instead of vilifying Won Gyun, a Korean admiral who contributed to the jailing of Admiral Yi out of jealousy, Won Gyun is portrayed as a strong and smart, but very hot-tempered man who befriends and leads Yi throughout his early life. This deviates from the common belief that Won Gyun had always conspired against Yi. In the show, his jealousy and rivalry is portrayed in his later years as a veteran commander when he begins to show his arrogance as one of Joseon's strongest warriors, refusing to follow along with what he deems to be Yi's cowardly tactics and treachery to the king. His betrayal to Yi is explained through the show's ongoing politics and his inability to distinguish military merits from protection of the people. There is much debate about this positive portrayal of Won Gyun as recent research suggests that he may have been excessively vilified during the Park Chung Hee administration. Reception and reviews have since been positive with much praise for the show's emphasis for humanity and their portrayal of Won Gyun.

== Awards and nominations ==
- 2004 4th KBS Right Language Awards: Kim Myung-min
- 2005 41st Baeksang Arts Awards: Best TV Director - Lee Sung-joo
- 2005 41st Baeksang Arts Awards: Best TV Drama (nominated)
- 2005 41st Baeksang Arts Awards: Best TV Actor - Kim Myung-min (nominated)
- 2005 18th Grimae Awards: Best Actor - Kim Myung-min
- 2005 KBS Drama Awards: Best Supporting Actor - Park Chul-min
- 2005 KBS Drama Awards: Grand Prize (Daesang) - Kim Myung-min
- 2006 18th Producers Awards of Korea: Best Performer - Kim Myung-min
- 2006 33rd Korean Broadcasting Awards: Best TV Actor - Kim Myung-min

== International broadcast ==
The series also aired in the United States and China in 2005 via KBS World.
