= Mu Pai Nai =

Mu Pai Nai was a Jianzhou Jurchen leader who invaded the north of Joseon, but was defeated by Yi Sun-sin and his army in 1583. Right after his capture, he was executed by Yi Sun-sin.
