= Kurushima Michifusa =

Japanese samurai

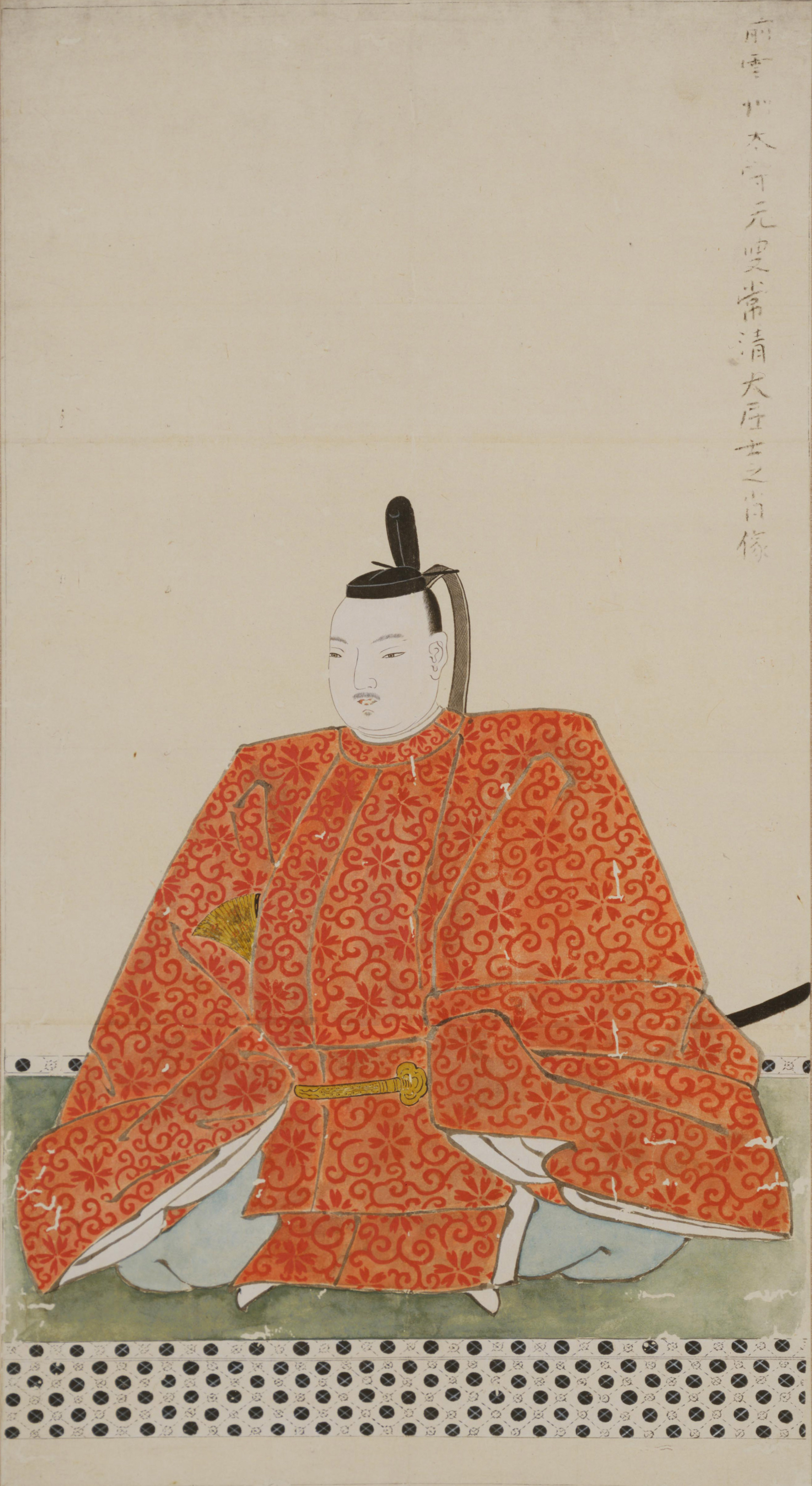

Kurushima Michifusa (来島 通総; 1562 – October 26, 1597) was a Japanese samurai of the late Sengoku period, the 4th son of Murakami Michiyasu (村上 通康), and younger brother of Kurujima Michiyuki. His father was a leader of one of the three Murakami suigun (Murakami navies), major naval powers in the 16th century.

Masamichi belonged to the army corps of Fukushima Masanori in the Seven-Year War. His brother was killed on July 10 at the Battle of Dangpo. Masamichi was killed several months later in the Battle of Myeongnyang by the forces of Yi Sun-sin. He was the only daimyō who was killed in action during the war.

== Modern culture ==
- Portrayed by Ryu Seung-ryong in the 2014 film The Admiral: Roaring Currents.
