= Tomb of Yi Sun-sin =

Tomb in Asan, South Korea

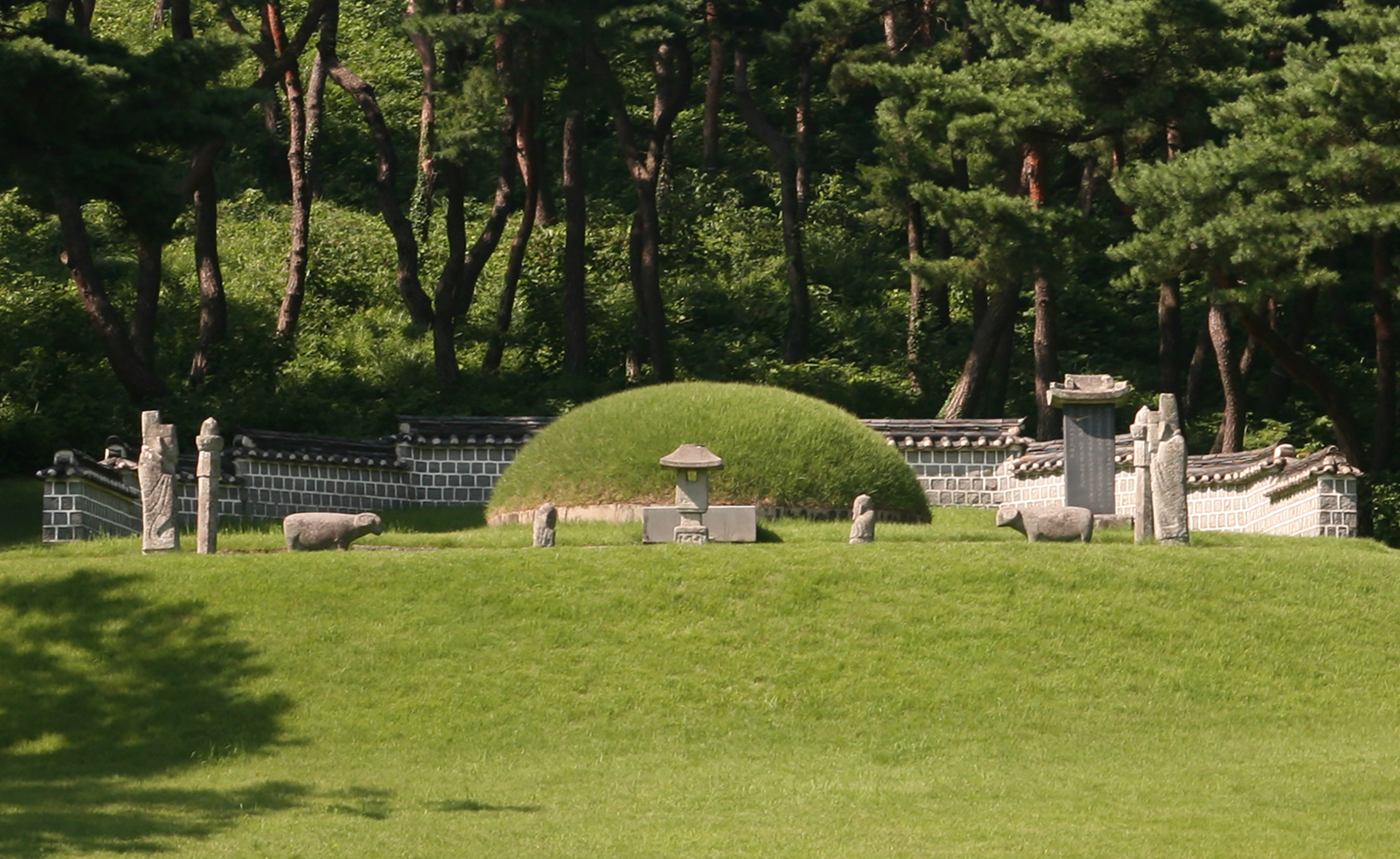
- The tomb (2013)
- Interactive map of Tomb of Yi Sun-sin
- Location: Eumbong-myeon, Asan, South Korea
- Coordinates: 36.8574°N 127.0118°E

Historic Sites of South Korea
- Designated: 1963-01-21
- Reference no.: 112

The tomb of the Korean admiral Yi Sun-sin (Korean: 이충무공묘; Hanja: 李忠武公墓) is located in Eumbong-myeon, Asan, South Korea. On January 21, 1963, it was designated Historic Site of South Korea No. 112.

Yi defended Korea during the 1592–1598 Imjin War and died in combat. Yi was originally buried in his hometown. Sixteen years later, the tomb was moved to its current location. His tomb is circular and has a tumulus over it. Yi and his wife are buried in the tomb. His tombstone is a later addition; it was engraved in 1707 (Korean calendar). The tomb is surrounded by various stone statues and monuments.
