= Yi Soon Shin (comic) =

Graphic novel by Onrie Kompan

YI SOON SHIN (comic)

Publication information
- Publisher: Onrie Kompan Productions
- Genre: war fiction, historical fiction, drama, fantasy comics
- Publication date: 2009

Creative team
- Created by: Onrie Kompan, David Anthony Kraft
- Artist(s): Giovanni Paolo Timpano, El Arnakleus, Adriana De Los Santos
- Letterer: Joel Saavedra
- Editor(s): David Alan Kraft, Chuck Pineau

YI SOON SHIN is a historical fiction fantasy graphic novel comic book by Onrie Kompan, self-published since 2009. The series is based on the true story of Admiral Yi Soon Shin, a Korean naval commander who saved his people from Japanese invasion forces during the Imjin war in the Joseon period (1592–1598). Similarly to 300 by Frank Miller, elements of the story are sensationalized.

Onrie Kompan, comic book artist, at Dragon Con in Atlanta Ga September 6 2026

== Publication history ==
Yi Soon Shin was first released as a 24-page comic book titled Warrior and Defender #1 in December 2009. Over the next two years three additional comic books in the first story arc were released, and subsequently collected in a hardcover graphic novel of the same name in June 2012. The collected graphic novel featured interviews, concept art, and an inspirational foreword written by Stan Lee.

The Fallen Avenger story arc was released on a semi-regular yearly basis. The creators of Yi Soon Shin have confirmed that they intend to release a hard cover graphic novel for the Fallen Avenger story arc once it is completed. Yi Soon Shin has sold over 70,000 copies in the U.S. and Korea to date and is entirely self-published and self-distributed.

== Synopsis ==
Yi Soon Shin is a graphic novel trilogy broken up into three separate story arcs, each containing four chapters. It is based on the true story of Admiral Yi Soon Shin, a Korean naval commander who saved his people from Japanese invasion forces during the Imjin War (1592–1598). Much like the Nazis during the World War II, the Japanese were known for having little remorse for the innocent civilians of Korea. They raped women, enslaved children and killed elders. All that stood against them was one man who could not be defeated in battle.
