= Chogye Byun clan =

Korean clan from South Gyeongsang Province

Chogye Pyone clan
- Country: Korea
- Current region: Hapcheon County
- Founder: Pyŏne
- Connected members: Pyone Yeong-tae; Pyone Yeong-ro; Byun Jin-sub; Byun Yo-han

Chogye Pyone clan (Korean: 초계 변씨; Hanja: 草溪 卞氏) is one of the Korean clans. Their Bon-gwan is in Hapcheon County, South Gyeongsang Province. According to the research held in 2015, the number of Chogye Byun clan's member was 76045. The name of Byun clan came from the fact that Caoshu Zhenduo’s descendant who was a sixth son of King Wen in the Zhou dynasty was awarded the land named Pyŏne (Hanja: 卞). Pyŏne Wŏn (Hanja: 卞源) who worked as the minister of rites (禮部尚書, Lǐbu Shangshu),Public elite Officer hiring examination director during the Tang dynasty period in China was dispatched to Silla having Classic of Filial Piety as one of the Eight Scholars (Hanja: 八學士) in 743. Then, Pyŏne Chŏngsil, a descendant of Pyŏne Wŏn, became the Chogye Pyone clan's founder.

== See also ==
- Korean clan names of foreign origin
