= Battle of Hansan Island =

1592 Japan–Korea naval battle

Coordinates: 34.7622°N 128.5025°E

- Part of Imjin War
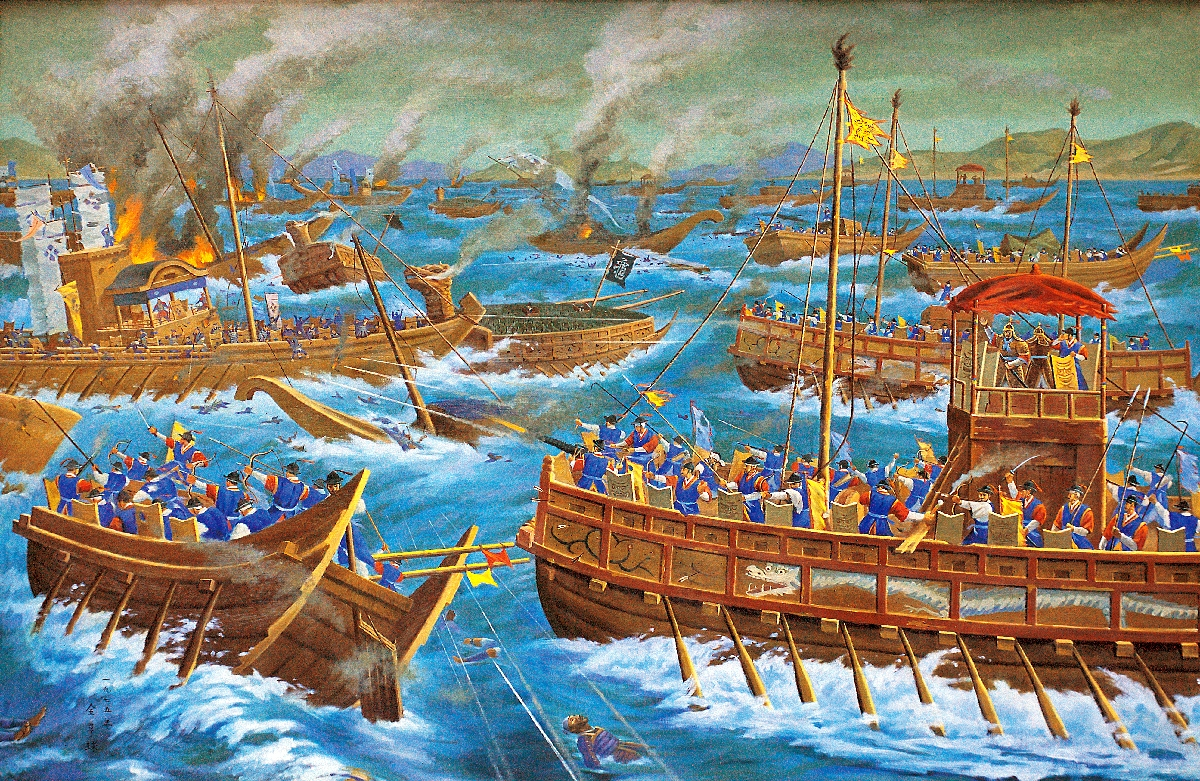
- Imaginary painting depicting the battle
Date	15 August 1592
Location	The eastern coast of Hansan Island
Result	Joseon victory

Belligerents
Fleet of Toyotomi Hideyoshi	Joseon navy

Commanders and leaders
Wakizaka Yasuharu; Kuki Yoshitaka; Kato Yoshiaki	Yi Sun-sin; Yi Ŏkki; Wŏn Kyun

Strength
Hansando: 36 large ships 24 medium vessels 13 small boats Angolpo: 42 ships	56 warships: 3 turtle ships

Casualties and losses
~100 ships	19 dead 114 wounded

- Battle of Hansan Island
- Hangul: 한산도 대첩
- Hanja: 閑山島大捷
- RR: Hansando daecheop
- MR: Hansando taech'ŏp

The Battle of Hansan Island (Korean: 한산도 대첩) and the following engagement at Angolpo took place on 15 August 1592. In two naval encounters, Korean Admiral Yi Sun-sin's fleet managed to destroy roughly 100 Japanese ships and halted Japanese naval operations along the southern coast.

== Background ==
Yi Ŏkki joined with Yi Sun-sin at Yeosu on 10 August, 1592 [Gregorian Calendar]. On 12 August, 1592 [Gregorian Calendar] they rendezvoused with Wŏn Kyun at Noryang, bringing their total fleet strength to 56 warships. At Dangpo, they received news of a Japanese fleet sailing west from Busan. Wakizaka Yasuharu’s fleet of 73 ships entered Gyeonnaeryang.

== Battle ==
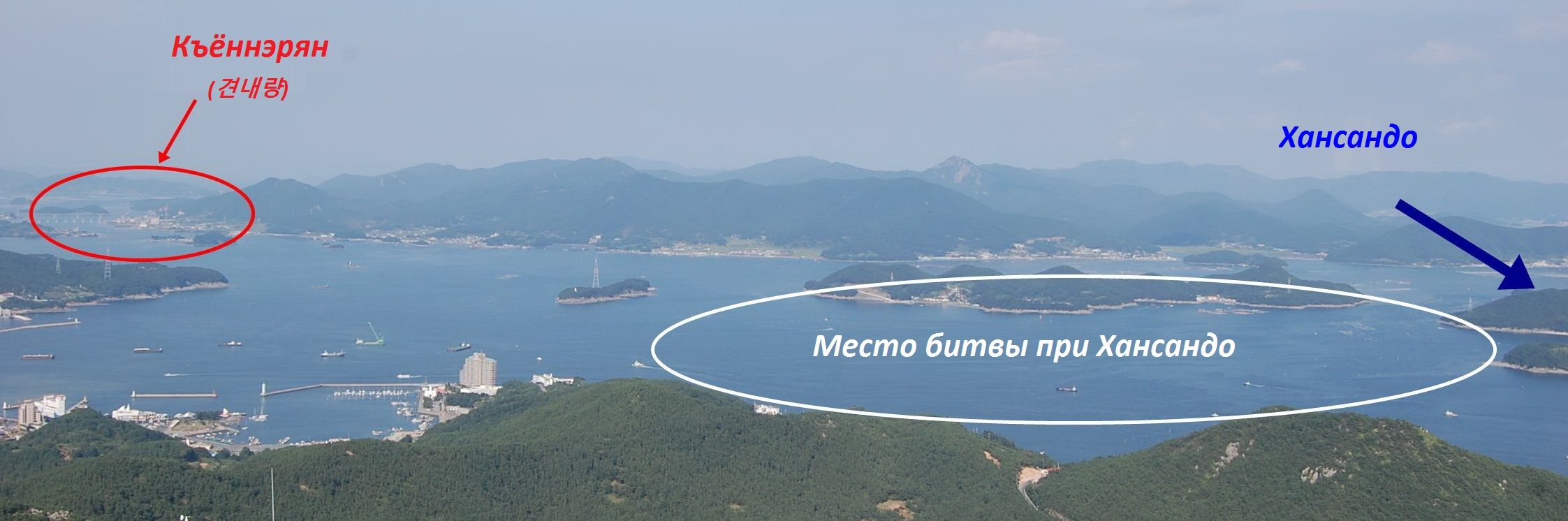
Hansan Island Coastal Sea, where the naval battle took place

On 15 August (8th day of the 7th lunar month), Yi Sun-sin's fleet encountered a Japanese scout vessel and gave chase but broke off after sighting a large fleet of Japanese warships in Gyonnaeryang Strait. Yi Sun-sin sent a small detachment forward to lure the Japanese fleet, and they took the bait, following them into open waters off Hansan Island. The Korean fleet assumed a U-shaped crane formation with large warships such as 2 turtle ships in the center and lighter ships on its wings. The two fleets engaged in battle and most of the Japanese ships were destroyed in the engagement, while Korean reported few losses on their side. The battle lasted throughout the day until the Koreans tired from chasing and returned to open sea. Fourteen Japanese ships that had not engaged in combat escaped, the rest were destroyed. Wakizaka Yasuharu managed to withdraw to Gimhae.

News of the Japanese defeat reached Busan within hours and two Japanese commanders, Kuki Yoshitaka and Kato Yoshiaki, immediately set sail with 42 ships for the port of Angolpo, where they hoped to face the Korean fleet close to shore.

Yi Sun-sin received news of their movements on 15 August and he advanced towards Angolpo to confront them. This time the Japanese were unwilling to follow the Koreans into open water and stayed onshore. They would not take the bait. In response, the Korean fleet moved forwards and bombarded the anchored Japanese fleet for hours until they retreated inland. Later the Japanese returned and escaped on small boats. Both Kuki and Kato survived the battle.

== Aftermath ==
Wŏn Kyun was left behind to mop up Japanese soldiers marooned on a small isle, but fled after receiving a false report of a large Japanese fleet approaching. The Japanese managed to drift to shore using rafts made from the wreckage of their ships.

On 23 August, Hideyoshi Toyotomi ordered naval commander Todo Takatora to reinforce operations in Korea and halted naval operations at Busan.

== International recognition ==
George Alexander Ballard (1862–1948), a vice admiral of British Royal Navy, complimented Admiral Yi's winning streaks by the Battle of Hansando highly:

"This was the great Korean admiral's crowning exploit. In the short space of six weeks [actually about 9 weeks, May 7, 1592 – July 7, 1592] he had achieved a series of successes unsurpassed in the whole annals of maritime war, destroying the enemy's battle fleets, cutting his [Hideyoshi's] lines of communication, sweeping up his convoys, imperilling the situation of his victorious armies in the field, and bringing his ambitious schemes to utter ruin. Not even Nelson, Blake, or Jean Bart could have done more than this scarcely known representative of a small and cruelly oppressed nation; and it is to be regretted that his memory lingers nowhere outside his native land, for no impartial judge could deny him the right to be accounted among the born leaders of men."

Historians Hulbert also admired the naval battle, evaluating it as follows.

"This is the Battle of Salamis in Joseon. This naval battle is the death sentence for Toyotomi's invasion of Joseon."

== In popular culture ==
The battle is depicted in the 2022 film Hansan: Rising Dragon directed by Kim Han-min. The Battle of Hansando is also portrayed in episode 74 of the TV drama series Immortal Admiral Yi Sun-sin.

== See also ==
- The Four Campaigns of Admiral Yi during the Imjin Year (1592)
- Siege of Jinju (1592)
- Battle of Haengju
- Battle of Myeongnyang

== Bibliography ==
- Alagappa, Muthiah (2003), Asian Security Order: Instrumental and Normative Features, Stanford University Press, ISBN 0-8047-4629-X
- Arano, Yasunori (2005), The Formation of a Japanocentric World Order, International Journal of Asian Studies
- Brown, Delmer M. (May 1948), "The Impact of Firearms on Japanese Warfare, 1543–1598", The Far Eastern Quarterly, 7 (3), Association for Asian Studies: 236–53, doi:10.2307/2048846, JSTOR 2048846, S2CID 162924328
- Eikenberry, Karl W. (1988), "The Imjin War", Military Review, 68 (2): 74–82
- Ha, Tae-hung; Sohn, Pow-key (1977), 'Nanjung Ilgi: War Diary of Admiral Yi Sun-sin, Yonsei University Press, ISBN 89-7141-018-3
- Haboush, JaHyun Kim (2016), The Great East Asian War and the Birth of the Korean Nation
- Hawley, Samuel (2005), The Imjin War, The Royal Asiatic Society, Korea Branch/UC Berkeley Press, ISBN 89-954424-2-5
- Jang, Pyun-soon (1998), Noon-eu-ro Bo-nen Han-gook-yauk-sa 5: Gor-yeo Si-dae (눈으로 보는 한국역사 5: 고려시대), Park Doo-ui, Bae Keum-ram, Yi Sang-mi, Kim Ho-hyun, Kim Pyung-sook, et al., Joog-ang Gyo-yook-yaun-goo-won. 1998-10-30. Seoul, Korea.
- Kim, Ki-chung (Fall 1999), "Resistance, Abduction, and Survival: The Documentary Literature of the Imjin War (1592–8)", Korean Culture, 20 (3): 20–29
- Kim, Yung-sik (1998), "Problems and Possibilities in the Study of the History of Korean Science", Osiris, 2nd Series, 13: 48–79, doi:10.1086/649280, JSTOR 301878, S2CID 143724260
- 桑田忠親 [Kuwata, Tadachika], ed., 舊參謀本部編纂, [Kyu Sanbo Honbu], 朝鮮の役 [Chousen no Eki] (日本の戰史 [Nihon no Senshi] Vol. 5), 1965.
- Neves, Jaime Ramalhete (1994), "The Portuguese in the Im-Jim War?", Review of Culture, 18: 20–24
- Niderost, Eric (June 2001), "Turtleboat Destiny: The Imjin War and Yi Sun Shin", Military Heritage, 2 (6): 50–59, 89
- Niderost, Eric (January 2002), "The Miracle at Myongnyang, 1597", Osprey Military Journal, 4 (1): 44–50
- Park, Yune-hee (1973), Admiral Yi Sun-shin and His Turtleboat Armada: A Comprehensive Account of the Resistance of Korea to the 16th Century Japanese Invasion, Shinsaeng Press
- Rockstein, Edward D. (1993), Strategic And Operational Aspects of Japan's Invasions of Korea 1592–1598 1993-6-18, Naval War College
- Sadler, A. L. (June 1937), "The Naval Campaign in the Korean War of Hideyoshi (1592–1598)", Transactions of the Asiatic Society of Japan, Second Series, 14: 179–208
- Sansom, George (1961), A History of Japan 1334–1615, Stanford University Press, ISBN 0-8047-0525-9
- Sohn, Pow-key (April–June 1959), "Early Korean Painting", Journal of the American Oriental Society, 79 (2): 96–103, doi:10.2307/595851, JSTOR 595851
- Stramigioli, Giuliana (December 1954), "Hideyoshi's Expansionist Policy on the Asiatic Mainland", Transactions of the Asiatic Society of Japan, Third Series, 3: 74–116
- Strauss, Barry (Summer 2005), "Korea's Legendary Admiral", MHQ: The Quarterly Journal of Military History, 17 (4): 52–61
- Swope, Kenneth M. (2006), "Beyond Turtleboats: Siege Accounts from Hideyoshi's Second Invasion of Korea, 1597–1598", Sungkyun Journal of East Asian Studies, 6 (2), Academy of East Asian Studies: 177–206
- Swope, Kenneth M. (2005), "Crouching Tigers, Secret Weapons: Military Technology Employed During the Sino-Japanese-Korean War, 1592–1598", The Journal of Military History, 69: 11–42, doi:10.1353/jmh.2005.0059, S2CID 159829515
- Swope, Kenneth M. (December 2002), "Deceit, Disguise, and Dependence: China, Japan, and the Future of the Tributary System, 1592–1596", The International History Review, 24 (4): 757–1008, doi:10.1080/07075332.2002.9640980, S2CID 154827808
- Swope, Kenneth M. (2009), A Dragon's Head and a Serpent's Tail: Ming China and the First Great East Asian War, 1592–1598, University of Oklahoma Press
- Turnbull, Stephen (2002), Samurai Invasion: Japan's Korean War 1592–98, Cassell & Co, ISBN 0-304-35948-3
- Turnbull, Stephen (2008), The Samurai Invasion of Korea 1592–98, Osprey Publishing Ltd
- Turnbull, Stephen (1998), The Samurai Sourcebook, Cassell & Co, ISBN 1-85409-523-4
- Villiers, John (1980), SILK and Silver: Macau, Manila and Trade in the China Seas in the Sixteenth Century (PDF) (A lecture delivered to the Hong Kong Branch of the Royal Asiatic Society at the Hong Kong Club. 10 June 1980), The HKUL Digital Initiatives
- Yi, Min-woong (2004), Imjin Wae-ran Haejeonsa: The Naval Battles of the Imjin War [임진왜란 해전사], Chongoram Media [청어람미디어], ISBN 89-89722-49-7
