= Yi Ŏkki =

Korean naval commander (1561–1597)

- Hangul: 이억기
- Hanja: 李億祺
- RR: I Eokgi
- MR: I Ŏkki

Art name
- Hangul: 경수
- Hanja: 景受
- RR: Gyeongsu
- MR: Kyŏngsu

Posthumous name
- Hangul: 의민
- Hanja: 毅愍
- RR: Uimin
- MR: Ŭimin

Yi Ŏkki (Korean: 이억기; Hanja: 李億祺; 3 September 1561 – 27 August 1597) was the commander of the Korean Eastern Jeolla Fleet and later came to be the commander of the Western Jeolla Fleet. At age 32, despite being 15 years younger than Supreme Naval Commander Yi Sun-sin, Yi Ŏkki became his most trusted commander and companion during the Imjin War. Yi Ŏkki was eventually killed in the devastating Battle of Chilcheollyang Strait while assisting Wŏn Kyun, the Naval Commander of the entire Korean navy at that time while Yi Sun-sin was imprisoned as a result of a plot.

== Early life ==
Yi Ŏkki was born in Hansong, which is nowadays Seoul. He was a great warrior from his youth. Yi fought against the Jurchens from the North where he made a great contribution.

== Early campaigns ==
Yi led a flotilla of 40 ships alongside Yi Sun Sin and Wŏn Kyun during the Battle of Tanghangpo, Battle of Hansan-do, Battle of Angolpo, the First Battle of Busan Harbor (1592), and the Battle of Unchong. He received a promotion and special recognition for having a major role in the destruction of a Japanese flotilla during the Battle of Hansan-do.

== Battle of Chilcheollyang Strait and death ==
The order to attack the Japanese near Busan originated from King Seonjo himself. The attack on an entrenched Japanese force was viewed by the Korean navy and even some within the government as a suicide mission—in fact, Yi Sun Sin was removed largely for defying this attack order. Factionalism in Seonjo's court pushed Yi Sun Sin's replacement, an equally unenthusiastic Wŏn Kyun, to go forward with the order. On August 20, 1597, an inept Wŏn Kyun led the 200 ship flotilla on an extended row and into a Japanese ambush of 1,000 ships laying off the coast of Cholyong-do. It was now nighttime and Wŏn Kyun and Yi Ŏkki, both unaccustomed to fighting at night, were forced to retreat their exhausted crews multiple times as the Japanese tried to close their trap shut. The commanders fled to the Chilcheollyang Strait where they were later crushed by the advancing Japanese navy. As the Japanese destroyed the Korean fleet, Wŏn Kyun fled, but Yi Ŏkki refused to leave, fighting on until he finally jumped into the waters to his death.

== Legacy ==
The Republic of Korea Navy's Chang Bogo-class attack submarine ROKS Yi Eokgi (SS-071) is named in his honor.

== Popular culture ==
- Portrayed by Choi Dong-joon in the 2004–2005 KBS1 TV series Immortal Admiral Yi Sun-sin.
- Portrayed by Gong Myung in the 2022 film Hansan: Rising Dragon.

== See also ==
- Nanjung ilgi
