= Nanjung ilgi =

16th-century diary of Yi Sun-sin

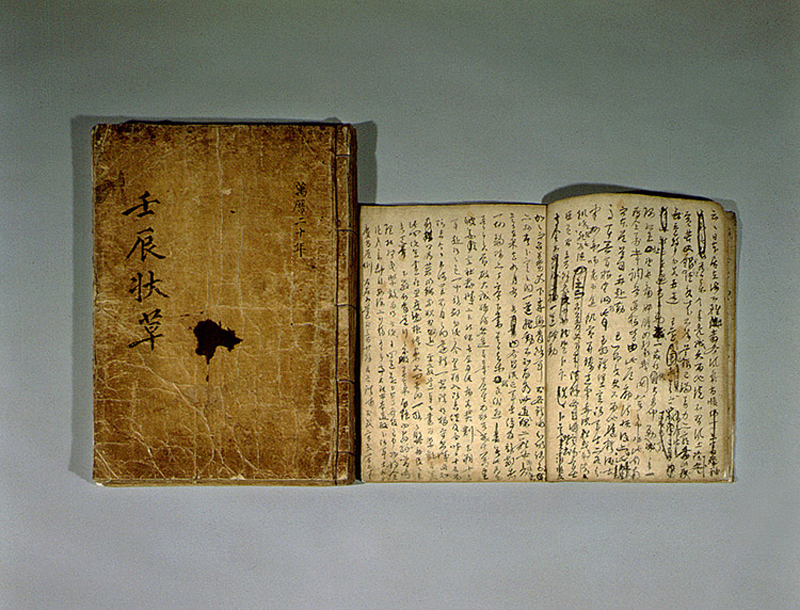
- Nanjung ilgi during Japanese invasions of Korea (1592–98) and Album of Calligraphy by Yi Sun-sin

Korean name
- Hangul: 난중일기
- Hanja: 亂中日記
- RR: Nanjung ilgi
- MR: Nanjung ilgi

Nanjung ilgi (Korean: 난중일기; Hanja: 亂中日記) or the War Diary of Yi Sun-sin is the personal diary of Admiral Yi Sun-sin, a Korean admiral famed for his victories against the Japanese navy during the Imjin war during the Joseon period. It was written between January 1, 1592, and November 17, 1598, a first person narrative of the admiral's perspective on the Japanese invasions of Korea in the late 16th century.

It is the 76th national treasure of Korea and listed in UNESCO's Memory of the World registry.

== Contents ==
The original Nanjung ilgi consists of 205 folio pages divided into 7 volumes. Entries detail the admiral's daily life in a military camp, his strategies, his naval campaigns, the names and dispositions of various military officers and civil officials with whom Admiral Yi interacted, geographic and atmospheric details, and his personal observations and commentary on the events and circumstances of his military command. These entries are not continuous: there are breaks in the narrative throughout the diary, representative of periods of time in which Admiral Yi was unable to maintain daily entries. There is also some overlap between Volumes 5 and 6, where Admiral Yi apparently later revised earlier entries.

=== Volume 1 ===
Volume 1 consists of 27 folio pages, covering the entries from the 1st of 5th moon 1592 to the 22nd of 3rd moon 1593.

=== Volume 2 ===
Volume 2 consists of 30 folio pages, covering the entries from the 1st day of 5th moon 1593 to the 15th day of 9th moon 1593.

=== Volume 3 ===
Volume 2 consists of 50 folio pages, covering the entries from the 1st day of 1st moon 1594 to the 28th day of 11th moon 1594.

=== Volume 4 ===
Volume 4 consists of 41 folio pages, covering the entries from the 1st day of 1st moon 1596 to the 11th day of 10th moon 1596.

=== Volume 5 ===
Volume 5 consists of 27 folio pages, covering the entries from the 1st day of 4th moon 1597 to the 8th day of 10th moon 1597.

=== Volume 6 ===
Volume 6 consists of 20 folio pages, covering the entries from the 4th day of 8th moon 1597 to the 4th day of 1st moon 1598.

=== Volume 7 ===
Volume 7 consists of 8 folio pages, covering the entries from the 15th day of 9th moon 1598 to the 7th day of 10th moon 1598.
