= List of naval battles during the Imjin War =

During the Imjin War, there were a number of naval battles.

Date	Battles	location	Korean Commanders	Japanese Commanders	Result
1592 June 16 (May 7)	Battle of Okpo	Geoje okpo	Yi Sun-sin; Wŏn Kyun	Todo Takatora	Decisive Korean victory.
1592 June 16 (May 7)	Battle of Happo	Masan Sanho-dong	Yi Sun-sin; Wŏn Kyun		Korean victory.
1592 June 17 (May 8)	Battle of Jeokjinpo	Goseong Georyu-myeon, Tongyeong Gwangdo-myeon	Yi Sun-sin; Wŏn Kyun		Korean victory.
1592 (May 29)	Battle of Sacheon	Sacheon Yonghyeon-myeon	Yi Sun-sin; Wŏn Kyun	Kurushima Michiyuki	Decisive Korean victory. Turtle Ship first appearance.
1592 (June 2)	Battle of Dangpo	Tongyeong Sanyang-eup	Yi Sun-sin	Kamei Korenori	Decisive Korean victory.
1592 (June 5)	First Danghangpo Battle	Goseong hoehwa-myeon Danghangpo-ri	Yi Sun-sin; Yi Ŏkki		Decisive Korean victory.
1592 (June 6)	Battle of Yulpo	Geoje Jangmok-myeon	Yi Sun-sin		Korean victory.
1592 August 14 (July 8)	Battle of Hansan Island	Tongyeong Hansan-myeon	Yi Sun-sin; Yi Ŏkki; Wŏn Kyun	Wakizaka Yasuharu	Decisive Korean victory.
1592 August 16 (July 10)	Battle of Angolpo	Jinhae Angol-dong	Yi Sun-sin; Yi Ŏkki; Wŏn Kyun	Kuki Yoshiaki	Decisive Korean victory.
1592 (August 29)	Battle of Jangnimpo	Busan Saha-gu Jangrim-dong	Yi Sun-sin; Yi Ŏkki; Wŏn Kyun		Korean victory.
1592 October 5 (September 1)	Battle of Hwajungumi	Busan Saha-gu Molundae	Yi Sun-sin		Korean victory.
1592 October 5 (September 1)	Battle of Dadaepo	Busan Saha-gu Dadae-dong	Yi Sun-sin		Korean victory.
1592 October 5 (September 1)	Battle of Seopeongpo	Busan Saha-gu Gupyeong-dong Gamcheon	Yi Sun-sin		Korean victory.
1592 October 5 (September 1)	Battle of Jeolyeong Island	Busan Yeongdo-gu	Yi Sun-sin		Korean victory.
1592 October 5 (September 1)	Battle of Choryangmok	Busan Dong-gu Choryang-dong	Yi Sun-sin		Korean victory.
1592 October 5 (September 1)	Battle of Busan	Busan Dong-gu Jwacheon-dong	Yi Sun-sin; Yi Ŏkki; Wŏn Kyun; Chŏng Un		Decisive Korean victory.
1593 March 6 (February 10)	Battle of Ungpo	Jinhae Ungcheon-dong	Yi Sun-sin; Yi Ŏkki; Wŏn Kyun		Korean victory.
1594 (March 4)	Second Danghangpo Battle	Goseong hoehwa-myeon Danghangpo-ri	Yi Sun-sin; Yi Ŏkki; Wŏn Kyun; Eo Yeong-dam		Korean victory.
1594 (October 4)	Battle of Jangmunpo	Geoje Jangmok-myeon Jangmok-ri	Yi Sun-sin		Korean victory.
1597 August 28 (July 16)	Battle of Chilcheollyang	Geoje Chilcheollyang	Wŏn Kyun; Yi Ŏkki; Ch'oe Ho; Pae Sŏl	Todo Takatora; Wakizaka Yasuharu; Konishi Yukinaga	Decisive Japanese victory.
1597 (August 27)	Battle of Eoranpo	Haenam Songji-myeon Eoranpo	Yi Sun-sin		Korean victory.
1597년 October 16 (September 7)	Battle of Byeokpajin	Jindo Gogun-myeon Byeokpajin	Yi Sun-sin		Korean victory.
1597년 October 25 (September 16)	Battle of Myeongnyang	Haenam Munnae-myeon, Jindo nokjin-ri	Yi Sun-sin; Kim Ŏkch'u	Todo Takatora; Kurushima Michifusa; Katō Yoshiaki; Wakizaka Yasuharu	Decisive Korean victory.
1598 (July 19)	Battle of Jeolyi Island	Goheung Geumsan-myeon Geogeum Island	Yi Sun-sin		Korean victory.
1598 October 19 - November 6	Battle of Jang Island	Suncheon Jangdo	Yi Sun-sin; Chen Lin	Konishi Yukinaga	Korean navy rescued the Chinese navy from the Japanese blockade. However, whole of operation was failed.
1598 December 16 (November 19)	Battle of Noryang	Namhae Seolcheon-myeon Noryang-ri	Yi Sun-sin; Chen Lin	Konishi Yukinaga; Shimazu Yoshihiro; Wakizaka Yasuharu; So Yoshitoshi	Decisive Korean and Chinese victory. Death of Admiral Yi.

== See also ==
- Administrative divisions of South Korea
- History of Korea
- List of naval battles
- Imjin War
- Yi Sun-sin
- List of battles during the Imjin War
