= Korean Navy =

Korean Navy may refer to:

Currently

- Korean People's Navy, the navy of North Korea
- Republic of Korea Navy, the navy of South Korea

Historically

- Joseon Navy (1392–1907), under the Joseon Dynasty (1392–1910)
