= Battle of Jeokjinpo =

1592 naval battle between Korea and Japan

- Part of the Imjin War
Date	8 May 1592
Location	Jeokjinpo harbor, Tongyeong
Result	Korean victory

Belligerents
Fleet of Toyotomi Hideyoshi	Joseon Navy

Commanders and leaders
Unknown	Yi Sun-sin; Wŏn Kyun

Strength
13 ships	Yi Sun-sin: 24 panoksons; 15 hyeupsons; 46 fishing boats; Wŏn Kyun: 4 panoksons; 2 small ships

Casualties and losses
11 ships	None

The Battle of Jeokjinpo was fought on 8 May 1592. After the Battle of Happo, further reports of an additional 13 Japanese ships prevented Yi Sun-sin and his fleet from resting long on the morning of 8 May. Admiral Yi once again ordered his fleet to pursue the Japanese in the direction of Jinhae. The Korean forces caught up with the Japanese ships at Jeokjinpo. The Koreans easily sank 11 Japanese warships.

== Bibliography ==
- Hawley, Samuel (2014), The Imjin War: Japan's Sixteenth-Century Invasion of Korea and Attempt to Conquer China, Conquistador Press, ISBN 978-0-9920786-2-1
