= Battle of Happo =

- Part of Imjin War
Date	7 May 1592
Location	Happo harbor, Masan
Result	Korean victory

Belligerents
Fleet of Toyotomi Hideyoshi	Joseon Navy

Commanders and leaders
Unknown	Yi Sun-sin; Wŏn Kyun

Strength
5 ships	Yi Sun-sin: 24 panoksons; 15 hyeupsons; 46 fishing boats; Wŏn Kyun: 4 panoksons; 2 small ships

Casualties and losses
5 ships	None

The Battle of Happo was a naval engagement on May 7, 1592, one of the three Joseon naval campaigns of 1592 conducted by Korean admiral Yi Sun-sin during Japanese invasions of Korea (1592-1598) against the Japanese forces of Toyotomi Hideyoshi. These campaigns made Yi a legendary figure in Korean history. The campaigns of Yi were vital in halting the Japanese invasion.

While intending to spend the night in the open sea following the initial Battle of Okpo, Admiral Yi Sun-sin was forced to change his plans due to a report of five large Japanese ships having been sighted heading in the direction of Happo around 5 p.m. He ordered his forces to pursue the Japanese ships, which they caught and destroyed in a small skirmish near Happo. Admiral Yi’s forces now had two victories under their belt.

== Bibliography ==
- Hawley, Samuel (2014), The Imjin War: Japan's Sixteenth-Century Invasion of Korea and Attempt to Conquer China, Conquistador Press, ISBN 978-0-9920786-2-1
