= Joseon Navy =

Navy of the Korean Joseon dynasty

- Royal coat of arms of Joseon
- Disbanded: 1895
- Country: Korea
- Allegiance: King of Joseon
- Type: Navy
- Role: Maritime patrol Naval warfare
- Size: 737 ships; 48,800 personnel

Insignia
- Ensign

The Joseon Navy (Korean: 조선 수군; Hanja: 朝鮮水軍) was the navy of the Korean dynasty of Joseon. While originally commissioned to protect merchant vessels and coastal towns from Japanese pirate raids, the Joseon navy is best known for defeating the Japanese naval forces during the Imjin War and is often credited with halting the Japanese invasion campaign and saving the dynasty from conquest.

== History ==
Throughout Korea's naval history, rough waters around Korea's coast usually change tides and currents. Korean shipbuilding tradition centered on creating simple but structurally sound vessels that emphasized strength and power rather than speed. The Joseon Navy utilized warships from the Goryeo Dynasty to defend against wokou. In the 15th century, under the decree of King Sejong, more powerful cannons were developed and tested. The cannons on battleships proved to be a great success during actions against Japanese pirate ships.

In 1419, King Sejong sent Yi Chongmu to raid the Japanese on Tsushima Island in the Oei Invasion as a response to Japanese Wokou raids on Korean coastal cities. Yi took 227 Korean ships and approximately 17,000 soldiers, landed, attacked, and plundered Japanese pirate settlements on Tsushima Island. The So clan, the ruling family of Tsushima, requested negotiations. In the diplomatic exchanges that followed, Korea permitted the So clan to continue trade with Korean coastal harbors under the condition that they suppress the activities of Japanese pirates.

During the Joseon dynasty, the navy and maritime operations fell into disuse, while fishing vessels continued to operate and prosper. The entire military was ignored and weakened because of the relative peace during the Joseon dynasty. Also, with the policy of Korean kings that emphasized agriculture and Confucian ideals, the Korean navy, along with the rest of the Korean military, weakened steadily. However, Korea eventually developed strong wooden ships called panokseons that made up the backbone of the Joseon navy. Panokseons and the Korean navy were most widely used during the Japanese invasions of Korea (1592-1598), particularly under the leadership of Admiral Yi Sun-sin. Admiral Yi also developed the turtle ship, based upon an older design. The Kobukson, or Turtle Ship, was the world's first armor-plated warship.

By the end of the 19th century, the Joseon Navy had no significant naval force other than coast defense fortresses. Although according to the Geunsejoseonjeonggam, both the government and private entities owned a total of 143 steamships. In March 1893, the Korean Imperial Naval Academy (통제영학당,統制營學堂) was established. The academy produced approximately 160 officers before its closure during and after the First Sino-Japanese War.

== Organization ==
In the early Joseon period, each port had a naval commander (水軍都節制使), a deputy naval commander (水軍都僉節制使), and a naval administrator (水軍處置使). During King Sejong's reign, the naval commander was renamed to naval pacification administrator (水軍都安撫處置使) and was assisted by high-ranking officers such as Domanho (都萬戶) and Manho (萬戶). According to the 『Gyeongguk Daejeon』, under the garrison system, naval commanders were stationed in major garrisons, deputy naval commanders in large garrisons, and Manho in various garrisons.

The command system of the naval forces was that one or two provincial commanders from each province commanded a provincial naval base, and each coastal county and city had a naval commander. The majority of the Joseon Navy was stationed in Gyeongsang, Jeolla, and Chungcheong provinces. After several reorganizations concerning the naval command of the military magistrates during the reign of King Sejong, he established the naval commander system, under which the naval commanders were placed.

During the reign of King Sejong, the naval forces were systematically organized in terms of the number of troops, military ships, and the establishment of forts at various ports. The naval forces and the regular army were the main conscripted forces among the civilian population. During the reign of King Seongjong in 1475, out of a total of 148,849 soldiers, the naval forces numbered 48,800, and the regular army numbered 72,109. The naval forces were supplemented not only by coastal residents but also by people from inland regions. Among the naval forces, positions such as Jinmu (鎭撫), Jiin (知印), Yeongsa (令史), Sagwan (射官), and Yeongseondumok (領船頭目) were given preferential treatment over lower-ranking soldiers.

According to the 『Gyeongguk Daejeon』, military ships were classified and distributed into large, medium, and small fierce ships (大中小猛船) for each port in each province. The total number of military ships nationwide was 737, including 81 large fierce ships, 195 medium fierce ships, and 461 small fierce ships. The crew size for each type of ship was 80 for large fierce ships, 60 for medium fierce ships, and 30 for small fierce ships. Excluding non-military ships, the total crew size multiplied by the number of ships equaled 24,400, which matched half of the total number of naval forces (48,800), aligning with the two-shift rotation system.

In the naval organization of the late Joseon period, shield ships were typically deployed in one of two formations:

1. shield ship, 1 armed ship (byeongseon), and 2 patrol ships (sahuseon), or
2. warship (jeonseon), 1 shield ship, 1 armed ship, and 2–3 patrol ships.

The first arrangement was typical of naval posts in Hwanghae and Chungcheong Provinces, while the second was used in Jeolla Province, where maritime defense was of greater importance.

=== Ranks ===
The navy’s command structure in the early Joseon period included posts such as the Naval Commander-in-Chief (Sugŭn Dojeoljesa, 水軍都節制使), Deputy Commander (Sugŭn Doch‘ŏmjeoljesa, 水軍都僉節制使), and Naval Commissioner (Sugŭn Ch‘ŏch’isa, 水軍處置使). In Sejong’s reign, the Dojeoljesa was renamed the Doanmuch‘ŏch’isa (水軍都安撫處置使), with subordinate officials including the Domanho (都萬戶) and Manho (萬戶). According to the Kyŏngguk Taejŏn (經國大典), under the local fortress system (Jingwanje, 鎭管制), the main fort was commanded by a Naval Jeoldosa (水軍節度使), major forts by a Naval Deputy Commander (Sugŭn Ch‘ŏmjeoljesa), and smaller forts by Manho. A ship's crew comprises rowers, gunners, sailors, low-ranking officers, lieutenants, and a captain.

Joseon Naval Ranks
| Korean | English | Role |
|---|---|---|
| 삼도수군통제사 | Commander of the Three Provinces | The highest naval military position in the Joseon dynasty, overseeing the naval forces of Gyeongsang, Jeolla, and Chungcheong provinces. This was a senior second-rank external military post. Also known as Samdotongjesa, Samdosugun Tongjesa, or Tonggon. The position was established in 1593 (the 26th year of King Seonjo's reign) during the Imjin War to ensure a smooth command structure among the naval commanders of each province. The first person to hold this position was Admiral Yi Sun-sin, who concurrently served as Jeolla Jwasusa. From the tenure of the 4th Tongjesa, Yi Si-eon, the Gyeongsang Ususa often concurrently held this position. The term was typically two years, though reappointments were possible. |
| 수군절도사 | Naval Commander of the Province | A senior third-rank external military post in the Joseon dynasty responsible for overseeing the naval forces of each province. Also known as Susa, the position was typically held for two years. Initially called Sugundoanmucheochisa when established during King Sejo’s reign in 1466, it was renamed when the administrative system was reorganized. The standard number of positions was three each for Gyeongsang and Jeolla provinces, two each for Gyeonggi, Chungcheong, and Pyeongan provinces, and one each for Hwanghae and Gangwon provinces. However, considering the geographical conditions, the actual assignments were slightly different. After the Imjin War, some changes occurred. Originally, Susas commanded warships and subordinate officers like Cheomjeoldosa (junior third rank), Uhu (senior fourth rank), and Dongcheomjeoldosa (junior fourth rank). |
| 첨절제사 | Commander of the County | A junior third-rank military post in the Joseon dynasty responsible for commanding naval forces at key positions. Renamed from Domangho in 1466, Cheomjeoldosa were generally junior third rank, but at Dadaepo in Gyeongsang and Manpojin in Pyeongan, they were appointed as senior third rank. They oversaw key coastal areas and certain inland forts. According to the "Daejeon Hoetong," the number of Cheomjeoldosa varied across provinces, with Pyeongan having the most (26) and Hwanghae and Hamgyeong having the least (1 each). |
| 수군 만호 | Naval Commander | Fourth highest-ranking officer assigned to various naval camps in each province to be given the task of defending against invasion. It was a Goryeo officer rank used in the early days of the Joseon Dynasty. The Sungun Manhobu was an office that administered the Manho. Domanho is the 2nd rank, Manho is the 3rd rank, and Bumanho is the 4th rank. A Manho's term of office was 900 days and was usually appointed based on his martial arts examination. |
| 선장 | Captain | Seonjangs commanded one or more ships and were responsible for naval operations. In the Joseon dynasty, naval officers typically also served as Seonjangs. Separate Seonjangs were appointed for additional ships in an area. Warships like panokseon, geobukseon, and bangpaeseon had Seonjangs, but smaller ships did not. |
| 선직 | Quartermaster | Seonjik, meaning 'warehouse keeper,' referred to those responsible for managing ships in the navy. They wore naval uniforms and safeguarded ships and their contents when docked. Initially, each warship had two Seonjiks, but later, only one was assigned. |
| 포도장 | Master-at-arms | Podojang (also known as Podogwan or Podowon) managed all affairs on a ship, ensuring that all soldiers followed their directives. Each warship in the Jeolla Right Naval Command had one Podojang, while those in the Jeolla Left Naval Command had two. |
| 기패관 | Lieutenant | Gipaegwan handled various administrative tasks, including managing command tokens, documents, and identification papers. According to "Mangi Yoram," Gipaegwans in different military units were selected from common soldiers and could hold ranks up to the sixth grade. This was similar in the navy, where Gipaegwans were likely lower-ranking officers. Historical documents mention the presence of Gipaegwan during the Imjin War. The Jeolla Right Naval Command had 25 Gipaegwans, and each panokseon in the Gyeongsang Left Naval Command had two Gipaegwans. |
| 훈도 | Sergeant | Hundo were soldiers responsible for teaching and correcting others. They were likely the lowest-ranking military personnel or clerks in each military camp, not of noble status but probably of commoner standing. "Pungcheon Yuhyang" describes them as literate, skilled in calculations, and trained in archery and staff fighting. They handled various administrative tasks on warships and may have also had responsibilities related to ship operation and combat. |
| 사부 (사군, 사수) | Sailor (seaman) | Soldiers who use bows or guns. In "Pungcheon Yuhyang," it is stated, "Sabu are exclusively responsible for shooting arrows and also carry short swords." The term 'Sabu' frequently appears in various reports by Admiral Yi Sun-sin. In the "Mangi Yoram," the term 'Sabu' is used for the naval bases of Gyeongsang Left and Right, while 'Sasu' is used for the naval bases of Jeolla Left and Right. This indicates that 'Sasu' and 'Sabu' refer to the same role and duties. In the case of the warships (panokseon) operated during the late Joseon period, the standard number of Sabu on board was 18, although the "Hojwasuyeongji" records instances where only 15 Sabu were assigned. |
| 화포장 | Gunnery Master | Hwapojang (also known as Bangpojang or Hwaposu) were responsible for loading and firing cannons. "Sugunbyontongjeolmok" states that each warship had 10 to 14 Hwapojangs. "Yi Sun-sin Janggae" mentions Bangpojang, indicating they had similar duties to Hwapojang. These soldiers possessed technical skills for handling gunpowder weapons. |
| 포수 | Gunner | Posu (also known as Pogun or Bangpo) were soldiers who directly fired gunpowder weapons. "Yi Sun-sin Janggae" notes that Posu were called 'Bangpo' during the Imjin War. While Hwapojang provided technical support or command, Posu were responsible for the actual firing of weapons. "Pungcheon Yuhyang" describes that senior Posu handled the loading and firing of installed firearms and carried long spears for close combat. |
| 능노군 | Oarsman | Neungnogun were rowers, also known as Sugun, Nogun, or Gyeokgun. According to "Sugunbyontongjeolmok," each panokseon had 100 rowers. Panokseons had 16 oars, with four rowers per oar, forming a group of five with one leader. This totaled 80 rowers, with the remaining 20 likely serving as reserves. |

=== Duties ===
The rotation system for the naval forces was '2 rotations per month' (二番一朔相遞), with six months of service per year, whereas the regular army had '8 rotations per two months' (八番二朔相遞), with three months of service per year. Thus, the naval forces bore a heavier burden than the regular army. Initially, naval service could be alternated between the head of a household and a subordinate. Still, regulations were tightened so that only the head of a household could serve, and a wooden plaque (漆圓木牌) was used to prevent substitutes.

When reporting for duty, naval forces carried their own provisions and served on ships, being mobilized for various tasks such as garrison farming, fishing, salt production, harvesting marine products, repairing military ships, transporting goods, and building fortifications. Additionally, they were responsible for labor service, tribute goods, and special contributions. Much of the tribute from seaside regions was seafood. Salt was popular across the nation. They produce salt and capture seafood during their military service. Therefore, the role of the navy was twice as heavy as the institutional burden compared to the army.

=== Conditions ===
Originally, the navy was supposed to serve at sea, but due to the difficulties of ship maintenance and harsh training, fortresses began to be established inland from Seongjong’s reign. This shifted the navy from maritime to land-based duties, blurring distinctions between the navy and the army. By King Jungjong’s time, some argued for the “Theory of Land Defense against the Japanese” (防倭陸戰論), which claimed that since the Japanese excelled in naval combat and Koreans in cavalry, Joseon should focus on strengthening the army.

As this theory spread, the navy weakened, allowing Japanese raiders greater freedom. After the Sampho Waeran (三浦倭亂, 1510), the cooperative defense system initially applied only to Gyeongsang Province’s navy was expanded to Jeolla Province, and eventually both land and sea forces shifted to the “Victory-Ensuring Strategy” (制勝方略). Under this system, known as “segmented force deployment” (分軍法), fortress commanders would mobilize their troops to fight in designated areas rather than remaining fixed in their home bases.

During the mid-Joseon period, the navy grappled with deteriorating working conditions and struggled to defend itself in confrontations. The warships of that era were highly susceptible to the whims of wind and waves. Commanders, marines, and sailors often found themselves at the mercy of power-based irregularities and mistreatment. They were also vulnerable to various diseases and contagions, leading some to desert their posts.

From King Seongjong's time, the practice of hiring substitutes and paying fees to avoid military service became common, transforming the heavy burden of naval service into a financial burden for hiring substitutes, such as the practice of collecting cloth instead of military service (방군수포, 放軍收布). Wealthy sailors and officers hired substitutes to fulfill their military duties. At the same time, officers such as Assistant Commanders (첨사, 僉使) and Commanders (만호) took clothes from sailors in exchange for exempting them from service. Additionally, people of unclear status (양천불명자, 良賤不明者) and criminals were conscripted into the navy, causing the naval service to become a low-status duty. Such circumstances have continued for over 100 years.

The government, recognizing the heavy burden of naval service, granted naval personnel honorary titles (수직, 授職), tax exemptions, exempted them from labor duties (복호, 復戶), and allowed them to live with their families. However, as naval service became less desirable, only the lower classes among civilians were conscripted into the navy. The general population was reluctant to join the navy. Consequently, during King Seongjong's reign, naval service became hereditary (세전, 世傳) to maintain a consistent number of maritime personnel. However, this accelerated the degradation of the marine service, which eventually became regarded as one of the seven low-status occupations (칠반천역, 七般賤役) in the later period.

==== Reforms ====
Admiral Yi Sun-sin prepared for the Japanese invasion of Korea in 1592. He and his subordinate Jeong Woon reformed the navy by reducing the hours of fatigue duty or banning nighttime fatigue duty. When Admiral Yi Sun-sin inspected troops and pointed to defects, commanders explained their struggles that people were tired and there were not enough supplies and capacity and lacked military power. During the Imjin War (1592, the 25th year of King Seonjo's reign), the army suffered repeated defeats. Still, the naval forces under Admiral Yi Sun-sin of Jeolla Province won numerous victories, securing control of the sea and significantly impacting the war's outcome. Admiral Yi's success in naval battles was due not only to his knowledge of the sea and the use of turtle ships but also to the superiority of large cannons (such as Seungja Choeongtong) fired from the ships.

=== Offices ===
==== Border Defense Council of Joseon ====
The Border Defense Council of Joseon was a supreme administrative organ established by the central government after the Disturbance of the Three Ports. It allowed the higher military officers, the Jibyeonsa Jaesang (지변사재상; 知邊司宰相), to participate in the process of establishing security maneuvers to meticulously keep a keen eye on the issues of the border. Accordingly, the council applied naval security measures to Gyeongsang province and extended them to Jeolla and to the rest of the southern regions.

==== Tongjeongyeong ====
During the Imjin War (1592), while the army suffered repeated defeats, Admiral Yi Sunsin, commander of the Left Naval Station of Jeolla Province, won victory after victory, securing control of the seas and greatly altering the course of the war. His success was due not only to his knowledge of local waters and the deployment of turtle ships (Kobukson, 龜船), but also to the superior firepower of large cannons mounted on ships. In 1593, during the war, the Tongjeyŏng (統制營, Naval Headquarters) was established, placing the navies of Gyeongsang, Jeolla, and Chungcheong Provinces under the unified command of the Naval Commander-in-Chief (Tongjesa, 統制使), thereby strengthening coastal defense.

==== Tongeoyeong ====
In 1627, facing war with the Later Jin (Later Qing), another naval command, the T‘ongŏyŏng (統禦營), was set up in Ganghwa to oversee the navies of Gyeonggi and Hwanghae Provinces for the defense of the capital region. With the establishment of these commands during the Japanese and Manchu invasions, large-scale joint naval drills (Sujo, 水操) became common. These were divided into provincial drills (Dosujo, 道水操), led by provincial naval commanders, and joint drills (Hapjo, 合操), led by the Tongjesa or T‘ongŏsa. Spring drills (Chunjo, 春操) were usually joint, while autumn drills (Ch‘ujo, 秋操) were provincial.

== Defense systems ==
The provinces were defended by the Naval Army (gisangun → suguns, 船軍 / 水軍) – recruited mainly from coastal populations, serving in rotation, but burdened by harsh salt production duties (leading to degraded social status). Japanese pirate invasions intensified as the naval forces weakened due to this shift. After the Three Ports Incident (三浦倭亂), the joint defense system initially implemented only for the Gyeongsang naval forces was expanded to Jeolla Province, eventually leading to the adoption of the Jeeseungbangryak (制勝方略) defense strategy for both the navy and the army. The garrison system was a regional defense system based on provinces. At the same time, the Jeseungbangryak involved commanders leading their troops from the main garrison to designated defense areas for combat during emergencies.

In the provinces, the Sogo Army (속오군) emerged after the Imjin War. The old Jingwan (鎭管) system was restored, but new reforms introduced the Yeongjang system (營將制度), which separated military authority from the civil magistrates. The navy was reorganized under a unified naval command system, exemplified by Admiral Yi Sun-sin’s (李舜臣) role as Naval Commander-in-Chief of the Three Provinces (1593). Later, coastal and river defense was strengthened with regional naval commands (Tong’eosa, 統禦使), and in 1700 a Jinmuyoung (鎭撫營) was established on Ganghwa Island to oversee naval defense. Additional fortress garrisons (Bangyeoyoung, 防禦營) were established at strategic points across the country.

=== Jingwan system ===
The Jingwan system was a provincial defense system that dates back to the Goryeo Dynasty. From 1455 (King Sejo’s reign), large fortresses (jin, 鎭) were established inland, forming the Jingwan system in 1458. Each province was divided into main garrisons (jujin, 主鎭), large fortresses (geojin, 巨鎭), and sub-garrisons (jin, 鎭). Naval commanders (sugun jeoldosa) commanded naval forces. Still, it leaves some parts of the nations open to invasion, and if one falls, it will be catastrophic in any war. In 1457 A.D, King Sejo reshuffled the defense system to secure as many defensive fortresses as possible to enhance the defensive depth. It comprises a Jujin, the main fortress commanded by a Byeongsa, a provincial military commander who takes a regional defense and orders lower unit commanders. A Geojin, a medium-sized local administrative unit commanded by a Byeongmajeoljesa or Cheomjeoljesa (Geojin Military Commander) between the provincial capital and small local towns called Jejins, who are commanded by the chief local magistrates who often doubled as garrison commanders, or a Manho, a naval commander. Originally, the naval forces were supposed to work at sea, but because of the management of the ships and the arduous training, King Seongjong installed coastal fortresses. Using this strategic composition, a Jingwan fights and defend their provinces, and every province has several independent Jingwans. Under this system, the roles of local commanders were to be stationed at their post, know the local topography inside and out, draft the operation plan, train local sailors and marines, and defend their defensive quarter by mobilizing their fleets in the case of conflict. However, when there was a massive invasion, there were not enough soldiers to defend their provinces as it was also a dispersed-force defense system. It requires the concentrated use of forced local forces to defend their defense perimeters, and the Bupiljeoktajinjijobeob rule prevents provinces from coming to each other's aid. Local magistrates, being civil officials often lacked military expertise. They requested military commanders from the central government who did not know a familiar province's terrain. By 1464, all provincial troops were standardized as jeongbyeong (regular soldiers). These soldiers served locally but also rotated to the capital for guard duty. The estimated total provincial force under the Jingwan system was 500,000–600,000 men.

=== Jeseungbangryak system ===
Joseon navy mobilizes its troops and ships through the Jeseungbangryak system. It allowed the military commanders from the central government to control assembled troops from the main army to the local and provincial armies. However, an admiral appointed by the king's court arrived with a newly mobilized army. It was a highly inefficient arrangement since the nearby forces would remain stationary until the mobile border commander arrived on the scene and took control. Secondly, the appointed admiral often came from an outside region. The admiral was unlikely unfamiliar with the natural environment, the available technology, and staffing of the invaded region. Finally, as the government never maintained the main army, new and ill-trained recruits conscripted during war constituted a significant part of the army.

=== Sogo system ===
As naval manpower dwindled, King Sukjong implemented the Naval Consolidation Law (Naval Sogo Law (水軍束伍法)) to strengthen the navy. This system mixed commoners and outcast groups, replacing the earlier two-division rotation with a three-division system, thereby reducing the length of service per individual.

=== Garrison Command system ===
The Garrison Command system was a military organization system that divided the country into military districts, with each district under the command of a garrison commander. These commanders were responsible for maintaining the readiness of their troops, ensuring that they were trained and equipped to defend against any potential threats. The Garrison Command system also facilitated the rapid deployment of troops to any part of the country, allowing the navy to quickly respond to any invasion or attack.

== Ships ==
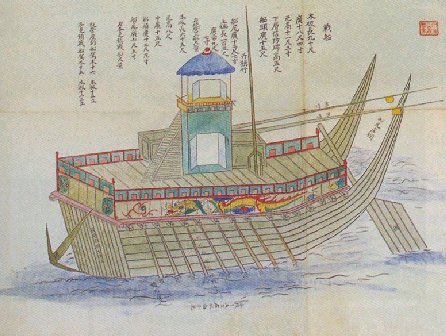
Panokseons were sturdy and powerful battleships superior to the Japanese vessels during the Imjin War.

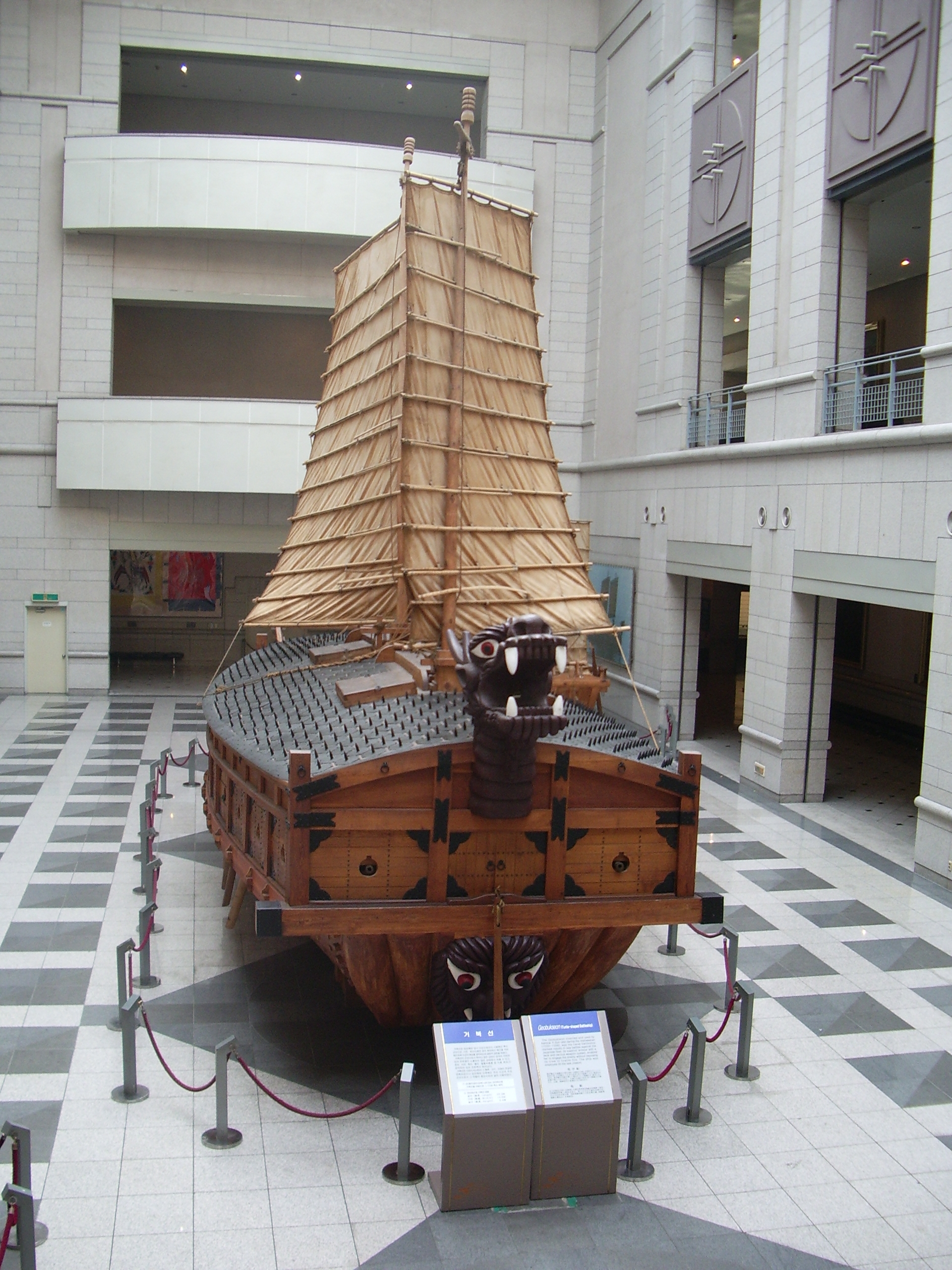
A modern replica of the turtle ship on display.

The most important naval equipment was the warship. Initially, warships for battle and transport ships for grain tribute were distinct. The Geography Section of the Annals of King Sejong (Sejong Sillok Jiriji) lists various warships, such as Daeseon (大船, great ships), Jungseon (中船, medium ships), Kwaeseon (快船, swift ships), Maengseon (猛船, fierce ships), Wa Byeolseon (倭別船, Japanese-type ships), Jungmaengseon (中猛船), Chuwae Byeolmaengseon (追倭別猛船, anti-Japanese pursuit ships), and Byeolseon (別船, special ships). However, their exact shapes and sizes were not recorded.

During King Sejo’s reign, based on shipbuilding knowledge from China, Japan, and Ryukyu, hybrid ships called Byeongjoseon (兵漕船) were introduced, serving both military and transport purposes, and the Maengseon system was established. The Kyŏngguk Taejŏn records that provinces were allocated large, medium, and small Maengseon. Nationwide, there were 81 large, 195 medium, and 461 small Maengseon, totaling 737. Crews were 80 for large, 60 for medium, and 30 for small. Subtracting ships without soldiers, the total manpower for these vessels was about 24,400, almost exactly half of the 48,800 naval soldiers—matching the two-turn rotation system.

During King Myeongjong’s reign, the Panokseon (板屋船) was developed, and during the Imjin War, Panokseon and Turtle Ships defeated the Japanese navy. The Turtle Ship, although said to have existed earlier, was essentially a Panokseon modified with an arched roof-like deck resembling a turtle shell. Thereafter, naval organization included a mix of large warships such as battleships (Jeonseon, 戰船) and Turtle Ships, medium warships like Bangseon (防船) and Byeongseon, and smaller vessels such as Sahuseon (伺候船, patrol ships).

=== Early dynasty ===
==== Byeongjoseon ====
The byeongjoseon (Korean: 병조선; Hanja: 兵漕船) was a warship developed during King Sejo's era during peacetime. It was a very traditional ship developed to emphasize the standard use of warships for maintaining peace on the coasts when the navy became useless after the end of King Sejong. The Byeongjoseon developed into three sizes, the daebyeongjoseon, jungbyeongjoseon, and sobyeongjoseon. The daebyeongjoseon carries 50-60 sailors and 800 lbs of grain. The jungbyeongjoseon carried 50 men, and the sobyeongjoseon carried 30 men. These ships fell into disuse as the navy developed more efficient warships.

==== Maengseon ====
The Maengseon (Korean: 맹선; Hanja: 猛船) was a warship succeeding the Byeongjoseon, serving from the time of King Seongjong to King Myeongjong. It has an appropriate number of oars installed on both sides as a place to row, and a deck is laid for soldiers to ride and engage in battle. The Maengseon came in three sizes, the Daemaengseon, Jungmaengseon, and Somaengseon deployed to naval bases. The Daemaengseon was large enough to accommodate 80 sailors, and when used as a merchant ship, it could carry 800 lbs of grain. However, the Maengseon became useless and failed to fulfill its role as a warship.

==== Byeolseon ====
The Byeolseon (Korean: 별선; Hanja: 別船) was a warship to suppress the Wokou Piracy. They consist of daebyeolseon, jangbyeolseon, and sobyeolseon, and the average number of sailors on board is around 30. The Chuwabyeolmengseon and Chuwabyeolmengseon are special Byeolseon that chase the Wako, but their functions have not been revealed. However, it is believed that one of them may be a special ship like the turtle ship. Another type of Byeolseon is called the Waebyeolseon, but this is not a captured Wako ship; it is made like a Japanese pirate ship for naval practice.

=== Late dynasty ===
==== Panokseon ====
A multideck warship that carries at least 26 cannons but usually carries more (maybe up to 50) and 50 to 60 rowers and sailors and another 125 marines. By having multiple levels, the rowers at the bottom were relatively safe, and marines at the top would have a height advantage over the enemy, firing down upon them and avoiding boarding the ship. The upper deck had a tower in the ship's middle used for command and observation. The deck of the panokseon was broad and flat, making it ideal for the installation of cannons. Panokseons came in different sizes, the largest vessels estimated to range between 70 feet (21 m) and 100 feet (30 m) in length with a second row of cannons to fire a broadside and to repel boarders.

==== Bangpaeseon ====
The bangpaeseon (shield ship) was a medium-sized warship used in the late Joseon Dynasty, designed with shield boards along the deck to protect soldiers from arrows and stones. It was smaller than major warships but larger than smaller armed vessels. A main-base shield ship carried 55 men, and shield ships at local naval posts carried 31 men. The ship type had existed before the Imjin War but disappeared from records during the war itself. It reappeared during the reign of King Injo when smaller vessels were needed for the shallow waters of Korea’s western coast. Over time, its use spread across several western provinces as large warships proved costly and difficult to operate in shallow harbors. By 1770, records show there were more shield ships than major warships in the Joseon navy.

==== Turtle Ship ====
A pre-industrial assault ship clad in spike protruding hexagonal armored plates on the roof and designed for usually ramming enemy ships while firing at point-blank. Its crew complement usually comprised about 50 to 60 fighting marines and 70 rowers. The turtle ship carries 11 cannons on each side. There were two more cannon portholes on the front and back of the turtle ship. On the ship's top at the bow was a dragon's head used as an early form of psychological warfare. It's used as a projector that could generate and release sulfur to obscure vision and interfere with the enemy ships to maneuver and coordinate properly. It was also used as a third cannon port that could fit a cannon in the mouth of the dragon to be fired at enemy ships. The heavy cannons enabled the turtle ships to unleash a mass volley.

=== Other Ships ===
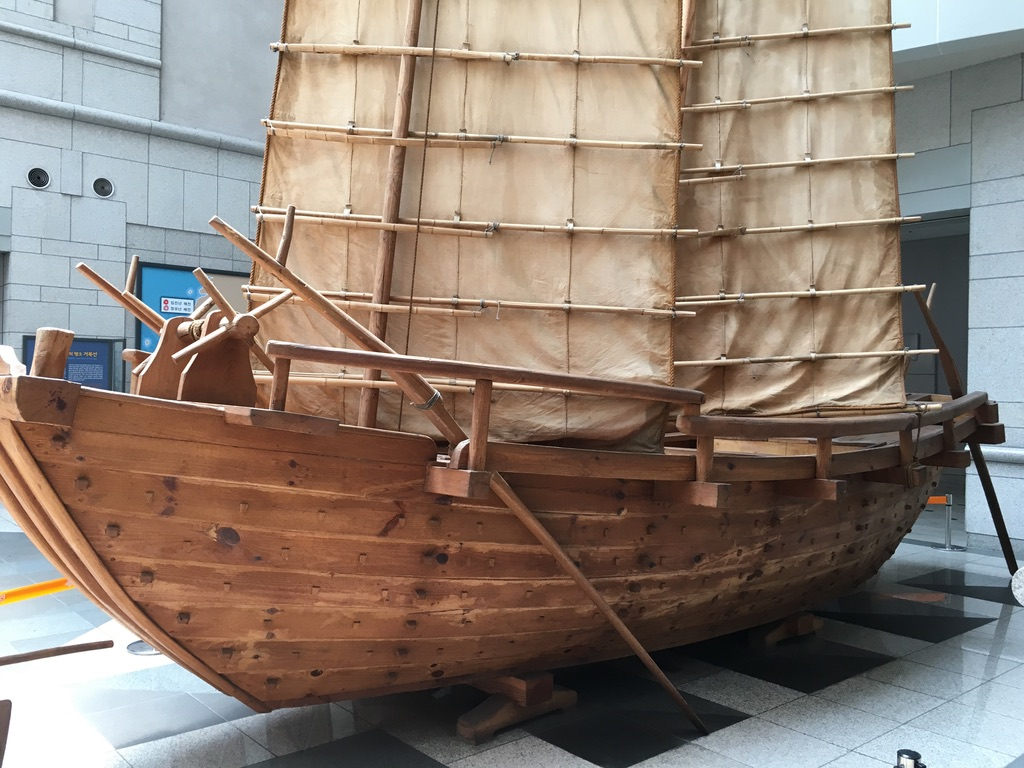
A fishing boat.

- Beomseon (Korean: 범선) are sailing boats for fishing.
- Bigeodoseon (Korean: 비거도선) A barge-like ship that's small and fast to transport supplies to large ships and capture the retreating Japanese. It almost completely disappeared after the Imjin War.
- Byeongseon (Korean: 병선) A small warship that escorts large and medium-sized warships and serves as an auxiliary ship transporting supplies and marines.
- Geomseon (Korean: 검선) evolved from the Goryeo-era gwaseon (Korean: 과선; Hanja: 戈船). There were iron spikes on the roof like the turtle ship, but the geomseon was smaller and usually had a complement of about 15 people.
- Hyeopseon (Korean: 협선) an auxiliary boat attached to a large warship. Its role was primarily reconnaissance in the early days of the Imjin War. Then it shifted to communication with land, transporting materials to a ship under construction, and civilians.
- Nuseon (Korean: 누선) a large warship with a pavilion.
- Sahuseon (Korean: 사후선) a scout ship that sailed ahead of the fleet to observe the enemy's movements, and when they found an enemy ship, it notifies the fleet.

== Equipment ==
=== Uniforms ===
Sailors and military officials wear military uniforms (kunbok, Korean: 군복; Hanja: 軍服). The oarsmen, gunners, archers, marines wore black military robes (hyeopsu Korean: 협수; Hanja: 夾袖) with white trimes. But the gunners, archers, and marines on deck wore light blue long sleeveless vests (jeonbok, Korean: 전복; Hanja: 戰服). Red vests representing master-at-arms and yellow vests for military bands. Commissioned officers (usually military yangban) wore a red and yellow military officials coat (dongdari, Korean: 동다리; Hanja: 同多里) for middle to high-ranking officers and red and blue dongdari for junior-ranking officers with a black jeonbok and a military belt (jeondae, Korean: 전대; Hanja: 戰帶). During emergencies and wartime, officers, the naval officers and marines wore war clothing (yungbok, Korean: 융복; Hanja: 戎服) with a (cheolrik, Korean: 철릭; Hanja: 天翼) distinguishing rank by color. Red yungbok with a blue military belt represents high-ranking officers. Blue yungbok with a red military belt represents mid-ranking officers. Black yungbok with a black military belt represents junior ranking officers and elite soldiers and cavalry. High and middle-ranking officers wore hats called jeonrip. Sailors and officers of low-rank wore hats called beonggeoji or jukeon.

=== Armor ===
The sailors wore no armor or helmets. However, the Joseon military policy required sailors and marines to provide their armor. Padded armor (eomshimgap, Korean: 엄심갑; Hanja: 掩心甲), and padded helmet (eomshimju, Korean: 엄심주; Hanja: 掩心冑), made from cotton layers, iron plates, and (or) leather was popular among archers and gunners as they offered body protection at lower prices. Sets of leather armor worn by sailors are called Pigabju (Korean: 피갑주; Hanja: 皮甲胄). Senior naval officers and marines wore a traditional form of Korean armor that persisted with the Mongols' influences during the 13~14th centuries, lamellar armor (jalgap, Korean: 찰갑; Hanja: 札甲). It was a complete metallic armor set. It was composed of a helmet resembling European kettle hats with attached neck defenses of mail or lamellar, body armor reaching down to the thighs or knees, and a set of shoulder guards that protected the upper arm.

In the late dynasty, the dujeonggap (Korean: 두정갑; Hanja: 頭釘甲) is the Korean equivalent of brigandine. The high-ranking officers wore brass scales, and middle-low-ranking officers wore iron. The marines all wore brigandine made from cotton layers, and the plates weaved into the brigandine were either iron, copper, or leather. It became the primary form of Korean armor and often reached below the knees when worn. The helmet assumes a conical shape and has three brigandine flaps that protect the sides and back of the head.

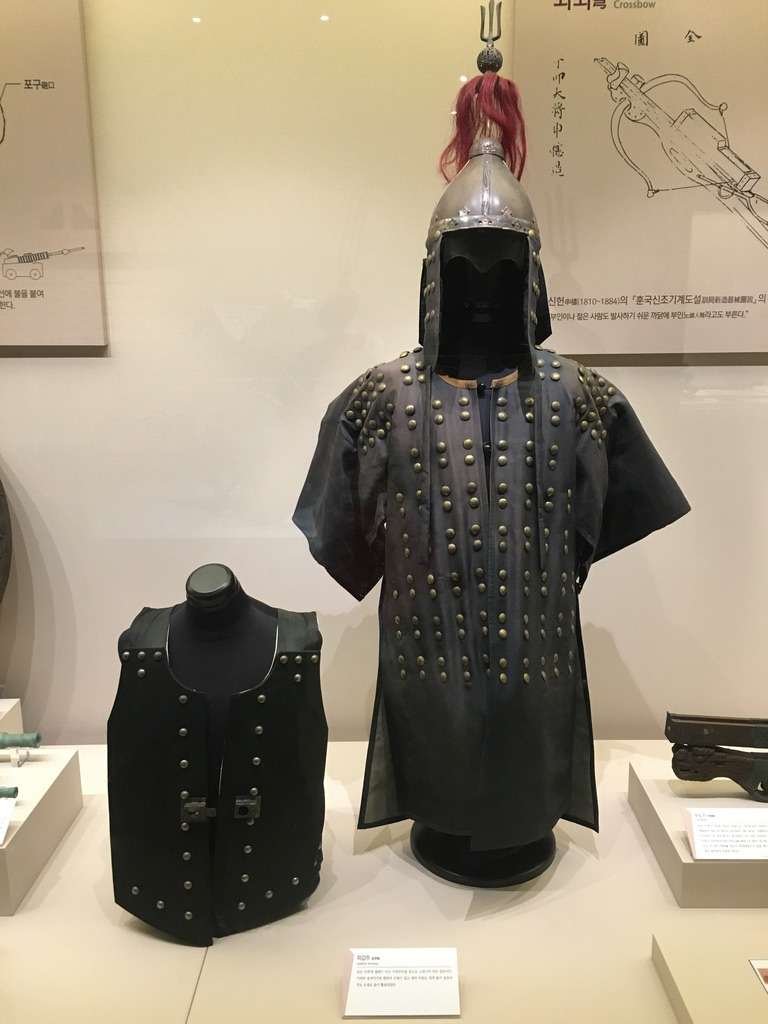
Sets of leather armor, Pigabju, worn by sailors and marines.

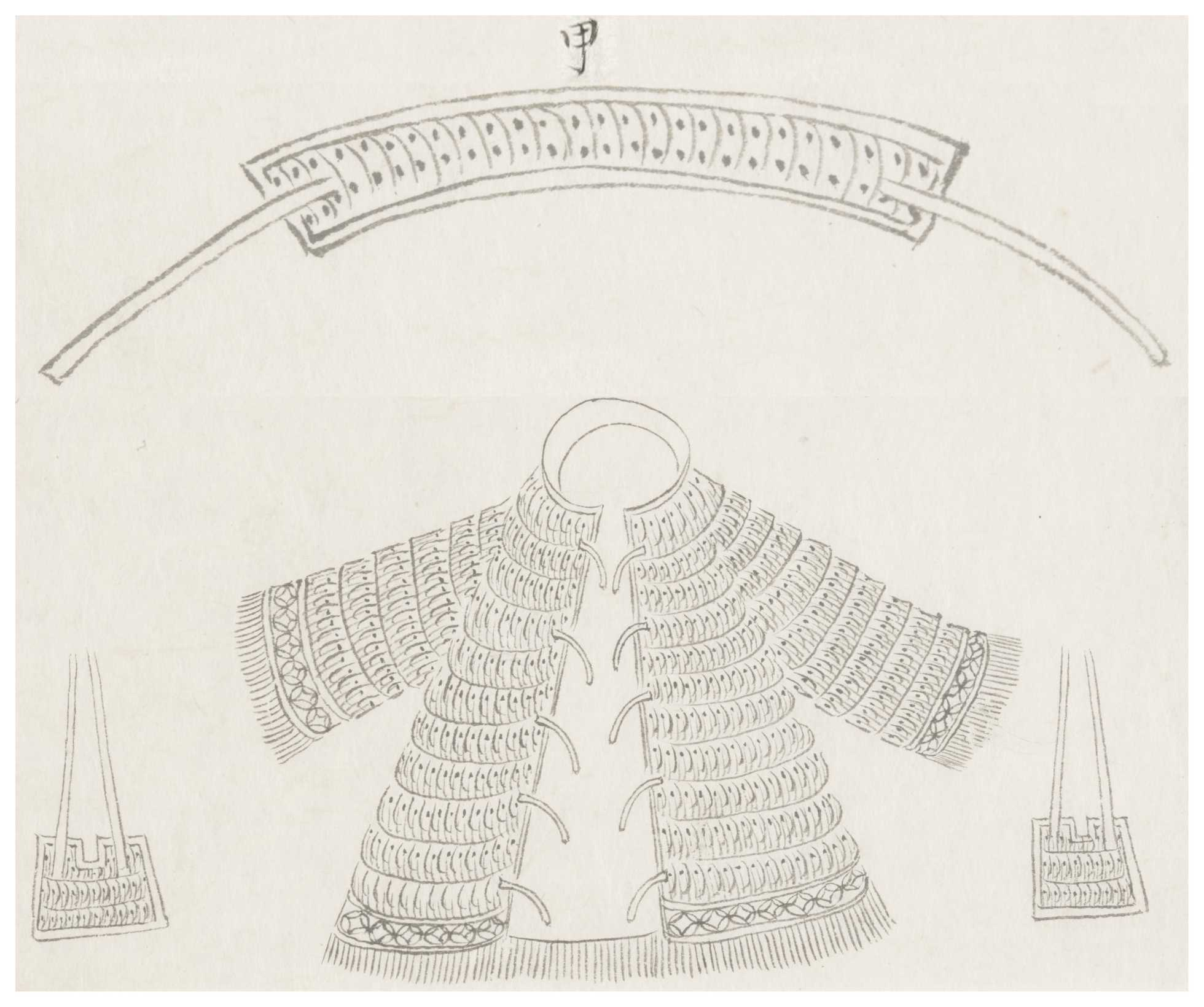
Jalgap, the lamellar armor of Joseon worn by senior officers and marines.

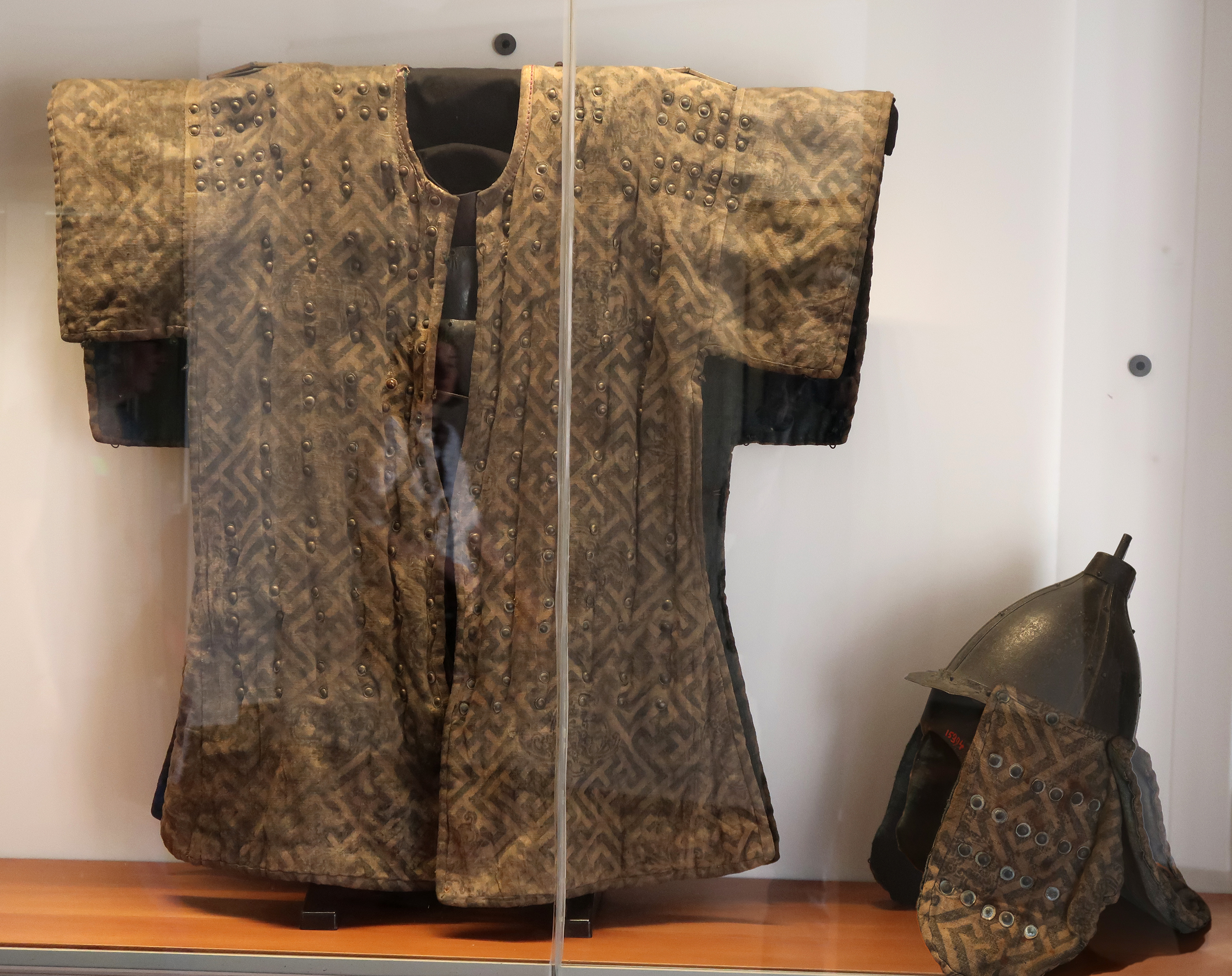
armor and helmet. Joseon period, 19th century. Musée Guimet.

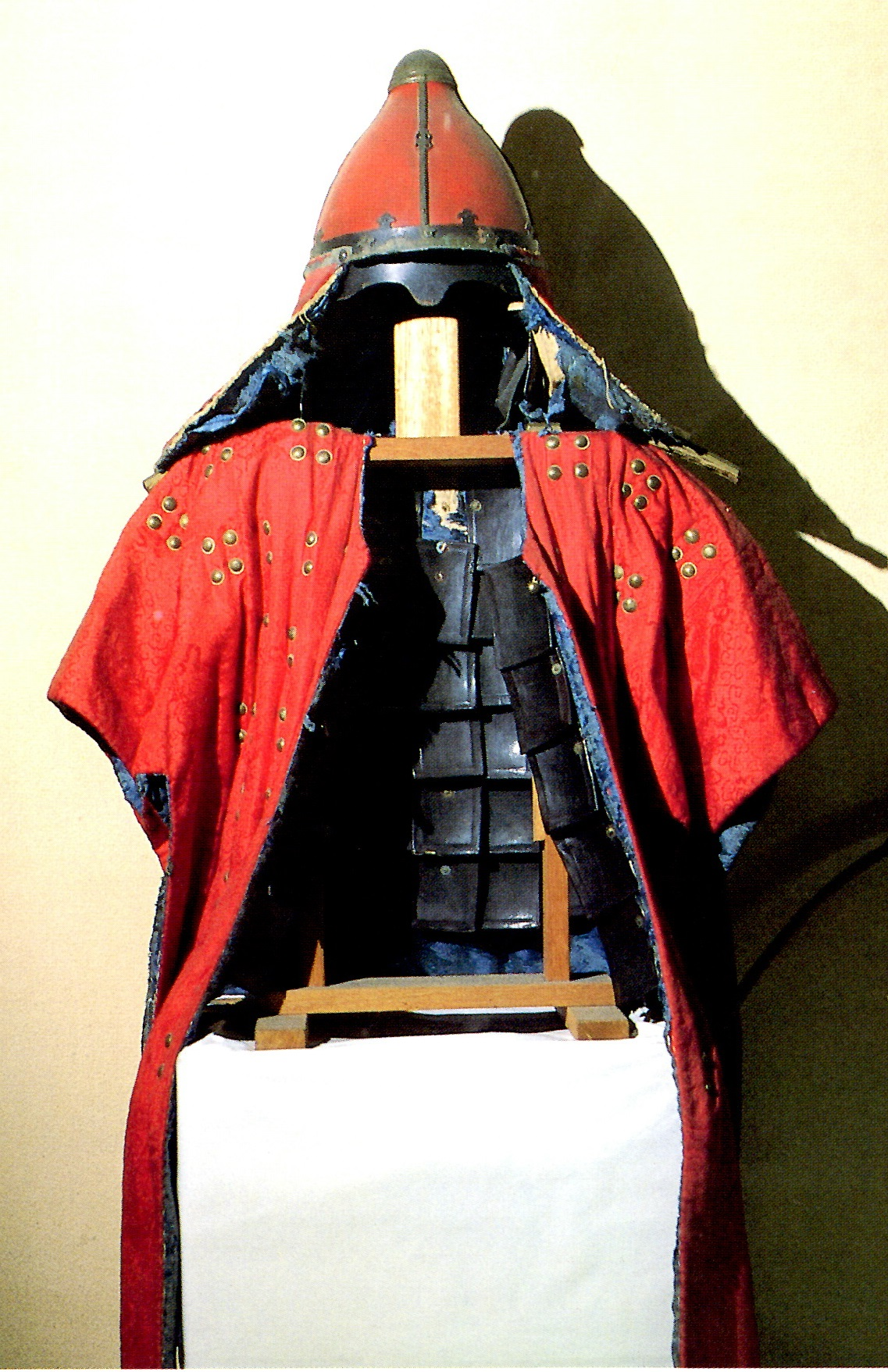
Joseon dynasty Dujeong-gap

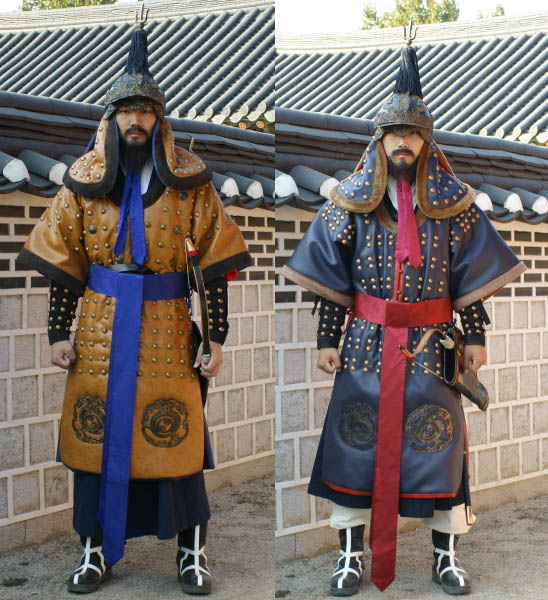
Modern reenactors wearing a complete Dujeong-gap set. While conventionally shown as red, the fabric could be of various colors.

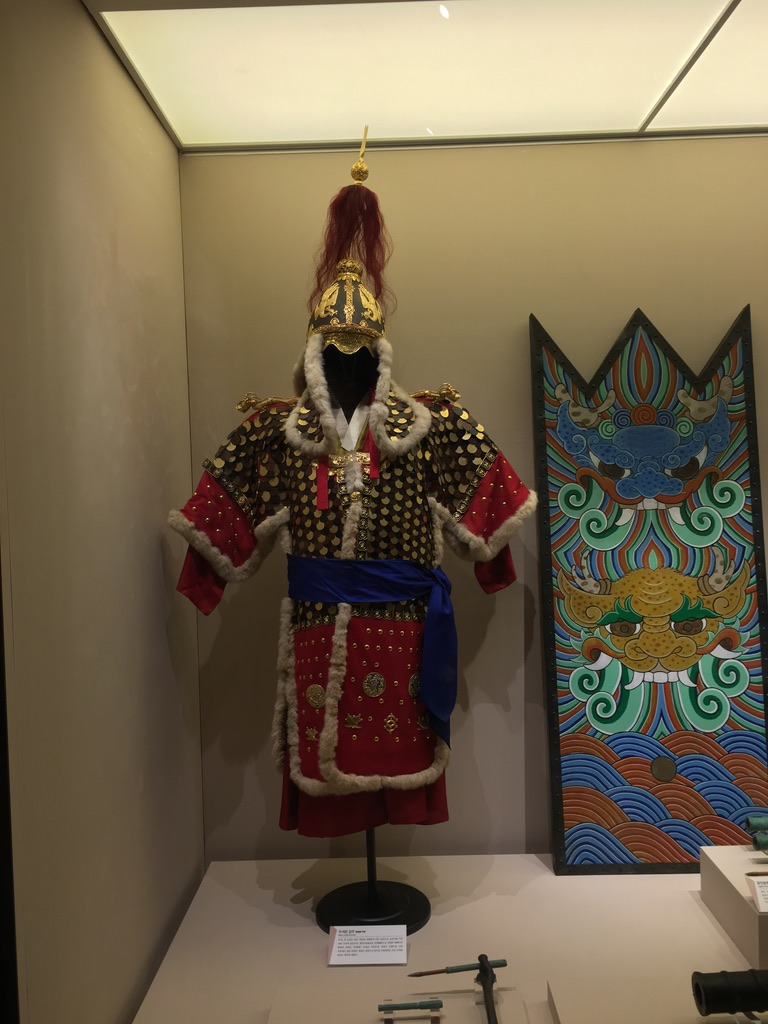
Brass scale armor worn by military officers

=== Melee weapons ===
The standard Korean sword was the hwando, a short and light curved sword commonly used by Joseon marines during peacetime. The standard polearm used in the navy was the jangchang (Korean: 장창; Hanja: 長槍), a four-meter spear wielded for thrusting and drawing while moving forward and backward. But due to its long length, they cannot use this spear for throwing. The woldo was a 9 ft curved-bladed polearm with a spike at the end of the handle and a tassel or feather attached to the blade. The auxiliary Korean spear was the dangpa, a 7–8 ft three-pronged trident with a spear tip in the middle used for close defensive combat to trap an enemy's sword between two of the three prongs. They also carry a pengbae (Korean: 팽배; Hanja: 彭排), a round shield, or a deungpaea (Korean: 등패; Hanja: 藤牌), a rattan shield along with a sword.

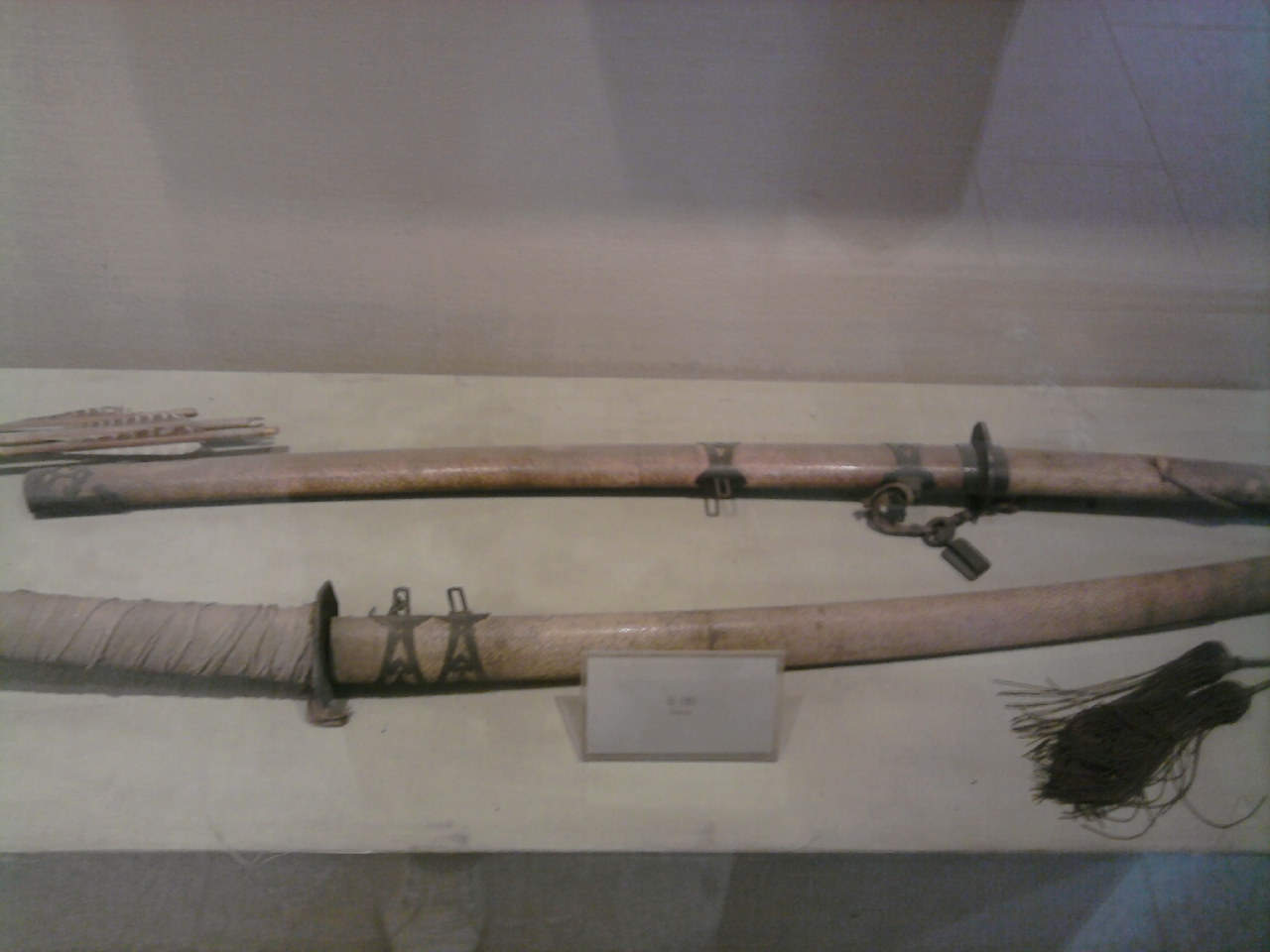
Hwando, standard sword of Joseon military

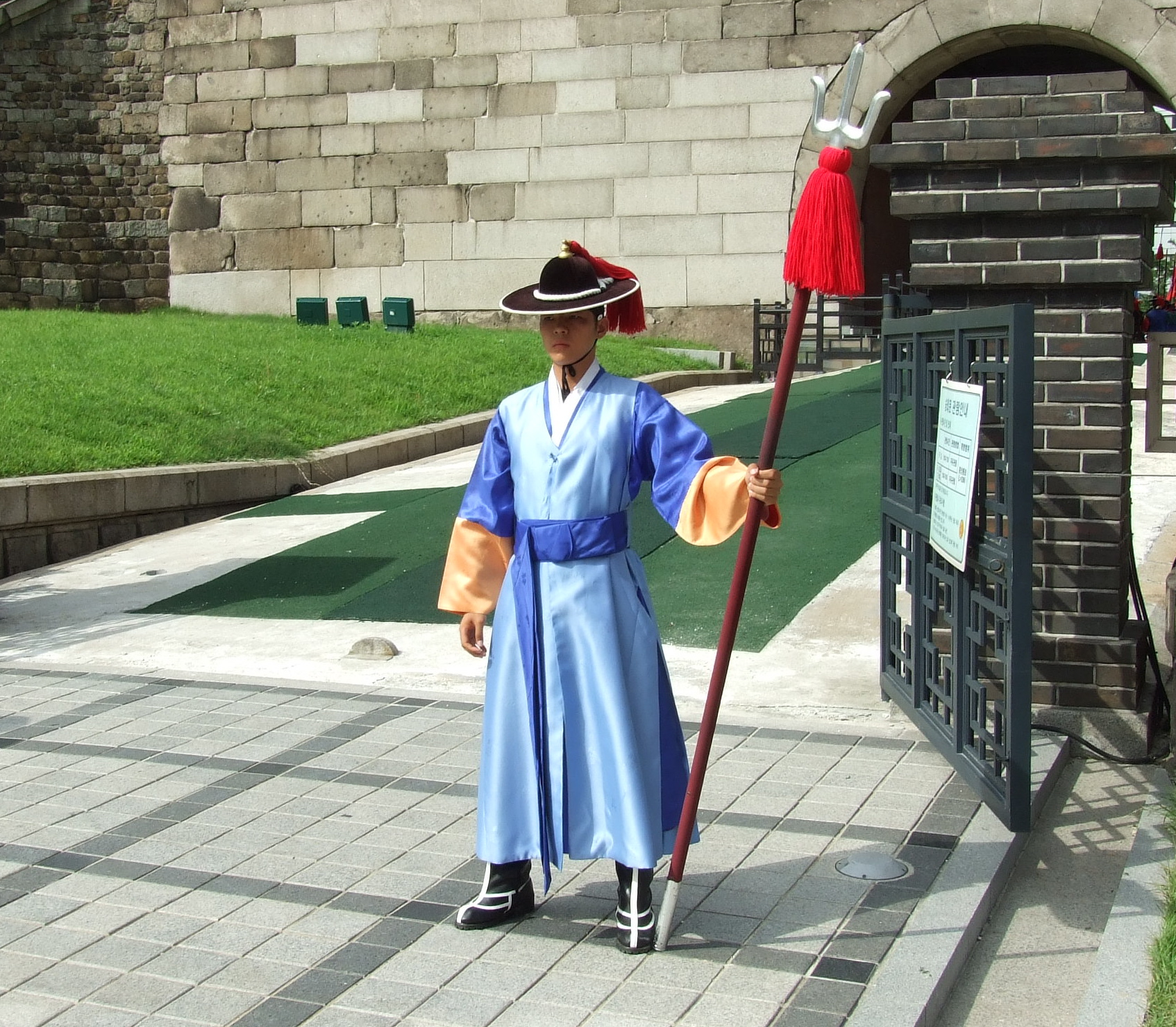
Dangpa, auxiliary polearm of the Joseon Military

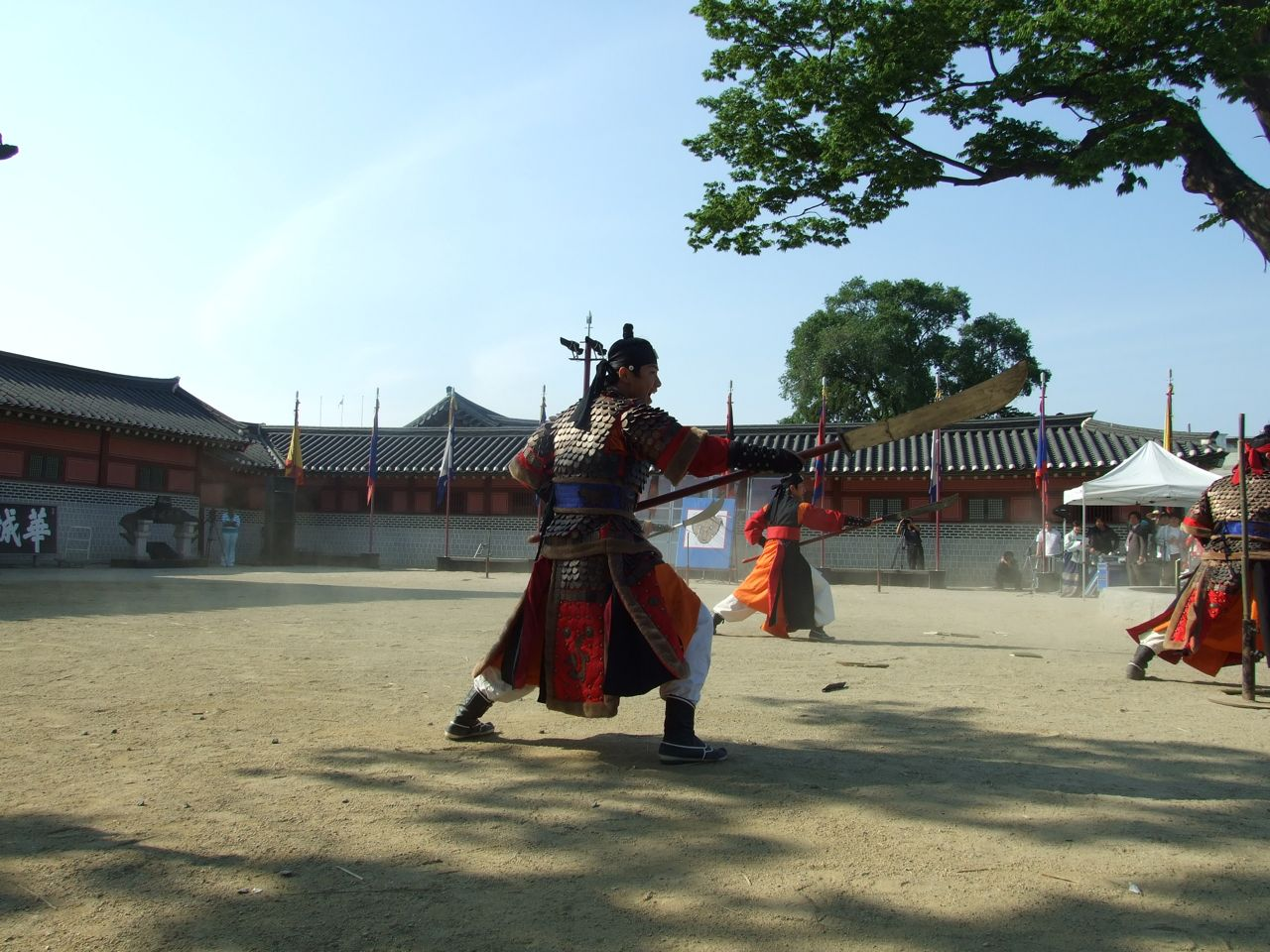
Woldo, a polearm

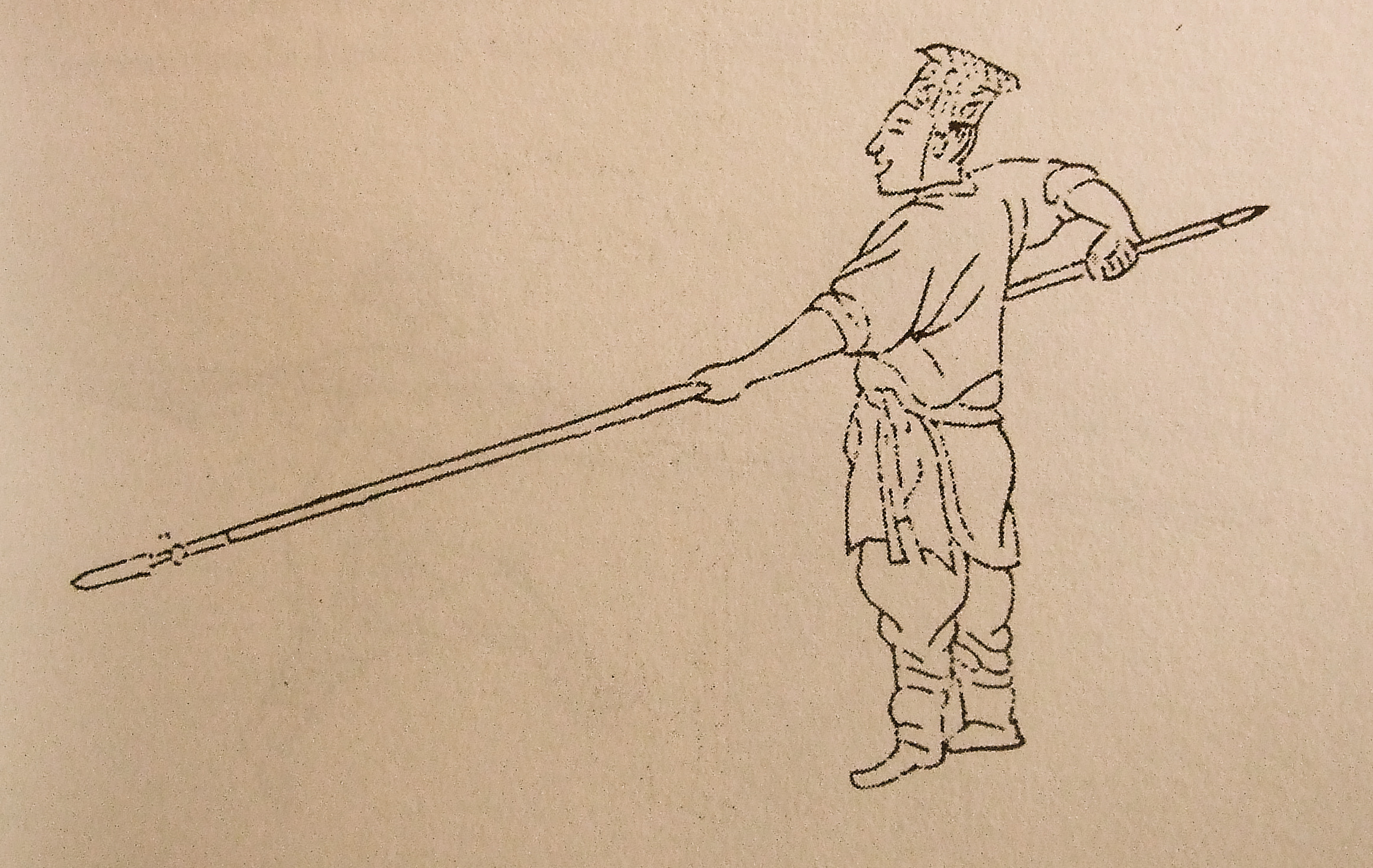
Jangchang, a long spear

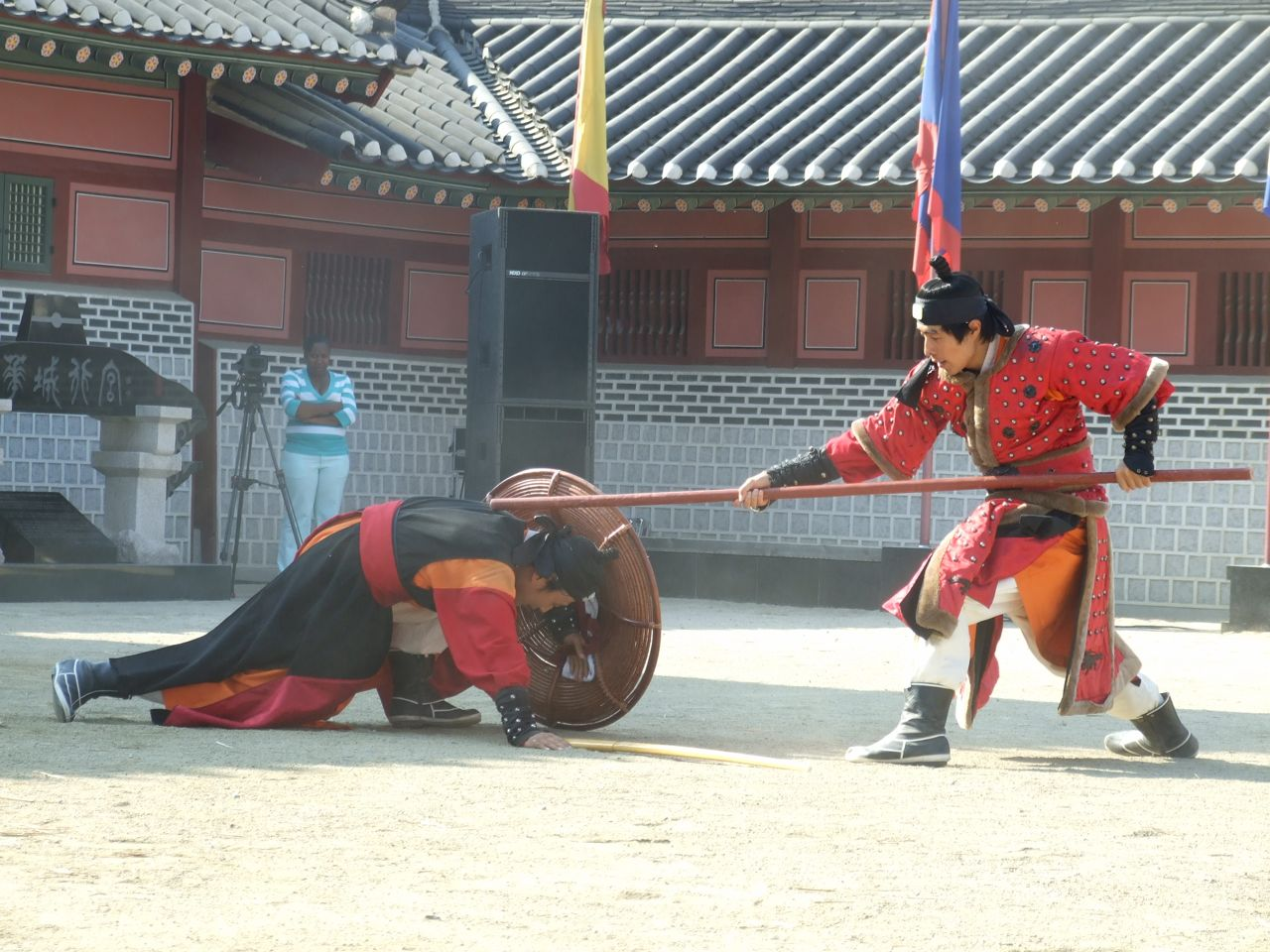
Deungpae, a rattan shield

=== Projectile weapons ===
==== Archery ====
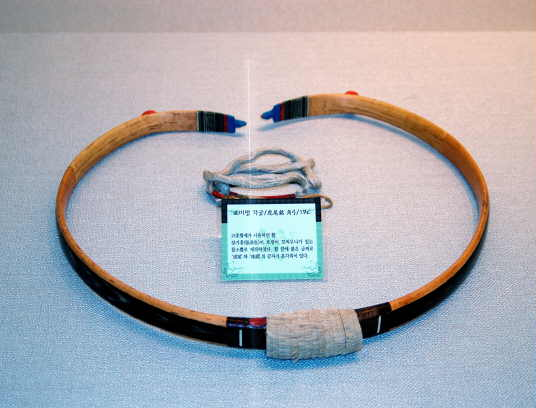
Gakgung, the standard bow for the Joseon Army

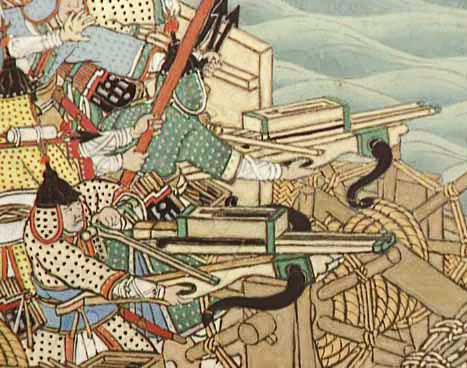
Naval battle scroll depicting Korean soldiers utilizing repeating recurve crossbows during the Imjin War

Joseon sailors and officers often fought as archers with their bows, which had a range of 450 metres (1,480 ft). Archers also used the pyeonjeon, a short arrow, and the tongah to help guide it as part of the standard kit of Chosun era archers. They can fire at an extended range of 350 meters and flatter trajectories with a faster velocity and penetrating power than regular arrows. Their quivers held 20 arrows and 10 pyeonjeon arrows. They also used repeating crossbows and crossbows.

==== Gunpowder ====
In 1395, several weapons were in use: a series of cannons called the daejanggunpo, ijanggunpo, and samjanggunpo, a shell-firing mortar called the jillyeopo, series of yuhwa, juhwa, and chokcheonhwa rockets, which were the forerunners of the singijeon, and a signal gun called the shinpo. These cannons improved during Taejong's rule. Among the people responsible for the developments was Ch'oe Hae-san, son of Ch'oe Mu-sŏn.

The Koreans use the hwacha – multiple rocket-propelled arrows. The hwacha consisted of a two-wheeled cart carrying a board filled with holes into which the singijeon were inserted. It could fire up to 200 singijeon, a type of rocket arrow, all at once. The hwacha also has a variant called the munjong hwacha; it can fire 100 rocket arrows or 200 small Chongtong bullets at one time with changeable modules. The navy used them on panokseons under Admiral Yi Sun-sin to attack Japanese ships from a distance.

The cheon "heaven" or "sky," Ji "earth," Hyeon "black," and Hwang "yellow" or "gold" names are not significant, being the first four characters of the Thousand Character Classic. His son, Sejong, also made many improvements and increased the ranges of these cannons (called hwapo and later hwatong "fire tube" and chongtong "gun tube"). In the early 1500s, the bullanggi (불랑기/佛狼機), a breech-loading swivel gun, was introduced to Korea from Portugal via China. It was divided into sizes 1 through 5, in decreasing size. The small but powerful cannons of this era saw extensive use during the Japanese invasions of Korea (1592–98) by both the Joseon Navy and the army. Mortars used at this time were the chongtong-wan'gue, byeoldae-wan'gu, dae-wan'gu, jung-wan'gu, and so-wan'gu. These fired stones or the bigeukjincheonre a timed explosive shell. They were very effective against the weaker-built Japanese ships. The Nanjung ilgi says that many captured and used by the Japanese realized their full potential. The Hong'ipo (Korean: 홍이포; Hanja: 紅夷砲) was a cannon introduced from the Netherlands by Hendrick Hamel and others in the 1650s. Joseon also used this cannon during the 1866 French campaign against Korea, the 1871 United States expedition to Korea and the Ganghwa Island incident of September 20, 1875.

In 1432, the Joseon dynasty under the reign of Sejong the Great introduced world's first handgun, named the seungja chongtong (총통) or "victory gun," which serves as a standard Korean gun. It fires bullets, 15 small pellets, and an iron-tipped arrow. The gunners used the seungja chongtong as a two-handed club in melee combat. Other variants were the soseungja chongtong, a handheld cannon attached to a gunstock that fired a bullet and a large arrow; like the seungja, it could only fire by lighting the fuse. Another variant was the soseungja chongtong, a handheld cannon attached to a gunstock that fired a bullet and a large arrow, but like the seungja it can only fire by lighting the fuse. In 1596, the seungja were phased out in favor of Japanese-style muskets and arquebuses. The Koreans called these jochong (조총/鳥銃), which means 'An accurate gun can even shoot down a flying bird.'

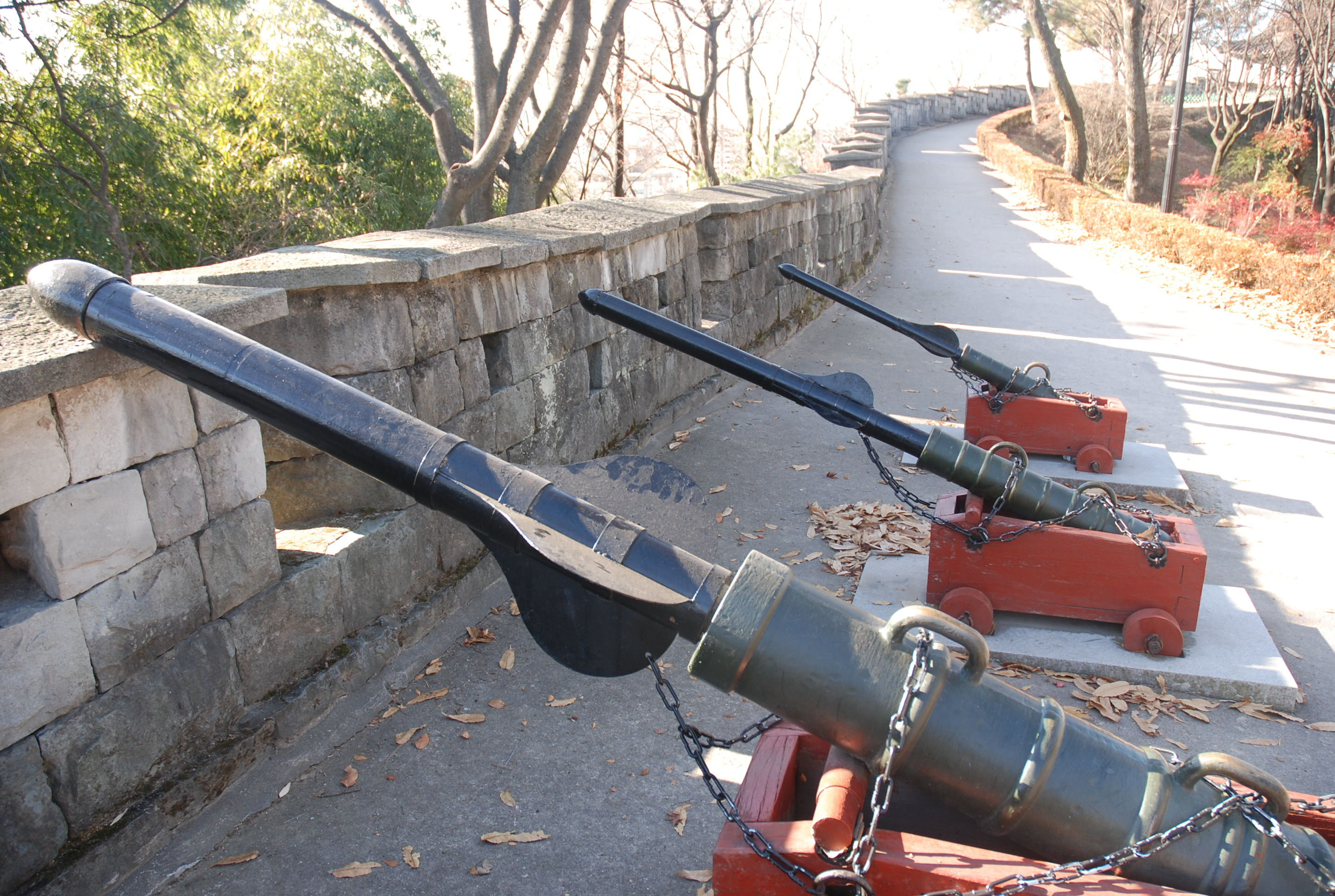
Three large chongtong at the Jinju Fortress museum. The closest is a cheonja-chongtong, the second is a jija-chongtong, and the third is a hyeonja-chongtong.

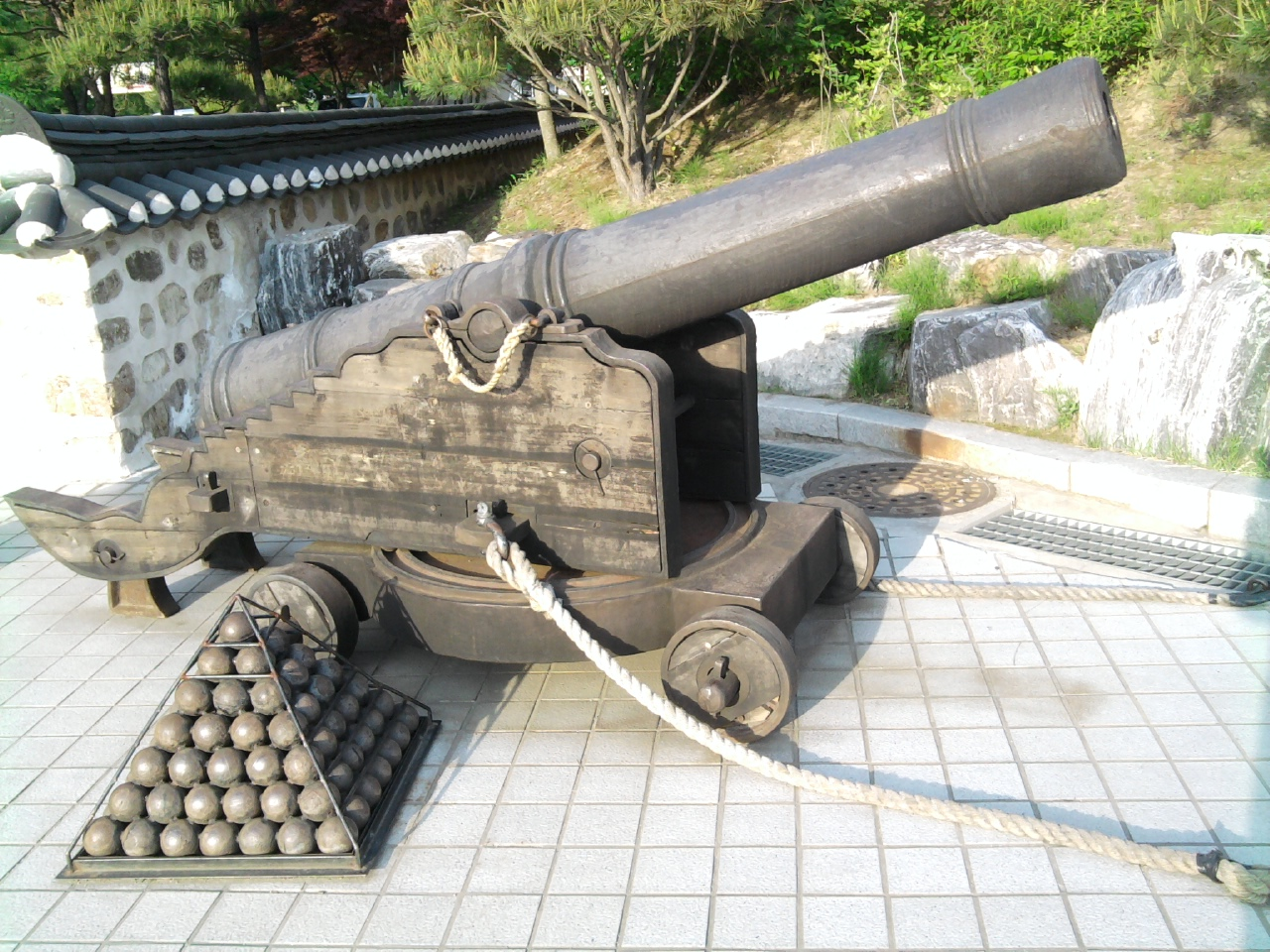
A hong'ipo cannon introduced from the Netherlands by Hendrick Hamel and others in the 1650s

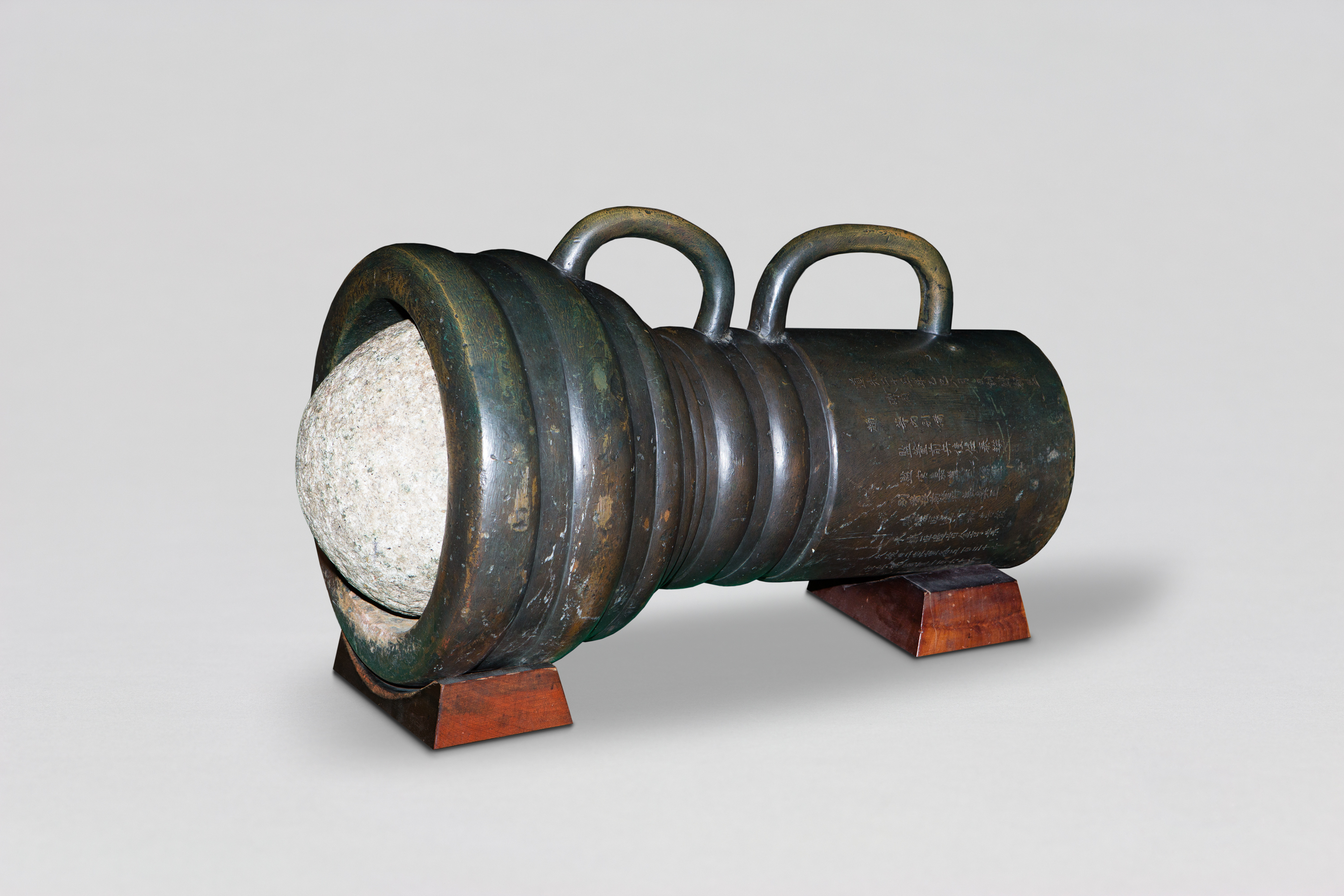
Large mortar with a stone round

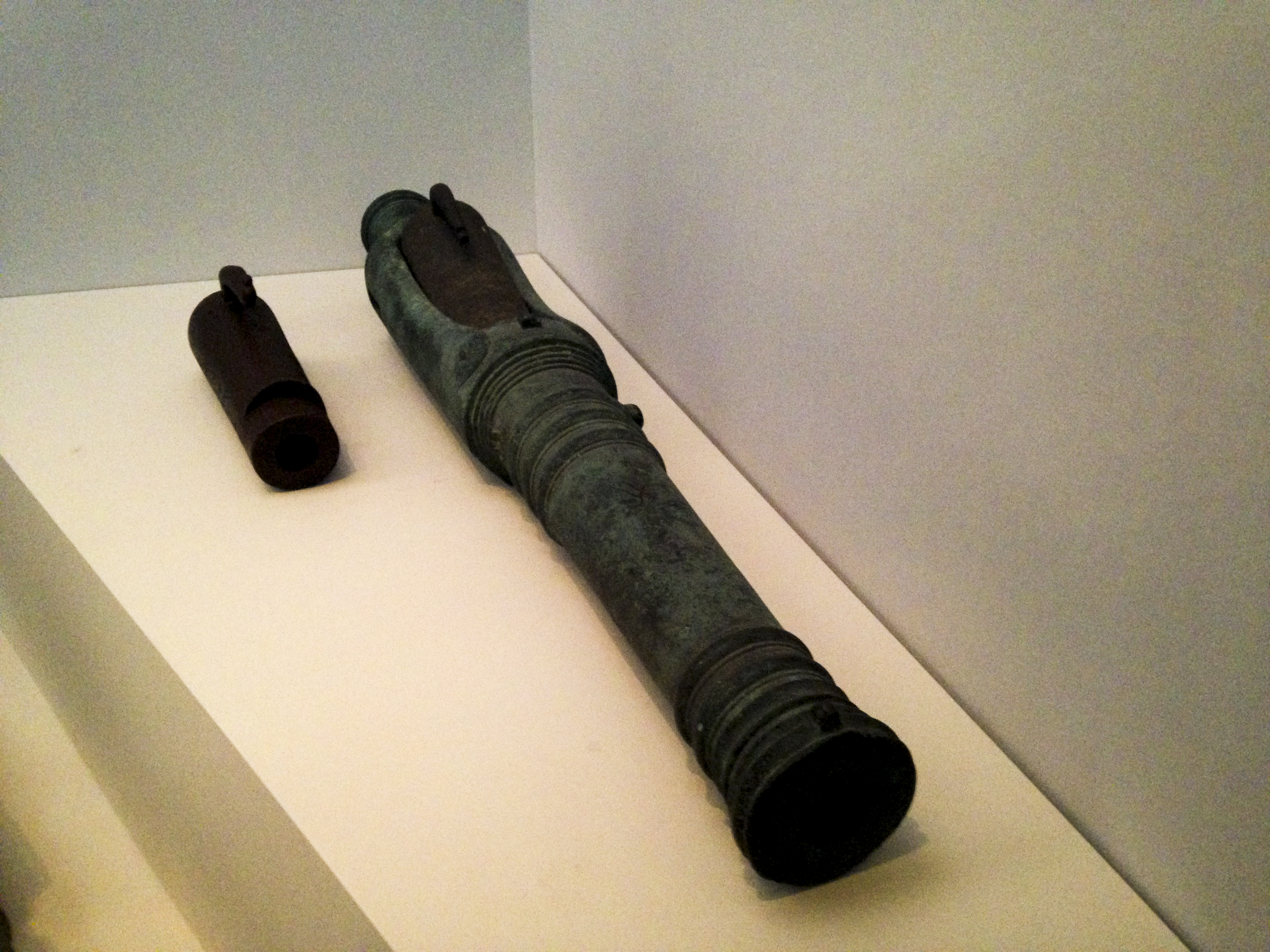
Breech-loading swivel gun

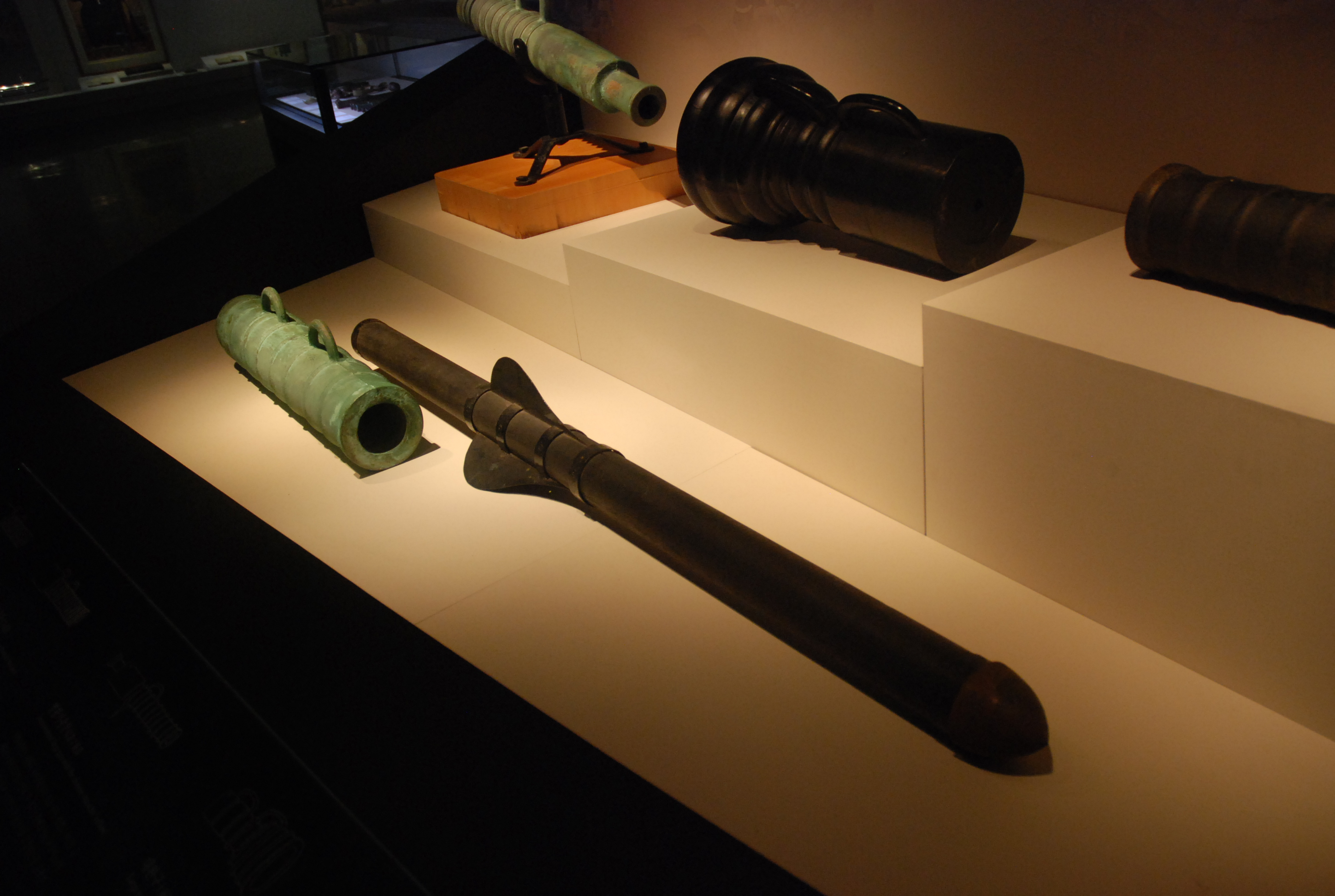
This Cheonja-chongtong is the largest size.

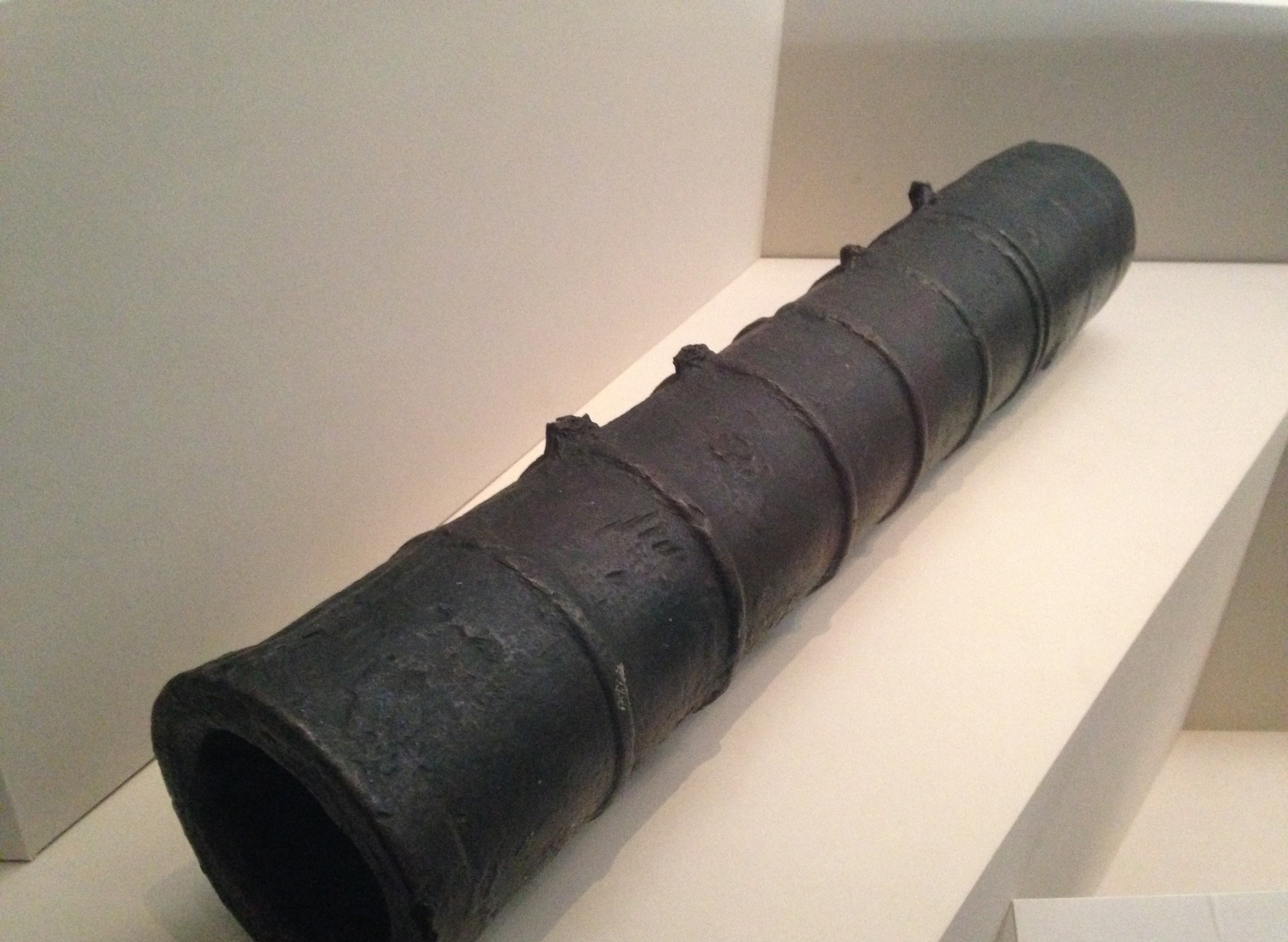
Jijachongtong, the second largest cannon in Mid Joseon Dynasty.

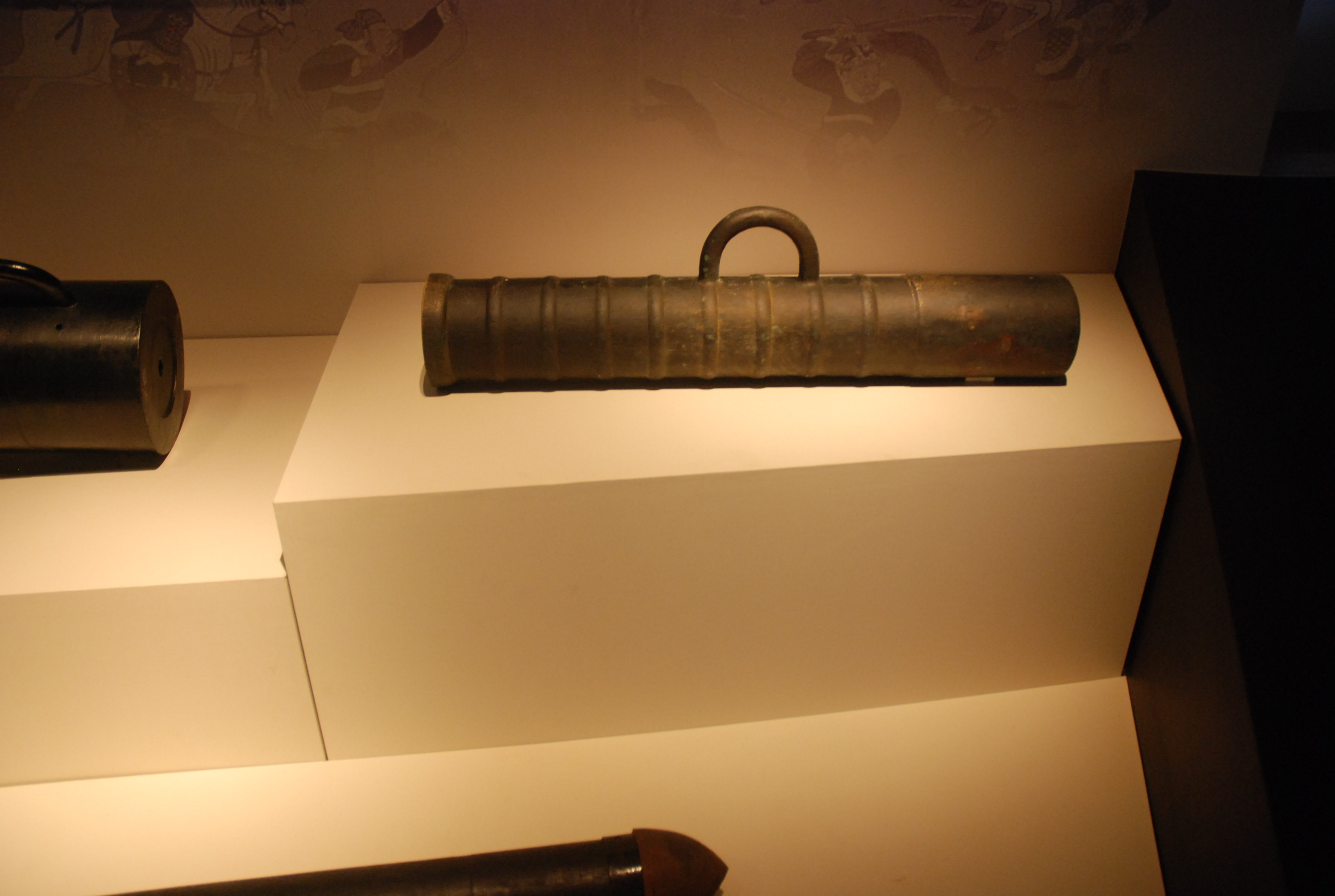
This Hyeonja-chongtong is a middle-sized cannon.

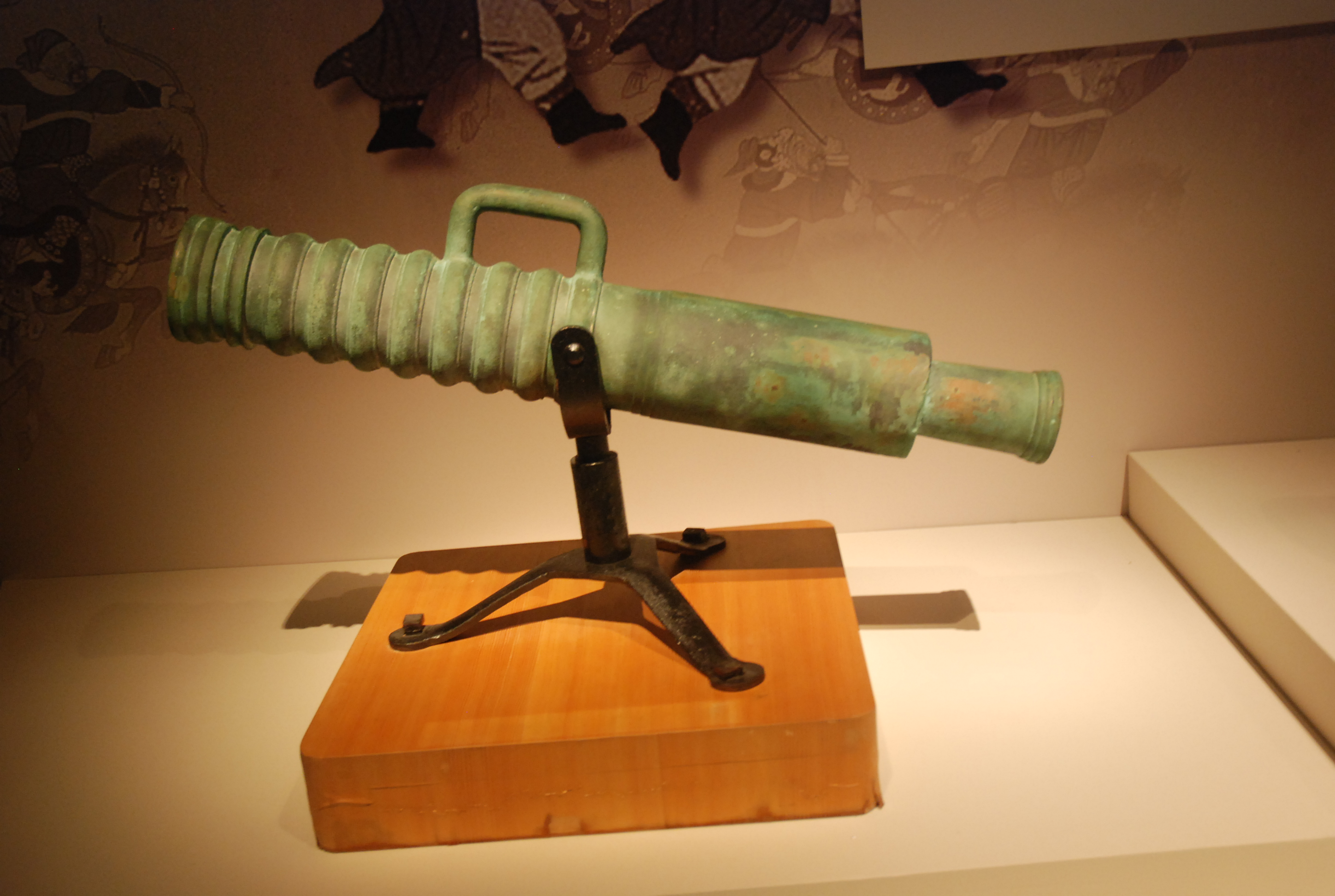
Byeolhwangja-chongtong, which was one of the miniature cannons

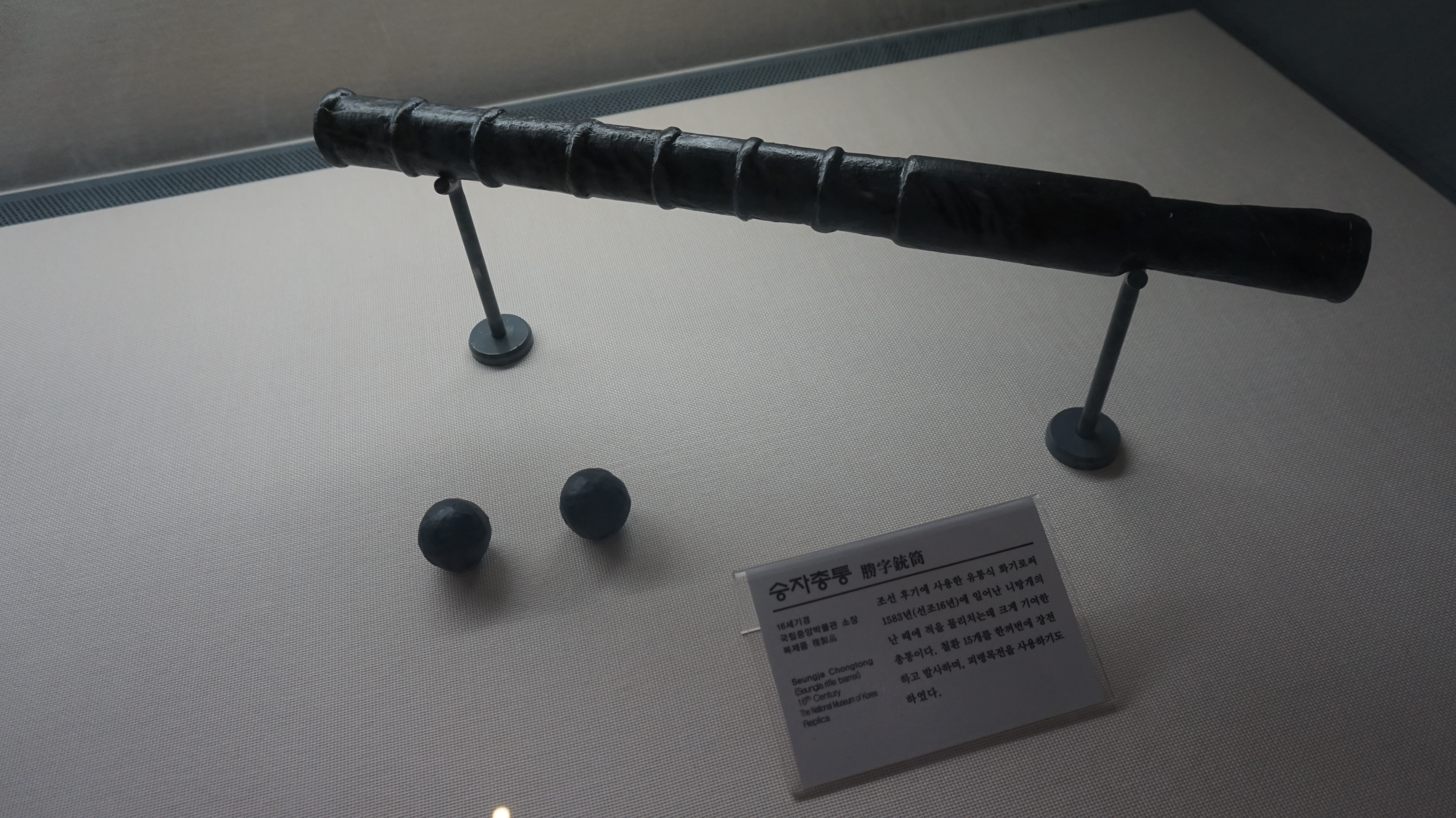
Seungja-chongtong, a hand cannon

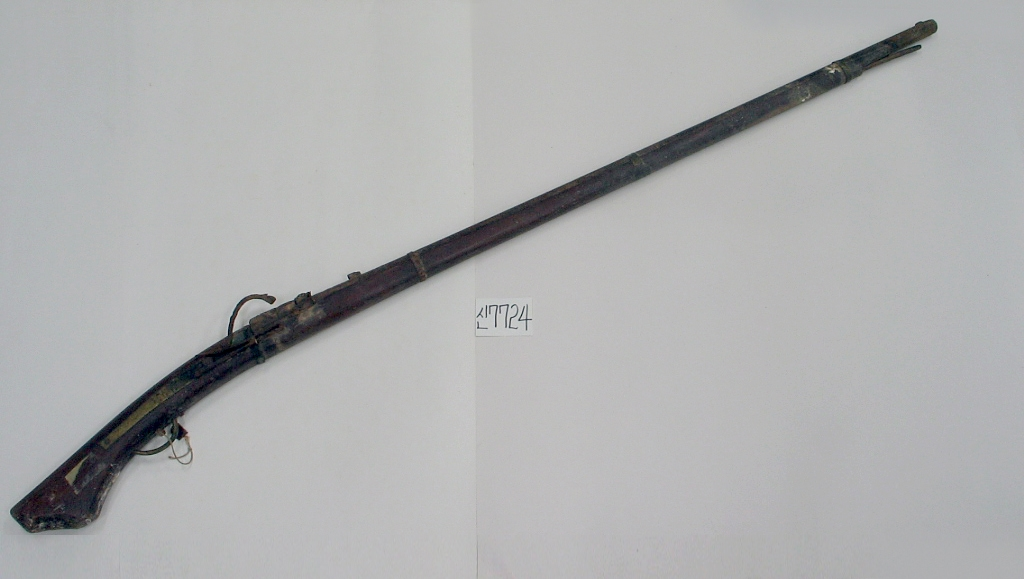
Jochong (조총/鳥銃), the Korean matchlock muskets.

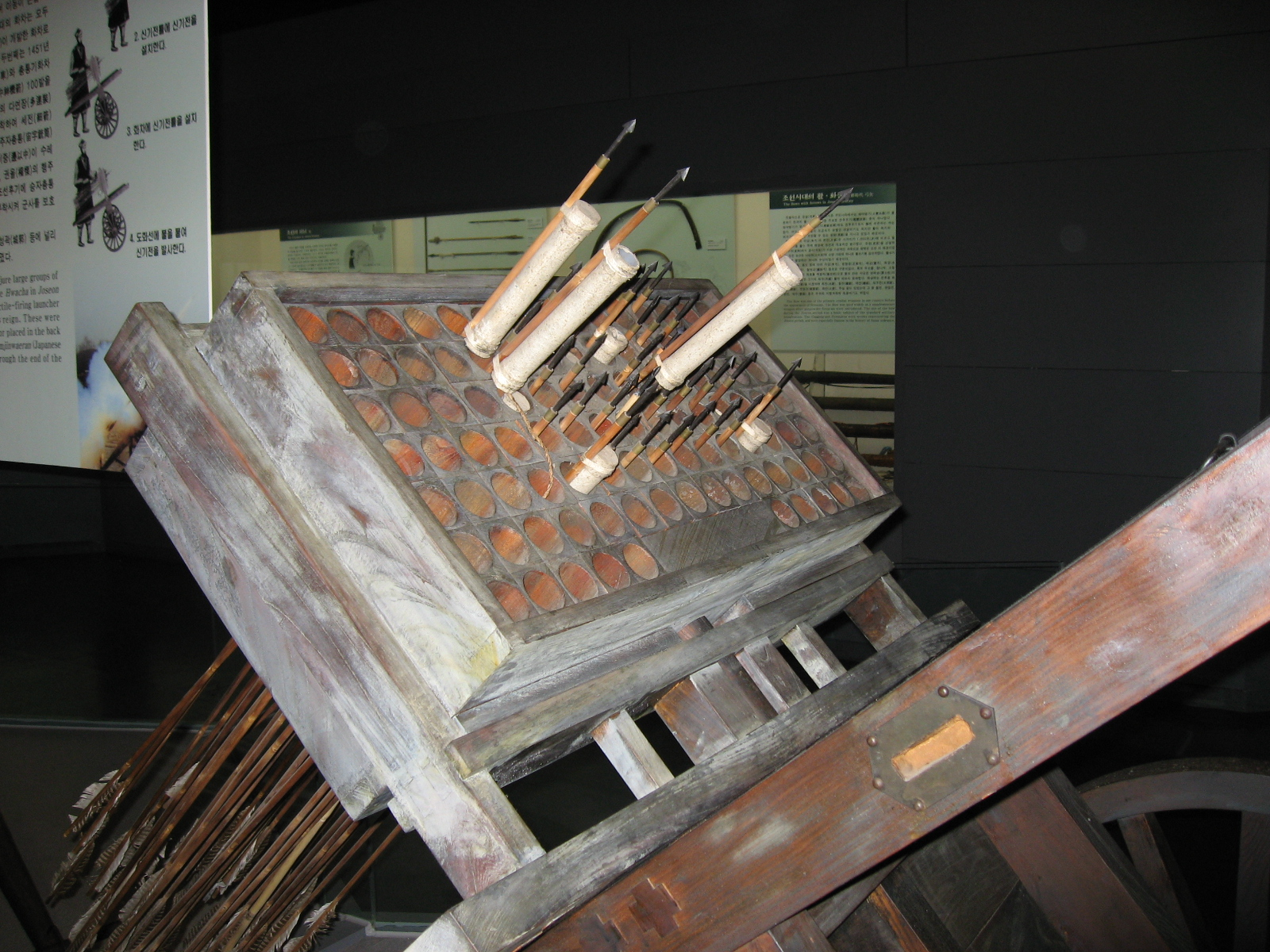
Hwacha launch pad, ignitors placed in the narrow section of each arrow to fire.

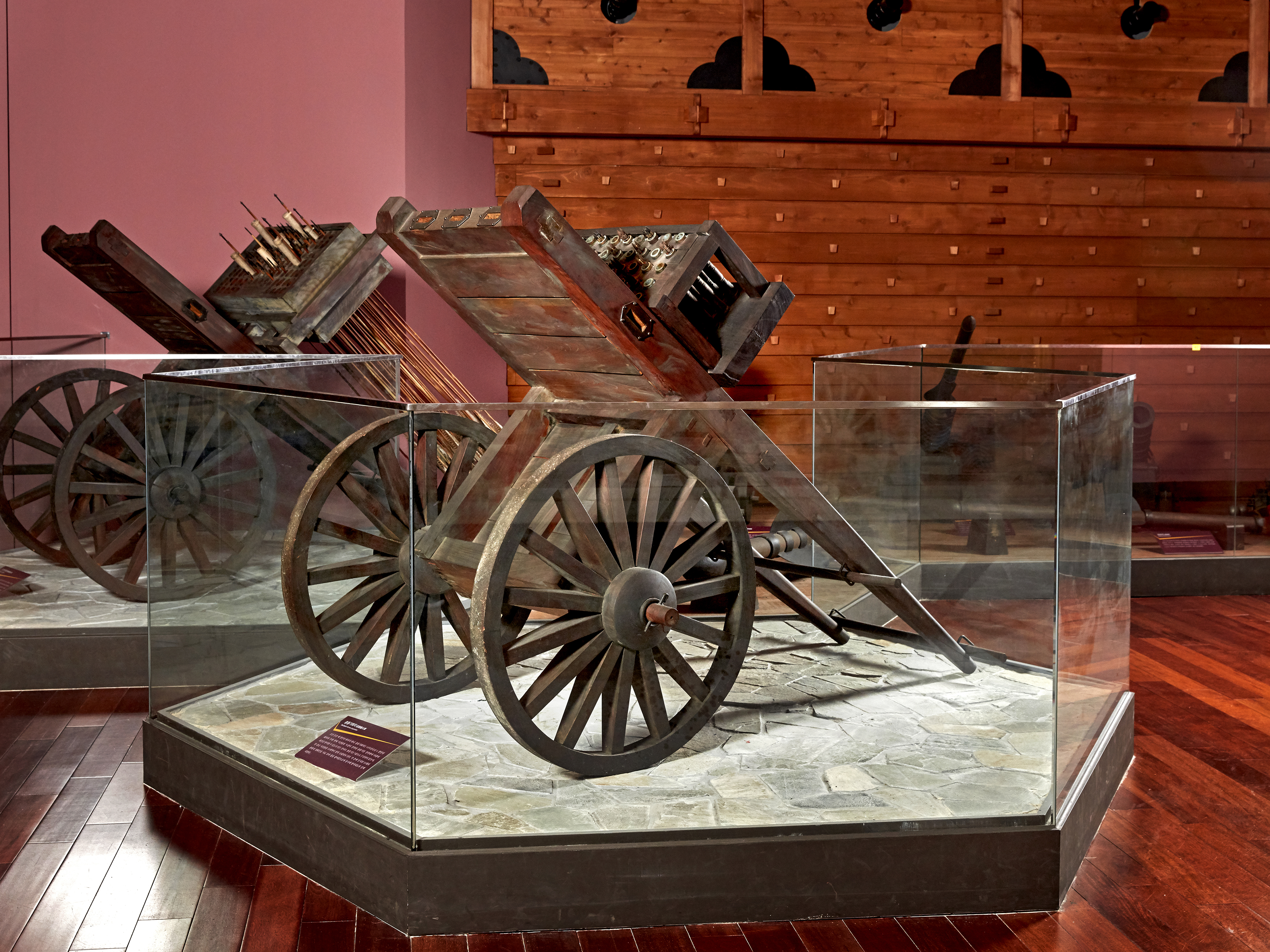
Chongtong-gi(총통기) Hwacha. Each of the 50 guns was loaded with four bullets, firing a total of 200 bullets. (Seoul War Memorial)

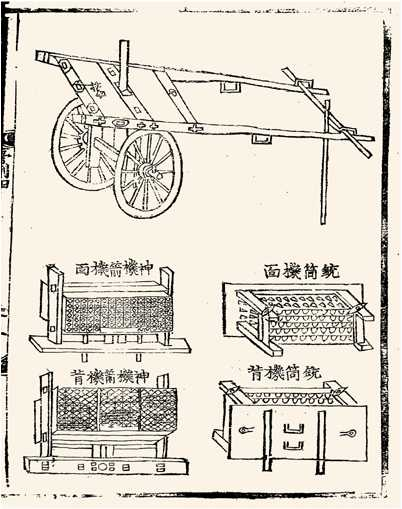
Plans for Hwacha assembly and disassembly (Gukjo-orye-seorye, 1474).

== Strategy and tactics ==
During the Imjin War, Admiral Yi Sun-sin disrupted Japanese supply lines and engaged their fleets at strategic locations of his choosing, such as straits with small islands, and used currents to cripple them. He utilized range and artillery to keep the Japanese from boarding their ships and engaging in Hand-to-hand combat. He used ambush tactics throughout his campaign to demoralize them. He used three naval battle formations, "crane-wing formation" (Hakik-jin, (Korean: 학익진; Hanja: 鶴翼陣), "long snake" formation (Jangsajin, (Korean: 장사진; Hanja: 長蛇陣), and the "line abreast formation" (Hoengyeoljin, (Korean: 횡열진; Hanja: 字整陣). To support his formations, he used broadsides and plunging fire to sink the enemy ships.

Yi Sun-Shin's objective was to sink the enemy ships through plunging fire through heavy artillery fire and fire arrows. At the Battle of Okpo, Yi Sun-shin fired a broadside to prevent the Japanese from escaping the village. He recorded that "30 enemy ships burnt down to cover the sky with smoke", and in the Battle of Noryang, a record stated, "approximately 200 enemy ships burned with many killed and captured." He used this tactic for seven years on record.

Yi Sun-shin's ambush tactic was to preemptively strike the Japanese leader to demoralize their fleet. In the Battle of Dangpo, he ordered the turtle ship to penetrate the enemy fleet by spearheading the attack on the enemy flagship while decimating the surrounding fleet. The ship's arrow struck Japanese admiral Kurujima Michiyuki and fell into the sea. In the Battle of Busan and Myeongnyang, the Joseon fleet focused their firepower on the enemy's flagships and destroyed them. They also hanged their commander's head so his fleet could see like the Daimyo Kurushima Michifusa at the top of the mast. A Japanese fleet followed their admiral, but without its admiral, was a specific target for the Joseon fleet to destroy their enemies when they were confused.

Partisan tactics (Dangpa, (Korean: 당파전술; Hanja: 撞破) were shock tactics to break the enemy. In the Battle of Sacheon, the turtle ship penetrates the enemy fleet while the panokseon supports them with suppressive fire to whither them down. Yi Soon-shin recorded at Dangpo, "The turtle ship came close to the enemy flagship, raised its dragon head, and fired the Hyeonja cannon. Let's hit the enemy ships and break them." Distance and range also became a partisan tactic at the Battle of Busan. Their goal was to destroy the enemy ships rather than kill them, resulting in more than 100 enemy ships sinking. Yi Soon-shin utilized this strategy based on the accurate perception of the capability of both sides to gain their victories.

The long-snake formation consists of many ships in a battle line. There were two types of long-snake formations. A long-snake assault formation, where after the turtle ship deploys a Dangpa strategy, a line of panokseons follows behind it at Sacheon. In 1592, Yi Sun-sin assembled the Joseon fleet in Busan and ordered the fleet in a long-snake formation to sink and damage the Japanese fleet docked there while sailing in a circle for a continuous volley.

The crane-wing formation comprises large warships in the center and the reserve, with flagship ships, lighter ships, and turtle ships on their wings to surround the enemy fleet. During the Battle of Hansando, Yi Sun-Shin dispatched a small detachment forward to lure the Japanese fleet, and they took the bait, following them into open waters off Hansan Island. He ordered his fleet to surround the Japanese fleet with the cran-wing formation and bombarded the Japanese for the whole day.

The piercing formation (chumjajin, Korean: 첨자진) is a formation based on a Hanja character that means "sharp" (尖). It transitions into a crane-wing formation in two lines where it fires in a continuous volley through rank-fire. A line of ships rotates and fires, and then the following line moves up and does the same.

== See also ==
- List of naval battles during the Imjin War
- Wŏn Kyun
- Joseon Army

== Sources ==
- Hawley, Samuel (2005), The Imjin War, The Royal Asiatic Society, Korea Branch/UC Berkeley Press, ISBN 89-954424-2-5
- Stephen Turnbull, "Samurai Invasion - Japan's Korean War 1592-1598", Cassel & Co, 2002
