= Battle of Sacheon (1592) =

1592 Japan–Korea naval battle

- Part of Imjin War
Date	July 8, 1592 (Gregorian Calendar); May 29, 1592 (Lunar Calendar)
Location	Sacheon, Korea 35°00′14″N 128°03′51″E
Result	Korean victory

Belligerents
Japanese Fleet	Joseon

Commanders and leaders
Kurushima Michiyuki	Yi Sun-shin (WIA); Wŏn Kyun

Strength
13 ships	26 total warships: 25 Panokseon; 1 turtle ship

Casualties and losses
All 13 ships destroyed	Lt. Na Dae-yong and Admiral Yi wounded
- Location within South Korea Battle of Sacheon (1592) (Korea)

The Battle of Sacheon was a naval engagement on May 29, 1592 (Gregorian: July 8, 1592) during the Imjin War (1592–98). It occurred at Sacheon where Yi Sunsin's fleet managed to destroy 13 large Japanese ships. It was the first battle of Admiral Yi's 2nd Campaign in the Imjin War, between Japan and Korea, when the turtle ship was first used.

== Prelude ==
Yi Sunsin received news from Wŏn Kyun that the Japanese were already at Sacheon and the surrounding area. Fearing that they were planning an attack on Yeosu, Yi Sunsin set sail with 26 warships on May 29 (Gregorian: July 8). He met up with Wŏn Kyun at Noryang and ordered him to mop up stragglers after the battle and then approached Sacheon.

== Situation at Sacheon ==
Admiral Yi scrutinized the surrounding area. A large cliff overlooked the city and Japanese soldiers seemed to move about everywhere in the city. Twelve very large Japanese warships were anchored in the harbor, along with numerous other smaller ships. Admiral Yi knew that he could not attack the Japanese in a spearhead assault because he knew that the Japanese could direct arquebus fire down on the Koreans from the top of the cliffs.

Admiral Yi wanted to fight the Japanese in the sea where there was more room to maneuver. Hoping to draw the Japanese into open waters, he turned his battleships around and withdrew. Apparently, the Japanese commander had been observing the Korean movements and quickly ordered his captains to take a portion of the fleet anchored at Sacheon and attack the Koreans when he saw them withdraw. Taking the bait, the Japanese pursued the Koreans.

== The turtle ship ==
The Battle of Sacheon was the first battle during which Admiral Yi deployed the turtle ship. By the time the Koreans and the Japanese were out on the open sea, it was nearly dark. Nonetheless, Admiral Yi had the turtle ship and his other vessels turn around quickly and fire upon the Japanese. Admiral Yi had his men unleash a hail of cannonballs and fire arrows. This had an immediate effect on the enemy warships, and the Japanese ships started taking heavy damage.

The fierce and sudden Korean attack shocked the Japanese. But unlike their previous poor performance at the Battle of Okpo, the Japanese soldiers fought bravely and returned fire with their arquebuses in a timely manner. Unfortunately for the Japanese, they did not have a chance to board the Korean ships because of concentrated Korean cannon fire. Also, the turtle ship was impossible to board anyway due to iron spikes on its roof. Then, the Japanese began to panic when the turtle ship smashed into Japanese lines, firing in every direction.

It was in the heat of the battle when Admiral Yi was shot by a Japanese arquebusier. The Korean captains were shocked. However, the bullet only punctured the skin of his left arm leaving Admiral Yi with a very minor injury.

== Aftermath ==
In a couple of hours, every single Japanese warship that had fought was destroyed. Yi Sunsin destroyed all the large Japanese ships and left a few small enemy ships behind hoping to lure back the Japanese who had fled. A few survivors struggled ashore. The Battle of Sacheon caused the Japanese command at Busan some anxiety, as the supply ships that sailed from Japan might be in danger.

== See also ==
- Battle of Okpo
- List of naval battles
- Military history of Korea
- Military history of Japan
- History of Korea

== Bibliography ==
- Alagappa, Muthiah (2003), Asian Security Order: Instrumental and Normative Features, Stanford University Press, ISBN 0-8047-4629-X
- Arano, Yasunori (2005), The Formation of a Japanocentric World Order, International Journal of Asian Studies
- Brown, Delmer M. (May 1948), "The Impact of Firearms on Japanese Warfare, 1543–1598", The Far Eastern Quarterly, 7 (3), Association for Asian Studies: 236–53, doi:10.2307/2048846, JSTOR 2048846, S2CID 162924328
- Eikenberry, Karl W. (1988), "The Imjin War", Military Review, 68 (2): 74–82
- Ha, Tae-hung; Sohn, Pow-key (1977), 'Nanjung Ilgi: War Diary of Admiral Yi Sun-sin, Yonsei University Press, ISBN 89-7141-018-3
- Haboush, JaHyun Kim (2016), The Great East Asian War and the Birth of the Korean Nation
- Hawley, Samuel (2005), The Imjin War, The Royal Asiatic Society, Korea Branch/UC Berkeley Press, ISBN 89-954424-2-5
- Jang, Pyun-soon (1998), Noon-eu-ro Bo-nen Han-gook-yauk-sa 5: Gor-yeo Si-dae (눈으로 보는 한국역사 5: 고려시대), Park Doo-ui, Bae Keum-ram, Yi Sang-mi, Kim Ho-hyun, Kim Pyung-sook, et al., Joog-ang Gyo-yook-yaun-goo-won. 1998-10-30. Seoul, Korea.
- Kim, Ki-chung (Fall 1999), "Resistance, Abduction, and Survival: The Documentary Literature of the Imjin War (1592–8)", Korean Culture, 20 (3): 20–29
- Kim, Yung-sik (1998), "Problems and Possibilities in the Study of the History of Korean Science", Osiris, 2nd Series, 13: 48–79, doi:10.1086/649280, JSTOR 301878, S2CID 143724260
- 桑田忠親 [Kuwata, Tadachika], ed., 舊參謀本部編纂, [Kyu Sanbo Honbu], 朝鮮の役 [Chousen no Eki] (日本の戰史 [Nihon no Senshi] Vol. 5), 1965.
- Neves, Jaime Ramalhete (1994), "The Portuguese in the Im-Jim War?", Review of Culture, 18: 20–24
- Niderost, Eric (June 2001), "Turtleboat Destiny: The Imjin War and Yi Sun Shin", Military Heritage, 2 (6): 50–59, 89
- Niderost, Eric (January 2002), "The Miracle at Myongnyang, 1597", Osprey Military Journal, 4 (1): 44–50
- Park, Yune-hee (1973), Admiral Yi Sun-shin and His Turtleboat Armada: A Comprehensive Account of the Resistance of Korea to the 16th Century Japanese Invasion, Shinsaeng Press
- Rockstein, Edward D. (1993), Strategic And Operational Aspects of Japan's Invasions of Korea 1592–1598 1993-6-18, Naval War College
- Sadler, A. L. (June 1937), "The Naval Campaign in the Korean War of Hideyoshi (1592–1598)", Transactions of the Asiatic Society of Japan, Second Series, 14: 179–208
- Sansom, George (1961), A History of Japan 1334–1615, Stanford University Press, ISBN 0-8047-0525-9
- Sohn, Pow-key (April–June 1959), "Early Korean Painting", Journal of the American Oriental Society, 79 (2): 96–103, doi:10.2307/595851, JSTOR 595851
- Stramigioli, Giuliana (December 1954), "Hideyoshi's Expansionist Policy on the Asiatic Mainland", Transactions of the Asiatic Society of Japan, Third Series, 3: 74–116
- Strauss, Barry (Summer 2005), "Korea's Legendary Admiral", MHQ: The Quarterly Journal of Military History, 17 (4): 52–61
- Swope, Kenneth M. (2006), "Beyond Turtleboats: Siege Accounts from Hideyoshi's Second Invasion of Korea, 1597–1598", Sungkyun Journal of East Asian Studies, 6 (2), Academy of East Asian Studies: 177–206
- Swope, Kenneth M. (2005), "Crouching Tigers, Secret Weapons: Military Technology Employed During the Sino-Japanese-Korean War, 1592–1598", The Journal of Military History, 69: 11–42, doi:10.1353/jmh.2005.0059, S2CID 159829515
- Swope, Kenneth M. (December 2002), "Deceit, Disguise, and Dependence: China, Japan, and the Future of the Tributary System, 1592–1596", The International History Review, 24 (4): 757–1008, doi:10.1080/07075332.2002.9640980, S2CID 154827808
- Swope, Kenneth M. (2009), A Dragon's Head and a Serpent's Tail: Ming China and the First Great East Asian War, 1592–1598, University of Oklahoma Press
- Turnbull, Stephen (2002), Samurai Invasion: Japan's Korean War 1592–98, Cassell & Co, ISBN 0-304-35948-3
- Turnbull, Stephen (2008), The Samurai Invasion of Korea 1592-98, Osprey Publishing Ltd
- Turnbull, Stephen (1998), The Samurai Sourcebook, Cassell & Co, ISBN 1-85409-523-4
- Villiers, John (1980), SILK and Silver: Macau, Manila and Trade in the China Seas in the Sixteenth Century (A lecture delivered to the Hong Kong Branch of the Royal Asiatic Society at the Hong Kong Club. 10 June 1980). The HKUL Digital Initiatives
- Yi, Min-woong (2004), Imjin Wae-ran Haejeonsa: The Naval Battles of the Imjin War [임진왜란 해전사], Chongoram Media [청어람미디어], ISBN 89-89722-49-7
