= 始興 =

始興 may refer to:

- Shixing County, a county in Shaoguan, Guangdong province, China
- Siheung, a city in Gyeonggi Province, South Korea
- Siheung County, a former county in Gyeonggi Province, South Korea
- Siheung-dong, a neighbourhood of Seoul, South Korea
- Liu Jun, Prince Shixing (429–453), a prince of the Chinese Liu Song dynasty

== See also ==
- Siheung (disambiguation)
- Shixing (disambiguation)
