= Sorae Salt Pond =

Former salt pan in South Korea

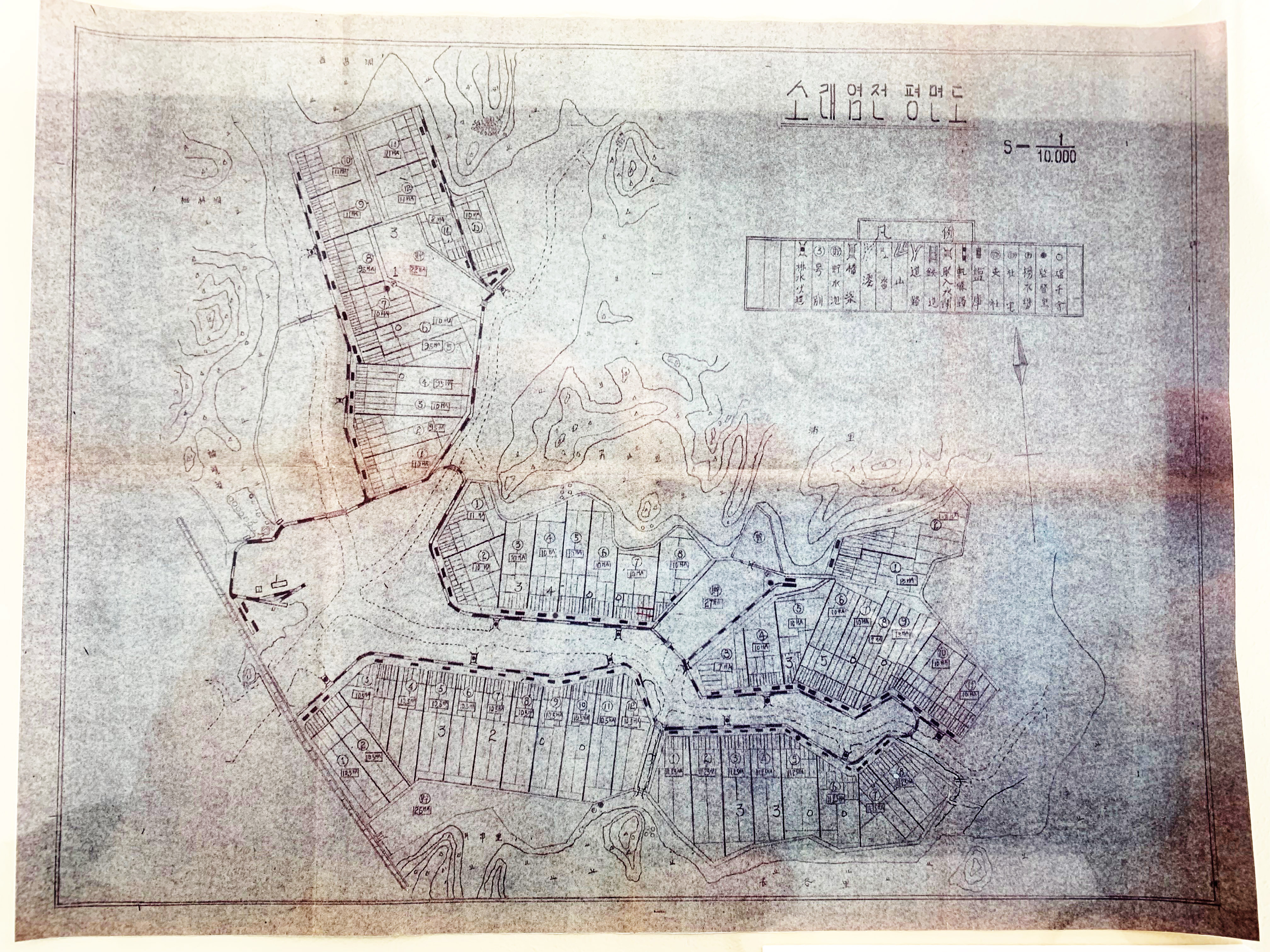
Floor plan of the Sorae Salt Field kept at the Sorae History Museum

Sorae Salt Pond (Korean: 소래염전) is a former salt pan located across Nonhyeon-dong in Namdong District, Incheon, and Bangsan-dong, Po-dong, Wolgot-dong, and Janggok-dong in Siheung, Gyeonggi Province, South Korea. Built as part of the fourth-phase salt pan construction initiated by the Governor-General of Chōsen, its construction spanned from 1935 to 1937. Following the liberation of Korea, it remained a major source of solar salt production under the South Korean government. However, facing a structural decline in the domestic salt industry and losing economic viability, the facility was permanently closed in July 1996.

Like most traditional solar evaporation facilities, the Sorae Salt Pond produced salt by channeling seawater sequentially through a primary reservoir, two evaporation ponds, and a final crystallization pond. The workforce was organized into five distinct operational zones, each tasked with managing a specific section of the salt field. Over its decades of operation, the facility underwent several technical modernizations; the original mud floors of the crystallization ponds were gradually paved with tiles, and the method of moving harvested salt transitioned from manual shoulder-carrying to the use of handcarts. Today, portions of the site within Incheon and Siheung have been restored as a public ecological park. The remaining land is held by Sungdam, a private corporation that succeeded the Daehan Salt Era Corporation (the privatized salt division of the former Office of Monopoly). Physical remnants of the colonial-era salt industry, including wooden salt warehouses and narrow-gauge trackbeds once used by salt transport cars (locally known as gasirang trains), are still preserved on-site.

Following the launch of the Sorae Wetland Ecological Park project, local authorities restored the surrounding mudflats, tidal channels, and the abandoned 1,561,000 m² salt pan area into a biological sanctuary and a habitat for migratory birds. The park construction was completed in May 2009, when it officially opened to the public.

== Background ==
Until the late Joseon dynasty, salt production on the Korean Peninsula relied almost entirely on jayeom (boiled salt). This labor-intensive method involved repeatedly plowing and drying mudflats during low tide to concentrate salinity within the soil, filtering seawater through this enriched mud to collect highly saline brine (함수; hamsu), and then boiling the brine in large cauldrons to crystallize the salt. During this era, salt-making kilns operated across the western, southern, and eastern coastlines of Korea. Jeollanam-do yielded approximately 50% of national production. Within Gyeonggi Province(Joseon), the largest output came from Namyang County, though Ansan County, Suwon County, Tongjin County, Bupyeong County, and Incheon were also prominent salt-producing centers. The specific outputs within the modern boundaries of Incheon during the late empire were documented as follows; however, this regional production represented only about 2.3% of the total output of the peninsula, meaning its distribution was limited to local consumption and neighboring markets in Seoul and Gyeonggi.

Jayeom Production in the Incheon Area (1907)
District	Salt Kilns	Salt Pan Area (Jeonbo)	Production Output (Geun)
Mowolgot-myeon, Bupyeong County	44	21 jeonbo 719 bo	2,011,260
Seokgot-myeon, Bupyeong County	23	6 jeonbo 9,115 bo	664,226
Juan-myeon, Incheon County	10	2 jeonbo 5,228 bo	347,700
Seo-myeon, Incheon County	4	2 jeonbo 3,317 bo	232,560
Bunae-myeon, Incheon County	5	3 jeonbo 2,028 bo	318,240
Namchon-myeon, Incheon County	24	19 jeonbo 717 bo	1,970,620
Jodong-myeon, Incheon County	9	6 jeonbo 9,320 bo	660,960
Shinhyeon-myeon, Incheon County	2	5 jeonbo 825 bo	61,200
Total	121	74 jeonbo 1,269 bo	6,266,766

Following the opening of Korean ports under the Treaty of Ganghwa, the expansion of foreign trade catalyzed a commodity-money economy, while urban population growth led to an increased demand for salt used in preserving kimchi and seafood. Concurrently, an influx of inexpensive, mass-produced solar salt from Japan and Qing dynasty China crippled Korea's small-scale, self-sufficient traditional producers, shifting the domestic trade toward larger commercial brokers. In response, the Ministry of Agriculture, Commerce, and Industry of the Korean Empire established a 20-jeonbo experimental station in Juan-dong, Incheon, in 1899. Under the direction of technician Byeon Guk-seon (卞國璇), (Note: Byeon Guk-seon was the father of the modern artist and writer Byon Dong-rim.) the facility successfully harvested its first crop of domestic solar salt the following year. This site aimed to modernize Korean salt manufacturing by introducing iron boiling pans and Western apparatuses. The station utilized coal as fuel and employed advanced monitoring instruments, such as barometers, Celsius thermometers, soil thermometers, and wind-powered electrical indicators to maximize thermal efficiency. Records of production at this specific experimental facility cease after August 30, 1901. Although its precise coordinates are unverified, historians assume that the later, larger industrial Juan Salt Pan was constructed directly over this experimental ground.

Unlike the solar salt imported from China, domestic salt production in mainland Japan relied primarily on the boiling method, rendering Japanese producers incapable of matching the low market prices of Chinese imports. The Japanese colonial apparatus concluded that establishing solar evaporation fields within Korea—where the climate, flat coastal mudflats, and low land costs were far more favorable than on the Japanese archipelago—would secure a stable supply of industrial raw materials for Japan's domestic chemical and military sectors. This strategy also aimed to monopolize the Korean domestic market by supplanting imported Chinese salt with high-quality, state-controlled colonial solar salt. To test the large-scale feasibility of solar evaporation on the peninsula, the Residency-Genera surveyed potential sites, initially prioritizing the tidal areas between Dalido Island and the Hwawon Peninsula near Mokpo. However, the central government of the Korean Empire adamantly opposed installing solar facilities in the Mokpo region, which was the heartland of traditional Korean jayeom guilds. After briefly considering Myeongjido Island in Busan as an alternative, authorities ultimately selected Juan in Incheon due to its immediate proximity to the capital, Hanseong (modern-day Seoul).

According to the Historical Records of the Korean Salt Industry (조선염업사료) compiled by salt technician Takayoshi Ishikawa (石川武吉), field engineers Naojiro Yamada (山田直次郞) and Kiyoshiro Miki (三木毛吉郞) of the Monopoly Bureau of the Government-General of Taiwan conducted extensive tideland surveys along the Korean coast in 1906, identifying Juan as the ideal site. In September 1907, a 1-jeonbo Taiwan-style solar salt pan was completed. On September 23, prominent cabinet ministers—including Song Byeong-jun, Ye Wanyong, Im Seon-jun, and Ko Yeong-hui, who were later reviled as members of the Seven Traitors of Jeongmi—traveled via the Gyeongin Line to inspect the new solar facility. The solar salt harvested at Juan proved far superior in both chemical purity and cost-efficiency compared to the salt produced at the Japanese-style thermal boiling facility in Yongho-ri, Dongrae County, Gyeongsangnam-do. Both experimental stations were officially dissolved in February 1909 as operations shifted toward full-scale commercial production.

== Construction and operation ==
Based on the data gathered from these experimental stations, the Residency-General and the subsequent Government-General of Chōsen executed a four-phase master plan to build state-run solar salt pans across the Korean Peninsula. Within the modern limits of Incheon, the Juan Salt Pan was established during the first and second phases by reclaiming Juan-gaetgol. Once the bay was fully occupied, the Namdong Salt Pan was built during the third phase by reclaiming the estuary of the Seunggi Stream. Following the third phase, the Japanese government suspended infrastructure projects due to the economic fallout of the 1923 Great Kantō earthquake; the fourth phase did not commence until 1933. To minimize embankment construction costs and protect the facilities from storm surges or typhoons, the fourth-phase salt pans were built at a higher elevation than the natural sea level—unlike previous phases where fields sat lower than high-tide markers. Consequently, the Sorae facility relied heavily on mechanical pumping to lift seawater into its reservoirs.

Government-General State-Run Salt Pan Construction (Phases 1–2)
Phase	Region	Section	Area (Jeonbo)	Completion Date
Phase 1 (1909–14)	Juan, Bucheon, Gyeonggi	Section 1	1.1	August 1907
Phase 1 (1909–14)	Juan, Bucheon, Gyeonggi	Section 2	6.6	May 1909
Phase 1 (1909–14)	Juan, Bucheon, Gyeonggi	Section 3	9.0	June 1909
Phase 1 (1909–14)	Juan, Bucheon, Gyeonggi	Section 4	14.5	May 1910
Phase 1 (1909–14)	Juan, Bucheon, Gyeonggi	Section 5	57.3	July 1911
Phase 1 (1909–14)	Subtotal		88.5	
Phase 2 (1918–20)	Juan, Bucheon, Gyeonggi	Section 6	32.4	March 1919
Phase 2 (1918–20)	Juan, Bucheon, Gyeonggi	Section 7	46.9	March 1919
Phase 2 (1918–20)	Juan, Bucheon, Gyeonggi	Section 8	44.6	March 1919
Phase 2 (1918–20)	Subtotal		123.9	

Government-General State-Run Salt Pan Construction (Phases 3–4)
Phase	Region	Section	Area (Jeonbo)	Completion Date	
Phase 3 (1920–26)	Namdong, Bucheon, Gyeonggi	Section 1–3	300.0	May 1921	
Phase 3 (1920–26)	Namdong, Bucheon, Gyeonggi	Subtotal	300.0		
Phase 3 (1920–26)	Namdong, Bucheon, Gyeonggi	Gunja, Siheung, Gyeonggi	Section 1–3	575.0	March 1925
Phase 3 (1920–26)	Subtotal	Gunja, Siheung, Gyeonggi	575.0		
Phase 3 (1920–26)	Phase 4 (1933–40)	Sorae, Bucheon/Siheung, Gyeonggi	Section 1–3	549.0	June 1937
Phase 3 (1920–26)	Phase 4 (1933–40)	Sorae, Bucheon/Siheung, Gyeonggi	Subtotal	549.0	

The geographic location of the Sorae Salt Pond was highly advantageous for industrial salt manufacturing. The surrounding intertidal zone was vast and flat, and the soil composition consisted of a balanced, half-and-half mixture of clay and sand, which was ideal for maintaining structural integrity and preventing brine from leaching back into the earth during evaporation. A substantial tidal range of 10.86 meters provided a continuous supply of seawater, and because only minor freshwater streams emptied into the local bay, the coastal salinity remained consistently high. Furthermore, logistics were efficient; harvested salt could be loaded directly onto the Suin Line narrow-gauge railway and transported straight to the Port of Incheon, allowing rapid distribution to the high-demand Seoul Capital Area and export markets in Japan and Manchukuo.

The initial construction of the Sorae Salt Pond required a capital layout of 584,500 won in 1934 currency. Ground was broken on May 26, 1934. Oral history from local residents indicates that the Government-General relied heavily on Chinese migrant laborers for the heavy earthworks and dyke-building. Many of these specialized workers had originally migrated from Shandong Province to construct the Gwangryangman Salt Pans in South Pyeongan Province, and were later deployed south as new fields were opened across Bucheon and Siheung counties.

The four major state-run salt pans in the Gyeonggi region—Juan, Namdong, Gunja, and Sorae—were managed under the centralized jurisdiction of the Juan Branch Office of the Monopoly Bureau. This branch office operated field stations at Namdong, Gunja, and Sorae to directly supervise daily operations, while the main office directly managed the Juan site. The administrative structure was divided into three departments: General Affairs (accounting, storage, transport, and welfare), Operations (labor recruitment, production supervision, and facility repairs), and Civil Engineering (surveying, infrastructure design, and dyke/warehouse maintenance). In 1943, the state-run Sorae field station was temporarily dissolved when the facility was leased to the private Chosun Salt Manufacturing Corporation to maximize wartime output.

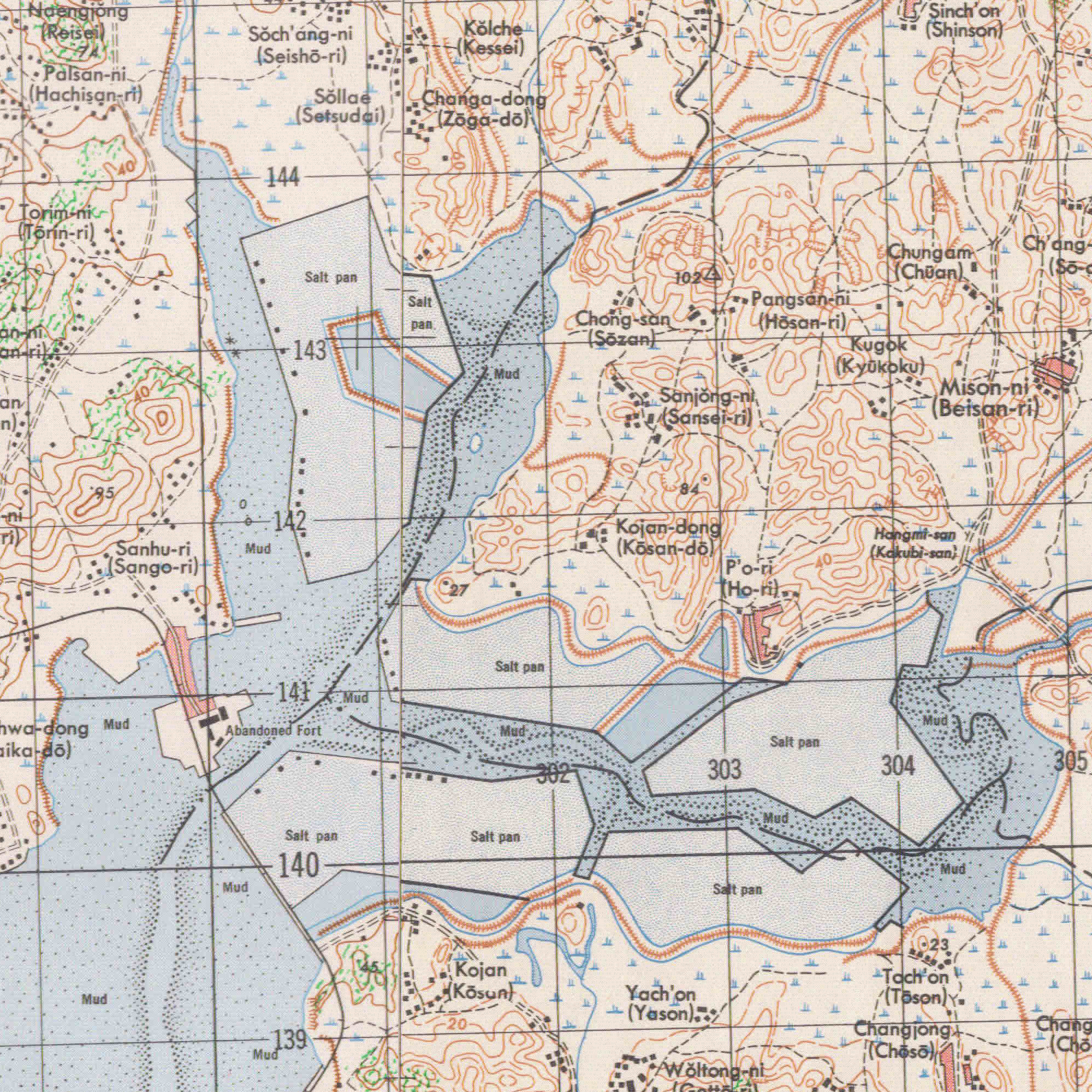
A 1946 map detailing the location of the Sorae Salt Pond

Following the liberation and the subsequent division of Korea, the salt fields of Juan, Namdong, Gunja, and Sorae constituted nearly the entire industrial solar salt infrastructure remaining south of the 38th parallel, with a combined output of roughly 100,000 tons per year. (Note: The salt pans of Shinan County, Jeollanam-do, which are currently the center of South Korea's solar salt industry, were established later, beginning with the construction of the Daedong Salt Pan on Bigeumdo Island around 1948.) To combat a severe post-war domestic salt deficit, the South Korean government initially imported 100,000 to 150,000 tons annually, while launching a Five-Year Salt Production Expansion Plan that licensed private entities to reclaim tidal flats along the western and southern coastlines.

By 1955, South Korea achieved net self-sufficiency in salt, with national capacity climbing to 700,000 tons. However, because annual domestic consumption hovered around only 300,000 tons, the country faced chronic overproduction by 1957, straining the finances of the Office of Monopoly, which was legally bound to buy up excess yields. Consequently, the government founded the Korea Salt Corporation on October 7, 1961, to streamline marketing, followed by the Provisional Salt Management Act on January 1, 1962, which officially abolished the state monopoly on salt production. In October 1963, assets were transferred from the Office of Monopoly to a public enterprise, the Daehan Salt Era Corporation. This body was fully privatized on July 4, 1971, and was later renamed Sungdam on February 29, 1992.

Even after privatization, the Sorae site maintained a massive output. In 1965, the three major fields along Gyeonggi Bay—Namdong, Gunja, and Sorae—accounted for the highest regional volume of solar salt in South Korea. Through the 1970s, Sorae alone supplied nearly 30% of the nation's domestic table salt. In 1981, out of approximately 811,000 tons produced nationwide, the Gyeonggi Bay facilities yielded 61,769 tons, with Sorae contributing 20,570 tons. However, as labor costs rose and global salt prices plunged due to an influx of low-cost industrial salt imported from China, domestic solar salterns became economically unviable. The Sorae Salt Pond officially ceased all operations and closed permanently on July 31, 1996.

== Salt production process ==
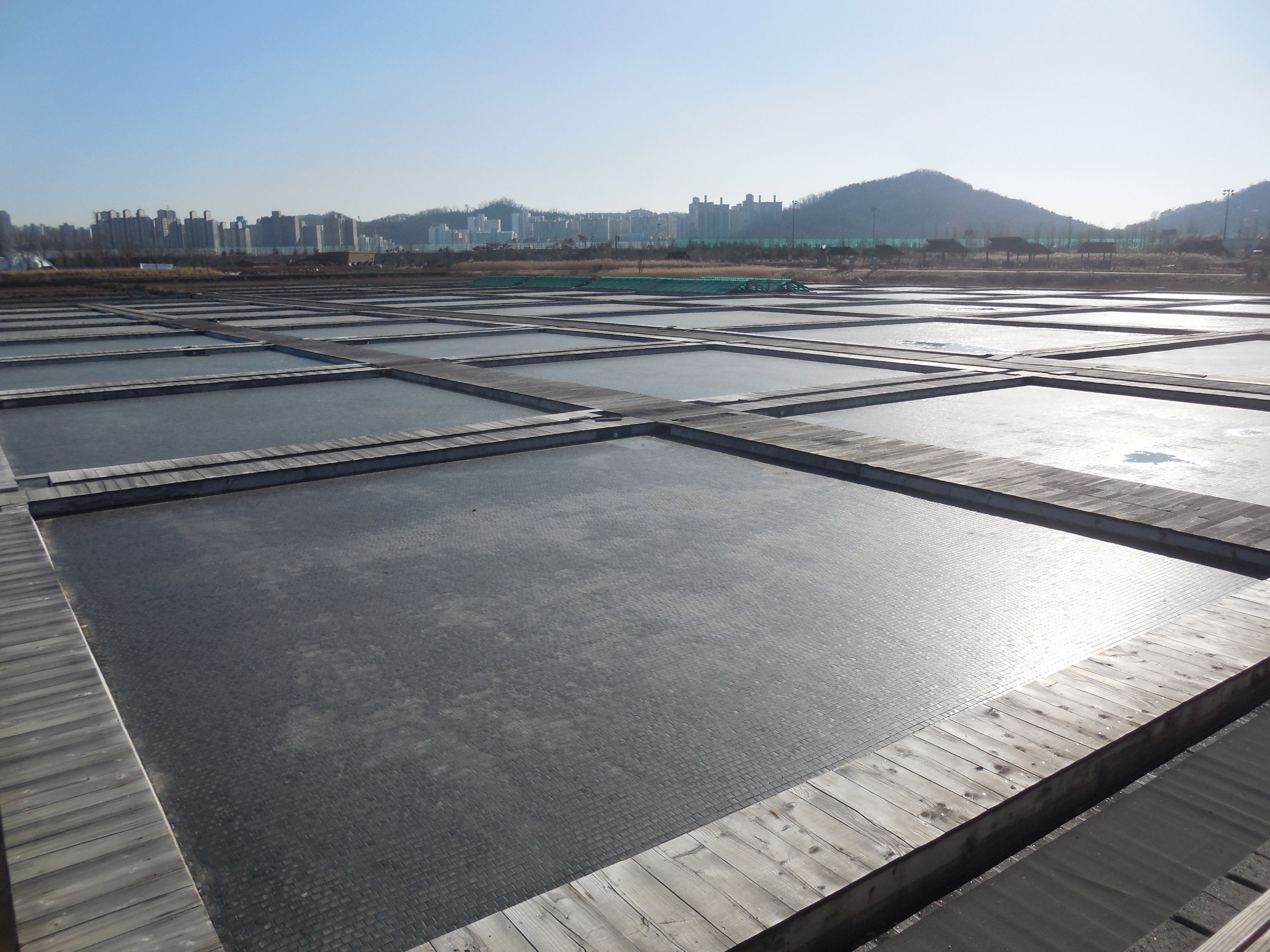
A restored crystallizing pond featuring a tiled floor

Solar salt production at the facility was organized into three functional zones: the primary reservoir, the evaporation ponds, and the crystallization ponds. The primary evaporation stage consisted of six tiered levels, while the secondary evaporation stage contained four, utilizing slight step-downs between each tier to allow brine to flow naturally by force of gravity. The cycle began by drawing raw seawater into the reservoir during high tide, at which stage the water's salinity measured between 2.5 and 3 degrees on the Baumé scale. Because Sorae was constructed under the fourth-phase engineering profile, the highest tier of its evaporation ponds sat above the high-tide reservoir line. Consequently, mechanical water pumps were required to elevate the seawater from the reservoir into the initial evaporation tier.

As the sun and wind evaporated moisture, the salinity concentrated gradually as the brine trickled through the primary and secondary ponds. Within the secondary evaporation zone, deep pits called hamsuyu (함수류; brine storage pits) (Note: It is also referred to as a gansu-gudeongi (literally "brine pit") or haeju (literally "brine reservoir").) were built at each level to shelter highly concentrated brine from rain or sudden temperature drops during the winter months. The brine from these pits was traditionally scooped back into the evaporation beds using manual wooden waterwheels, though motorized pumps were introduced in 1984 to work alongside the traditional wheels.

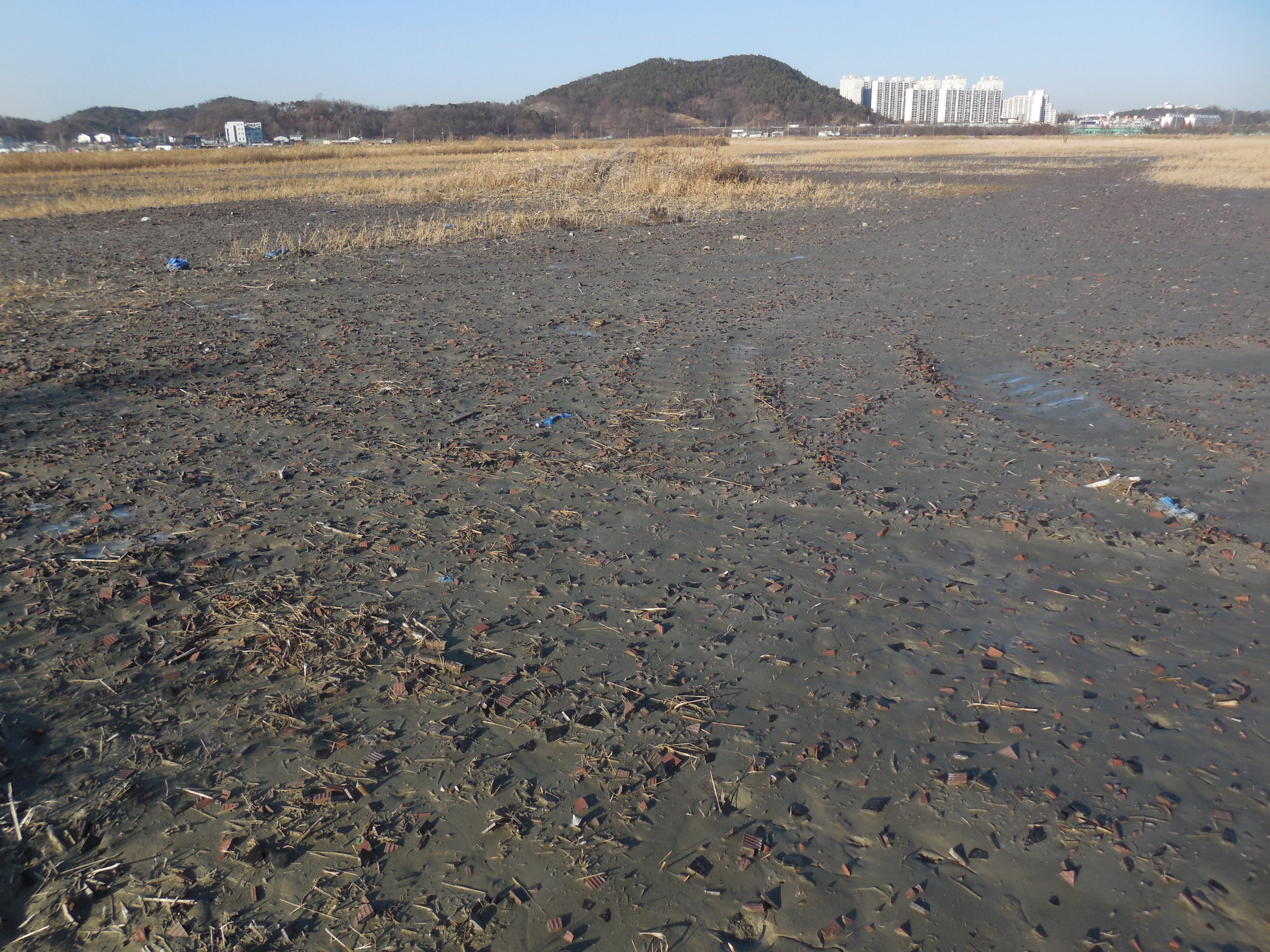
Remnants of tiles previously paved on the floor of a crystallizing pond

Upon entering the final crystallization pond, the brine reached a density of 15 to 16 Baumé. Once further solar evaporation pushed the salinity to 25 degrees, sodium chloride crystals began precipitating on the floor, where laborers harvested them using heavy wooden scrapers called gogurae. During the early colonial era, the floors of the crystallization ponds consisted of packed, bare clay mud (known as topan). Later, about 20% of the fields were paved with gaempari (broken shards of traditional earthenware pottery) to ease harvesting and prevent mud contamination. Beginning in 1983, standard ceramic tiles were introduced, and both gaempari and tiled beds were used concurrently until the site's closure. The harvested salt was stored in wooden warehouses distributed at a ratio of one warehouse per 5 jeonbo. While workers initially transported the heavy salt using shoulder yokes (mokdochae), they transitioned to manual handcarts in later years. The salt was then moved to large shipping depots near Sorae Station via the gasirang narrow-gauge railway tracks.

Under the Japanese colonial administration, roles within the facility were strictly stratified into Japanese field supervisors, Korean chief saltern masters (yeombujang), foremen (banjang), and general laborers (divided into permanent and seasonal staff). The supervisors, who reported directly to the Juan Branch Office, were assigned at a ratio of one officer per 100 to 200 jeonbo. Chief saltern masters were stationed at a ratio of one per 20 jeonbo to oversee technical details and manage the daily labor output. Permanent laborers formed the bulk of the workforce; according to 1942 statistics, permanent saltern workers at Sorae logged a combined 68,266 man-days at a daily wage of 0.995 yen, while temporary seasonal workers logged 23,951 man-days at 0.900 yen. Foremen received additional stipends, including extra rations of rice, cotton textiles, footwear, and cigarettes.

Daily Saltern Workers per 10 Jeonbo at the Juan Branch Office Salt Pans (1942)
Worker Status	System	Mar	Apr	May	Jun	Jul (Early)	Jul (Late)	Aug	Sep	Oct	Nov	Dec	Jan	Feb
Permanent	Flow-down	6	6	6	6	6	6	6	6	6	6	6	6	6
Permanent	Pumping	7	7	7	7	7	7	7	7	7	7	7	7	7
Temporary	Both	3	3	3	3	3	2	2	1	0	0	0	0	0
Total	Flow-down	9	9	9	9	9	8	8	7	6	6	6	6	6
Total	Pumping	10	10	10	10	10	9	9	8	7	7	7	7	7

Following the 1945 liberation, this organizational hierarchy persisted with minor modifications. Workers divided the Sorae fields into five distinct geographical zones: Zone 100 (Baek-gu) facing Nonhyeon-dong, Zone 200 (Ibaek-gu) facing Wolgot-dong, Zone 300 (Sambaek-gu) facing Janggok-dong, Zone 400 (Sabaek-gu) facing Bangsan-dong, and Zone 500 (Obaek-gu) facing Po-dong, each led by an overseer. Under each overseer, a chief saltern master managed a 20-jeonbo sector, commanding several foremen. It typically required a decade of physical labor to be promoted to a foreman position. Each foreman was responsible for 10 jeonbo and was assisted by two vice-foremen, with the trio effectively splitting the terrain to manage 5 jeonbo each.

Stationed beneath them were brine tenders, known locally as nanchippatu, (Note: The term nanchi refers to the primary evaporation pond, while patu (扒土; bātǔ) is derived from the Chinese phrase meaning "to rake or shovel earth.") who monitored brine channels and regulated density. The base workforce comprised unassigned assistants (bojosu) and temporary day-laborers (jageopsu) hired during peak summer harvests. While saltern labor was traditionally exclusively male, severe labor shortages in the 1980s led to the widespread hiring of female workers. Wages dropped significantly in relative terms following privatization; by the 1990s, monthly salaries were distributed at approximately 1 million won for overseers, 800,000 won for chief masters, 700,000 won for foremen, and 600,000 won for lower-tier tenders, while temporary hands were paid by the day. Because these earnings fell below the contemporary industrial average, some laborers supplemented their income by smuggling out small amounts of salt at night, and practiced extreme financial frugality during winter when all production ceased.

Every October, at the conclusion of the annual salt-harvesting season, the Monopoly Bureau sponsored a Salt Field Festival (Yeombanjeon-je) and a Saltern Workers' Appreciation Banquet (Yeombu-wiando-hoe) to placate laborers. At the central Juan office, formal rites were conducted at a temporary Shinto shrine erected near the dikes, followed by full-day athletic competitions and feasts. The festival at the Sorae fields was held sequentially right after the conclusion of the Juan events. This annual tradition continued under the name "Salt Festival" until 1997. The municipality of Siheung later revived the historical event, staging the "Siheung Salt Pan Salt Festival" at the Siheung Gaetgol Ecological Park on May 12, 2019.

== Post-closure status ==
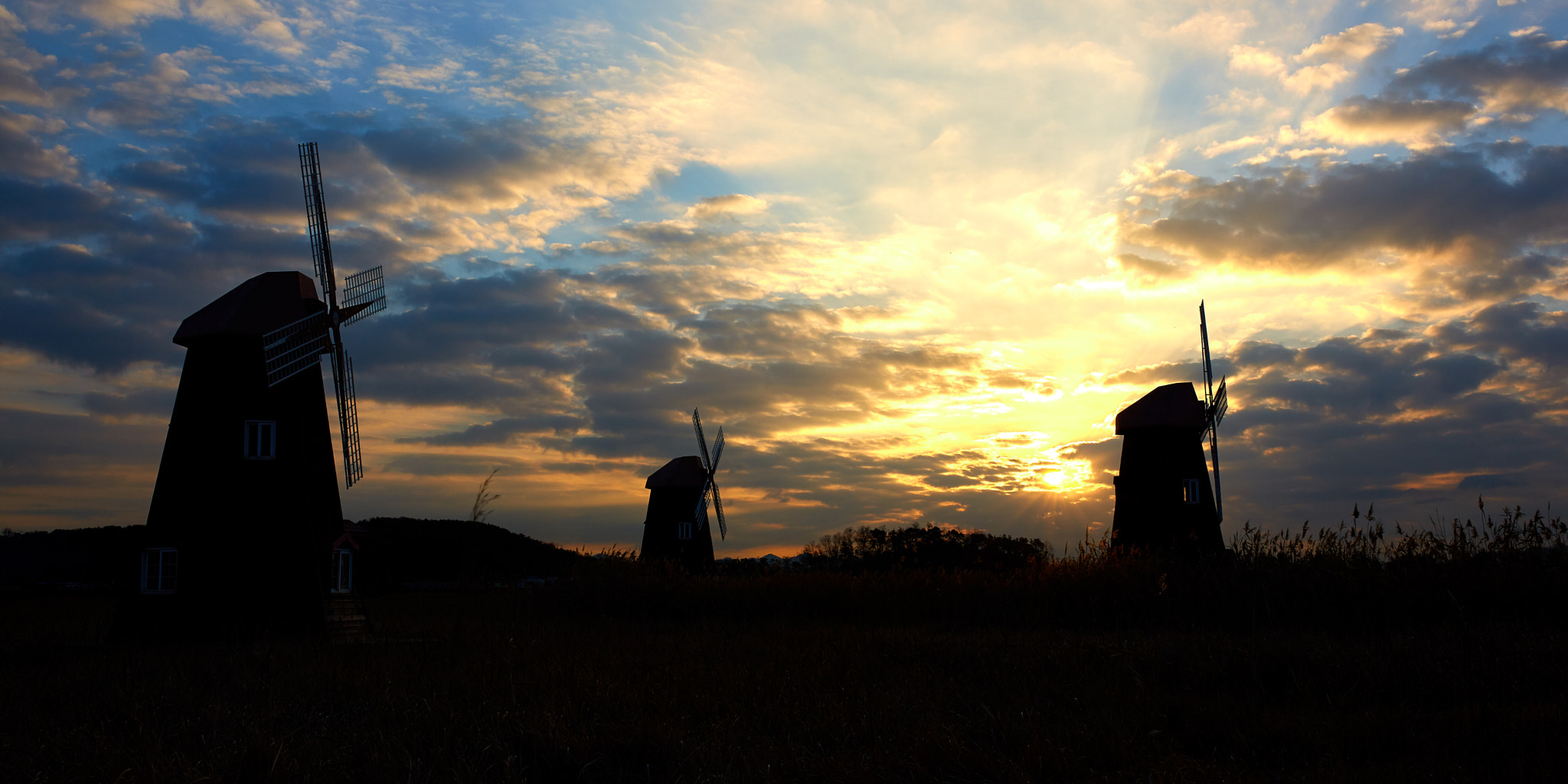
Sunrise over the Sorae Wetland Ecological Park

Following its closure, the abandoned site of the Sorae Salt Pond followed multiple trajectories: portions were transformed into conservation areas and ecological parks, adjacent tracts were repurposed for urban and real estate development, while the remaining sections continue to sit vacant.

On June 1, 1999, the Incheon Metropolitan Government opened the Sorae Wetland Ecological Park, utilizing the former salt pan land situated in Nonhyeon-dong, Namdong District. An on-site ecological exhibition hall subsequently opened within the park on July 18, 2008. Following several phases of structural expansion over a decade, the park fully opened to the general public on July 17, 2009, covering a total area of 1,561,000 m².

Concurrently, the neighboring city of Siheung developed and operated the Siheung Gaetgol Ecological Park around Janggok-dong starting in the early 2000s, launching an annual tidal channel (gaetgol) festival at the venue in 2006. The emblem and official mascot characters for the Siheung Gaetgol Ecological Park were publicly unveiled in May 2008, and extensive park expansion infrastructure commenced in May 2009, reaching full completion in 2014. The unique inland mudflats winding through the Siheung Gaetgol Ecological Park were designated as a federally protected wetland conservation area by the national government on February 17, 2012.

Ownership of the remaining undeveloped portions of the Sorae Salt Pond is still retained by private corporate entity Sungdam. In 2004, Sungdam pursued a development project to construct a commercial golf course on the land parcels immediately north of the Sorae Wetland Ecological Park. After that initial attempt was blocked, the corporation shifted focus in 2006, drafting alternative plans to establish a golf course on parcels directly south of the Siheung Gaetgol Ecological Park instead. Despite sustained pushback and demonstrations from regional environmental civic organizations citing severe ecological degradation, the private development went forward, and the Salt Bay Golf Club officially opened for business on February 10, 2014.

=== Salt warehouses ===
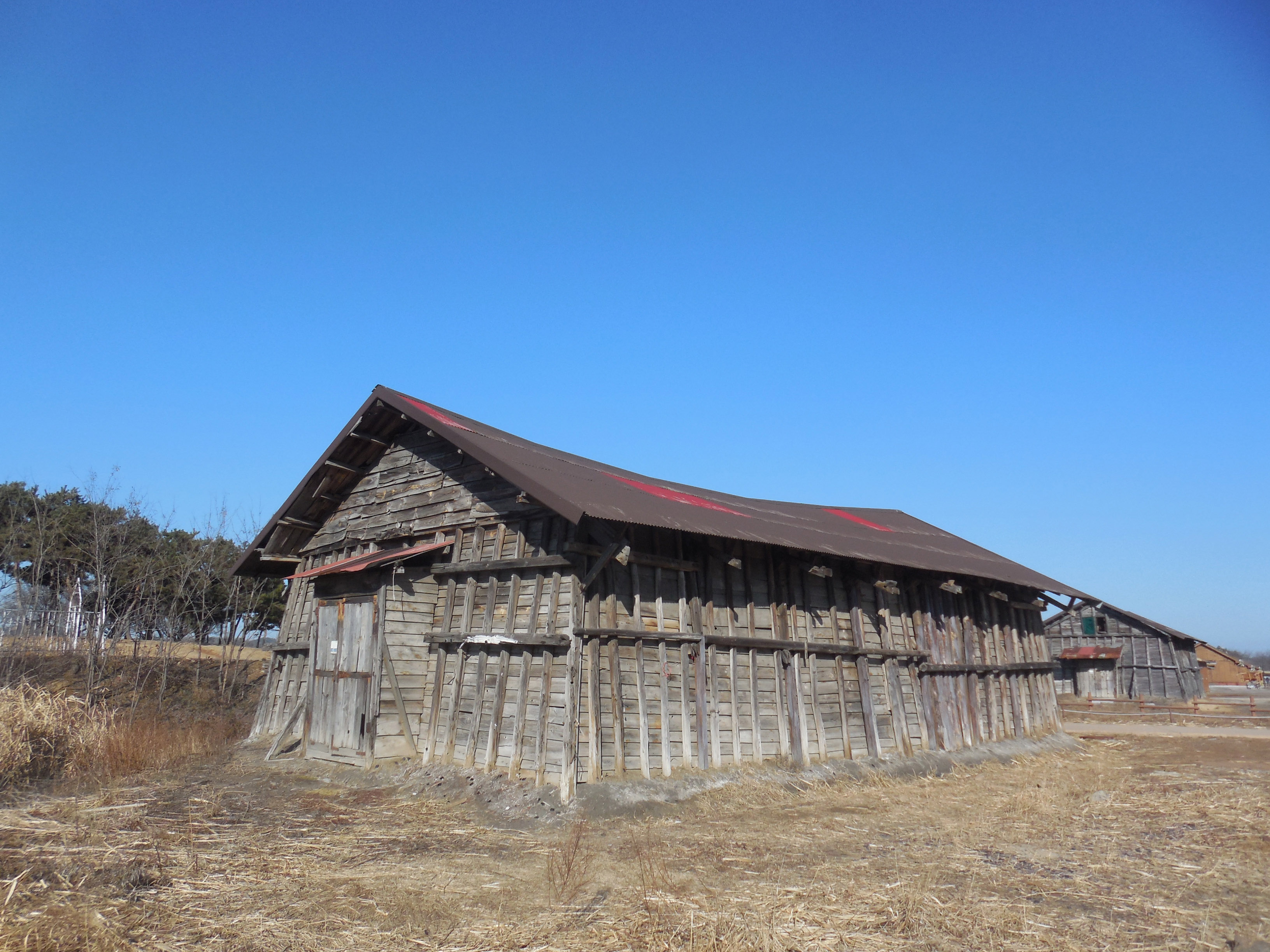
One of the two surviving salt warehouses within the Siheung Gaetgol Ecological Park

Several historical wooden structures used for bulk salt storage remain standing across both the Incheon and Siheung municipal territories. On the Incheon side, a local nature learning facility operates inside the Sorae Wetland Ecological Park within a renovated historical salt warehouse. As of 2020, two original salt warehouses built in the 1930s survive on-site in their original form, alongside two scaled-down replica structures constructed using salvaged timber from dismantled original warehouses, and one completely new replica structure.

On the Siheung side, a total of 40 historical salt warehouses stood in rows flanking both sides of the tidal channel as late as May 2006, consisting of 26 heavily damaged structures, 12 partially damaged structures, and 2 well-preserved buildings. These structures had all been erected between 1934 and 1937. The Cultural Heritage Administration (CHA) noted that the site held immense industrial value to represent pre-liberation Korean solar salt manufacturing, replacing the now-demolished Namdong and Gunja facilities. The CHA officially recommended prioritizing the urgent registration of the salt warehouses and their surrounding landscape within the Siheung Gaetgol Ecological Park as a National Registered Cultural Heritage, with the remaining outlying facilities and tidal channels to be appended later.

However, on June 4, 2007—just three days before the CHA's scheduled official review meeting to designate the site—Sungdam abruptly demolished 38 of the 40 remaining salt warehouses using heavy machinery. While the company publicly stated that the historic structures were razed due to concerns over structural collapse and potential transitions into high-crime blind spots, civic groups strongly asserted that the sudden demolition was a pre-emptive measure designed to prevent state conservation regulations from interfering with Sungdam's ongoing commercial golf course development project (the current Salt Bay Golf Club).

=== Gasireong train ===
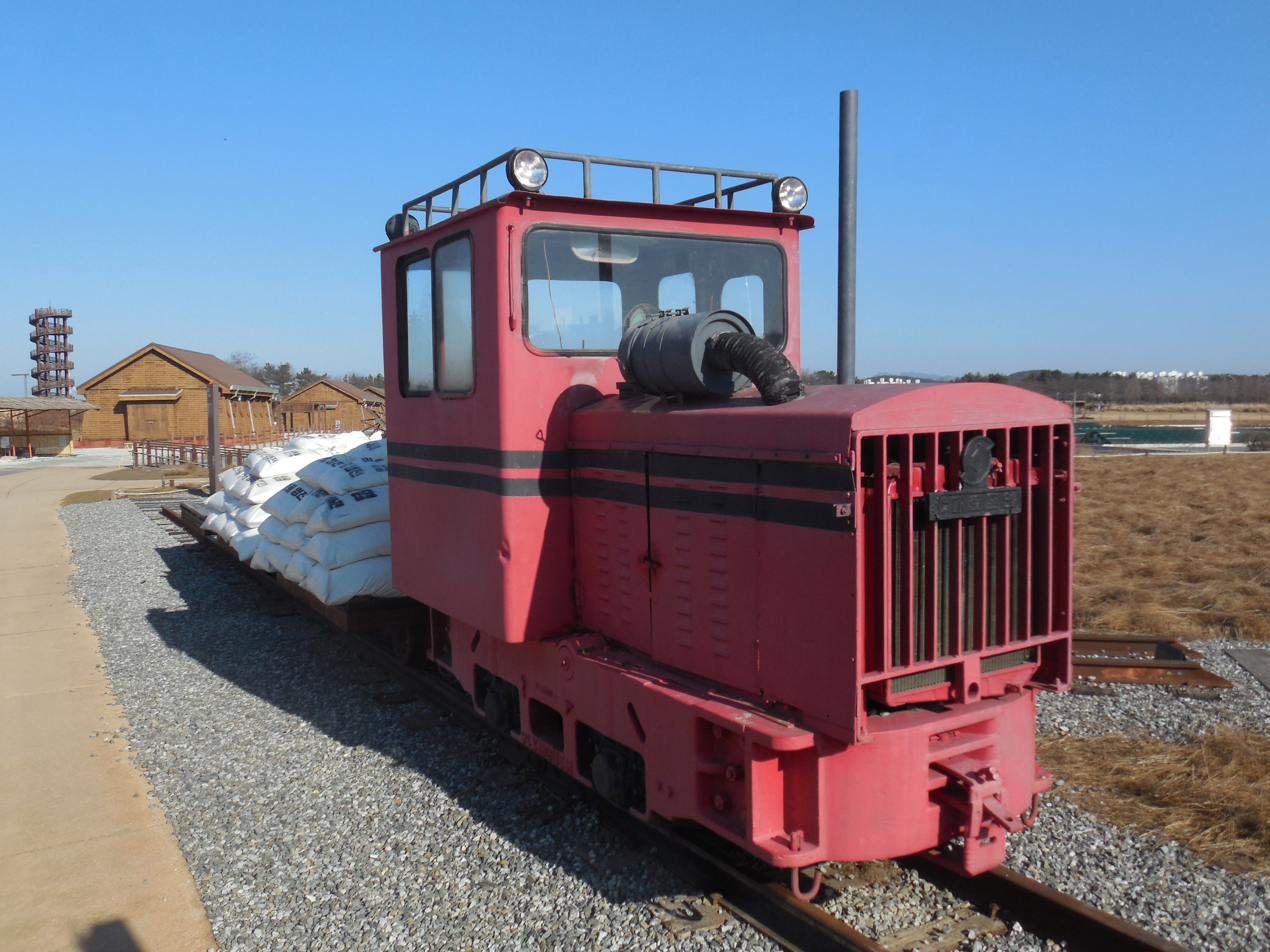
The Gasireong train on display at the Siheung Gaetgol Ecological Park

At Sorae Station on the narrow-gauge Suin Line, there was a dedicated industrial siding known as the "Salt Industry Line" (Yeomop-seon). Originally operated as the "Monopoly Line" (Jeonmae-seon), it was formally renamed the Salt Industry Line on August 20, 1964. On this track, a small gasoline-powered locomotive nicknamed the Gasireong-cha habitually pulled around twenty freight cars loaded with solar salt at a time.

The last remaining Gasireong locomotive was initially stored inside an industrial depot located at 67-5 Po-dong, Siheung-si, following the closure of the Sorae Salt Field. From 2014 to 2019, it was kept on display at the Salt Bay Golf Club, developed by Sungdam Co., Ltd. on the former saltern site. Since September 19, 2019, it has been moved to a public display pavilion at the Siheung Gaetgol Ecological Park. The name Gasireong-cha is presumed by linguists to be a local phonetic corruption of the standard loanword Gasoring-cha (gasoline car). The Gasireong train crossed the tidal channel between Sorae Station and the Sorae Salt Field via a bridge named Soyeomgyo. This bridge collapsed into the mudflats following the closure of the salt field and was rebuilt as a concrete pedestrian bridge by authorities in 2006.

== In popular culture ==
The scenic expanses of the Sorae Salt Pond have historically been a favored location for landscape and fine-art photography. During its peak years of commercial operation, the manual labor of the saltern workers and the long rows of dark wooden warehouses sitting against the tidal horizon were iconic subjects for regional photographers. Following the termination of industrial activity, the abandoned salt beds continue to be utilized as a backdrop for cinematic wedding and commercial photography. The native halophyte salt marshes and sinuous inland tidal channels, flanked by the surviving wooden ruins, remain a focal point for nature photography. At the Sorae Wetland Ecological Park, the distinct visual profile of several imported windmills set against expansive reed beds draws considerable weekend tourist traffic.

The salt field has also inspired various modern Korean literary works. The poet Lee Ga-rim, an Incheon resident since 1982, lamented the loss of the site's raw industrial heritage and its commercial transformation into a sanitized tourist destination in his poem Scenery with a Salt Warehouse (소금창고가 있는 풍경). The sijo poet Lee Gwang-nyeong, an Incheon native, composed the verse My Father and the Sorae Salt Field (아버지와 소래염전) to document generational memories of saltern labor; a dedicated granite poetry monument was erected within the Sorae Wetland Ecological Park in July 2017 to commemorate the work. Additionally, the commercial feature films Under the Sky Without Mother (어머니 없는 하늘 아래, 1977) and the cinematic adaptation of Cho Se-hui's landmark social novel A Dwarf Launches a Little Ball (난장이가 쏘아올린 작은 공, 1981) utilized the industrial Sorae Salt Pond as an active shooting location prior to its closure.

== Notes ==
Explanatory notes

Citations
