= Siheung (disambiguation) =

- Siheung County (Siheung-gun, 시흥군; 1895–1989), a former county in Gyeonggi Province
- Siheung City (Siheung-si, 시흥시; 1989–), a city in Gyeonggi Province
- Siheung-dong (시흥동), is a dong in Geumcheon District, Seoul
- Siheung-dong, Seongnam is a dong in Sujeong District, Seongnam, Gyeonggi Province

== See also ==
- 始興, disambiguation page for related titles
- Shixing (disambiguation)
