= Yi Sun-sin (disambiguation) =

- Hangul: 이순신
- RR: I Sunsin
- MR: I Sunsin
- IPA: /i.sʰun.ɕʰin/

Yi Sun-sin or Lee Soon-shin may also refer to:

- Yi Sun-sin (1545–1598), also known as Chungmugong, a Korean commander
  - ROKS Chungmugong Yi Sun-sin (DDH-975), a Chungmugong Yi Sun-sin-class destroyer
- Yi Sun-sin (born 1554) (1554–1611), also known as Muuigong, a Korean commander
  - ROKS Yi Sun-sin (SS-068), a Chang Bogo-class submarine
- Yi Soon Shin (comic), a historical fiction fantasy graphic novel comic book
- Lee Soon-shin, a character in South Korean television series Lovers of Haeundae
- Lee Soon-shin, a character in South Korean television series Sharp
- Lee Soon-shin, a character in South Korean television series You Are the Best!

== See also ==
- Yi Sun-sin Bridge
- Yi Sun-sin Stadium
- 舜臣 (disambiguation)
