= Moon Jeong-bog =

South Korean politician

- 문정복
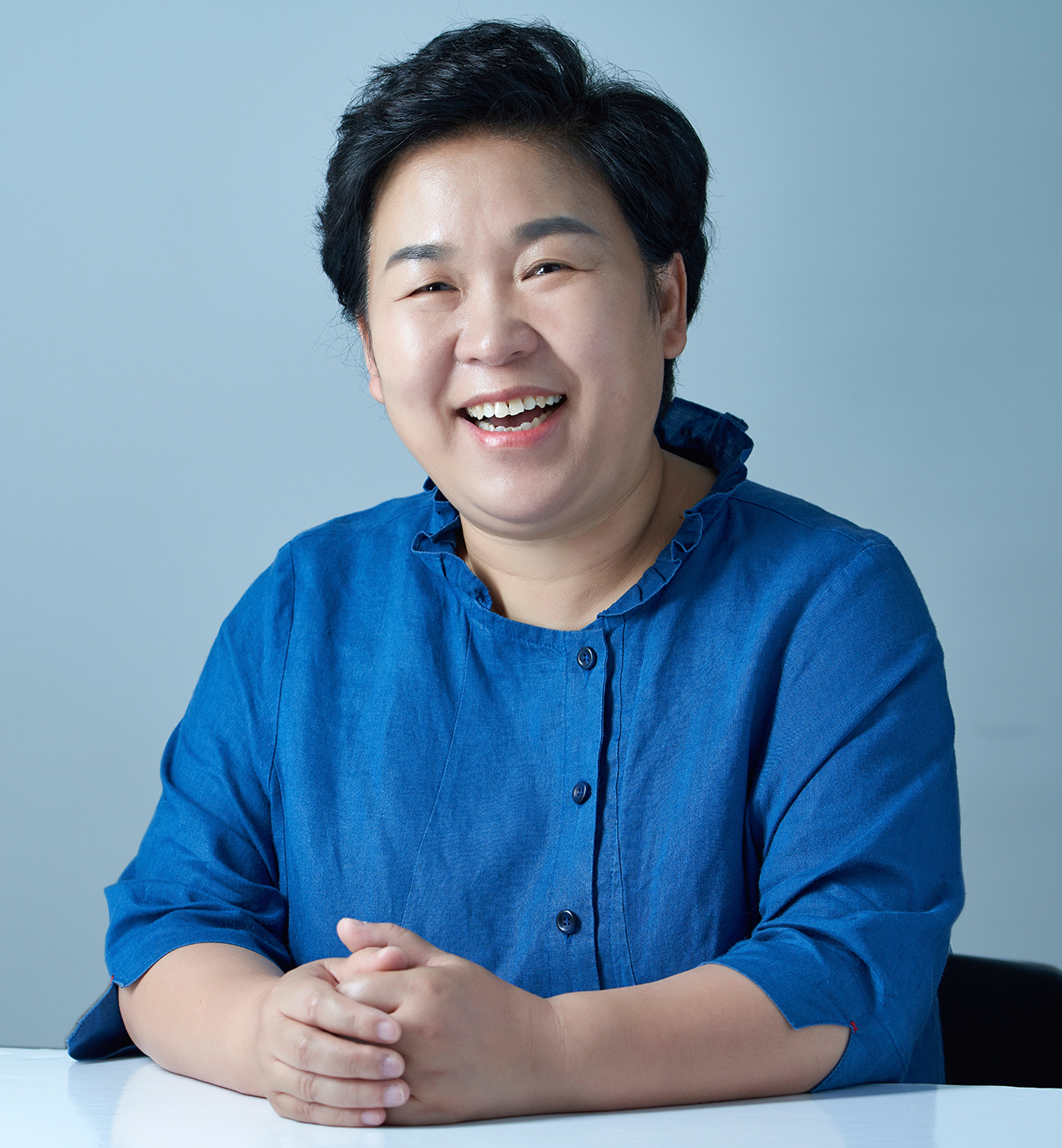

Member of the National Assembly
- Incumbent
- Assumed office 30 May 2020
- Preceded by: Ham Jin-kyu
- Constituency: Gyeonggi Siheung A

Personal details
- Born: 10 January 1967 (age 59)
- Party: Democratic
- Education: Sungkyul University
- Religion: Roman Catholic (Christian name : Solina)

Moon Jeong-bog (Korean: 문정복; Hanja: 文貞福; born 10 January 1967) is a South Korean politician currently representing Siheung at the National Assembly.

Moon previously represented Siheung in Gyeonggido Assembly (similar to Seoul Metropolitan Council but deals with Gyeonggi Province) twice from 2012 to 2017. In 2017 she resigned from the Gyeonggido Assembly to clear accusations of committing fraud at the court as a citizen ending her second term about a year early. Later that year, the court ruled "not guilty." From 2018 she served as the secretary to the President Moon Jae-in at the office of Senior Presidential Secretary for Civil Society before resigning for the general election.

Moon first entered politics in 2007 when she was employed as one of secretaries to Baek Won-woo, then-parliamentarian representing her constituency, without having university degrees. She graduated from Sungkyul University in social welfare in 2020 and is currently taking postgraduate course in policy studies at Ewha Womans University.

In the 2020 general election, Moon defeated the incumbent, two-term parliamentarian Ham Jin-kyu from main opposition party who had defeated Baek in the last two elections.

== Electoral history ==
Election	Year	District	Party affiliation	Votes	Percentage of votes	Results
21st National Assembly General Election	2020	Gyeonggi Siheung A	Democratic Party	68,653	51.7%	Won
