= Lee Si-woo =

Lee Si-woo may refer to:

- Lee Si-woo (volleyball) (born 1994), South Korean male volleyball player
- Lee Si-woo (actress) (born 1997), South Korean actress
- Lee Si-woo (actor) (born 1999), South Korean actor
