= Lutibacter litorisediminis =

Scientific classification
- Domain: Bacteria
- Kingdom: Pseudomonadati
- Phylum: Bacteroidota
- Class: Flavobacteriia
- Order: Flavobacteriales
- Family: Flavobacteriaceae
- Genus: Lutibacter
- Species: L. litorisediminis

Binomial name
- Lutibacter litorisediminis Park et al. 2017

Type strain
- OITF-20

Bacterium

Lutibacter litorisediminis is a Gram-negative, aerobic, rod-shaped and non-motile bacterium from the genus of Lutibacter which has been isolated from a tidal flat in Oido in Korea.
