= 舜臣 =

舜臣, meaning "like Emperor Shun watch", is an Asian given name.

It may refer to:

- Chin Shunshin (陳 舜臣; 1924–2015), Taiwanese and Japanese novelist, translator and cultural critic
- Shun-chen Yang (楊 舜臣), character in the manga Ace of Diamond
- Yi Sun-sin (李舜臣; 1545–1598), also known as Chungmugong, a Korean commander

== See also ==
- Yi Sun-sin (disambiguation)
