= Lutibacter profundi =

Scientific classification
- Domain: Bacteria
- Kingdom: Pseudomonadati
- Phylum: Bacteroidota
- Class: Flavobacteriia
- Order: Flavobacteriales
- Family: Flavobacteriaceae
- Genus: Lutibacter
- Species: L. profundi

Binomial name
- Lutibacter profundi Le Moine Bauer et al. 2016

Type strain
- LP1

Bacterium

Lutibacter profundi is a Gram-negative, rod-shaped and non-motile bacterium from the genus of Lutibacter which has been isolated from the Loki's Castle hydrothermal system from the Arctic Mid-Ocean Ridge.
