= Lutibacter =

Scientific classification
- Domain: Bacteria
- Kingdom: Pseudomonadati
- Phylum: Bacteroidota
- Class: Flavobacteriia
- Order: Flavobacteriales
- Family: Flavobacteriaceae
- Genus: Lutibacter; Choi and Cho 2006

Species
- L. aestuarii L. agarilyticus L. citreus L. crassostreae L. flavus L. holmesii L. litoralis L. litorisediminis L. maritimus L. oceani L. oricola L. profundi

Bacterium

Lutibacter is a genus of gram-negative aerobic or facultatively anaerobic bacteria from the family of Flavobacteriaceae.
