= Lutibacter flavus =

Scientific classification
- Domain: Bacteria
- Kingdom: Pseudomonadati
- Phylum: Bacteroidota
- Class: Flavobacteriia
- Order: Flavobacteriales
- Family: Flavobacteriaceae
- Genus: Lutibacter
- Species: L. flavus

Binomial name
- Lutibacter flavus Choi et al. 2013

Type strain
- IMCC1507

Bacterium

Lutibacter flavus is a Gram-negative, obligately aerobic and non-motile bacterium from the genus of Lutibacter which has been isolated from tidal flat sediments from the Yellow Sea in Korea.
