= Lutibacter agarilyticus =

Scientific classification
- Domain: Bacteria
- Kingdom: Pseudomonadati
- Phylum: Bacteroidota
- Class: Flavobacteriia
- Order: Flavobacteriales
- Family: Flavobacteriaceae
- Genus: Lutibacter
- Species: L. agarilyticus

Binomial name
- Lutibacter agarilyticus Park et al. 2013

Type strain
- KYW566

Bacterium

Lutibacter agarilyticus is a Gram-negative, non-spore-forming and rod-shaped bacterium from the genus of Lutibacter which has been isolated from seawater from the Suncheon Bay in Korea.
