= Lutibacter maritimus =

Scientific classification
- Domain: Bacteria
- Kingdom: Pseudomonadati
- Phylum: Bacteroidota
- Class: Flavobacteriia
- Order: Flavobacteriales
- Family: Flavobacteriaceae
- Genus: Lutibacter
- Species: L. maritimus

Binomial name
- Lutibacter maritimus Park et al. 2010

Type strain
- S7-2

Bacterium

Lutibacter maritimus is a Gram-negative, aerobic and non-motile bacterium from the genus of Lutibacter which has been isolated from tidal flat sediments from Saemankum in Korea.
