= Lutibacter aestuarii =

Scientific classification
- Domain: Bacteria
- Kingdom: Pseudomonadati
- Phylum: Bacteroidota
- Class: Flavobacteriia
- Order: Flavobacteriales
- Family: Flavobacteriaceae
- Genus: Lutibacter
- Species: L. aestuarii

Binomial name
- Lutibacter aestuarii Lee et al. 2012

Type strain
- MA-My1

Bacterium

Lutibacter aestuarii is a Gram-negative, non-spore-forming and non-motile bacterium from the genus of Lutibacter which has been isolated from sediments of tidal flat from the South Sea in Korea.
