= Lutibacter holmesii =

Scientific classification
- Domain: Bacteria
- Kingdom: Pseudomonadati
- Phylum: Bacteroidota
- Class: Flavobacteriia
- Order: Flavobacteriales
- Family: Flavobacteriaceae
- Genus: Lutibacter
- Species: L. holmesii

Binomial name
- Lutibacter holmesii Nedashkovskaya et al. 2015

Bacterium

Lutibacter holmesii is a Gram-negative, strictly aerobic, rod-shaped and non-motile bacterium from the genus of Lutibacter which has been isolated from a sea urchin (Strongylocentrotus intermedius) from the Troitsa Bay in the Sea of Japan.
