= Lutibacter litoralis =

Scientific classification
- Domain: Bacteria
- Kingdom: Pseudomonadati
- Phylum: Bacteroidota
- Class: Flavobacteriia
- Order: Flavobacteriales
- Family: Flavobacteriaceae
- Genus: Lutibacter
- Species: L. litoralis

Binomial name
- Lutibacter litoralis Choi and Cho 2006

Type strain
- CL-TF09

Bacterium

Lutibacter litoralis is a rod-shaped bacterium from the genus of Lutibacter which has been isolated from a tidal flat from Ganghwa in Korea.
