= Kim Yong-san =

South Korean businessman (1922–2011)

- Hangul: 김용산
- Hanja: 金用山
- RR: Gim Yongsan
- MR: Kim Yongsan

Kim Yong-san (October 13, 1922 – July 14, 2011) was a South Korean businessman. He was born in Siheung, Keiki-dō, Korea, Empire of Japan. He is a pioneer in the industrialization of South Korea, specifically the construction business. In 1948 he founded the Kukdong Business Group, one of the largest construction companies in South Korea. His company has built many famous projects which include; KLCC Building in Kuala Lumpur (currently the third tallest building in the world), Korea World Trade Center, as well as many other projects, both domestically and internationally.

== See also ==
- Hyundai
- Economy of South Korea
