= Lutibacter citreus =

Scientific classification
- Domain: Bacteria
- Kingdom: Pseudomonadati
- Phylum: Bacteroidota
- Class: Flavobacteriia
- Order: Flavobacteriales
- Family: Flavobacteriaceae
- Genus: Lutibacter
- Species: L. citreus

Binomial name
- Lutibacter citreus Du et al. 2020

Type strain
- 1KV19

Bacterium

Lutibacter citreus is a Gram-negative, aerobic, rod-shaped and non-motile bacterium from the genus of Lutibacter which has been isolated from surface sediments from the Arctic.
