= Lutibacter oricola =

Scientific classification
- Domain: Bacteria
- Kingdom: Pseudomonadati
- Phylum: Bacteroidota
- Class: Flavobacteriia
- Order: Flavobacteriales
- Family: Flavobacteriaceae
- Genus: Lutibacter
- Species: L. oricola

Binomial name
- Lutibacter oricola Sung et al. 2015

Type strain
- UDC377

Bacterium

Lutibacter oricola is a Gram-negative, aerobic, rod-shaped and non-motile bacterium from the genus of Lutibacter which has been isolated from seawater from Seo-do from the Liancourt Rocks.
