= Lutibacter oceani =

Scientific classification
- Domain: Bacteria
- Kingdom: Pseudomonadati
- Phylum: Bacteroidota
- Class: Flavobacteriia
- Order: Flavobacteriales
- Family: Flavobacteriaceae
- Genus: Lutibacter
- Species: L. oceani

Binomial name
- Lutibacter oceani Sundararaman and Lee 2017

Type strain
- 325-5

Bacterium

Lutibacter oceani is a Gram-negative, facultatively anaerobic, short-rod-shaped, non-spore-forming and non-motile bacterium from the genus of Lutibacter which has been isolated from marine sediments from Korea.
