= Lutibacter crassostreae =

Scientific classification
- Domain: Bacteria
- Kingdom: Pseudomonadati
- Phylum: Bacteroidota
- Class: Flavobacteriia
- Order: Flavobacteriales
- Family: Flavobacteriaceae
- Genus: Lutibacter
- Species: L. crassostreae

Binomial name
- Lutibacter crassostreae Park et al. 2015

Type strain
- TYO-8

Bacterium

Lutibacter crassostreae is a Gram-negative, aerobic and non-spore-forming bacterium from the genus of Lutibacter which has been isolated from an oyster from the South Sea in Korea.
