= Lee Si-woo (volleyball) =

South Korean volleyball player (born 1994)

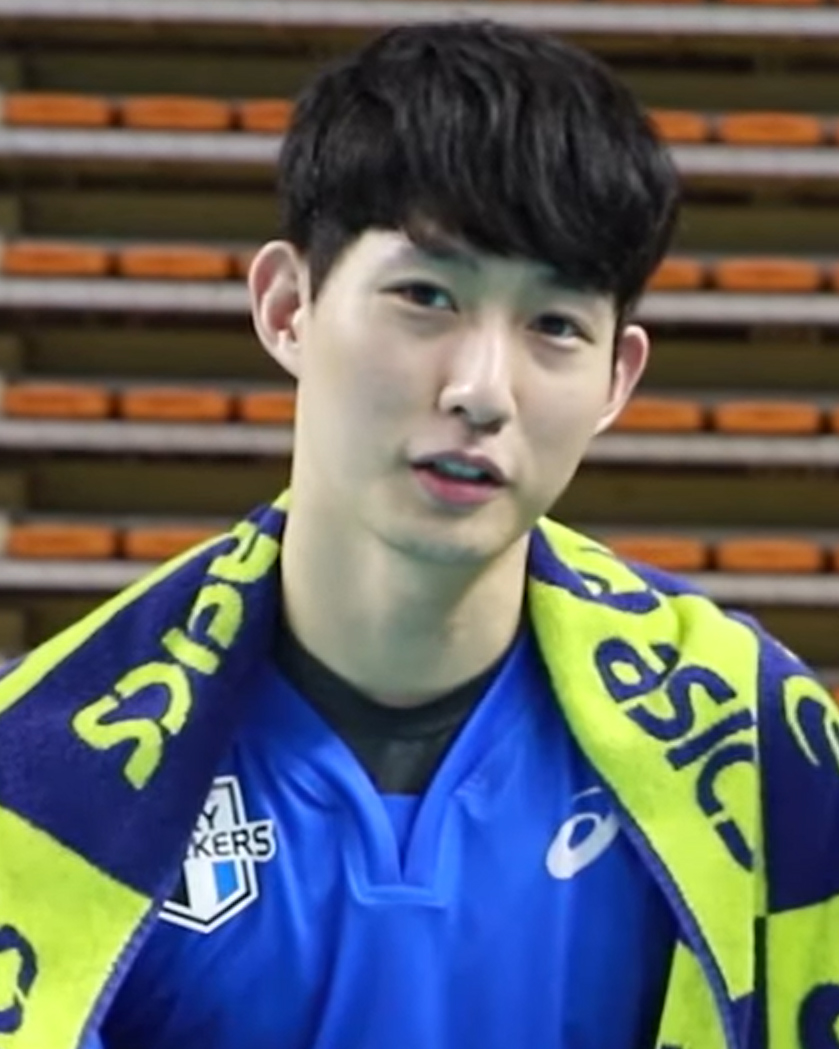
- Lee in 2019

Personal information
- Nationality: South Korean
- Born: 7 April 1994 (age 32); Siheung, Gyeonggi Province, South Korea
- Height: 188 cm (6 ft 2 in)
- Weight: 80 kg (176 lb)
- Spike: 300 cm (9 ft 10 in)
- Block: 290 cm (9 ft 6 in)
- Education: Sungkyunkwan University

Volleyball information
- Position: Wing spiker
- Current club: Hyundai Capital Skywalkers
- Number: 15

Career
Years	Teams
2016–	Hyundai Capital Skywalkers

National team
2017–	South Korea
Honours
Asian Championship
Bronze medal – third place	2017 Gresik
- Last updated: 29 December 2017

Lee Si-woo (Korean: 이시우; born 7 April 1994) is a South Korean male volleyball player. He is part of the South Korea men's national volleyball team. On club level he currently plays for the Cheonan Hyundai Capital Skywalkers.

== Career ==
=== Clubs ===
In the 2016 V-League Draft, Lee was selected sixth overall by the Hyundai Capital Skywalkers.

In the 2016–17 season, Lee won his first championship, helping the Skywalkers clinch their third V-League title. Playing as primarily a serving specialist, he served 12 aces while adding 13 kills and 10 digs.

=== National team ===
In May 2017 Lee was first selected for the South Korean senior national team to compete at the 2017 FIVB World League. He appeared in all nine games and tallied three aces as a serving specialist.

After finishing the World League in 18th place, he also took part in the 2017 Asian Championship, where South Korea won the bronze medal.
