= Bangsan-dong =

Neighborhood in Seoul, South Korea

Coordinates: 37.57°N 127°E

- Interactive map of Bangsan-dong
- Country: South Korea

Area
  - Total: 0.06 km^{2} (0.023 sq mi)

Korean name
- Hangul: 방산동
- Hanja: 芳山洞
- RR: Bangsan-dong
- MR: Pangsan-dong

Bangsan-dong (Korean: 방산동) is a legal dong, or neighborhood, of Jung District, Seoul, South Korea and governed by its administrative dong, Euljiro 3, 4, 5ga-dong.

== See also ==
- Administrative divisions of South Korea
