= Oido =

Island in Gyeonggi-do, South Korea

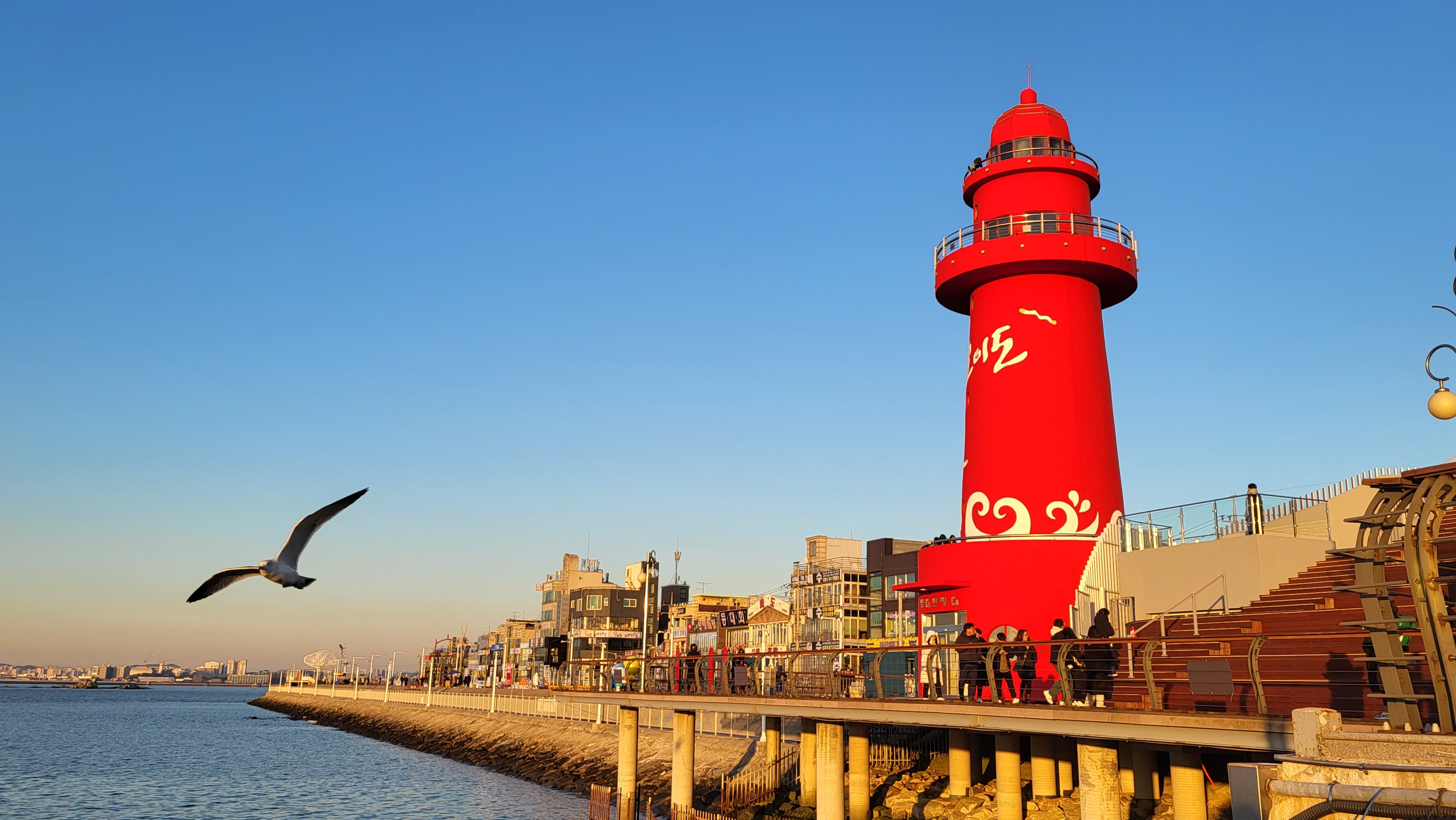
- The coastline of Oido (2023)

Geography
- Coordinates: 37°20′N 126°42′E

Korean name
- Hangul: 오이도
- Hanja: 烏耳島
- RR: Oido
- MR: Oido

Oido (Korean: 오이도; lit. crow's ear island) is an area in Siheung, Gyeonggi-do, South Korea. As its name suggests, it was previously an island, but land reclamation projects in the 20th century led to it eventually joining the mainland.

== Etymology ==
The place's name is literally "crow's ears"; this is unrelated to the shape of the former island. Its original name was reportedly Ojilido (오질이도; 吾叱耳島).

== Description ==
Oido has shell mounds throughout the whole area, with the largest of the mounds located on the West Coast. The Oido shell mounds are the only remains of the exchanges between the North and South Neolithic cultures of the Korean Peninsula. The mounds also provide information on the Neolithic area's changing coastal environment.

Historically, the island had sandy beaches and a range of hills that stretched from north to south. It had farmland and mudflats on the eastern side. The appearance of the interior of the island is reportedly relatively preserved, but the coastline has changed greatly after the land reclamation.

== History ==
In 1018, it was made part of Ansan-hyeon (안산현; 安山縣). The early years of the Joseon dynasty, called O-jil-ae-do (吾叱耳島), occurred during the reign of King Seongjong (r. 1469–1494) in the Joseon period. In 1757, Silla was incorporated into the Janggu-gun. It received its current name during the reign of King Jeongjo (r. 1776–1780) On August 4, 1896 it was reorganized to be Ma-you meon, Ansan-gun and Gyeonggi. On April 1, 1914 it was incorporated into Jeong-wang-li, Gun-ja-myeon and Si-heong-gun. In 1940, it was renamed Ansan-gun (안산군; 安山郡). On May 1, 1985 it was reorganized to be Ansan-gun and Incheon. On January 1, 1989 it was reorganized to be part of Jeongwang-dong, Siheung.

== Transportation ==
- Oido Station is the last station of Seoul Subway Line 4 and the Suin Line. It is about three minutes on foot from Oido Station. One can also take a bus.

== Tourist attractions ==
- Dinosaur Egg Fossil Place Visiting Center (공룡알 화석지 방문센터): In 1999, fossil dinosaur eggs were found around Ueumdo (우음도) in the center of Sihwaho Lake (시화호). They were formed about 100 million years ago during the Cretaceous period of the Mesozoic Era. More than 200 dinosaur eggs were discovered, and the site was designated Natural Monument No. 414. It is valued for academic research and displays fossil exhibits and dinosaur models.
- Oido's Shell Festival promotes the customs and flavors of the Oido people and its fishing village life to tourists. The festival is held on Oido's food culture street every October. Typical events of the festival include catching eels with one's bare hands and shell gathering. Many local dishes of Oido are for sale and it consists of seafood and local specialties. After the Si-heung city stopped funding the festival in 2014, the festival got smaller. Originally, the festival was held for 2 to 3 days but, the last festival lasted only one day and the number of tourists that came decreased from 20000 to 10000.
- Ok-gu Park (옥구공원): Ok-gu Island had controlled visitors' access until 1998 because of the coastguard station. After 1998, Si-heung city made Ok-gu island an Eco-friendly park for families who live in the capital areas. Ok-gu Park opened in 2000 and is composed of 'Hometown Hill (고향마을)', 'Mugunghwa Hill (무궁화 마을)', Marsh Eco Park (갯벌체험광장) and Lotus Flower Complex (연꽃단지) among other sites. Ok-gu park held the 'Gyeong-gi gardening culture fair' in 2010.
- Oido Commemorative Park (오이도기념공원) : The park is located at the starting point of Siwha Seawall. There are various attractions including an honorary monument, observatory, tideland education plaza, inline skating rink, bicycle rental and other facilities.
- Oido Food Culture Street (오이도음식문화거리) : Gyeong-gi province designated Oido food culture street as a model food culture. The local dishes like sliced raw fish (활어회), noodle soup with clams (바지락칼국수) and roasted clams (조개구이) are popular.
- Red Lighthouse (빨간등대).
- Odio Marine Observatory (오이도 함상전망대): An observatory built on a ship off the coast of Oido, Siheung-si, Gyeonggi-do.
- Siheung Oido Museum (시흥오이도박물관) : The museum offers an opportunity to understand the excavated artifacts of Siheung and experience the prehistoric life culture.
- Historic Site of Oido, Siheung (시흥 오이도 유적): It is a site of the Neolithic Period located in Oido, Jeongwang-dong, Siheung-si, Gyeonggi-do. It is Historic Site No. 441. It is distributed in a wide area (about 8,000 m^{2}) at the entrance to Oido, and is the largest shell mound on the west coast. It is a representative site of Korea's west coast region, which shows the flow of inter-Korean relations in the Neolithic culture of the Korean Peninsula, inter-Korean exchanges with inland areas, and the adaptation process of the Neolithic.

== Gallery ==
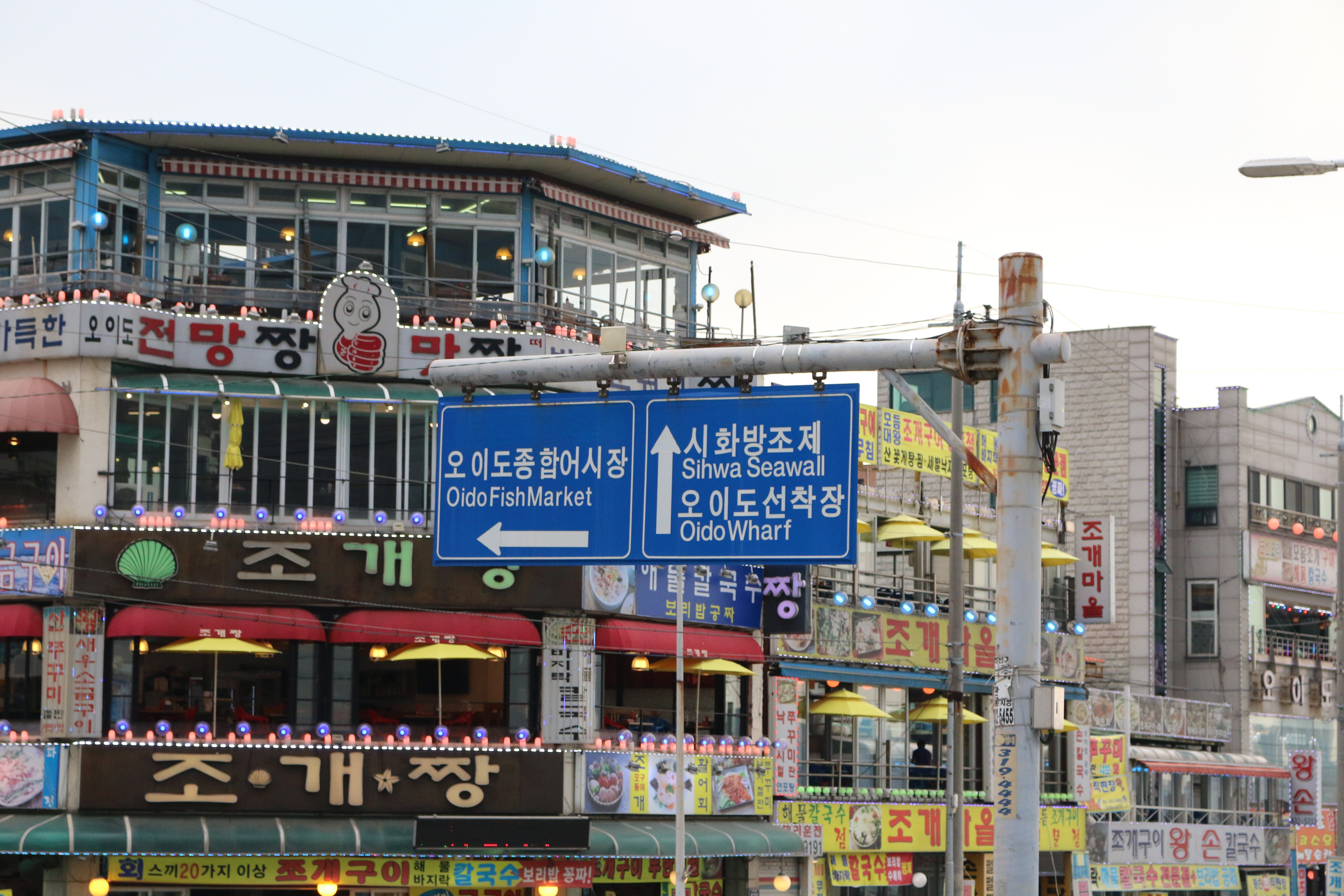
Places where people can eat Oido's traditional food.

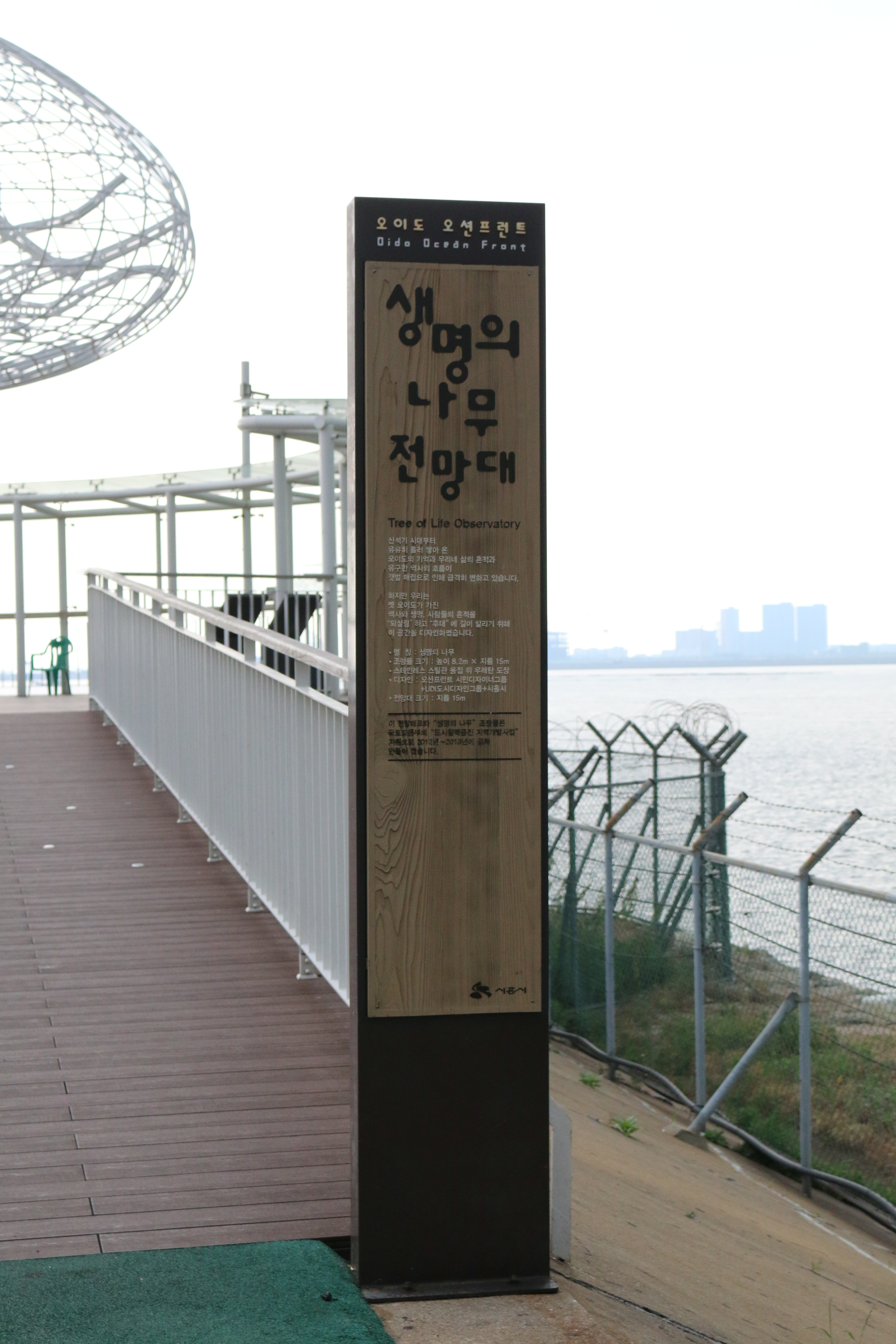
Sightseeing place where people can see a tree of life.

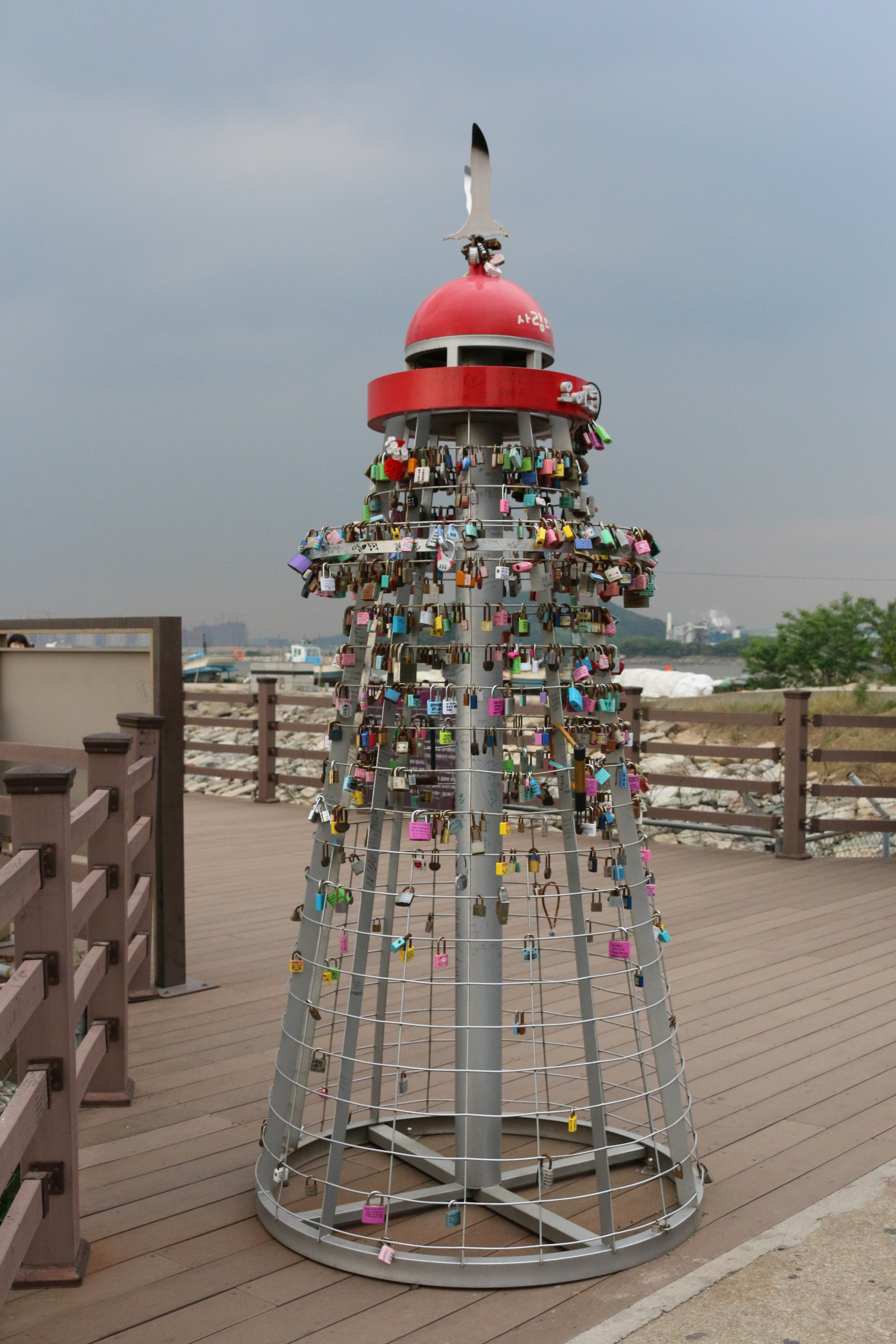
People put key chains here, indicating they have visited.

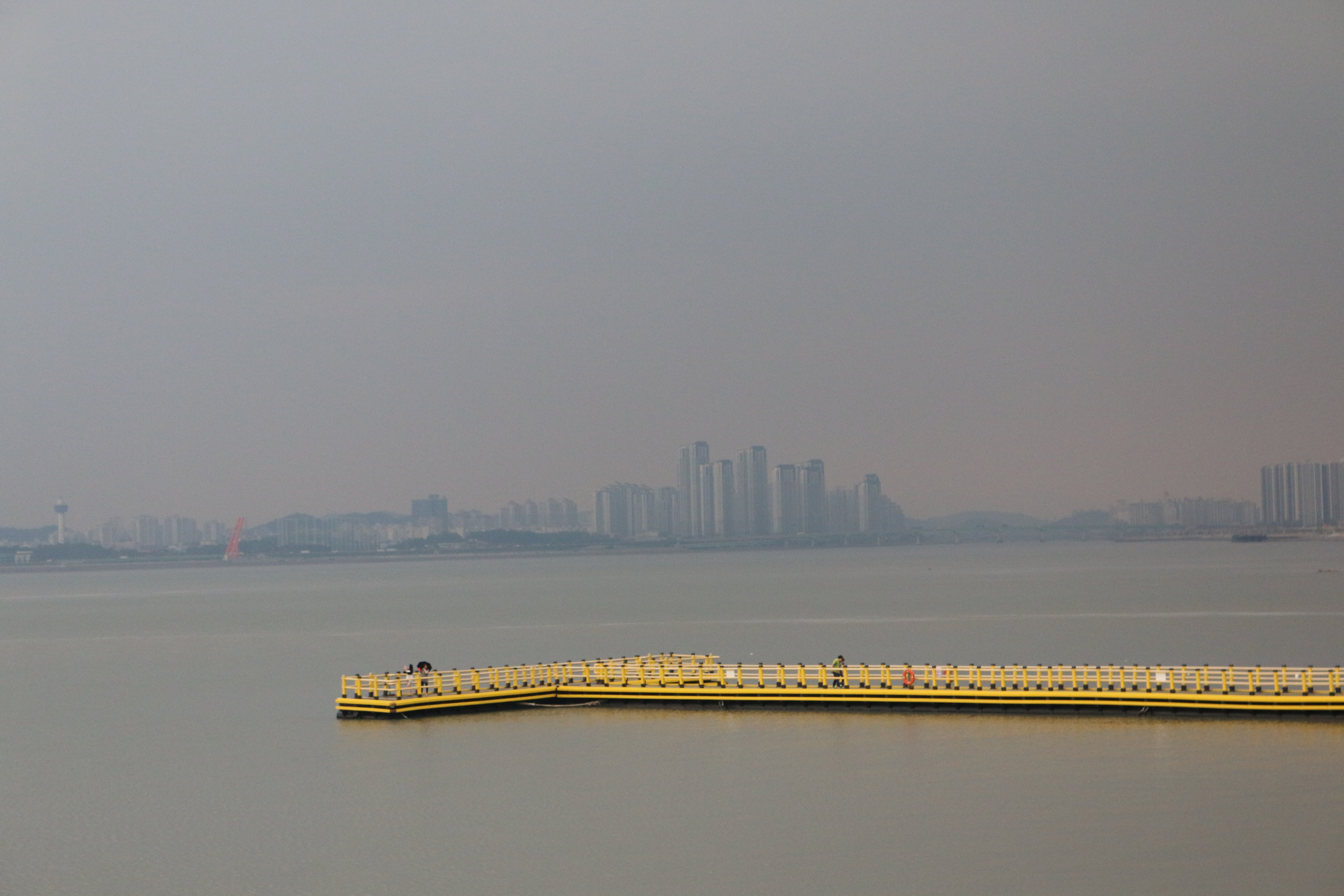
Yellow Street, where people can walk over the ocean.

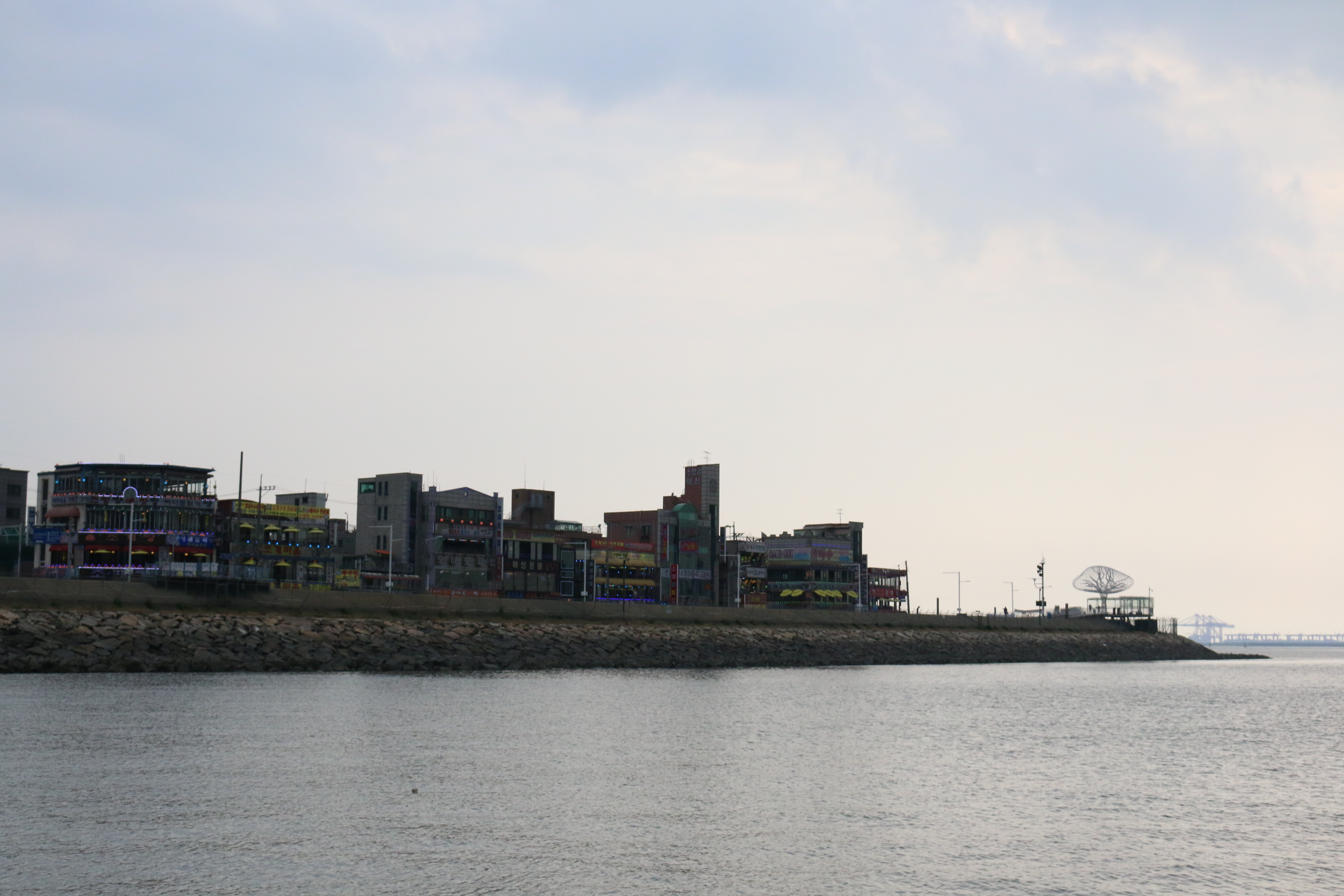
View of Oido.

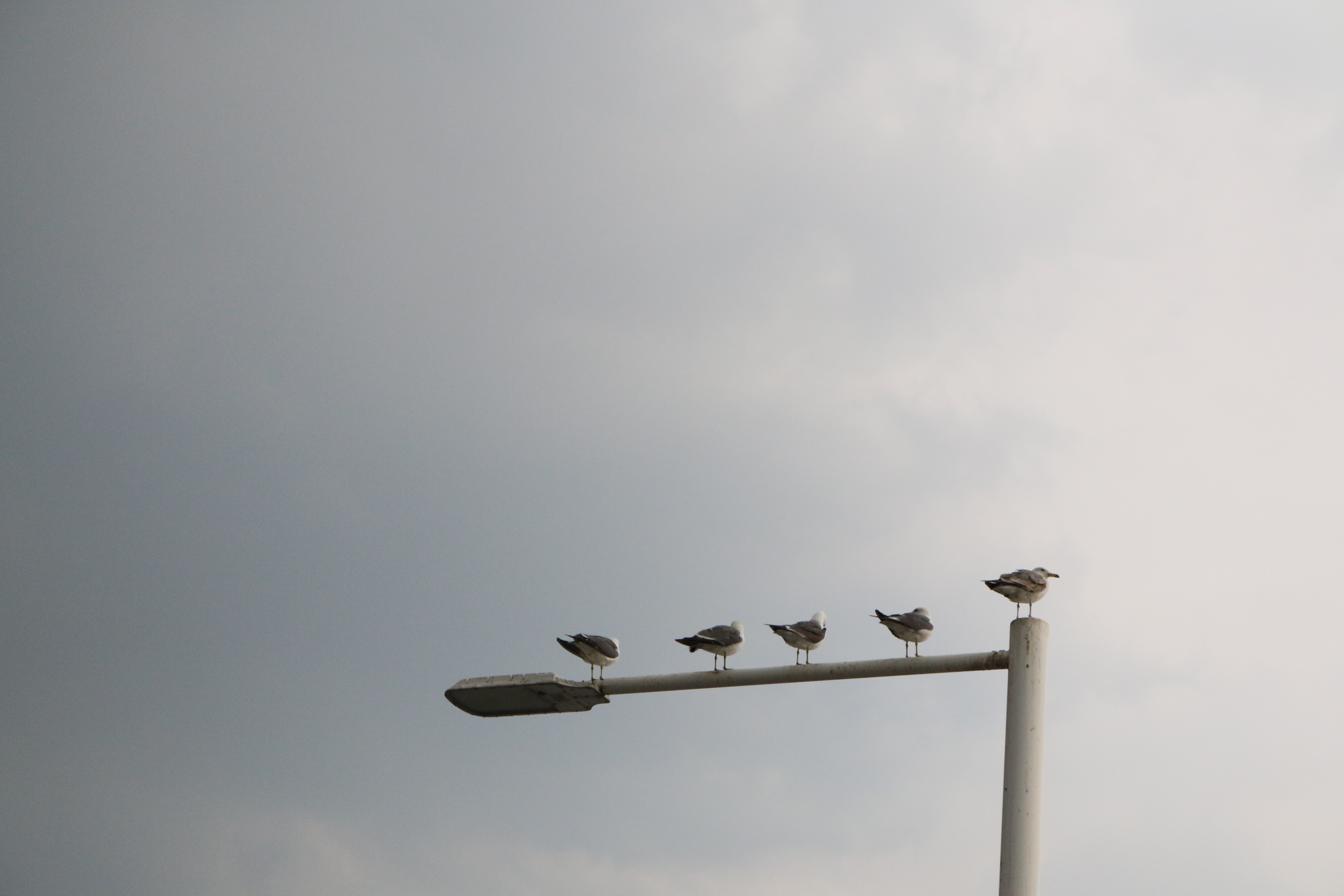
Common gulls in Oido.

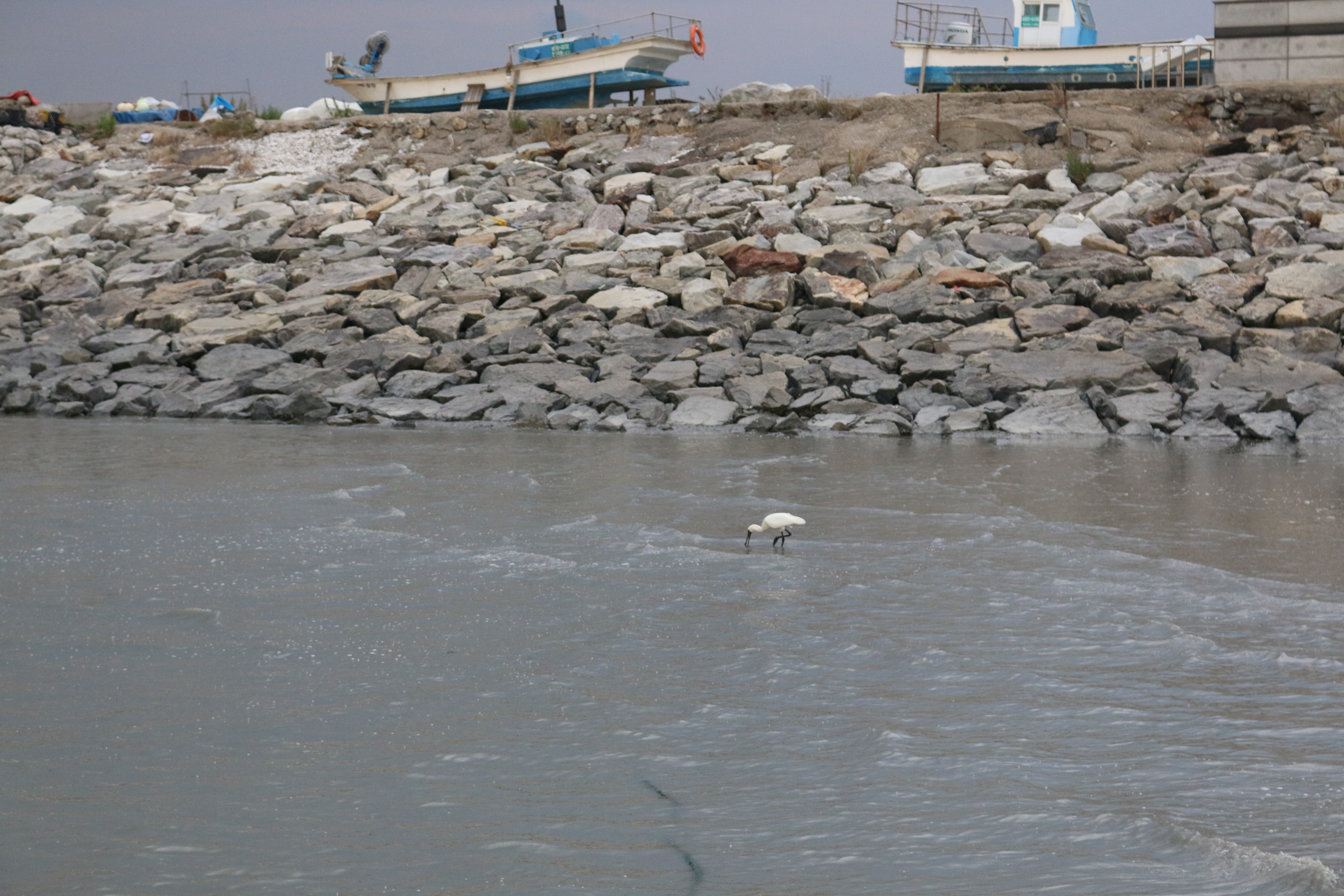
Migratory birds in Oido.

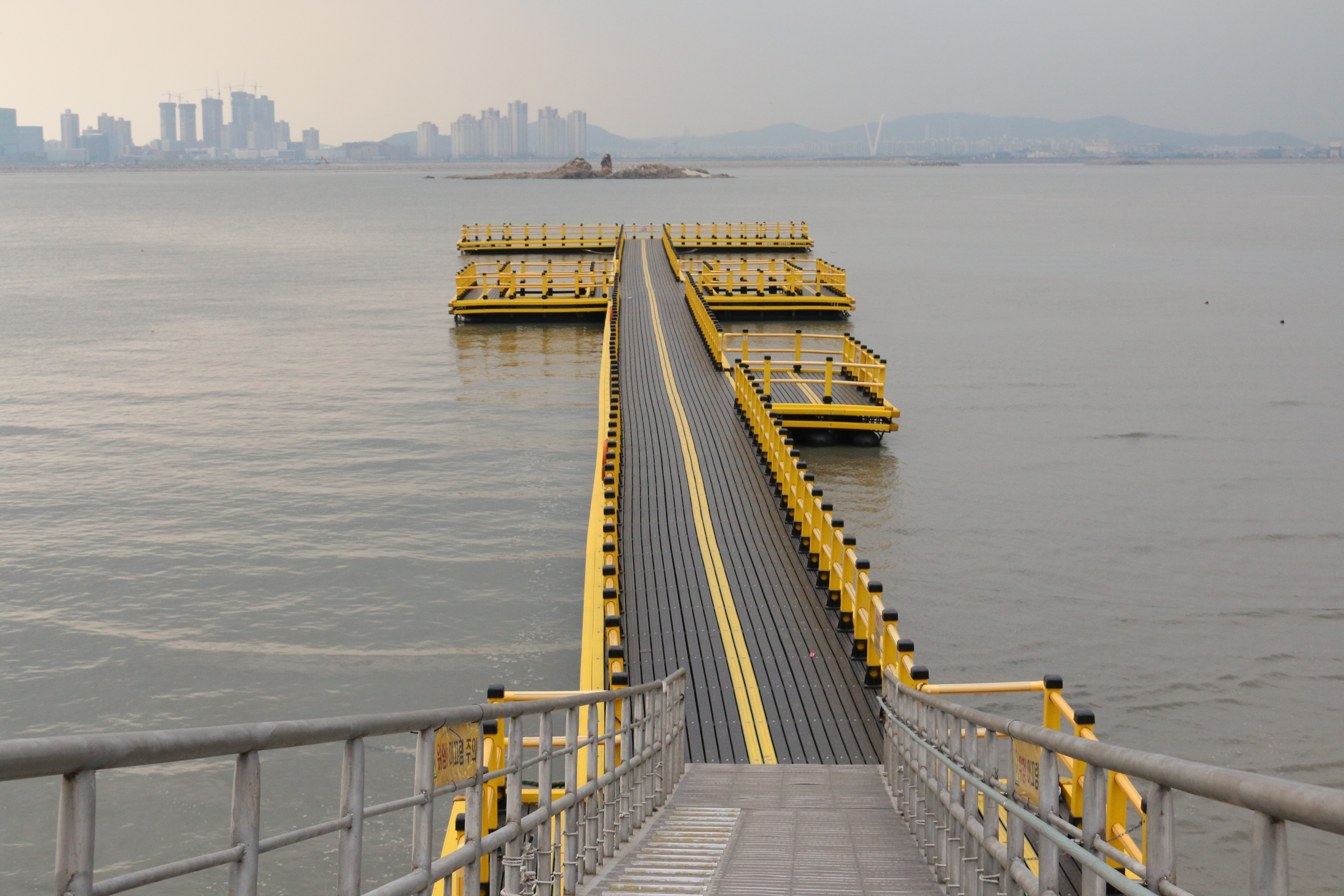
People can walk over the ocean here.

== See also ==
- Siheung
- Ansan
