= Wolgot =

- neighborhood
- Country: South Korea

Korean name
- Hangul: 월곶동
- Hanja: 月串洞
- RR: Wolgot-dong
- MR: Wŏlgot-tong

Wolgot (Korean: 월곶) is a dong, neighbourhood of Siheung in Gyeonggi Province southwest of Seoul and east of Incheon, bordering on Soraepogu. There is also a fishing harbor on the local ocean inlet, near which numerous high-rise apartment buildings are located. Several small hotels and seafood restaurants also serve visitors. In June 2012 a new subway station was opened on the Suin Line, a new subway line currently open next to Seoul Subway Line 4 of the Seoul Metropolitan Subway system. Many buses also stop in Wolgot. On March 1, 2014, it was separated from Gunja-dong.

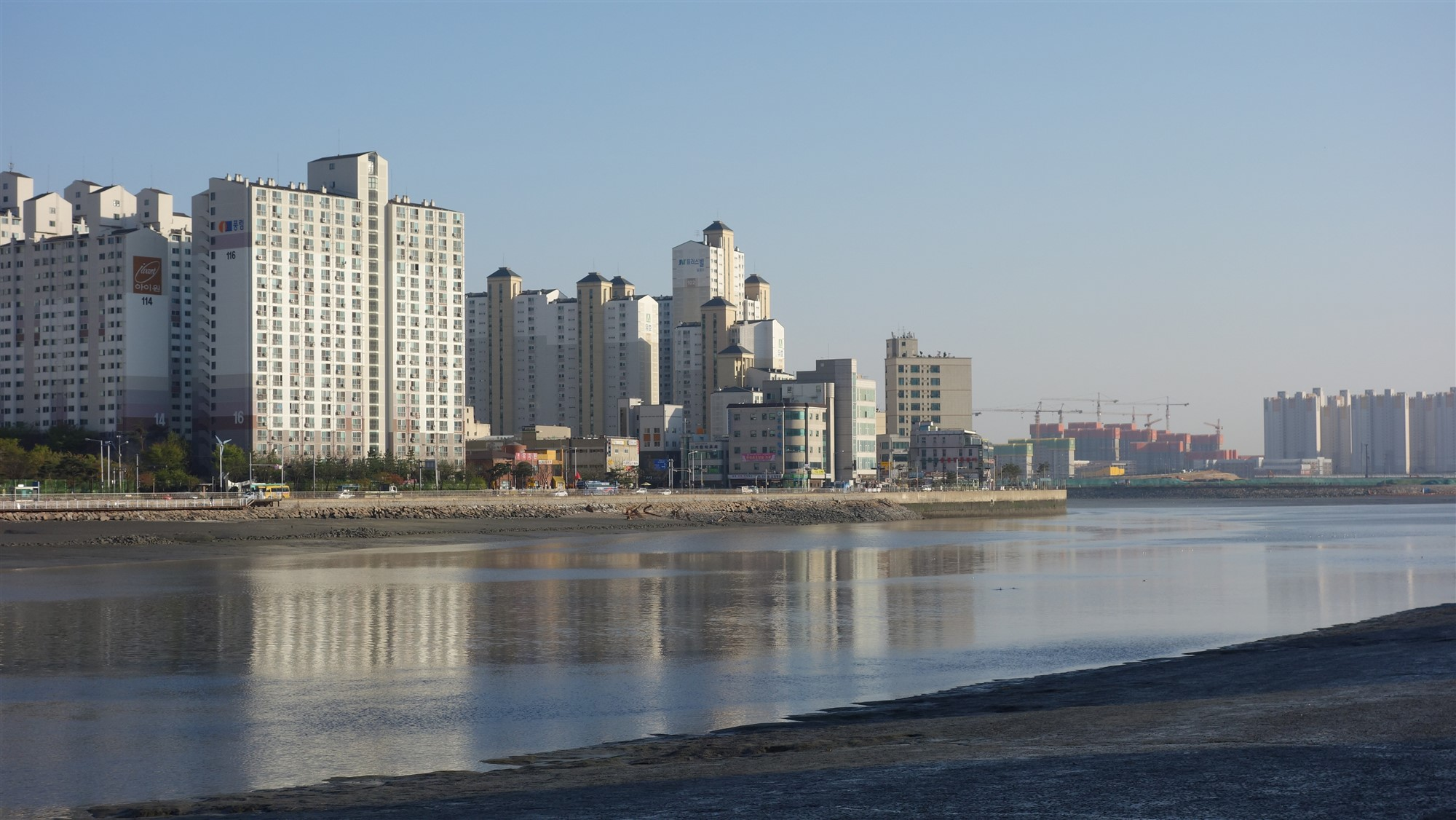
View of Wolgot from Soraepogu

== School ==
- Wolgot Middle School
- Wolpo Elementary School
- Wolgot Elementary School
