= Shixing (disambiguation) =

Shixing may refer to:

- Shixing County, Guangdong Province, China
- Liu Jun, Prince Shixing (429–453), imperial prince of the Chinese dynasty Liu Song
- Shixing language

== See also ==
- 始興, disambiguation page for related titles
- Siheung (disambiguation)
