= Siheung County =

Former county in Gyeonggi Province, South Korea

- Hangul: 시흥군
- Hanja: 始興郡
- RR: Siheung-gun
- MR: Sihŭng-gun

Siheung County (Korean: 시흥군) was a county (gun) in Gyeonggi Province, South Korea. This county was abolished in 1989 as its one town (읍) of Sorae and two townships (면) of Gunja and Suam became Siheung City at the same time. Today's Siheung City area did not belong to Siheung County before 1914. The area rather was part of old Incheon or Ansan.

== Original Siheung, prior to 1914 ==
Today's eastern part of Guro-gu, most part of Yeongdeungpo-gu(excepting Yeouido and Yanghwa-dong), most part of Gwanak-gu, Geumcheon-gu, part of Dongjak-gu in Seoul, Gwangmyeong City, and some part(Seoksu-dong and Bakdal-dong) of Anyang City in Gyeonggi belonged to the "original" Siheung Country, before the rearrangement of administrative districts by the Japanese colonial government in 1914. The county office was in Siheung-dong, Geumcheon-gu, Seoul.

In Goguryeo era, this area was called "Ingbeollo(잉벌노)"(or Neumnae, 늠내), in Unified Silla Dynasty era Gogyang-hyeon (穀壤縣), and in Goryeo era its name changed to "Geumju(금주, 衿州)." In 1413, it was rebranded as Geumcheon(금천, 衿川) Prefecture and its name changed again "Siheung" in 1785. The prefecture became a county as the rearrangement of administrative districts in 1895 was implemented.

Most part of Anyang, Gunpo, Gwacheon in Gyeonggi, and part of Dongjak-gu, most of Seocho-gu, Namhyeon-dong of Gwanak-gu in Seoul consisted of Gwacheon County; southern part of today's southern part of Siheung City and most of Ansan City belonged to Ansan County. Northern part of Siheung City belonged to Incheon Metropolitan Prefecture (i.e. Incheon Dohobu, 인천도호부). In 1914, the two counties of Gwacheon and Ansan were annexed into Siheung County as part of rearrangement policy of administrative districts.

=== Administrative districts under original Siheung County ===
- South Township (남면) - western Gwangmyeong
- West Township (서면) - eastern Gwangmyeong
- Upper-North Township (상북면) - the west part of Yeongdeungpo-gu and the eastern part of Guro-gu
- Lower-North Township (하북면) - the east part of Yeongdeungpo-gu (including "central" Yeongdeungpo, but excepting Yeouido) and Sindaebang-dong, Daebang-dong in Dongjak-gu
- East Township (동면) - Gasan-dong and Doksan-dong in Geumcheon-gu, most part of Gwanak-gu(except for today's Namhyeon-dong) and Sangdo-dong in Dongjak-gu
- County Centre Township (군내면) - Siheung-dong in Geumcheon-gu(the county centre ) and Seoksu-dong, Bakdal-dong in Anyang

== After 1914 and the end in 1989 ==
In 1914, Ansan County and Gwacheon County were annexed to Siheung County as a result of the reorganisation scheme of districts by the Japanese colonial government in Korea. Throughout modern Korean history, many parts of Siheung County were separated or annexed into several administrative districts. In 1936, the township of Yeongdeungpo and some part of North township (now most part of Dongjak-gu) were annexed to Gyeongseongbu, or colonial Seoul. In 1949, the villages(리) of Guro and Sindorim were annexed to Seoul. In 1963, Seoul absorbed several Siheung County townships of East (now Geumcheon-gu, Gwanak-gu, and Dongjak-gu) and Sindong (now Seocho-gu), while Hwaseong County's township of Uiwang was absorbed by Siheung and the county office in Yeongdeungpo moved to Anyang township. In 1973, the township of Anyang separated as Anyang City and Sorae township of Bucheon County, now northern part of Siheung City, was ceded to Siheung County. In 1981, the township of Soha and the county branch of Gwangmyeong, instead of being annexed to Seoul, became Gwangmyeong City. In 1986, the county branch of Gwacheon(formerly Gwacheon township) became Gwacheon City, while some part of Gunja and Suam townships were annexed into a new-born city, Ansan. In 1989, Siheung County was abolished and its townships became Siheung, Gunpo, and Uiwang City respectively.

== Tourism ==
- Siheung Lotus Theme Park (Gwangok-ji) - In the ninth year of King Sejong's reign, Kang hui-maeng (1463) brings a lotus flower while he is on his way to the Ming Dynasty. Upon arriving in Joseon, Kang HuI-maeng planted seeds in a pond in Siheung, Gyeonggi-do. The small pond of Gwangok-ji is filled with lotus flowers.
