= Yi Sunsin (born 1554) =

Korean military official (born 1554)

- 이순신
- Born: January 30, 1554; Siheung, Joseon
- Died: September 11, 1611 (aged 57); Jeonju, Joseon
- Military career
- Allegiance: Joseon
- Rank: Second junior rank (종2품)
- Conflicts: Imjin War: Battle of Okpo; Battle of Sacheon (1592); Battle of Hansando; Chŏngyu War: Battle of Noryang

- Yi Sunsin
- Hangul: 이순신
- Hanja: 李純信
- RR: I Sunsin
- MR: I Sunsin

Courtesy name
- Hangul: 입부
- Hanja: 立夫
- RR: Ipbu
- MR: Ippu

Posthumous name
- Hangul: 무의
- Hanja: 武毅
- RR: Muui
- MR: Muŭi

Yi Sunsin (Korean: 이순신; Hanja: 李純信; January 30, 1554 – September 11, 1611) was a Korean military official of the mid-Joseon period. He was a general under Admiral Yi Sun-sin during the Imjin War.

== Biography ==
Yi Sunsin was born on January 30, 1554, in Siheung, Gyeonggi Province. In September 1577, he passed the military examination (무과; 武科), winning the first place in archery. After serving as a Herald (선전관; 宣傳官), he was appointed the magistrate of Gangjin in 1582. However, he was dismissed in 1585 due to friction with the powerful gentry family (호족; 豪族) in Gangjin. In 1586, he became an assistant magistrate of Onsong by the recommendation of his former teacher, Kim Sŏngil. In 1588, he was appointed as an assistant magistrate of Uiju and was in charge of the performance of envoys from the Ming dynasty. The envoy of the Ming dynasty demanded a bribe, but Yi refused, and when the envoy of the Ming dynasty tried to report him, he resigned his post. He was appointed as Associate Commander of Hyesan (혜산첨사; 惠山僉使) due to the increased invasion of the Jurchens in the north but was unable to defeat them because of his disease. In 1591, he was appointed as Associate Commander of Bangdap and prepared to fight against the Japanese by rearranging military officers, repairing their fortresses and weapons.

Upon the outbreak of the Imjin War, Yi served as a Central Commandant (중위장; 中衛將) in the Admiral Yi's first campaign. Since then, he had always been at the vanguard as Front Commandant (전부장; 前部將). He led the vanguard and lured the Japanese troops. After the Battle of Hansando Admiral Yi Sun-sin, who felt sorry that his contribution was not recognized, suggested to the government his promotion and he was eventually promoted to Jeolchung (절충; 折衝), third senior rank and appointed the Naval Commander of Chungcheong Province. However, he was dismissed due to the strict application of the penal code and demoted to the Associate Commander of Goryang. In 1597, when the Japanese second invasion broke out, he was appointed as the Naval Commander of Right Gyeongsang Province to replace Bae Seol who fled from the Battle of Chilcheollyang. Later, he served as a Central Commandant again under Admiral Yi Sun-sin. When Yi Sun-sin was killed by enemy bullets in the Battle of Noryang, he commanded Joseon's naval forces.

After the Japanese Invasion of Korea, Chen Lin, a general of the Ming dynasty, recommended Yi as the Naval Generalissimo of the Three Provinces (삼도수군통제사; 三道水軍統制使), and although the Border Defense Council (비변사; 備邊司) agreed, Censorate (대간; 臺諫) opposed it. In January 1599, he resigned from his position as a Naval Commander and was appointed to the Police Chief (포도대장; 捕盜大將), but was dismissed for killing an innocent person. Since then, he had repeatedly been promoted to various government posts and dismissed from his post. In 1604, he was appointed the Fifth Minister (of the Office of Ministers-without-Portfolio) (첨지중추부사; 僉知中樞府事) and listed as the third rank of Seonmu Merit Subjects (선무공신; 宣武功臣) in recognition of his contribution during the Japanese Invasion of Korea in and given the title of Wansangun (완산군; 完山君). He was retitled as Wancheongun (완천군; 完川君) the following year after serving as the magistrate of Suwon in 1606. In 1608, when King Seonjo died and Gwanghaegun was crowned, Yi was also questioned for his involvement in the death of Imhaegun. In 1610, he was appointed as Army Commander of Jeolla Province but died on September 11, 1611. His tomb is located Gwangmyeong, Gyeonggi-do, South Korea.

== In popular culture ==
- Portrayed by Jeon Hyun in the 2004–2005 KBS1 TV series Immortal Admiral Yi Sun-sin.

== See also ==
- History of Korea
- Naval history of Korea
