= Siheung-dong =

Coordinates: 37°25′N 127°05′E

- Interactive map of Siheung-dong
- Country: South Korea

Area
  - Total: 6.28 km^{2} (2.42 sq mi)

Population (2001)
  - Total: 128,142
  - Density: 20,405/km^{2} (52,850/sq mi)

Korean name
- Hangul: 시흥동
- Hanja: 始興洞
- RR: Siheung-dong
- MR: Sihŭng-dong

Siheung-dong (Korean: 시흥동) is a dong (neighbourhood) of Geumcheon District, Seoul, South Korea.

== Overview ==
According to the Geography Section of the Goryeosa, the name "Siheung" (始興) was first officially recorded in 991 during the reign of King Seongjong of Goryeo. The term "Siheung" is interpreted to mean "to rise," "to extend," or "to become foremost." The earlier name for the region, "Ingbeolno" (仍伐奴), dates back to the Goguryeo period. The syllable "Ingbeol" is thought to have undergone phonetic transformation to "Neum," signifying "extension" (延長), while "No" is believed to be a phonetic rendering of "Nae," meaning "earth" or "plain." This suggests a semantic continuity between the names Siheung and Ingbeolno.

Even before its designation as an official administrative name, the area had been commonly referred to as Siheung. In 1413, during the 13th year of King Taejong's reign in the Joseon Dynasty, the area was renamed "Geumcheon" (衿川), but the name Siheung continued to be used informally.

In 1795, during the 19th year of King Jeongjo’s reign, the area was officially renamed "Siheung-hyeon" (Siheung Prefecture), and its administrative status was elevated from hyeongam (rank 6) to hyeollyeong (rank 5). From 1790 to 1800, King Jeongjo undertook twelve royal processions to Hyeonryungwon, the royal tomb in Suwon. One of the routes passed through present-day areas such as Donghwamun, Namdaemun, Hangang Bridge, Jangseungbaegi, Sindaebang Samgeori, and Sindaebang 1-dong (along today’s Siheung-daero), entering the area of modern Geumcheon District.

Historical records note a bridge called Majangcheon Bridge—formerly over what was then called Majangcheon (now Dorimcheon)—located near the current Guro Industrial Complex subway station. King Jeongjo traveled through this location, passed through Munseonggol (the area around present-day Munseong Elementary School), crossed Siheung Hill (near today's Suchon Cham Balsso), and stayed at the Siheung Prefecture government office. He then proceeded via Baksan (Baksi area) and Yeonbulgyo (near the entrance to Anyang Amusement Park) toward Suwon. Due to its significance during these royal journeys, the local government office at the time held a status similar to a temporary royal residence (haenggung), contributing to the continued usage and formalization of the name Siheung.

== See also ==
- Administrative divisions of South Korea
