= Siheung =

City in Gyeonggi, South Korea

- Municipal City
- Panoramic view of Siheung

- Flag Emblem of Siheung

- Location in South Korea
- Coordinates: 37°22′47″N 126°48′10″E
- Country: South Korea
- Region: Gyeonggi Province (Sudogwon)
- Administrative divisions: 18 dongs

Area
  - Total: 135.79 km^{2} (52.43 sq mi)

Population (july 2025)
  - Total: 514,536
  - Density: 3,355.8/km^{2} (8,691/sq mi)
  - Dialect: Gyeonggi

Korean name
- Hangul: 시흥시
- Hanja: 始興市
- RR: Siheung-si
- MR: Sihŭng-si

Siheung (Korean: 시흥; [ɕi.ɣɯŋ]) is a city in Gyeonggi Province, South Korea. The city has a population of 511,807 people, where 508,646 are residents out of 218,846 households as of August 2021. Siheung acquired its current administrative structure on January 1, 1989, the former Siheung County was divided into the cities of Siheung, Gunpo, and Uiwang. At that time, Siheung had a population of only 93,000. This number more than tripled in the following decade as massive suburban apartment complexes were developed. Siheung's current area formerly belonged to Incheon and Ansan before 1914.

Notable landmarks include the Oido island, the Soraesan mountain, Lotus theme park and the port and inlet of Wolgot. Siheung includes two new areas that were developed in the 1990s, Sihwa and Wolgot. The new city of Sihwa includes a very large industrial complex. Companies headquartered there include Hansung Machinery Co., Korea Polytechnic University (established in 1997), and also Kyonggi Institute of Technology (reorganized in 1999).

In 2007, Korea Polytechnic University built TIP (Techno Innovation Park). The building has 18 floors used for studying, research, and development for students, faculty, companies and government. In February 2010, Seoul National University acquired 826 thousand square-meters or 204 acres of Siheung property to establish its global campus. The university plans to build a biomedical complex, research hospital, apartments, and education-related infrastructure including lecture halls, dormitories, and an international middle and high school.

== History ==
In the early Three Kingdoms period, the Siheung area was part of the Baekje kingdom. It was lost to Goguryeo along with the Han River Valley in 475.

== Administrative districts ==
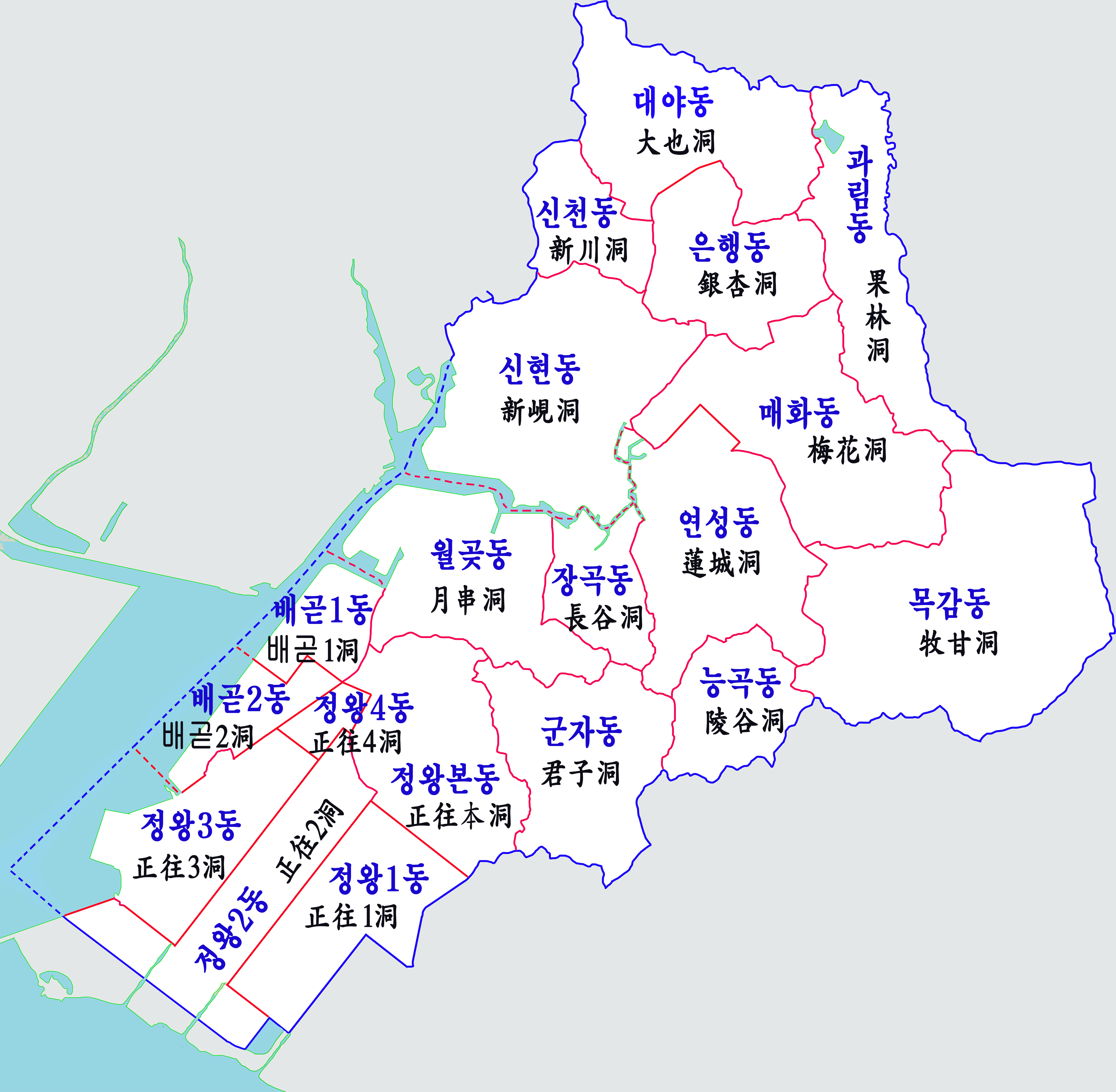
Neighbourhoods of Siheung

Siheung is divided into 18 dongs.

Administrative dong	Korean name	Area (km^{2})	Population	Household
Daeya-dong	대야동	9.85	42,116	12.860
Sincheon-dong	신천동	3.44	33.359	17,898
Sinhyun-dong	신현동	12.64	9,139	4,396
Eunheng-dong	은행동	5.96	54,575	15,278
Maehwa-dong	매화동	11.20	11,356	5,133
Mokgam-dong	목감동	17.57	40,971	15,795
Gunja-dong	군자동	16.69	21,775	9,738
Wolgot-dong	월곶동	8.53	17,385	6,859
Jeongwangbon-dong	정왕본동	8.83	18,122	14,016
Jeongwang 1-dong	정왕1동	6.55	21,226	13,085
Jeongwang 2-dong	정왕2동	5.55	27,216	12,516
Jeongwang 3-dong	정왕3동	6.18	21,535	10,881
Jeongwang 4-dong	정왕4동	5.80	19,729	7,438
Baegot-dong	배곧동	4.97	68,084	25,421
Gwarim-dong	과림동	7.65	1,796	1,247
Yeonseong-dong	연성동	10.05	23,882	8,283
Janggok-dong	장곡동	3.49	46,728	5.606
Neunggok-dong	능곡동	4.34	26,101	6,946
Total	시흥시	135.79	472,162	186,443

== Climate ==
Siheung has a humid continental climate (Köppen: Dwa), but can be considered a borderline humid subtropical climate (Köppen: Cwa) using the −3 °C (27 °F) isotherm.

Climate data for Siheung (1994–2020 normals)
Month	Jan	Feb	Mar	Apr	May	Jun	Jul	Aug	Sep	Oct	Nov	Dec	Year
Mean daily maximum °C (°F)	2.5 (36.5)	5.2 (41.4)	10.7 (51.3)	17.3 (63.1)	23.0 (73.4)	27.1 (80.8)	29.3 (84.7)	30.5 (86.9)	26.6 (79.9)	20.5 (68.9)	12.4 (54.3)	4.7 (40.5)	17.5 (63.5)
Daily mean °C (°F)	−1.9 (28.6)	0.5 (32.9)	5.6 (42.1)	11.9 (53.4)	17.6 (63.7)	22.1 (71.8)	25.4 (77.7)	26.4 (79.5)	21.7 (71.1)	15.1 (59.2)	7.6 (45.7)	0.3 (32.5)	12.7 (54.9)
Mean daily minimum °C (°F)	−6.2 (20.8)	−3.9 (25.0)	1.0 (33.8)	7.1 (44.8)	12.8 (55.0)	18.1 (64.6)	22.2 (72.0)	23.0 (73.4)	17.5 (63.5)	10.0 (50.0)	3.0 (37.4)	−4.0 (24.8)	8.4 (47.1)
Average precipitation mm (inches)	14.3 (0.56)	22.4 (0.88)	29.6 (1.17)	60.4 (2.38)	78.4 (3.09)	107.0 (4.21)	321.4 (12.65)	254.0 (10.00)	122.4 (4.82)	47.5 (1.87)	46.7 (1.84)	18.5 (0.73)	1,122.6 (44.20)
Average precipitation days (≥ 0.1 mm)	3.6	3.7	4.9	6.8	6.6	7.8	12.4	11.1	7.1	4.9	7.1	5.3	81.3
Source: Korea Meteorological Administration

== Public transportation ==
=== Railroad ===
Siheung has several rail lines sponsored by Korail. Seoul Subway Line 4 runs from the Oido station to the Jeongwang station before proceeding on to Ansan. The Suin line runs through Darwol and Wolgot stations before proceeding to the Namdong District. The Seohae Line was added on June 16, 2018, and will be built to run through the city from the Sosa station to Ansan.

== Industry ==
=== Gross domestic product ===
The total regional production of Siheung in 2012 was 26.888 billion won. It accounted for 3.6% of Gyeonggi Province's GDP. The primary industries of forestry followed by agriculture are low producers, amounting to 41.4 billion won. The secondary industries of mining and manufacturing amounted for 16.24 trillion won, accounting for 64.2%, while the tertiary industries of commercial and service industries accounted for 35.6%, amounting to 9.29 trillion won. Quaternary industries provided the following: wholesale and retail trade (6.6%); construction (4.0%); real estate and leasing (3.3%), and business services (3.2%).

=== Status of employees by industry ===
In 2014, the total number of workers in industries in Siheung was 185,032. This accounts for 4.1% of the total number of employees in the city's province, Gyeonggi. The number of agriculture and forestry fisheries was 17%, which is low. Mining and manufacturing accounted for 48.4%, with 89,554 employees. The commercial and service industry accounted for 95.6%, amounting to 51.6%. Secondary industry was individually higher than it was in Gyeonggi overall (27.1%) and the tertiary industry was lower than Gyeonggi (72.9%). In the tertiary industry, the proportion of housing and food and lodging (7.6%), education (5.2%), and health and social services (4.4%).

== Recreation and tourism ==
- Siheung Lotus Theme Park – The Lotus Theme Park can be visited all-year-round by bikers and pedestrians, but the peak months for seeing the lotus plants in bloom are July and August. It is also the site of a summer festival. Seven varieties of lotus and over thirty varieties of waterlilies are cultivated at the park. Admission to the theme park during the summer months is free, and lotus viewing tours take place from 9:00 a.m. to 2:00 p.m. local time. The theme park can be reached by several city bus routes.
- Siheung Gaetgol Ecological Park – There is a rare inland gaetgol present in the park that is exposed twice a day at low tide. It can also be called a "serpentinized mudflat" because it looks like a snake.
- The Soraesan mountain – Unlike other mountains, Soraesan has a moderate slope, moderate rock climbing, and even a forest path. The Maae-sang of Soraesan, built during the Goryeo Dynasty, is carved on a huge rock in the middle of the mountain and is a major feature of Soraesan. There are various sports facilities, reading forests, and strength-building exercise stations build using wooden ropes. It is 5-kilometers away from the summit to the entrance of the Naewonsa Temple. In addition, the Soamcheon mineral spring and Cheongryong mineral spring provide quality water to visitors to the Soraesan forest bath. On a clear day, the summit overlooks the sea near Seoul.
- Salt fields – It is 136,000 m² (450,000 pyeong) wide. The vividness of barley, the splendor of flowers, and the beautiful ridges of the tidal flats attract many visitors.
- Oido – it is an island on the West Coast region of South Korea's Gyeonggi Province (also known as Gyeonggi-do). Nearby attractions include Oido Paechong (오이도패총) and Okgu Park (옥구공원), and people can experience mud flat experience, boarding experience, and sea fishing.
- Wave Park (웨이브파크) is a water park opened in October 2020. Constructed on 166,000 square meters of land the park consists of the world's largest artificial wave pool for surfing and facilities for enjoying other water sports activities, such as canoeing and scuba diving.

== Sister cities ==
Siheung is a sister city to:

- Dezhou, Shandong, China
- Rochester, Minnesota, United States
- Hachiōji, Kantō, Japan

== Education of Siheung ==
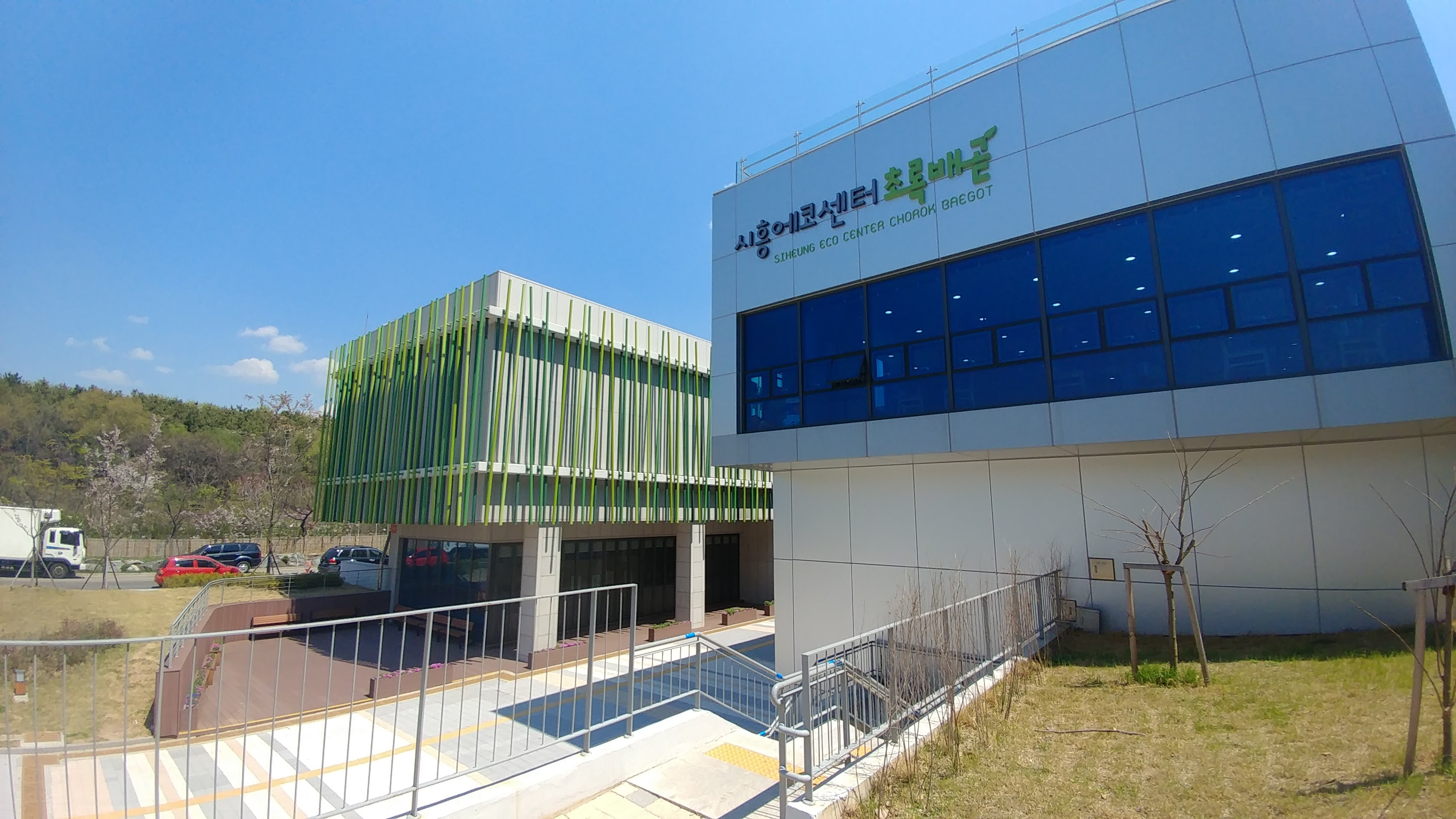
Siheung Eco Business Center

There are unique educational programs of Siheung: one involves achieving an innovative education district—since Siheung is a part of Gyeonggi's Innovative Education District work, it provides many educational programs to the citizens. The city operates the Regional-National Linked Training Conference and has Village Convergence schools. For students, they provide the Siheung Creativity Experience School. Visiting village teachers in primary and secondary schools can attend the Village-linked Creative Education Course (elementary school) and other various programs.

Siheung also has more educational programs linked to the local community: first being the Youth International Exchange Program; Siheung has the From Siheung to the world! Youth Planning Training program in which teenagers plan and prepare schedules for their chosen countries by forming teams on their own and then go abroad for research training; then there is the Siheung Dream Tree, To the world! Overseas Visit Experience program in which children receive prior education through various subjects such as culture and art, history and embark on field trips. The Overseas Visit Experience program is based on the idea that with new friends, teenagers can learn and understand difficult subjects through various self-directed learning methods. Lastly, Siheung has a 'sister school' project, aiming to expand international exchange activities by supporting a partnership project between a school in Siheung and a foreign school. The biggest feature is that low-income families who are unable to get a chance to visit overseas due to financial difficulties are given opportunities to participate in international exchange activities. All hopeful schools in the region receive applications throughout the year.

There are also many educational supporting services including facilities for the youth.

== Notable people from Siheung ==
- Chen, singer-songwriter, member of Exo (born in Daejeon and grew up in Siheung)
- Jay B, singer-songwriter, dancer, actor, and leader of Got7
- Jung Sang-sook, retired para table tennis player and silver medalist at the 2012 Summer Paralympics
- Ki Hyongdo, poet
- Kim Chong-in, economist and politician
- Kim Jinai, urban engineer and politician
- Kim Yong-san, businessman
- KittiB, hip hop artist and runner-up of Unpretty Rapstar 2
- Lee Si-woo, volleyball player
- Moon Jong-up, singer-songwriter, rapper, dancer, model, actor, and former member of B.A.P
- Nam Sang-nam, former swimmer
- Park Seo-ham, actor, singer, rapper, and former member of KNK
- Yi Sun-sin, Korean military official of the mid-Joseon period and a general under Admiral Yi Sun-sin during the Imjin War
- Yoon Chae-kyung, singer, dancer, actress, member of April and former member of Puretty, C.I.V.A and I.B.I (born in Incheon and grew up in Siheung)
- Yunchan Lim, pianist and winner of Sixteenth Van Cliburn International Piano Competition
