= Chongtong =

Type of Korean firearm

- Hangul: 총통
- Hanja: 銃筒
- RR: chongtong
- MR: ch'ongt'ong

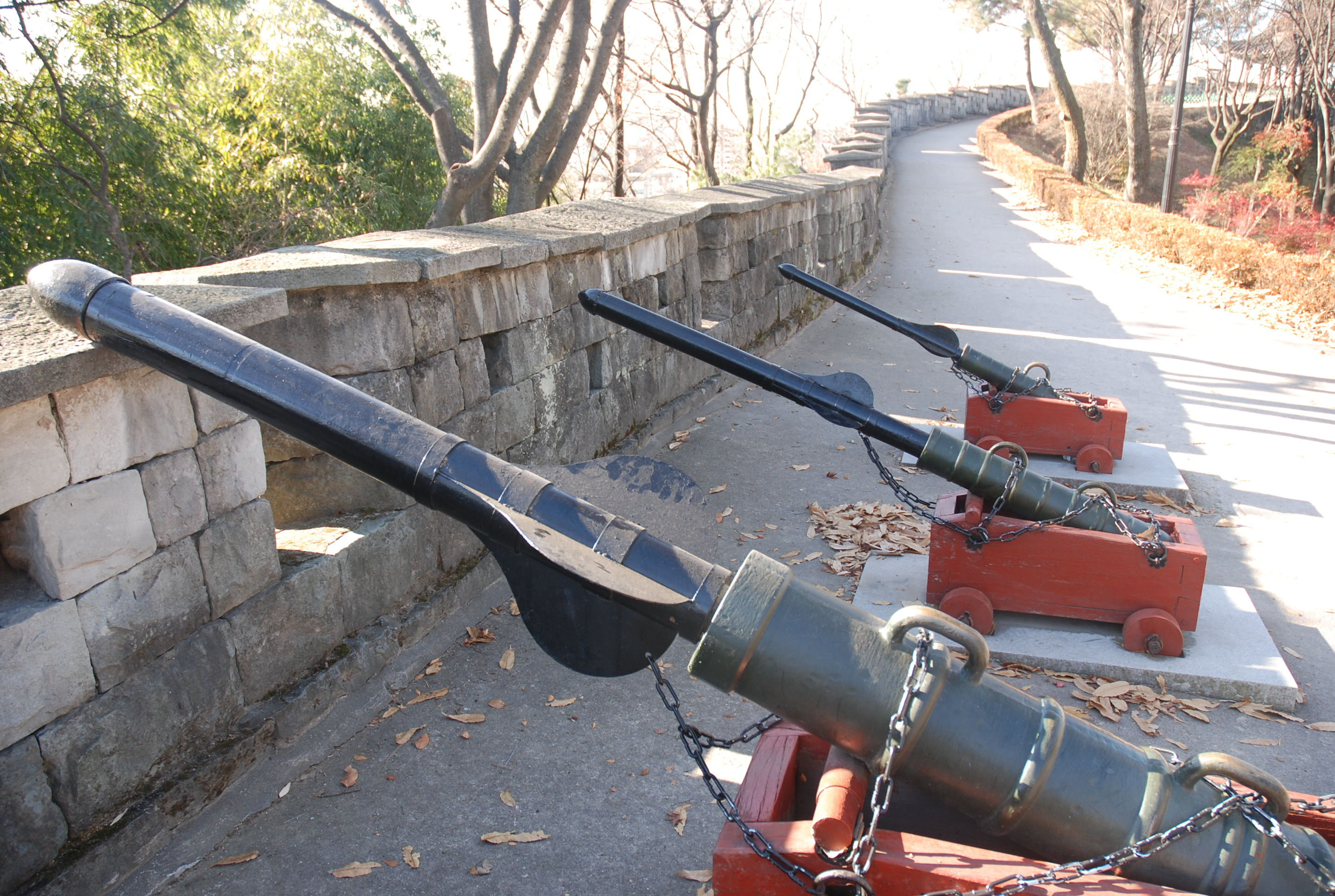
Three of the large chongtong in Jinju Fortress. The closest is a "Cheonja", the second is a "Jija", and the third is a "Hyeonja".

Chongtong (Korean: 총통; Hanja: 銃筒) is a term for military firearms of the Goryeo and Joseon dynasties. Chongtong varied in size from hand cannons to large cannons. There were three generations of chongtong. The well-known cheonja, jija, hyeonja, and hwangja were named after the first four characters of the Thousand Character Classic in decreasing size, thus making them equivalent to Cannons A, B, C, and D.

== History ==
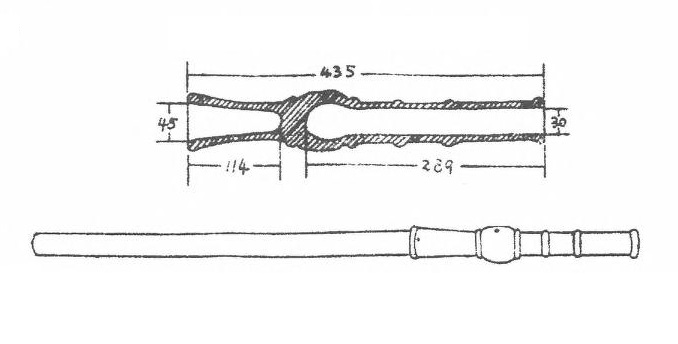
Yuan dynasty hand cannon of 1351 AD.

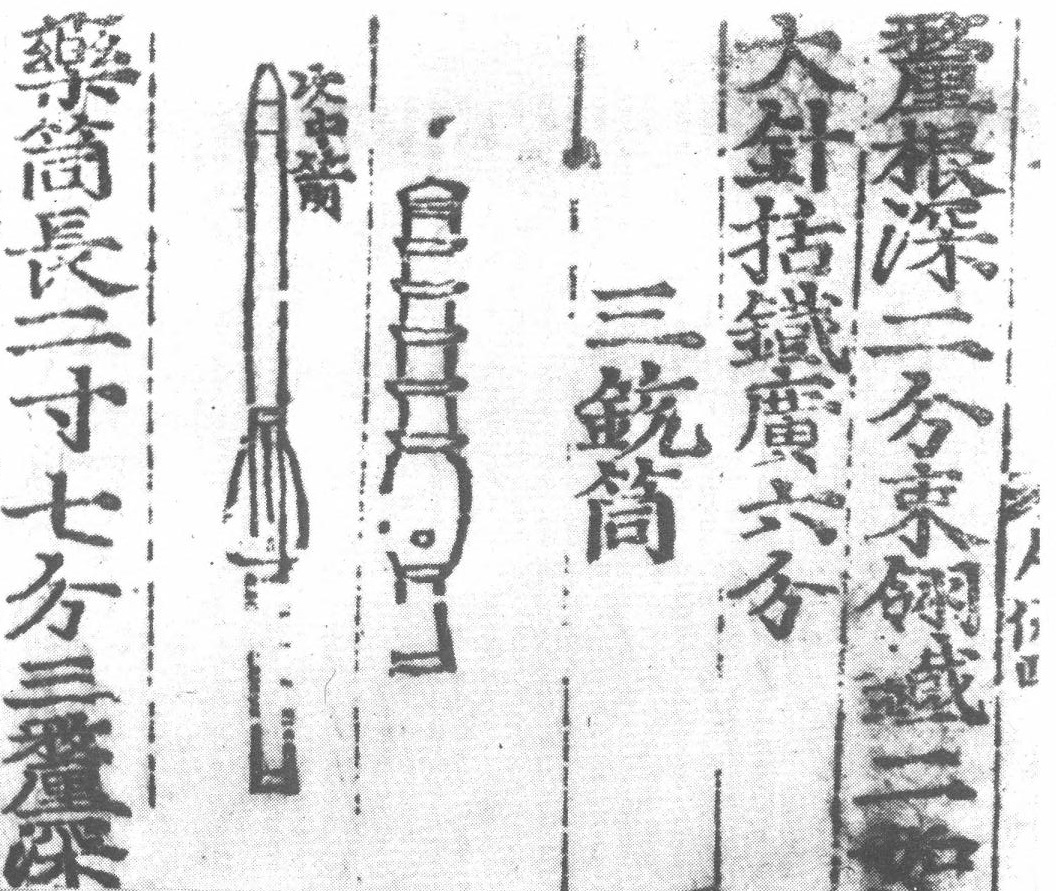
A page of the Korean Kukcho Orye-ui (ca. 1474) showing an early type of hand cannon (chhung thung or chongtong) and the bolt-like arrow and metal fins which was shot from it.

Gunpowder first came to Korea in the mid-14th century. From 1356 onwards, Korea was much harassed by wokou, and the king of Goryeo, Kongmin Wang, sent an envoy to the court of Ming China appealing for a supply of firearms. Although China at that time was under Yuan dynasty, the first Ming leader, the Hongwu Emperor, seems to have treated the request kindly and responded in some measure. The Goryeosa mentions a certain type of bombard, the chongtong, which could send arrows from the Nam-kang hill to the south of the Sun-ch’on Sa temple with such force and velocity that they would penetrate completely into the ground together with their fins. In circa 1372, Li Khang (or Li Yuan), a saltpetre expert, perhaps a merchant, came from South China to Korea, and he was befriended by the courtier Choi Muson. He asked him confidentially about the secrets of his craft and sent several of his retainers to learn from him. Choi became the first Korean to manufacture gunpowder and gun barrels, all depending on Li Khang's transmission. A royal inspection of a new fleet happened in 1373 including tests of guns with larger barrels for shooting incendiary arrows against the pirate ships.

In 1373, a new mission, led by Sang Sa-on, was sent to the Chinese capital to ask for urgent supplies of gunpowder. The Koreans had built special ships to repel the wokou, which needed gunpowder for their cannon. In the following year, another request was made to the Ming emperor after the military camps at Happo were set ablaze by wokou, with over 5000 casualties. At first, Thai Tsu was reluctant to supply powder and arms to the Koreans, but in the middle of 1374 he changed his mind, he also sent military officers to inspect the ships built by the Koreans. The Goryeosa records the first systematic manufacture of hand cannons and bombards in Korea in ca. 1377, saying that the arsenal was directed by a "Firebarrel Superintendent".

Improvements were made during the reign of Taejong of Joseon, and in the 1440s, Sejong the Great made even more.

Earlier in the century, the bullanggi, a breech-loading swivel gun was introduced from Portugal via China.

In 1596, more improvements were made, and by this time (i.e., on the dawn of the Imjin War), the Seungja class of hand cannons were phased out in favor of Japanese-style muskets and arquebuses. The Koreans called these jochong (Korean: 조총/鳥銃).

During the 1650s, Hendrick Hamel and others were shipwrecked on Jejudo, introducing a Dutch cannon the Koreans called the hong'ipo, which was used alongside the native Korean cannons.

They were finally discontinued in the late 19th century when Joseon abolished the old-style army in favor of an army based on contemporary Western militaries.

== Cannons ==
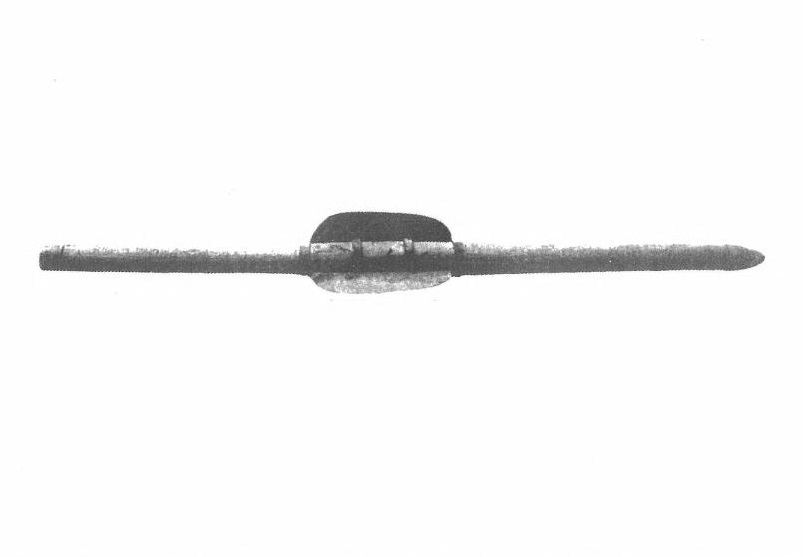
Arrow of the same kind of the one above but larger, over 9 ft (2.7 m) long, with metal head and fins, shot from a similar type of gun. Seoul Museum.

=== Cheonja-Chongtong ===
The 'Sky' or 'Heaven' (천자총통; 天字銃筒) type cannon was the largest of the chongtong. Its length was about 1.3 m (4 ft 3 in) and the bore was about 13 cm (5.1 in). One of the projectiles it fired was a 30 kg (66 lb) 'daejanggunjeon', a large rocket-shaped arrow with an iron head and four fins. Using the daejanggunjeon, the Cheonja-Chongtong had a range of up to 2.4 km.

=== Jija-Chongtong ===
The 'Earth' (지자총통; 地字銃筒) cannon was a little smaller, about 1 m (3 ft 3 in) long with a bore of about 10 cm (3.9 in). It could fire a 16.5 kg (36 lb) 'janggunjeon' (similar to the daejanggunjeon, only smaller) about 1 km (0.62 mi).

=== Hyeonja-Chongtong ===
The 'Black' (현자총통; 玄字銃筒) type was about 0.8 m (2 ft 7 in) long with a bore of about 8 cm (3.1 in) and could fire a 'chadajeon' (similar to the janggunjeon) that weighed about 3.5 kg (7.7 lb) up to about 1 to 2 km (0.62 to 1.24 mi).

=== Hwangja-Chongtong ===
The 'Yellow' (황자총통; 黃字銃筒) was the smallest of the cannons. It resembled the European hand-cannon. Its bore was about 5 cm (2.0 in) and shot a large arrow (similar to the chadaejeon) that weighed about 1.5 kg (3.3 lb) or four ordinary arrows at once which had a range of about 730 m (2,400 ft).

== Handheld guns ==
=== Go-Chongtong ===
In 1377 during the Goryeo Dynasty, a medieval Korean chemist, inventor, and military general named Ch'oe Musŏn created the country's first hand cannon.

=== Se-Chongtong ===
In 1432, the Joseon dynasty under the reign of Sejong the Great introduced a handgun named sae-chongtong (세총통). Initially, Joseon considered the gun as a failed project due to its short effective range, but the weapon quickly proved to be effective in the frontier provinces, starting in June 1437. It was used by both soldiers of different units and civilians, including women and children, as a personal defense weapon. The gun was notably used by chetamja (체탐자, special reconnaissance), whose mission was to infiltrate enemy territory, and by carabiniers carrying multiple guns (a fact made possible by their compact size).

=== Seungja-Chongtong ===
The 'Victor' (승자총통; 勝者銃筒) fired various small projectiles like pellets, bullets, arrows, arrows with war head, etc.

== Gallery ==
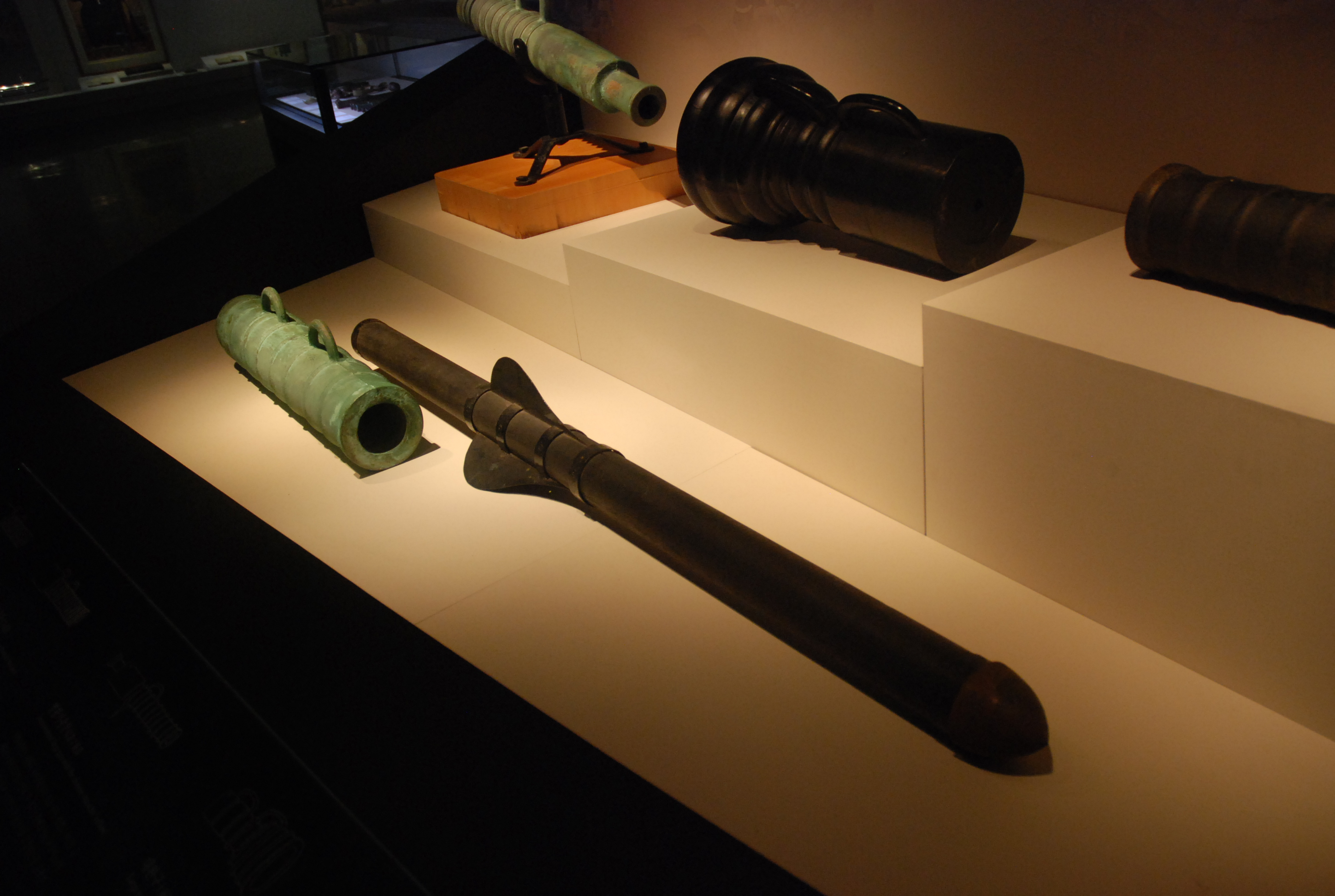
This Cheonja-chongtong is the largest size.

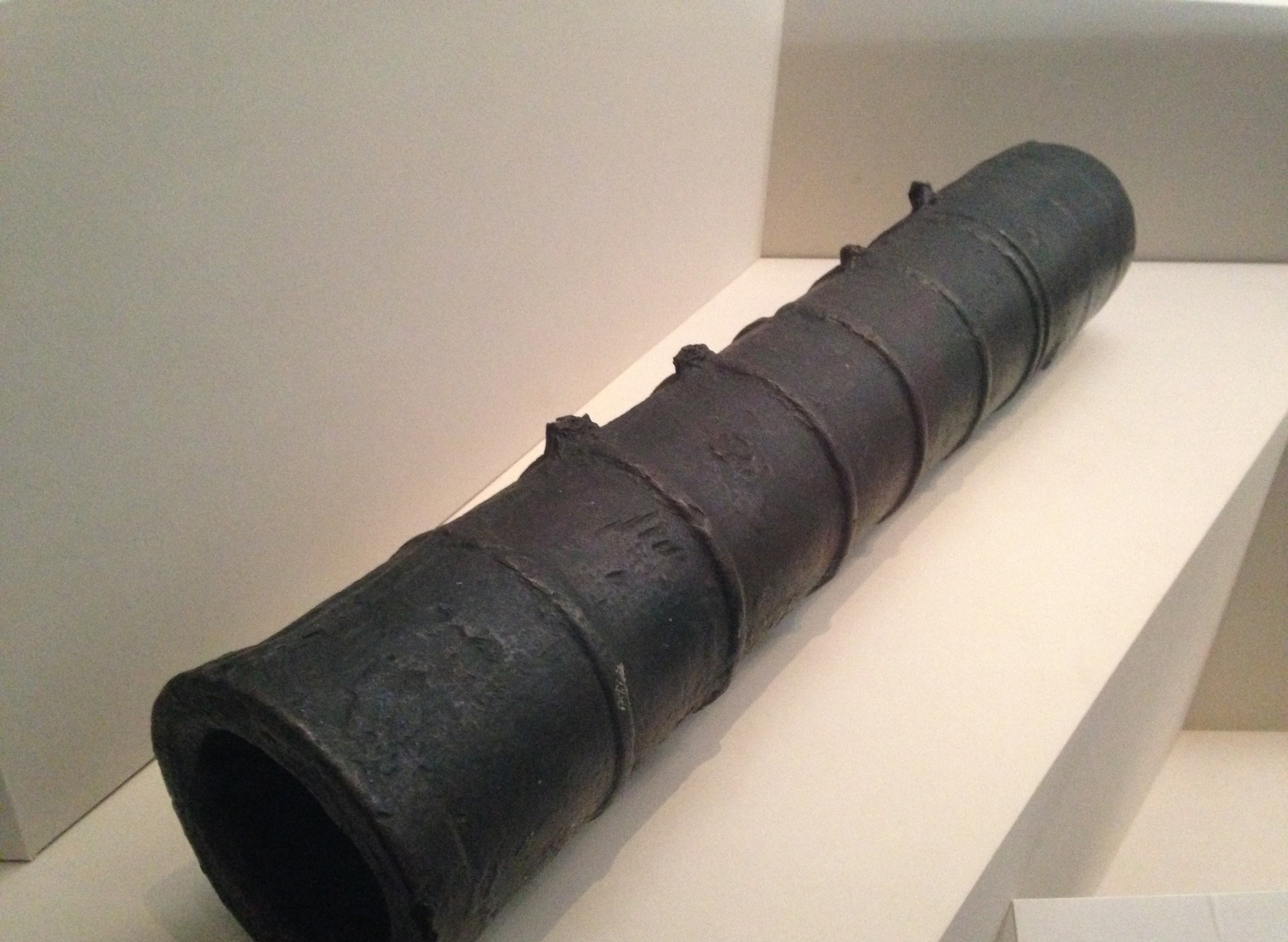
A jija-chongtong.

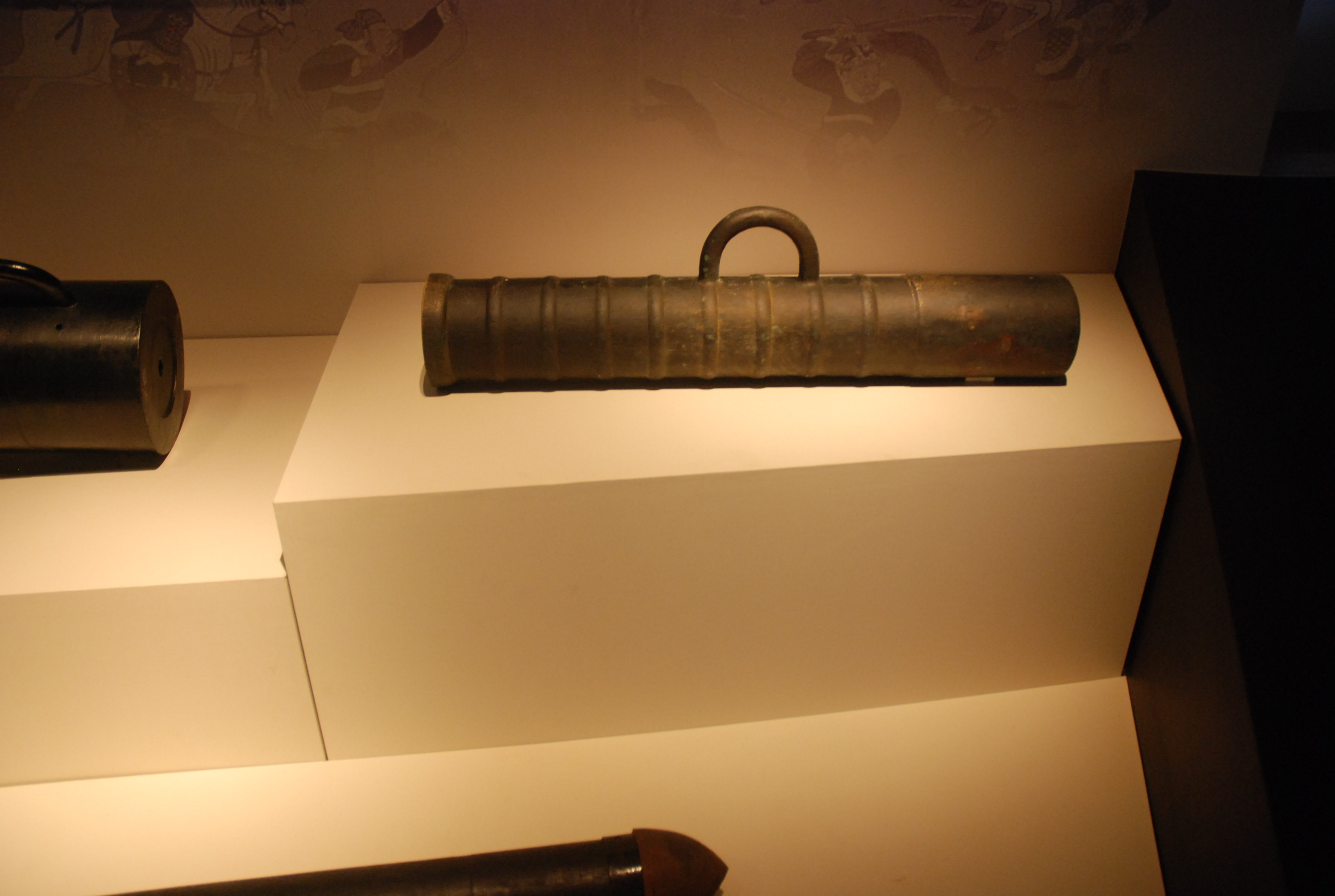
This Hyeonja-chongtong is middle sized cannon.

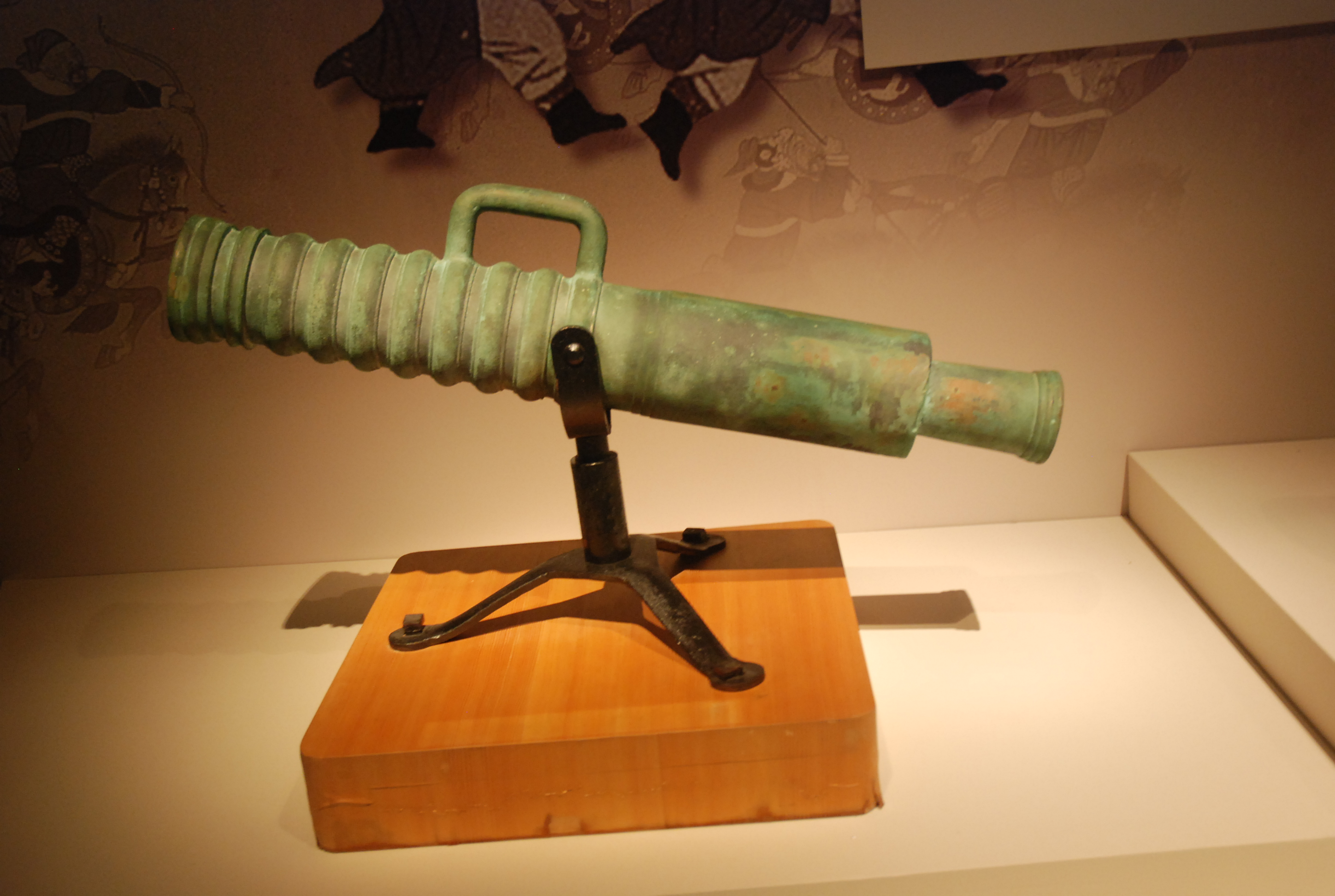
Byeolhwangja-chongtong, which was one of the smaller cannons.

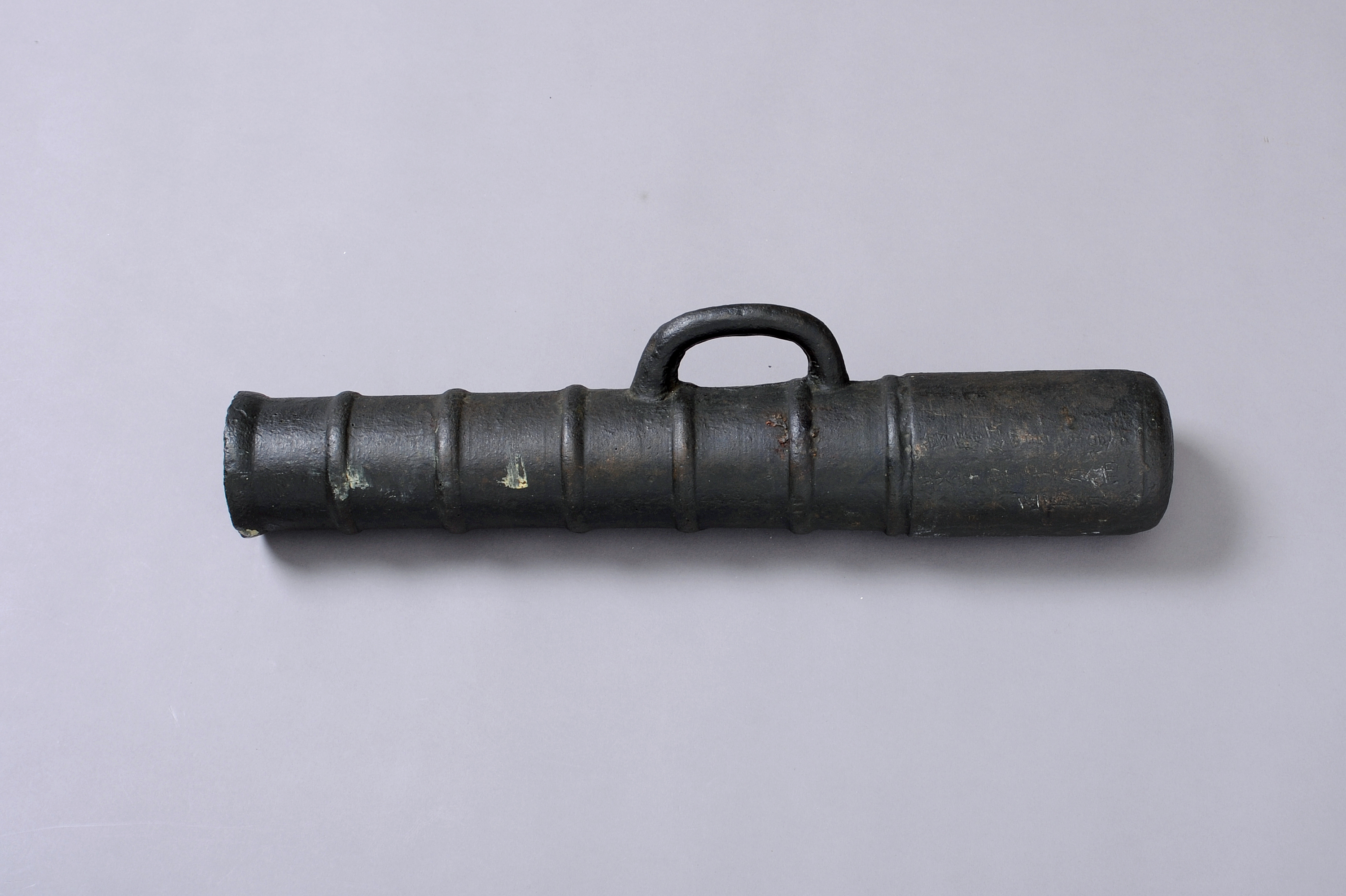
A Hwangja-chongtong.

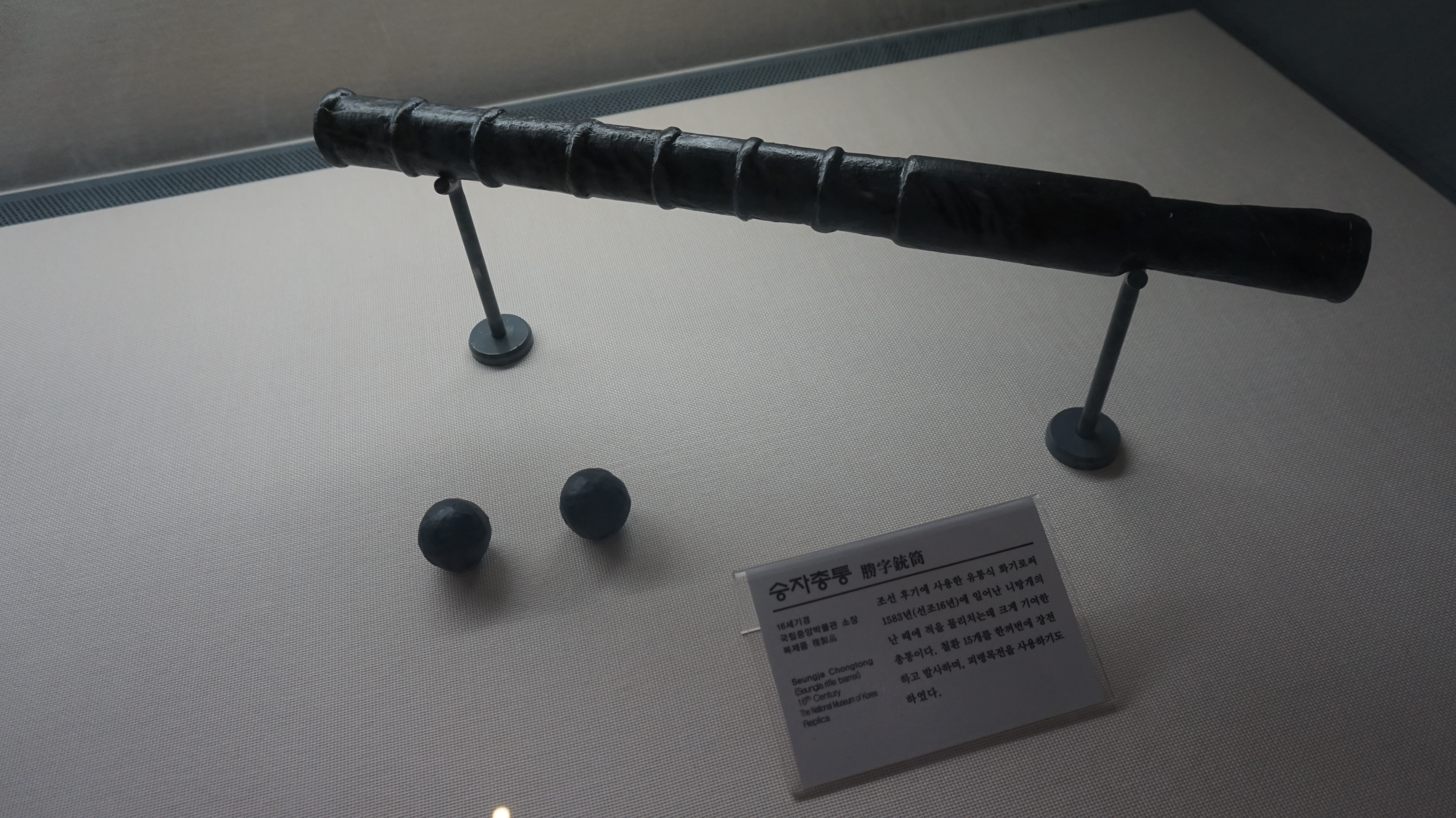
Seungja-chongtong, a hand cannon.

== Other firearms used by Koreans in the 16th century ==
- Samchongtong
- Chongtongwan-gu
- Janggunhwatong
- Ilchongtong
- Yichongtong
- Paljeonchongtong
- Sajeonchongtong
- Bullanggi (breech-loading swivel gun introduced from Europe via China)
- Wan-gu mortars
- Baekjachong

== Similar weapons ==
- Cetbang, Javanese cannon adapted from the Yuan guns
- Bo-hiya, Japanese rocket
- Huochong, Chinese hand cannon
- Bedil tombak, Nusantaran hand cannon

== See also ==
- List of artillery
- Korean cannon
- Hwacha
- Hongyipao
- Singijeon
