= Korean cannon =

Korean weaponry

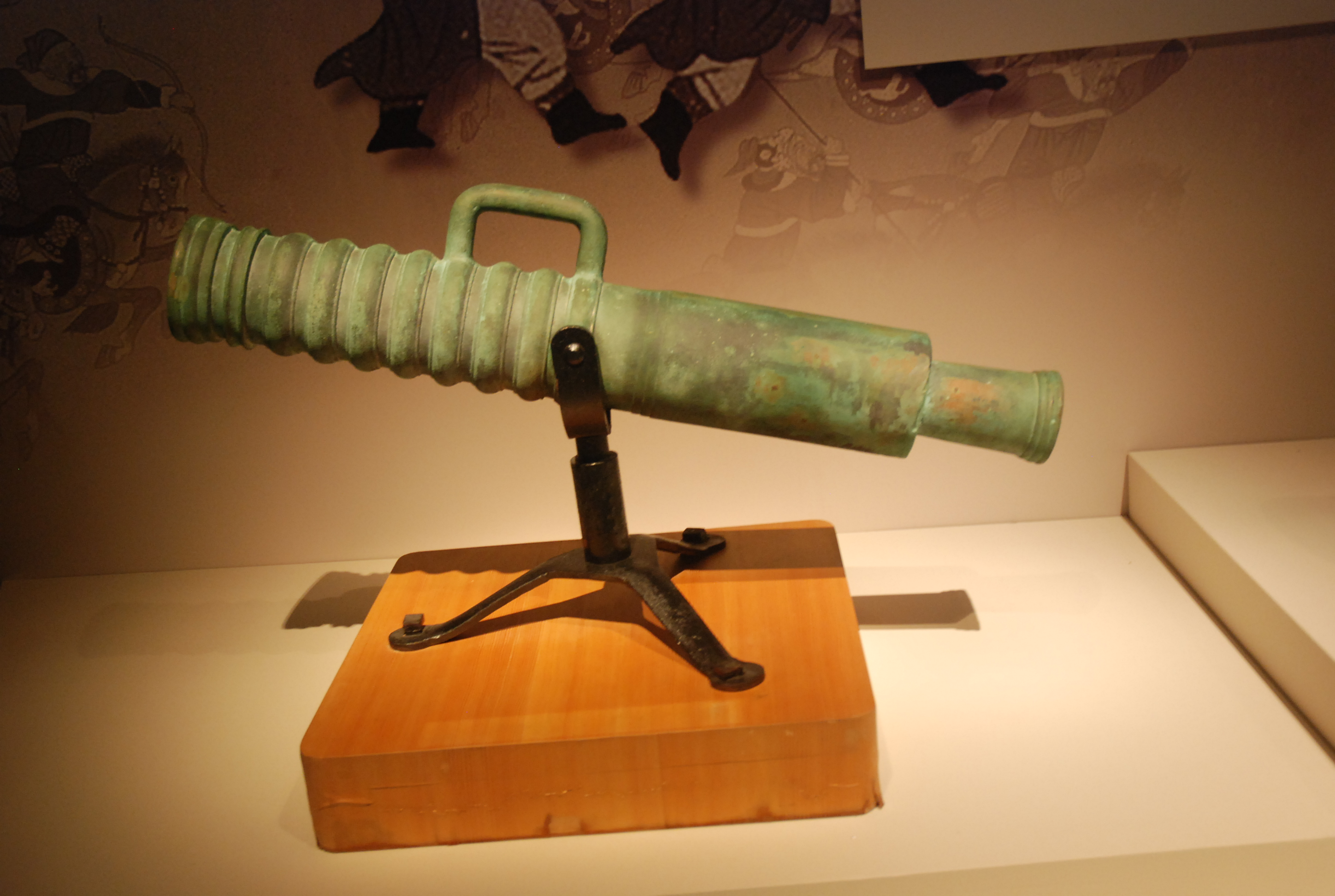
The Byeol-hwangja-chongtong was one of the smaller cannons. It usually had trunnions and a mounting spike to be used on carts or ships' gunwales. It was used during the Imjin War in the 1590s.

Cannons appeared in Korea by the mid 14th century during the Goryeo dynasty and quickly proliferated as naval and fortress-defense weapons. Major developments occurred throughout the 15th century, including the introduction of large siege mortars as well as major improvements that drastically increased range, power, and accuracy.

The Imjin War in the 1590s marked the beginning of a Korean military revolution which saw improvements in cannon design and the introduction and adaptation of foreign-based firearms. This included the en masse adoption of muskets and the adoption of volley fire and rigorous drill techniques. Breech-loading swivel guns were particularly popular as light anti-personnel artillery.

In the early 17th century, a Culverin called Hongyipao was introduced and used until the 19th century.

With the rising threat of European powers in the 19th century, the Joseon dynasty made attempts at reverse-engineering European firearms but eventually had to simply buy them from foreign entities.

== Early history ==
The earliest possible references to firearms in Korea is to what might have been gunpowder-ignited flamethrowers in 1104 and explosive bombs in 1135. The next reference is to a cannon which fired large arrows being tested for use on the northwestern frontier in 1356.

In 1373, King Gongmin visited a new fleet which was being constructed for use against the Wokou, including the firing of cannon. He then requested a shipment of cannon, gunpowder, and gunpowder ingredients from Ming, which was granted the following year.

However, these weapons were not produced locally and had to be secured from elsewhere.

Ch'oe Mu-sŏn, a minor military official, managed to learn the methods of potassium nitrate purification from a visiting Chinese saltpeter merchant. After petitioning the court for several years, the Firearms Directorate was established in 1377 to oversee firearms production and development.

A fleet of ships was trained in cannon use in 1378 and in 1380 saw its first use defeating a Wokou pirate near the mouth of the Geum River. Three years later in 1383 the Korean navy again defeated the Wokou with cannon.

By 1395, a number of weapons were in use: a series of cannons called the daejanggunpo, ijanggunpo, and samjanggunpo, a shell-firing mortar called the jillyeopo, series of yuhwa, juhwa, and chokcheonhwa rockets, which were the forerunners of the singijeon, and a signal gun called the shinpo.

In 1410, Korea had 160 ships equipped with gunpowder artillery.

== Joseon era cannons ==
=== Early Joseon (early to mid 15th century) ===
During Taejong's rule, improvements were made. Among the people responsible for the developments was Ch'oe Hae-san, the son of the aforementioned Ch'oe Mu-sŏn. The cheon "heaven" or "sky", ji "earth", hyeon "black", and hwang "yellow" or "gold" names are not significant, being the first four characters of the Thousand Character Classic, thus making them equivalent to Cannons A, B, C, and D. The following is a list some of the main cannons (called hwapo "fire gourd") of this time period:

- The cheonja-hwapo "heaven" or "sky" (천자화포/天字火砲), with a maximum range of about 500–620 m (1,640–2,030 ft) (400-500 bo).
- The jija-hwapo "earth" (지자화포/地字火砲), with a maximum range of about 620 m (2,030 ft) (500 bo) with an arrow or dart.
- The hyeonja-hwapo "black" (현자화포/玄字火砲), with a maximum range of about 620 m (2,030 ft) (500 bo) with an arrow or dart.
- The hwangja-hwapo "yellow" or "gold" (황자화포/黃字火砲), with a maximum range of about 620 m (2,030 ft) (500 bo).
- The gaja-hwapo (가자화포/架子火砲), with a maximum range of about 250–370 m (820–1,210 ft) (200-300 bo).
- The se-hwapo "slender" or "small" (세화포/細火砲), with a maximum range of about 250 m (820 ft) (200 bo). This was a very small hand-cannon which functioned as a pistol or a cavalry weapon.

Written records for cannons of this era come from the Veritable Records of the Joseon Dynasty .

=== Early Mid Joseon (mid 15th century to mid 16th century) ===
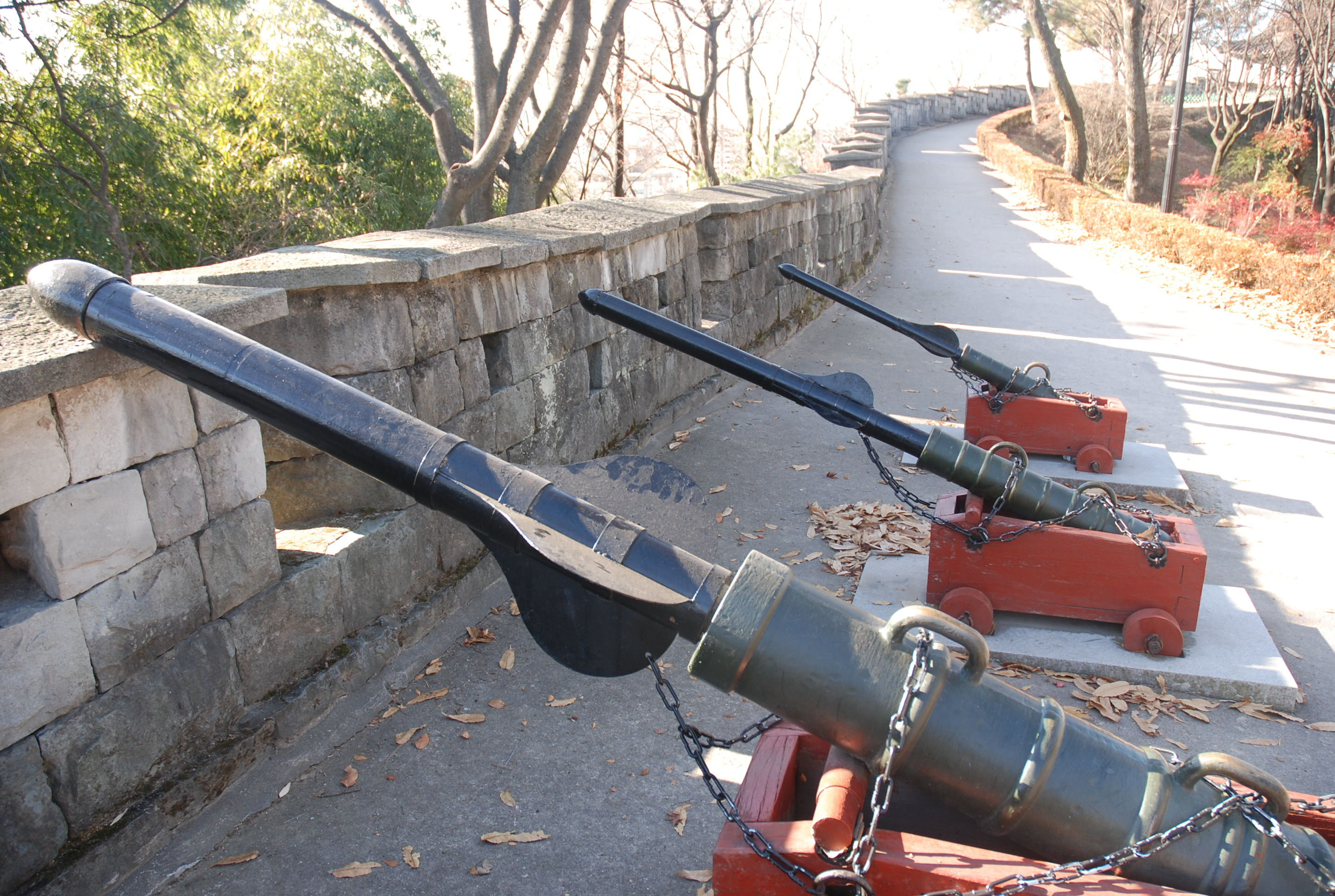
Three large chongtong at the Jinju Fortress museum. The closest is a cheonja-chongtong, the second is a jija-chongtong, and the third is a hyeonja-chongtong. The cannon is equipped with a large arrow, Daejanggunjeon(대장군전/大將軍箭).

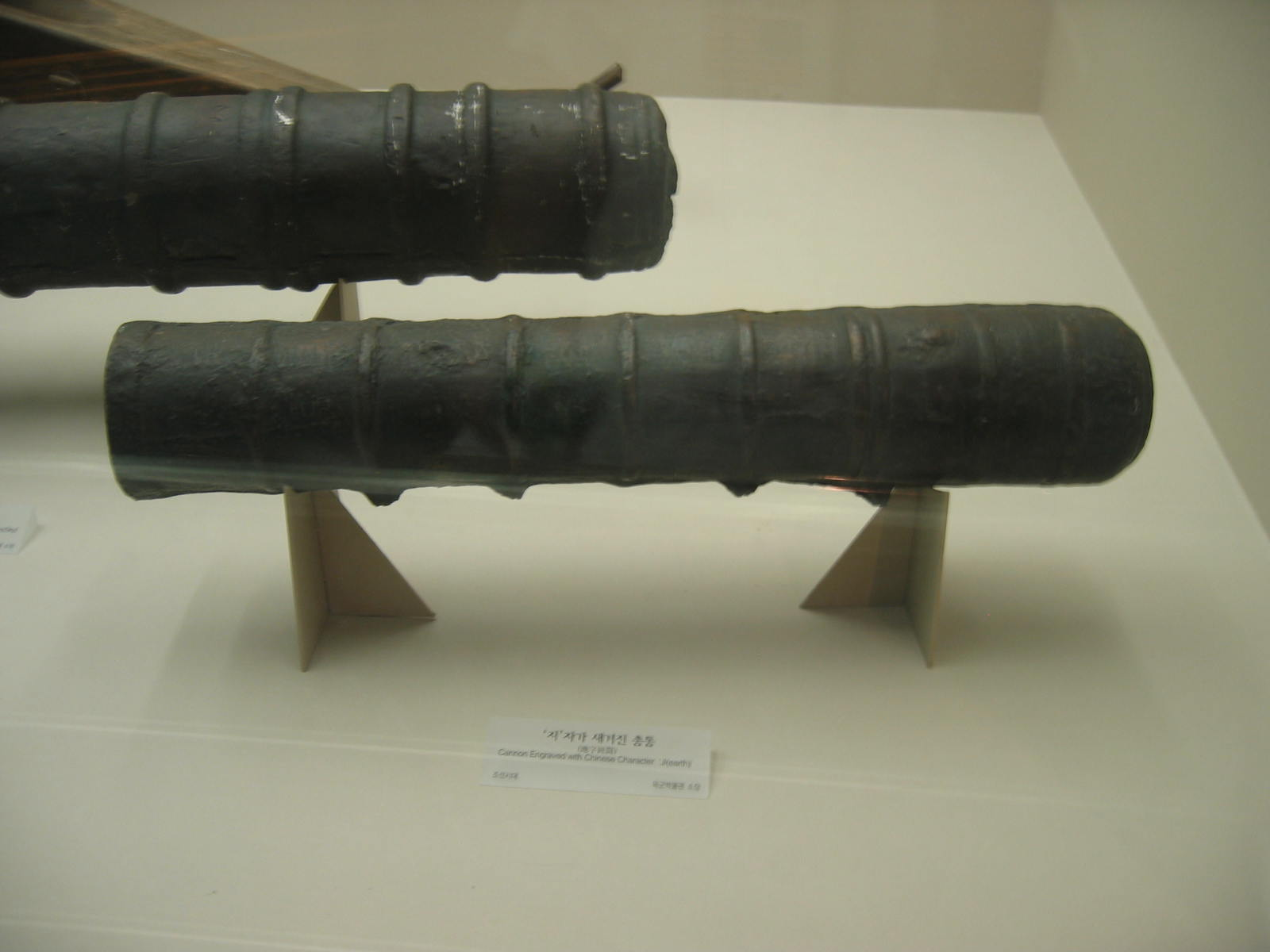
Joseon navy cannons.

The small-but-powerful cannons of this era saw extensive use during the Japanese invasions of Korea (1592–98), by both the Joseon Army and the Navy. They were very effective against the weaker-built Japanese ships.

Sejong made many improvements, and increased the ranges of these cannons (called hwapo and later hwatong "fire tube" and chongtong "gun tube"):

- The cheonja-hwapo (천자화포/天字火砲), with a maximum range of about 1,610 m (5,280 ft) (1300 bo) with an arrow or dart, and about 1,240 m (4,070 ft) (1000 bo) with four arrows or darts, with less powder. This later came to be called the janggun-hwatong "general fire tube" (장군화통).
- The jija-hwapo (지자화포/地字火砲), with a maximum range of about 990–1,120 m (3,250–3,670 ft) (800-900 bo) with an arrow or dart, and about 740–870 m (2,430–2,850 ft) (600-700 bo) with four arrows or darts, with equal powder. Later called the il-chongtong "first chongtong" (일총통).
- The hyeonja-hwapo (현자화포/玄字火砲) is not mentioned among the improved cannons. This was later called the i-chongtong "second chongtong" (이총통).
- The hwangja-hwapo (황자화포/黃字火砲), with a maximum range of about 990 m (3,250 ft) (800 bo) with an arrow or dart, and about 620 m (2,030 ft) (500 bo) with four arrows or darts with equal powder. This was later called the sam-chongtong "third chongtong" (삼총통).
- The gaja-hwapo (가자화포/架子火砲), with a maximum range of about 740 m (2,430 ft) (600 bo) with an arrow or dart, and about 500 m (1,600 ft) (400 bo) with four arrows or darts with equal powder.
- The se-hwapo (세화포/細火砲), with a maximum range of about 740 m (2,430 ft) (600 bo) with an arrow or dart with equal powder. This gun was about 13.8 cm (5.4 in) long and had a bore of about 9 mm (0.35 in). It was later called the se-chongtong (세총통/細銃筒).

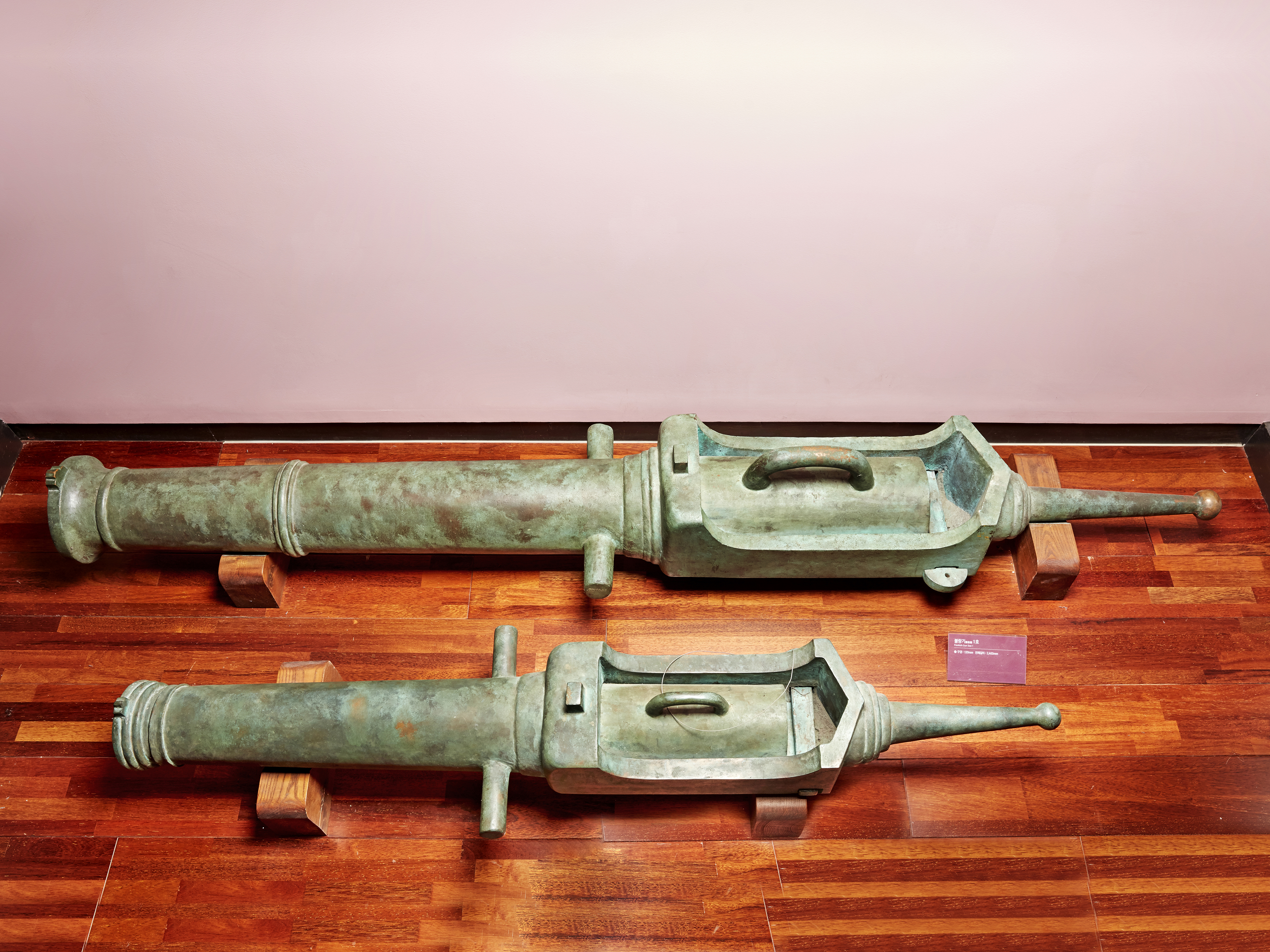
bullanggi

In the early 1500s, the bullanggi (불랑기/佛狼機), a breech-loading swivel gun, was introduced to Korea from Portugal via China. It was divided into sizes 1 through 5, in decreasing size. There was also a mortar of this period called the chongtong-wan'gu.

Written records of these cannons come from the Veritable Records of the Joseon Dynasty and the Gukjo Orye Seorye (Korean: 국조오례서례; Hanja: 國朝五禮序例), published in 1474.

=== Late Mid Joseon (late 16th century to late 18th century) ===
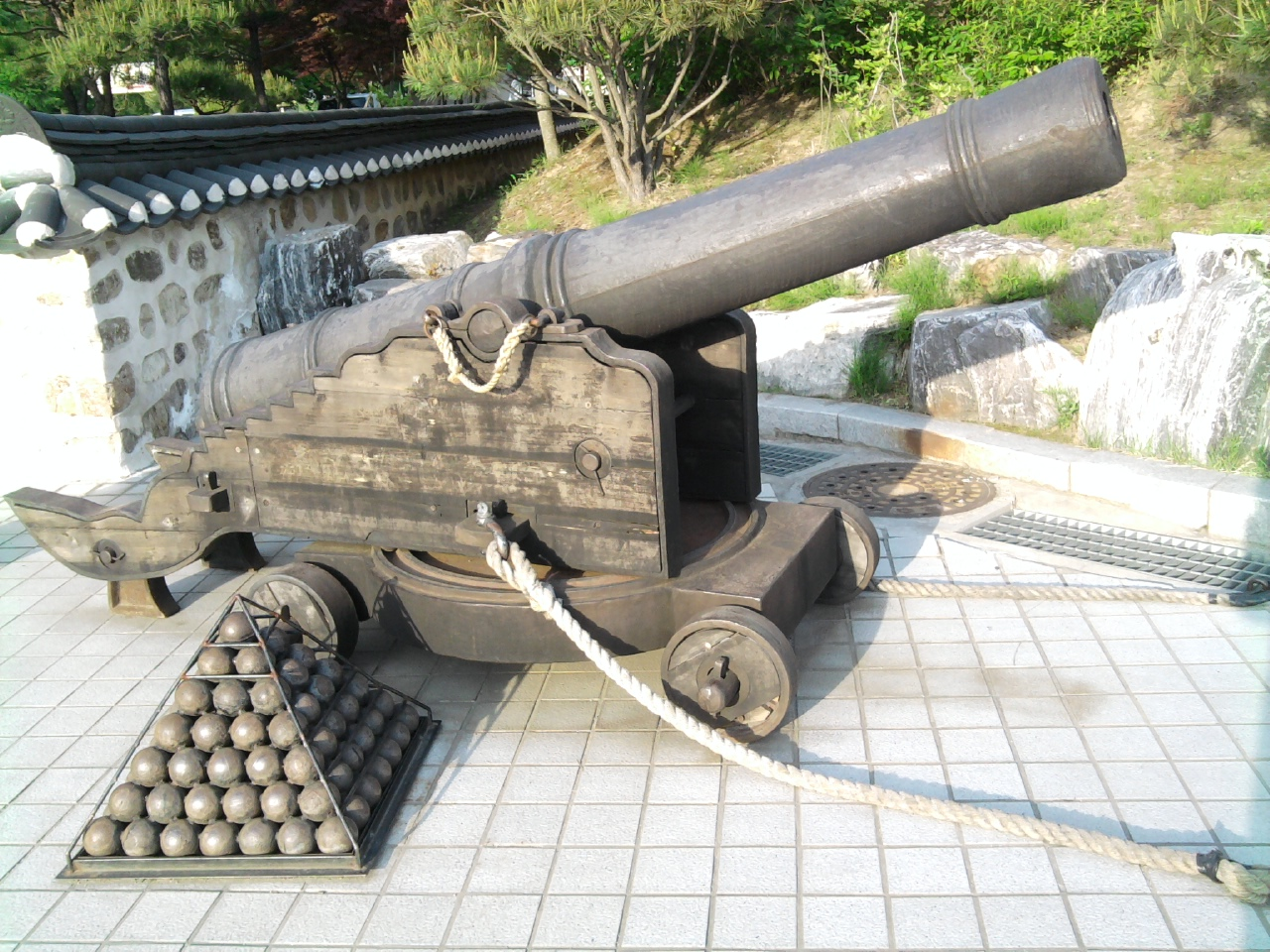
Hongyipao

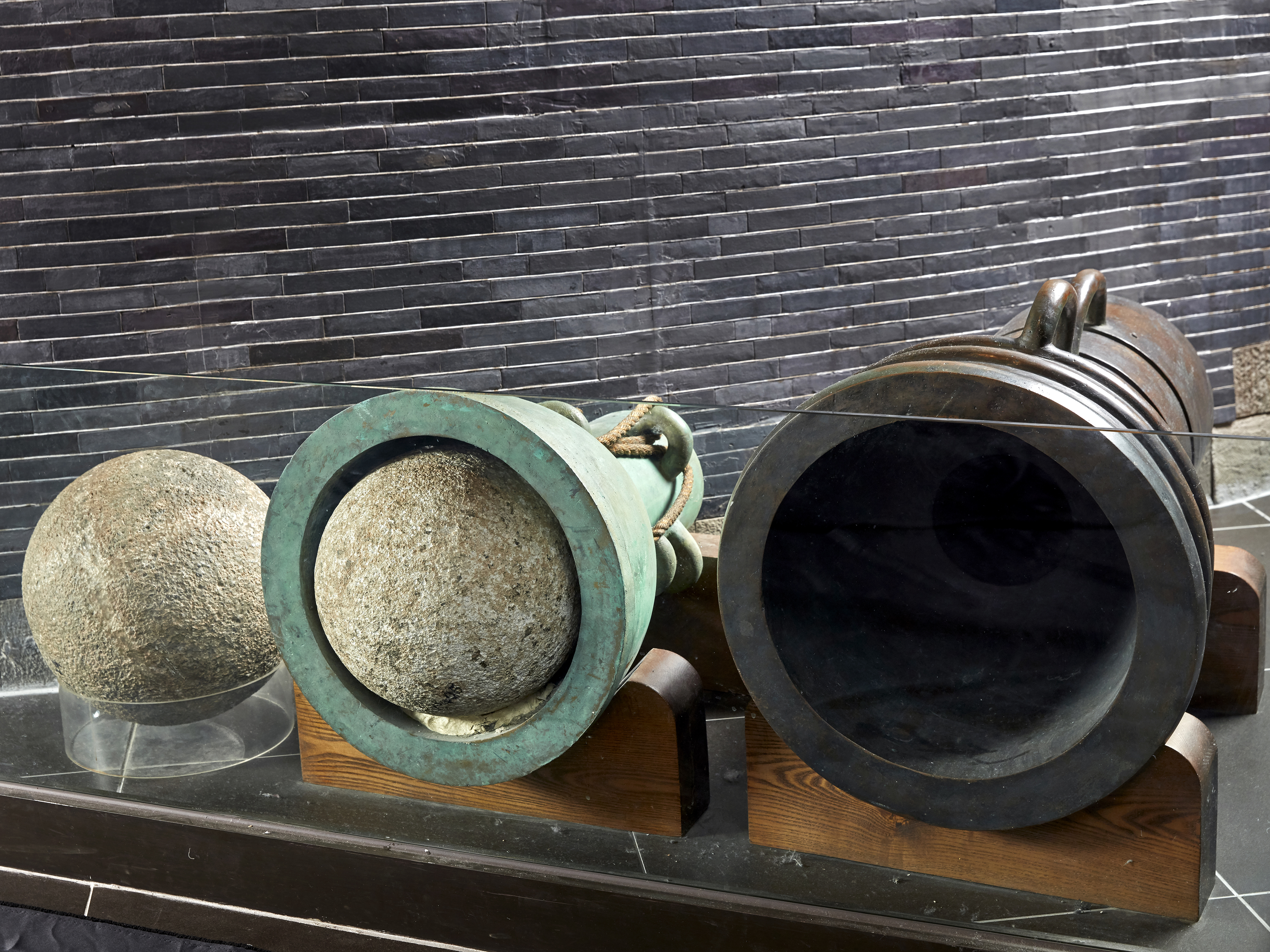
Byeoldae-wan'gu

Improvements were made on the earlier designs. The following is a list of some of the cannons:

- cheonja-chongtong (천자총통/天字銃筒)
- jija-chongtong (지자총통/地字銃筒)
- hyeonja-chongtong (현자총통/玄字銃筒)
- hwangja-chongtong (황자총통/黃字銃筒)
- byeorhwangja-chongtong (별황자총통)
- The Hong'ipo (Korean: 홍이포; Hanja: 紅夷砲) Hongi cannon was introduced to Joseon in 1630 when an envoy dispatched to the Ming Dynasty brought a set and samples of cannons. And during the Byeongja Horan Namhansanseong Fortress was attacked by the Qing Dynasty, which brought Hongipo from the Ming Dynasty. Later, in the 1650s, it began to be produced in earnest by the Dutchmen Hendrick Hamel and Jan Jansz Weltevree. It was used during the 1866 French campaign against Korea, the 1871 United States expedition to Korea and the Ganghwa Island incident of September 20, 1875.

Mortars used during this period:

- Byeoldae-wan'gu (별대완구)
- Dae-wan'gu (대완구/大碗口)
- Jung-wan'gu (중완구/中碗口)

Written records for this period are the Shin'gi Bigyeol (신기비결) in 1603, Hwagi Dogam Uigye (화기도감의궤) in 1615, and Hwaposhik Eonhae (화포식언해) in 1635.

=== Late Joseon (Late Mid 19th century) ===
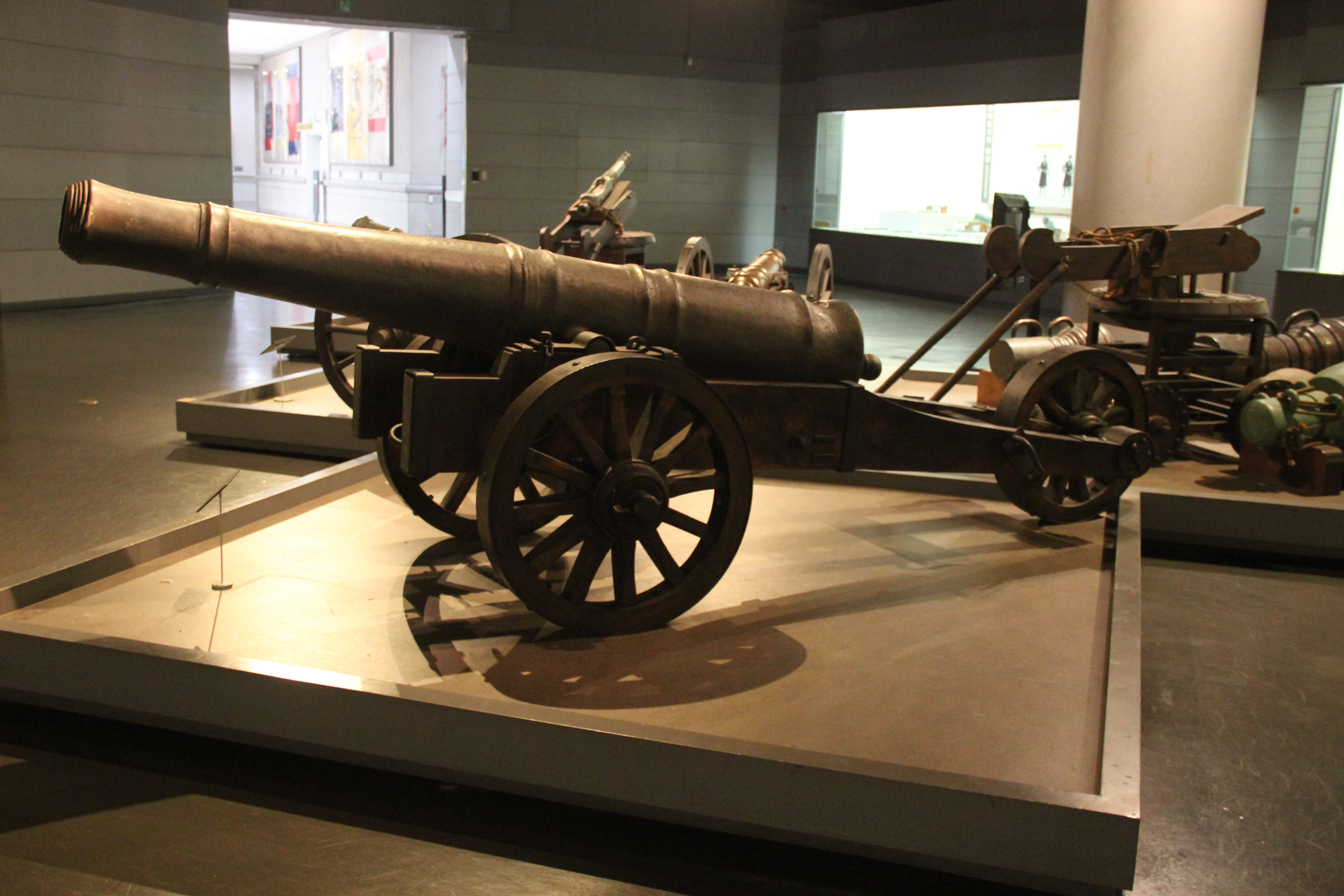
Daepo

Written records from this time period come from the Yungwon Pilbi (융원필비) in 1813 and the Hun'guk Shinjo Gun'gi Doseol (훈국신조군기도설) in 1867.

- Hong'ipo
- bullanggi
- Daepo was a bronze muzzle-loading cannon made in 1874 100 mm (3.9 in)
- Jungpo was a bronze muzzle-loading cannon made in 1874 with a caliber of 120 mm (4.7 in).
- Sopo was a bronze muzzle-loading cannon made in 1874 with a caliber of 84 mm (3.3 in).

== Operation and projectiles ==
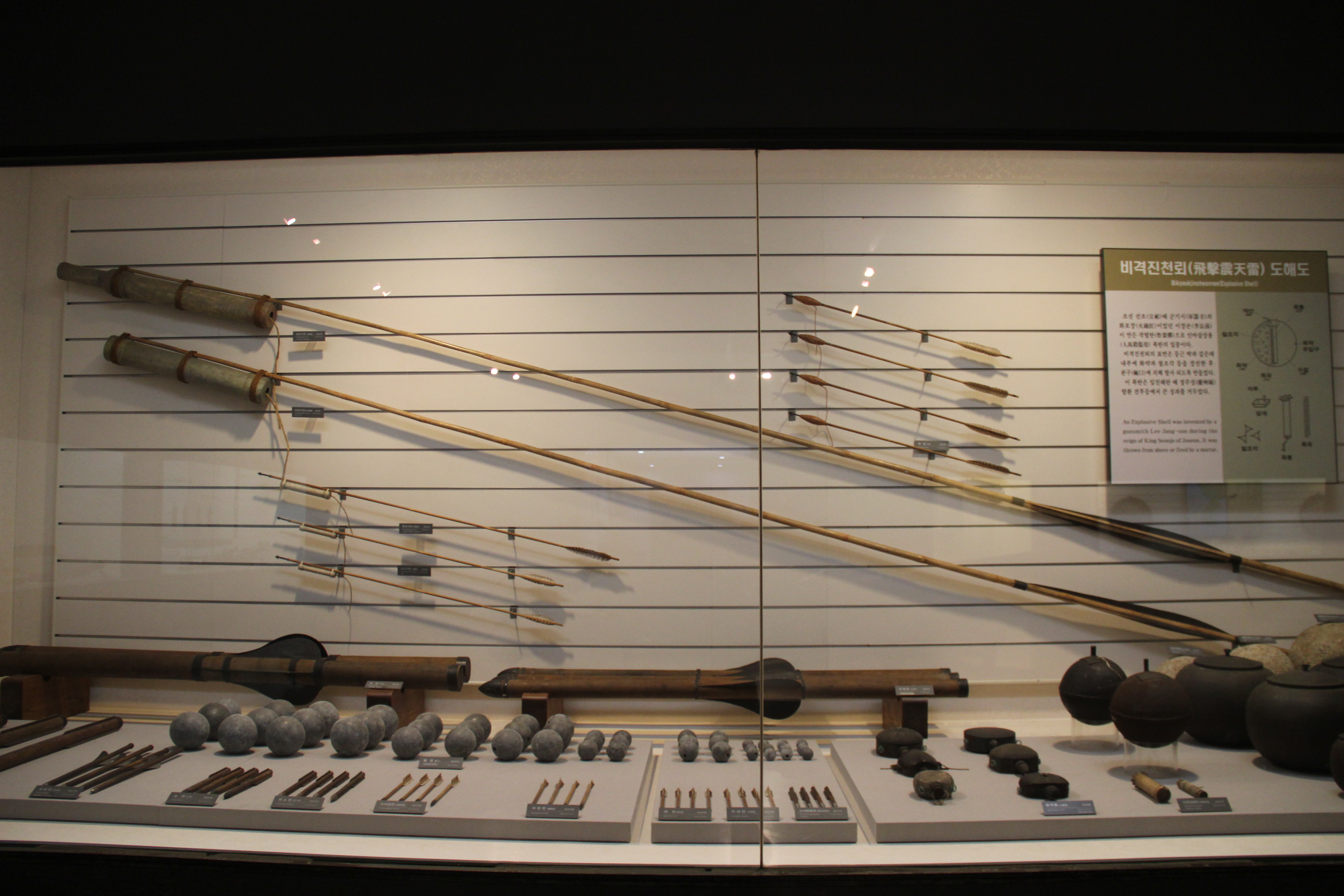
different types of shells (War Memorial of Korea)

A unique method of loading the Koreans (and the Chinese, to some extent) had was that they used a block of wood (gyeongmok) and some paper as a wad. This increased range, power, and possibly accuracy. Then, jolanhwan (조란환/iron shot) and sand were repeatedly placed on top of it, and finally a cannonball covered with lead was loaded.

Cannonballs of stone (danseok) or iron (cheoltanja), iron shot (sometimes in conjunction with arrows) were used, but a large wooden dart with iron fins (leather for the smaller types) and head was preferred. These were more accurate. Test firings in Seoul noted that the darts buried themselves into the ground up to their iron fletching. When the Korea Naval Academy tested one shot out of a cheonja-chongtong, it flew 400 m (1,300 ft) and penetrated 80 cm (31 in) into a granite wall.

The Mortars used for sieges fired bombs called stone balls or Bigyeokjincheolloe(비격진천뢰/飛擊震天雷). Like the Coehorn, this one was equipped with a primitive Time fuse, so the fuse would light when fired and explode after a certain period of time when it fell to the ground.

== See also ==
- List of firearms before the 20th century
- Artillery of Japan
- Hwacha
- Japanese invasions of Korea (1592–1598)
- Panokseon
