= Panokseon =

Type of large Korean warship (15th–19th century)

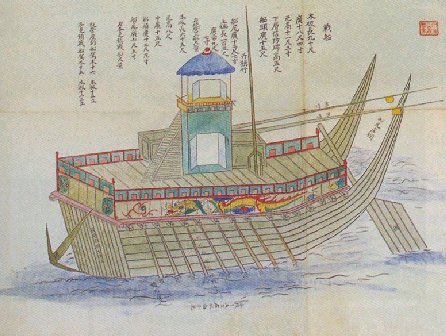
- An old painting of a panokseon.

Class overview
- Name: Board roofed or superstructure ship; (panokseon)
- Operators: Joseon
- Built: 1555
- In service: Circa 16th century
- Lost: Unknown number sank in Battle of Chilcheollyang
- Preserved: Replicas only in museums

History

Joseon
- Laid down: 1555
- Launched: 1555
- In service: 1555

General characteristics
- Length: Large: 100 to 120 feet (30.5 to 36.6 m); Medium: 70 feet (21 m)
- Beam: 30 to 40 feet (9.1 to 12.2 m)
- Propulsion: 50–60 oarsmen
- Complement: 125 marines
- Armament: 26 or more cannons; Hwacha; Repeating crossbows; Swivel-guns; Pavisade
- Notes: In full operational conditions cannons ranged between 200 yds to 600 yds

- Panokseon
- Hangul: 판옥선
- Hanja: 板屋船
- RR: panokseon
- MR: p'anoksŏn

Panokseon (Korean: 판옥선) was a class of Korean oar- and sail-propelled ship that was the main class of warship used by Joseon during the late 16th century. The first ship of this class was constructed in 1555. These ships were built from sturdy pine wood and, as the primary warship of the Korean Navy, they were instrumental in victories under the command of Admiral Yi Sun-shin against numerically larger Japanese fleets during the 1592-1598 Japanese invasions of Korea.

A key feature of a panokseon was its multiple decks. The first deck had non-combatant personnel, such as the rowers, who were positioned between the lower deck and the upper deck, away from enemy fire. The combatant personnel were stationed on the upper deck, which allowed them to attack the enemy from a higher vantage point. The panokseon also had a raised roofed observation platform where the commander stood.

The panokseon served as the base for the Korean warship type called the geobukseon, which was used to great effect during the 1592-1598 Japanese invasions of Korea.

== Characteristics ==
In line with the traditional structure of Korean ships, the panokseon had a U-shaped hull and a flat keel. This feature was due to the nature of the southern and western Korean coastal waters, which have a large tidal range and flat, expansive tidal plains. A flat keel enables a ship to sit comfortably on the tideland when the tide is out, after coming ashore or inside a wharf at high water. It also ensures greater mobility, a shallow draft, and in particular allows a ship to make sharp changes of direction at short notice. The panokseon's features were among the main reasons why Admiral Yi was able to employ the Crane Wing formation at the Battle of Hansan Island with great success.

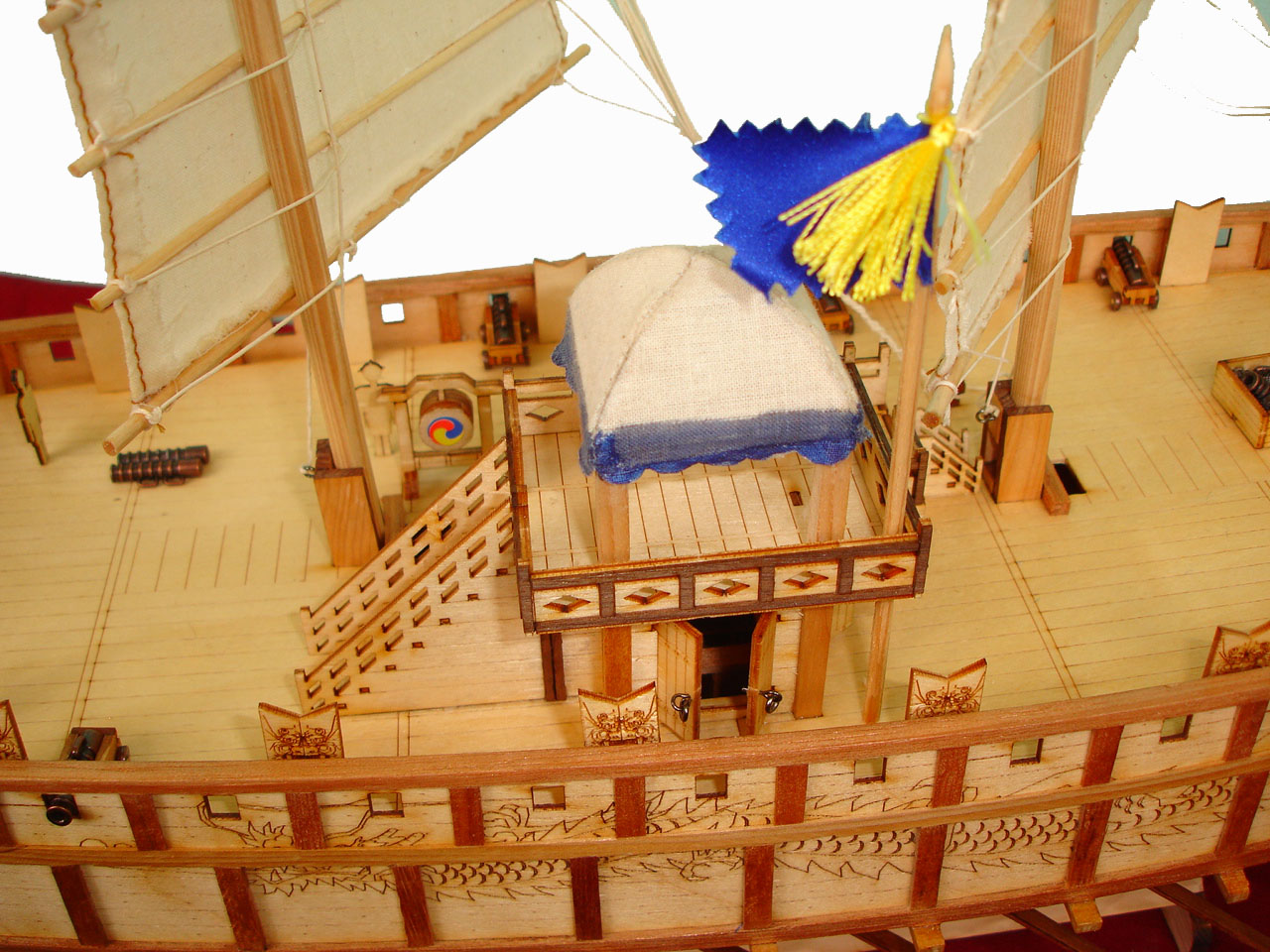
A model of panokseon centering on the commander's deck.

Panokseons were propelled by both sails and oars. Of the two basic types of sail - square and lateen - the square sail has strong performance downwind but struggles windward, whereas the fore-and-aft lateen sail excels against the wind, at the cost of an increased crew requirement for handling. In the civilizations of Europe and around the Mediterranean Sea, square sails were used in the galleys of Ancient Greece and the Viking longships, and the fore-and-aft variety as early as the Mediterranean dromons of the Middle Ages. When the Age of Discovery began in the fifteenth century, multiple-masted ships equipped with both types of sails eventually appeared. In Korea fore-and-aft sail-equipped (i.e. double-masted) ships had been in use since the eighth century. The panokseon therefore had two masts by default, and possessed sufficient crew such that their position and angle could easily be managed so that the sails could be used in all winds, whether adverse or favorable.

Panokseons had two to three levels stacked up on top of each other. By having multiple levels the rowers at the bottom were relatively safe, and marines at the top would have a height advantage over the enemy, firing down upon them and avoiding boarding of the ship. The upper deck had a tower in the middle of the ship that would be used for command and observation. The deck of the panokseon was broad and flat, making it ideal for the installation of cannons.

Panokseons came in different sizes; the largest vessels estimated to range between 70 feet (21 m) and 100 feet (30 m) in length. Other sources indicate that the variation in size was greater, from 50 feet (15 m) to 110 feet (34 m). The ship usually had 8 to 10 oars on each side, 50 to 60 oarsmen and sailors and another 125 marines (i.e. fighting men).

== Construction ==
Because of the rough waters around Korea's coast, as well as the sudden changes in tides and currents, Korean boats throughout history had to be strong. Korean ship building tradition created simple, but very structurally sound vessels. Throughout Korea's naval history, strength and power was emphasized rather than speed.

Two types of woods were used to construct panokseon: pine for the hull and oak for the pegs and masts. Oak is a strong but heavy wood, so its use on ships was limited to the frame. Pine was also strong, but much lighter. Pine was usually allowed to season incompletely so that it would bend flexibly and not become too stiff. Despite its advantages, pine had many knots and had to be cut thickly; thus the panokseon were built using thicker timbers. Instead of iron nails panokseons were held together by means of oak pegs, matching indentations, and interlocking teeth. This meant that as its boards absorbed water and expanded the fasteners did not rust, thus accounting for greater integrity of the hull.

== Weapons ==
Panokseons had on board several varieties of cannon, such as those named Heaven, Earth, Black and Yellow. Heaven was the largest cannon with the greatest range and the most common cannon on the ships. Earth was a smaller cannon and Black and Yellow were smaller still. The Heaven cannon fired daejŏn (a long, thick arrow in the shape of a rocket) with a range of 500 metres (1,600 ft), as well as jeolhwan (cannon shot) which could travel up to a distance of 1 kilometre (0.62 mi). Wangu, a kind of mortar, which fired stones or shells with a radius of 20 centimetres (7.9 in), was also used by the Korean navy. Hwachas were also used on panokseons.

Another noteworthy aspect of Korea’s heavy fire-arms is that they were not all invented to meet the sudden emergency of war. These weapons in fact made their appearance some 200 years prior to the 1592–1598 Japanese invasions of Korea. Thanks to the efforts of Ch'oe Mu-sŏn, a general and a chemist, Korea began manufacturing and developing gunpowder and powder-based weapons. Korean cannons first saw action in 1380 against a large fleet of Japanese pirate ships and were found to be a great success.

In the 15th century, under the lead of Sejong the Great, who was himself a pioneer of scientific research, the performance of these heavy artillery improved dramatically. Having built a cannon range next to the Royal Court, and after much experimentation and study, King Sejong finally increased the extent of the cannons’ firepower from 300 metres (980 ft) to 1,000 metres (3,300 ft). Naval cannons were also developed at this time and among them, Heaven, Earth, Black and Yellow cannon were later employed by Yi Sun-sin. The development of artillery steadily continued after King Sejong, and saw the invention of the bigyeokjincholloe, a timed grenade that flung out hundreds of metal shards upon explosion, and the dapoki, a machine capable of firing many arrows at once. One of the types of cannons were arrows with a pipe filled with gunpowder.

By the time of the Japanese invasions of Korea, the cannons used by the Korean naval forces were capable of firing a variety of projectiles, including fragmenting iron shot, stones, and buckshot, several hundred yards. Among the most feared projectiles fired by the Earth cannons was a ballista-like large iron arrow covered in incendiary material, which was used to great effect against Japanese ships.

== Comparison to Japanese warships ==
The differences between the Panokseon and Japanese ships were significant. The Japanese equivalents were the large Atakebune class and the medium sekibune-class ships, which superficially resembled panokseon. In contrast to the panokseon, the hulls of the Japanese vessels had sharp, V-shaped bows. A sharp underside was favorable for swift or long-distance travel in the open seas because of lower water resistance (thus these ships had faster cruising speeds). Since this variety of hull had a deep draft (penetrates deeper into the water), however, the turning radius of such ships was considerably large and changing direction was therefore a lengthy process. In addition, ships with larger drafts have a more difficult time of navigating narrow and shallower waters. Japanese ships were thus vastly less maneuverable than the panokseon in Korea's narrow channel waters.

The medium-sized sekibune ships, smaller craft, and most Japanese transport ships had a single mast and could only sail in favorable winds. The atakebune ship type was an exception in that it had two masts, but the main parts of its vessels were square-rigged and their sails were again limited to use in favorable winds.

It is worthwhile also to compare the hulls of the two nations’ respective warships, and their relative strength. The panokseon used thick, high density boards, giving an overall sturdiness to the ship’s structure. Japanese warships were structurally weaker, due to the thin, lower density timber used to build them, particularly cedar and fir. These were light weight woods and as they had fewer knots than pine, could be cut thinner. The sekibune in particular, being the standard warship of the Japanese fleet, was built primarily as a transport ship and to be as light as possible, increasing its speed at the expense of structural integrity. This is consistent with traditional Japanese naval tactics of the time, which emphasized boarding enemy ships and engaging their crews in hand-to-hand combat.

Another major difference was the use of iron nails versus the use of wood pegs to hold the ship together. Korean ships were held together by interlocking teeth in the wood and wood pegs. The Japanese warships, on the other hand, relied on iron nails which, as time passed and corrosion and rust set in, eventually weakened the hull.

This difference in structural integrity also determined the number of cannons that could be carried on board, as well as their ammunition caliber. Because the Japanese ships lacked the strength to withstand the recoil of cannon, even the largest ship class, atakebune, could carry only four at most (six if there were two smaller breech loading swivel guns). A sekibune could only carry two. A panokseon could carry at least 20 cannons, but usually carried more (in some cases up to 50). Since the hulls of Korean warships were strong enough, moreover, they were able to carry a large number of long-range cannons. These could be installed with ease on the large upper deck of panokseon ships, and their angle configured at will to increase the range. Since the Japanese warships only allowed for a very limited number of cannons, their sailors mainly used muskets, which had a range of 100–200 m (330–660 ft); as such Japanese naval commanders would attempt to use a volley of musket fire to clear enemy ships and employ the grapple and board method.

The traditional and main naval strategy employed by the Japanese was that of hand-to-hand boarding combat, whereby sailors would attempt to board an enemy ship and rely on melee weapon combat on the decks to achieve victory. This method was mainly used because Japanese soldiers excelled at melee combat and because their ships were very fast. The Japanese Navy's concept of sea battle was therefore one of a fight between crews rather than the vessels themselves. This was the most common naval strategy in the world during this time, and was also used by the Spanish and the home fleets of the Mediterranean and Indian Ocean of the day. The Korean Navy, however, utilizing superior warships and firepower, engaged in a more modern, distanced kind of naval warfare, and Korean panokseons of the time were built specifically to resist Japanese wako boarding actions. During Hideyoshi's invasions of Korea, a vast number of Japan's transports and warships were destroyed by Admiral Yi Sun-shin's leadership, initiative, superior firepower, tactics, and knowledge of strategy.

== See also ==
- Military history of Korea
- History of Korea
- Joseon Navy
