= War wagon (disambiguation) =

War wagon is an ancient Chinese, medieval Korean, or Czech siege weapon.

War wagon may also refer to:

- The War Wagon, a 1967 western film starring John Wayne and Kirk Douglas
- Hwacha, a Korean weapon which employs gunpowder and projectiles
- A carroccio or carro della guerra, a four-wheeled war altar used by the medieval republics of Italy
- War Wagon, in comics, a fictional weapon used unsuccessfully against the Hulk; see Betty Ross
- War Wagon, nickname for rotary snowplow by staff of the Southern Pacific Railway
