= Sin'gijŏn =

Korean fire arrow rocket

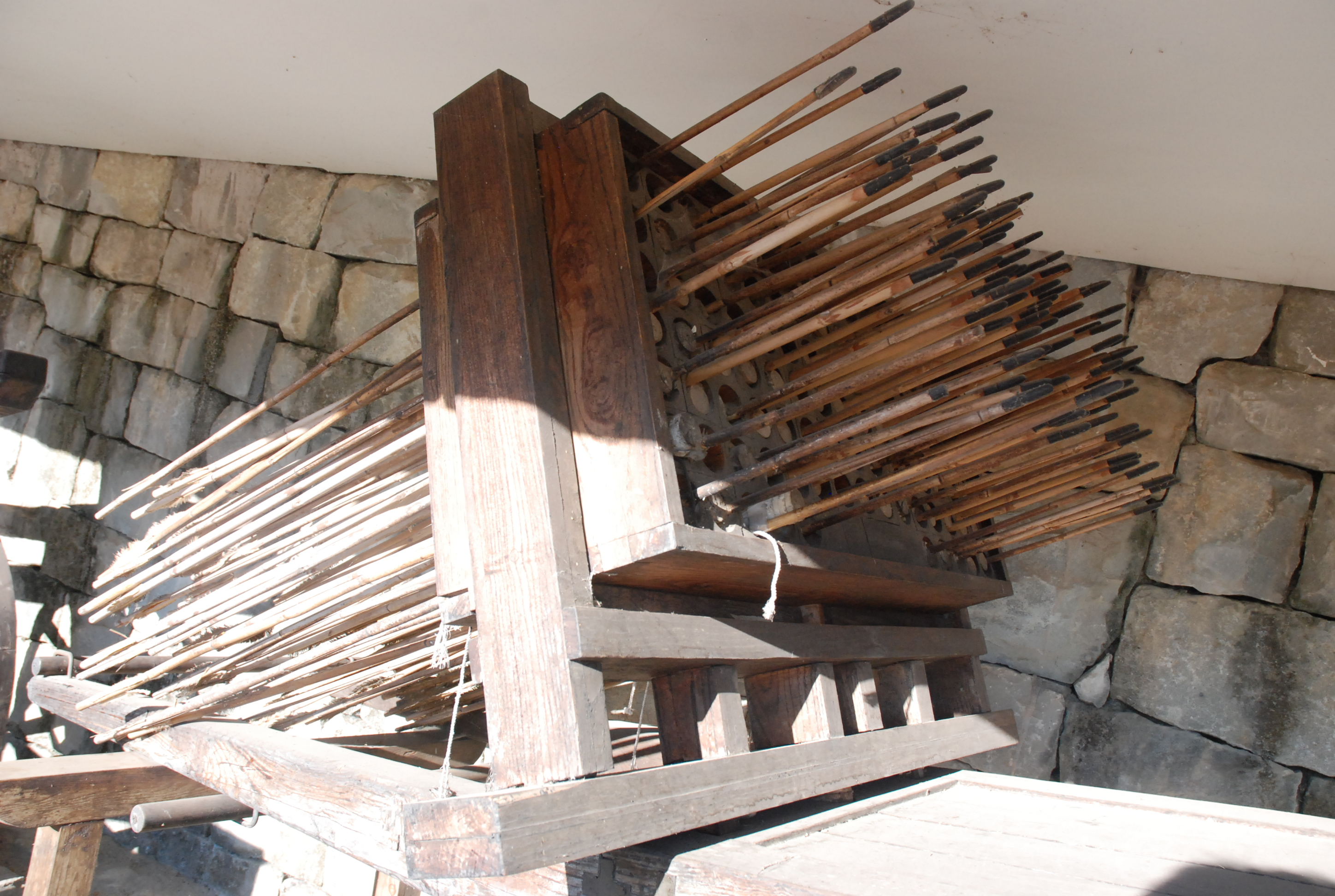

Korean name
- Hangul: 신기전
- Hanja: 神機箭
- RR: singijeon
- MR: sin'gijŏn

Sin'gijŏn (Korean: 신기전; Hanja: 神機箭; lit. 'Divine machine arrows') was a type of Korean fire arrow rocket, used during the era of the Joseon Dynasty (1392–1897). Multiple sin'gijŏn could be launched by hwacha (multiple rocket launcher).

== History ==
During the late 14th century, in order to gain ascendancy at sea against Japanese pirates (wokou or waegu), fire arrows called hwajŏn (화전) were used, which would become the predecessor of the sin'gijŏn. The Koreans had tried to acquire rockets and gunpowder and their production methods from China. The Chinese, however, regarded the technology of gunpowder as a state secret and restricted access to it and trade in its nitrous raw materials (which could only be found in China). The Koreans therefore sought to acquire the manufacturing secrets of gunpowder for themselves and, in 1374 (–1376), Ch'oe Musŏn was able to bribe a Chinese merchant to obtain the secret formula for manufacturing gunpowder, as well as limited technical knowledge about Chinese firearm and cannon technology. He also successfully extracted potassium nitrate from the soil and rocks from Japanese trade routes, and developed Korea's first gunpowder.

Details of the sin'gijŏn were not known until very recently. Korean historians had found the schematics added as an appendix in the book Gukjo Orye Seorye (국조오례서례; 國朝五禮序例) but did not realize what they were until the academic Chae Yeon-suk identified them as the lost schematics of the sin'gijŏn. The schematics detail the lengths of wooden materials, using units down to 0.3 mm (0.012 in). The schematics are one of the best representations of the acute scientific understanding of the Joseon Dynasty.

The sin'gijŏn saw most of its early use in the northern borders of Joseon, in the campaign to expand its northern borders by driving out the "Orangkae" ("Barbarians", especially referring the Jurchen people). Later, its uses expanded to coastal defence against Japanese pirates and was much used throughout the conflicts during the Joseon Dynasty. During the Imjin War, General Kwŏn Yul attributed his successful defense of the fortress Haengjusanseong against numerically superior Japanese forces to the singijeon.

== Overview ==
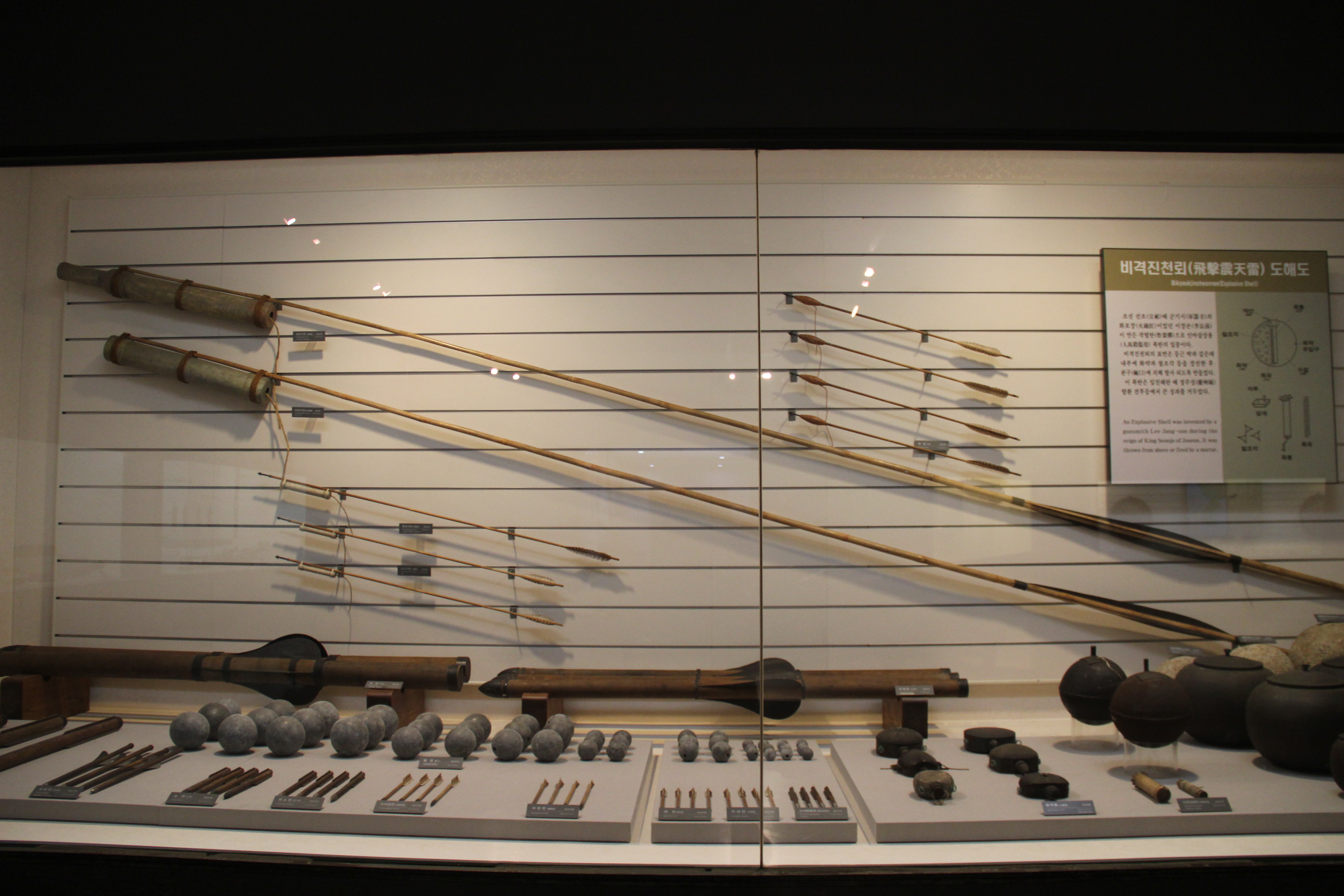
Sin'gijŏn of various sizes

Sin'gijŏn were divided among three major types: large, medium, and small. The 52 cm (20 in) long rocket was launched individually on a handheld gun, and the launch was initiated by a fuse in the tube. Even after launch, the fuse would remain in the tube, consuming the black powder until it hit the "warhead" and caused detonation. The fuse length was determined by the amount of gunpowder in the paper tube, and was adjusted depending on the distance that the missile had to cover so that it would explode on the target. Its range was around 1–2 km (0.62–1.24 mi). The medium sin'gijŏn was of the same construction and function as the large sin'gijŏn, but, due to its smaller size of 13 cm (5.1 in), its range was limited to 150 m (490 ft). However, its explosive warhead was still powerful enough to make a 30 cm (12 in) deep crater in a patch of sand. The small sin'gijŏn was simply an arrow with a gunpowder pouch attached to it, and had no explosive capabilities. It was launched in multiples of 100 by a hwacha, and had a range of 100 m (330 ft). All gunpowder weapons including the sin'gijŏn used black powder.

== See also ==
- The Divine Weapon
- Korean bow
- Firework
- Huolongjing
- Korean cannon
- Chongtong
- Hwacha
