= Hwacha =

Medieval Korean multiple rocket launcher

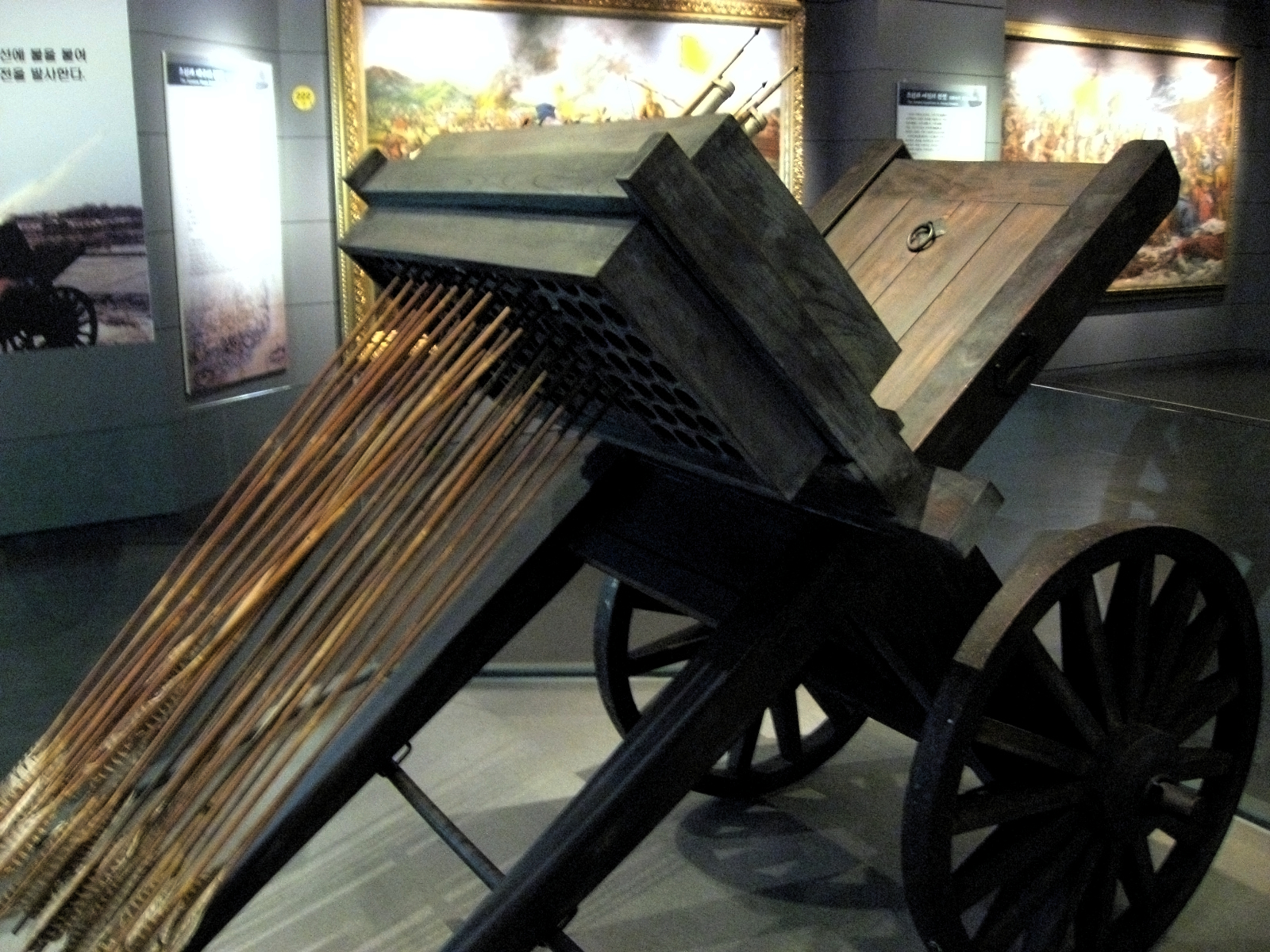
- A hwacha model at the Seoul War Memorial.

Korean name
- Hangul: 화차
- Hanja: 火車
- RR: hwacha
- MR: hwach'a

The hwacha or hwach'a (Korean: 화차; Hanja: 火車; lit. 'fire cart') was a fifteenth-century Korean weapons platform capable of performing both the multiple rocket launcher and volley gun roles. The overall design resembled a wooden cart with a launch pad attached; depending on the specific version and type, it could fire up to 200 singijeon (rocket-powered) arrows, or several dozen iron-headed arrows or bolts out of gun barrels. The term was also used to refer to other war wagon- or cart-based artillery in later periods, such as that developed by Byeon Yijung in the 1590s.

These weapons were most notably deployed in the defense against the two Japanese invasions of the Korean Peninsula in 1592–98. Some East Asian historians believe the hwacha and the turtle ship had a decisive effect during the war.

Hwachas appear in Korean museums, national parks, and popular culture today.

== History ==
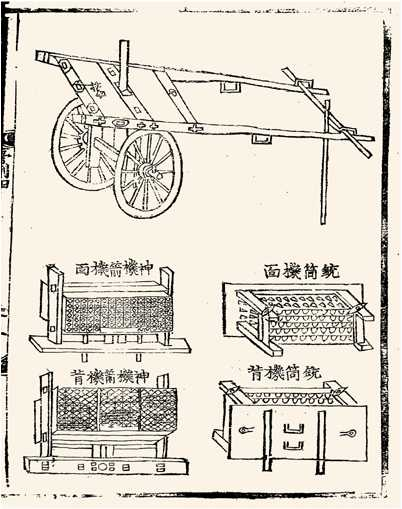
Contemporary plans for hwacha assembly and disassembly. Left mid and below are the front and rear of Singijeon rocket launcher modules; at the right are the front and rear of the munjong organ gun modules (Gukjo-orye-seorye, 1474)

=== Early firearms ===
Firearms were recognized by Goryeo military leaders as necessary for national defense, especially against the Japanese raiders frequently plundering coastal towns in increasing numbers from 1350 onwards. Gunpowder and firearms explicitly designed for combating them were imported from China in 1374, but the necessary knowledge and expertise for production of both was held under strict embargo by the Chinese. Thus, local Korean production did not begin until Ch'oe Musŏn acquired the methods for purifying potassium nitrate from visiting Chinese merchants and subsequently accomplished it between 1374 and 1376. A government office for further development of gunpowder and firearms was established in 1377, with Ch'oe appointed as its head. Several weapons were developed here, including hand cannons and a series of rockets, in particular the juhwa.

=== Hwacha ===
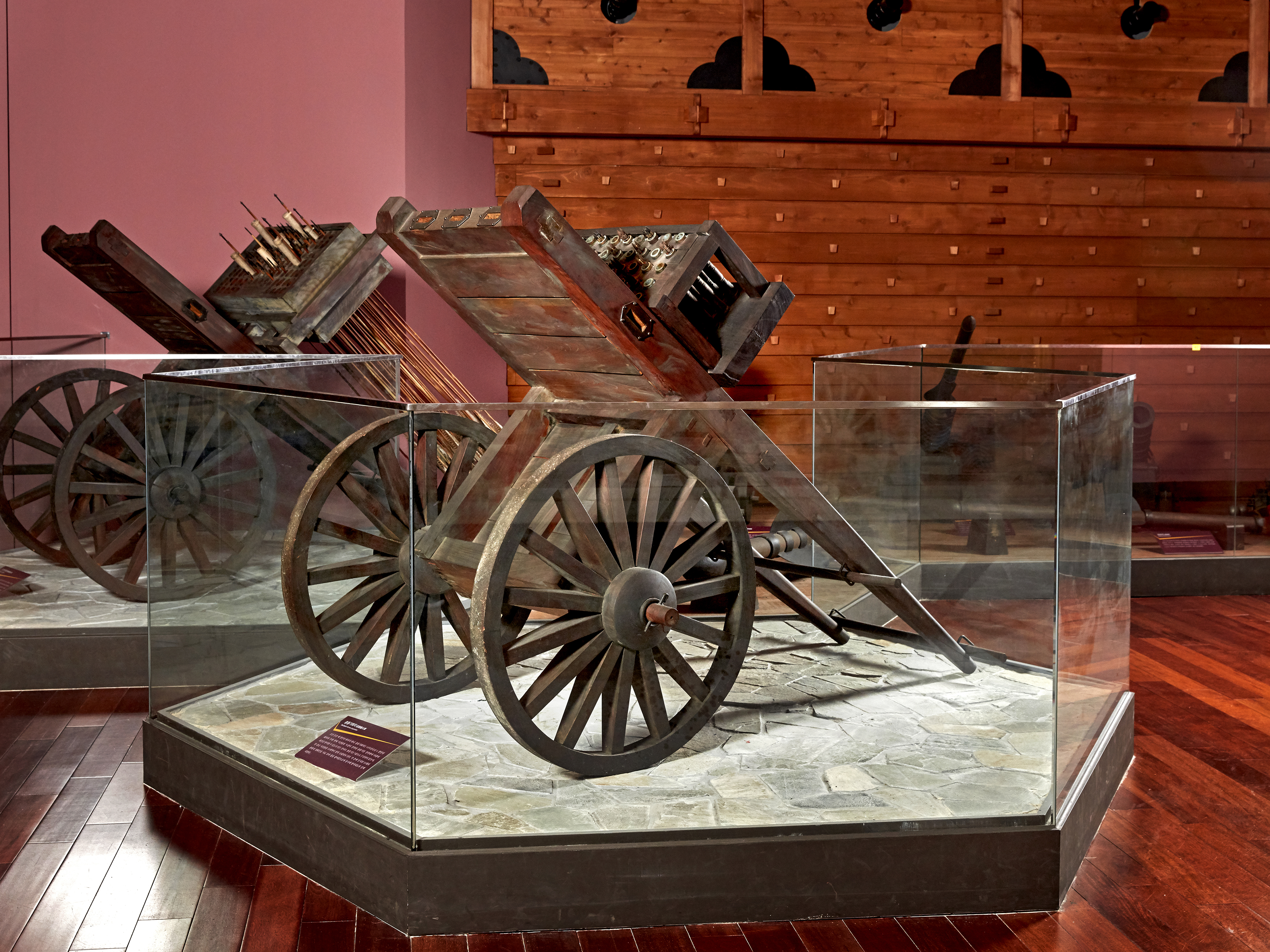
Chongtong-gi(총통기/銃筒機) Hwacha. Each of the 50 gun barrels was loaded with four bullets, firing a total of 200 bullets. (Seoul War Memorial)

The hwacha was developed from the juhwa and the singijeon. The first hwacha was created in 1409 during the Joseon Dynasty by several Korean scientists, including Yi To (이도; not to be mistaken for Sejong the Great, due to the similarity in their names) and Ch'oe Haesan). In 1451, King Munjong issued a decree calling for more powerful and more effective hwacha types to be developed. By the end of 1451, hundreds of hwachas were deployed throughout the Korean peninsula, with fifty units being deployed in Hanseong (present-day Seoul) and another 80 on the northern border.

One of the new hwacha types—purportedly developed by King Munjong and his younger brother Pe themselves—was the Munjong hwacha, and had interchangeable modules for a multiple rocket launcher-type weapon capable of firing 100 rocket-powered arrows or a volley gun-type weapon capable of firing 200 darts from its 50 Chongtong gun barrels.

Another variant was the Mangam hwacha, a box-cart-type hwacha with forty seungja-chongtong gun barrels (fourteen in the mid-front module; thirteen in both the left and right module). Each barrel held a maximum of 15 projectiles, and thus the Mangam hwacha was capable of firing up to 600 bullets per salvo. It required two soldiers to operate, one for aiming and firing the weapon and one for reloading. This type was often decorated with large dokkaebi faces painted on their three sides.

=== Imjin wars (1592–1598) ===
Hwachas saw action most extensively against the Japanese during their invasions of Korea in the 1590s. They were primarily placed in fortresses or citadels, and used defensively. They proved decisive in many battles and were most prominent in the Battle of Haengju, in which 3,400 Koreans repelled 30,000 Japanese with the help of 40 hwachas. The Japanese samurai infantry typically advanced in dense formations, presenting ideal targets for the hwacha.

== Components ==
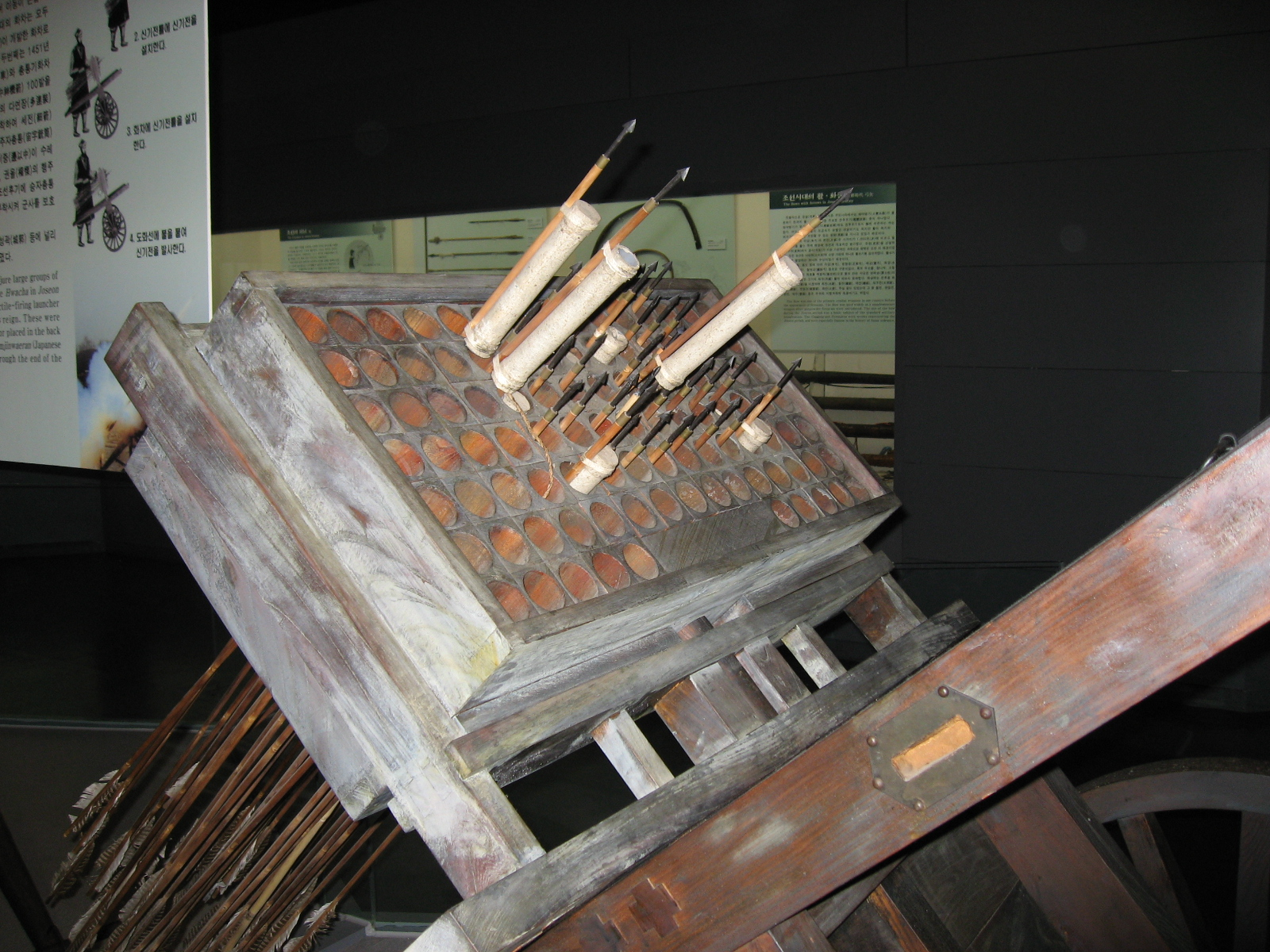
Hwacha launch pad. Igniters are placed in the narrow section of each arrow to be fired.

The hwacha's structure resembled a handcart's. Its top contained a mobile wooden launchpad containing 100 to 200 cylindrical holes, into which igniters similar or identical to those used with Korean cannon (chongtong) were placed.

The ammunition, similar to fire arrows used by the ancient Chinese, consisted of a 1.1 m (3 ft 7 in) long arrow with the addition of a gunpowder-filled paper tube attached to the shaft just below the head. Approximately 100 projectiles were loaded and launched in one volley, and had a range of up to 2,000 m (6,600 ft). One variant had five rows of ten gun barrels in the launchpad, each of which could fire a bundle of four arrow-like projectiles for a total of up to 200 arrows per salvo.

The back side of the hwacha featured two parallel arms that allowed the operator to push and pull the machine and a vertical strip designed for in-line attacks or ground-sentry positions. Wood pivots and iron axles usually fastened the wagon-like wheels. To reduce friction between the wheels and the axles, tar oil was used. The Korean army included siege engineers and blacksmiths to repair the hwacha in case of damage due to poor road conditions, bad weather, or battle.

== Projectiles ==
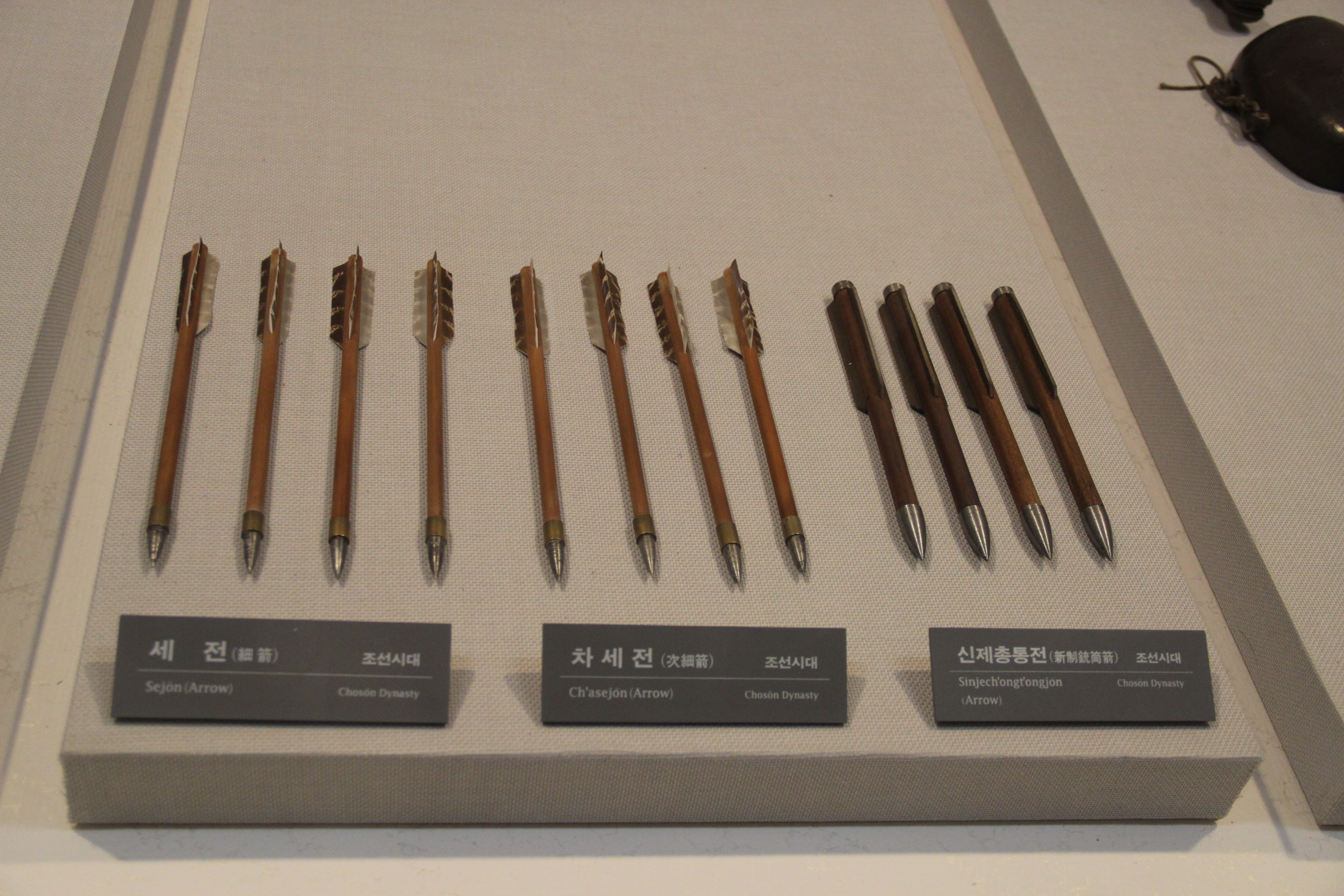
The Chongtonggi hwacha was loaded with small arrows with metal tips. This is called Sejeon(세전/細箭)

The two main ammunition types hwachas were designed to use were arrows (either full-wood or steel-tipped versions) and ball ammunition. Mostly, specific designs required specific ammunition types, but some hwacha types carried modules that could be swapped, enabling a single hwacha to fire several different ammunition types.

The cannons or mortars used in Western warfare during Middle Ages and the 16th century shot heavy iron ball ammunition, which needed larger propellant charges and thicker barrels to withstand the resulting stresses, making them heavy and cumbersome weapons. Because hwachas fired lighter projectiles (arrows or small-caliber iron ball ammunition) their construction was much lighter, making them much more nimble and easy-to-maneuver weapons.

The holes in the hwacha launch array ranged in diameter from 2.5–4 cm (0.98–1.57 in), which allowed thin Gungdo bow-style arrows to be fired and also admitted sajeonchongtong-type igniters placed in the back side of the shooting board.

Singijeon-class projectiles were small arrows designed by Korean siege engineers specifically for hwacha use. Called so (소), or "small", they possessed a pouch of black powder attached at the end of the arrow, near to the fletching section. Besides the singijeon-class projectiles, hwachas could fire 100 steel-tipped rockets.

== Usage ==
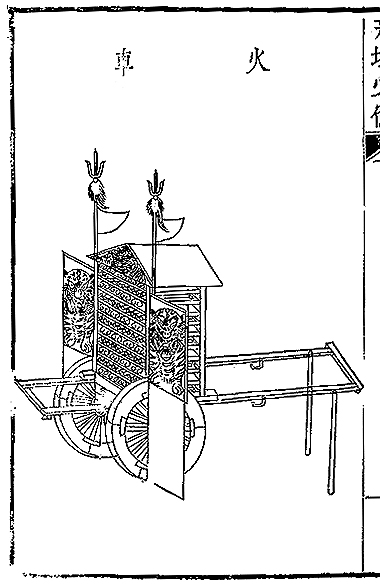
A hwacha from the Yungwon pilbi, 1813

Once a hwacha was set up for combat, the operators would use the gunpowder stored in a boot-like bag tied on each igniter to be used for each hole on the machine. After priming, the operators could load the hwacha with the desired ammunition and be ready to shoot. To do so, they stepped back, covered their ears, and pulled the rope for each igniter.

At sea, maneuvers were slightly different and more complex because the operator would need to find a proper and stable firing position. Some hwacha operators preferred to be on the rowers' deck, where they could shoot from the windows, while others preferred to be on the main deck to shoot at the enemy ships' sails. These kind of maneuvers were particularly seen on Korean Panokseon warships.

== See also ==
- Battle of Haengju
- Fire arrow
- Huo Che
- Huolongjing
- Hwacha on MythBusters
- Japanese invasions of Korea (1592–1598)
- Katyusha, a multi-barrel Soviet rocket launcher used in World War 2.
- Korean cannon
- Ribauldequin
- Singijeon
- Type 63 multiple rocket launcher and RPU-14 - modern versions of light MRL
