= Ch'oe Haesan =

Korean military officer (1380–1443)

- Hangul: 최해산
- Hanja: 崔海山
- RR: Choe Haesan
- MR: Ch'oe Haesan

Ch'oe Haesan (Korean: 최해산; Hanja: 崔海山, 1380–1443) was a Korean military officer during the Joseon dynasty. He was the son of Ch'oe Musŏn and part of the Yeongcheon Ch'oe clan. He inherited his father's weaponmaking secrets and served as a military commander.
