= Ch'oe Musŏn =

Korean general (1330–1395)

- Hangul: 최무선
- Hanja: 崔茂宣
- RR: Choe Museon
- MR: Ch'oe Musŏn

Ch'oe Musŏn (Korean: 최무선; Hanja: 崔茂宣; 1330–1395) was a medieval Korean chemist, inventor, and military general during the late Goryeo Dynasty and early Joseon Dynasty. He is best known for enabling Korea to domestically produce gunpowder by obtaining a recipe for the Chinese commodity from a Chinese merchant, as well as inventing various gunpowder-based weapons in an attempt to repel the wokou pirates that plundered coastal regions of the Korean Peninsula.

== Life ==
Ch'oe was born into a wealthy family in Yeongcheon, Gyeongsang Province; his father was an official in the administration. He qualified to be a military officer through civil service examination. The government's control of Goryeo was crumbling, and at the same time the pirates crossing the Korean Strait plundered much of the coastal regions. In the southern part of the nation, pirates even marched deep inland, causing havoc. The Goryeo government was not able to ensure security, despite the efforts of generals Yi Sŏnggye and Ch'oe Yŏng.

In his childhood, while he was at the royal palace with his father, who was working for the king, Ch'oe saw fireworks made by Mongols and Chinese, who at the time had indirect control of Goryeo (their influence was repealed by King Gongmin). Later in life, Ch'oe embarked on a quest to bring the recipe of gunpowder to Korea. He visited China, which was then ruled by the Mongol Yuan Dynasty. In general, technology of that region, such as cotton growing and gunpowder manufacture, was kept secret. Ch'oe sought to smuggle some examples of secret items, and eventually was able to obtain knowledge of the three key ingredients of gunpowder: sulfur, slack or fine coal, and potassium nitrate. However, the process to obtain niter, the mineral form of potassium nitrate, was difficult, and he did not know how to prepare gunpowder from the raw materials.

After a chain of experimental failures, Ch'oe considered abandoning the project, but heard about a wealthy Chinese merchant named Li Yuan who had great knowledge of gunpowder. Ch'oe visited Li while he was staying in Goryeo on business, and bribed Li for the gunpowder recipe, in violation of Mongol and Chinese law. Korea began its first domestic production of gunpowder between the years of 1374 and 1376.

Ch'oe demonstrated the power of the new weapon in front of King U and many other court advisers; and almost every one of them were impressed by its devastating power compared to other arms which were already in existence in Korea. The government gave him great support, establishing the official laboratory and factory for gunpowder in 1377; here Ch'oe invented various kinds of cannons, Hand cannons, and other firearms. Among his inventions were the singijeon and the hwacha, a launching device somewhat resembling the first modern multiple rocket launcher. Then he put his inventions into real battle against the Japanese at the Battle of Jinpo, in which he participated as one of the Korean commanders; the battle was easily won by Korean forces, thanks to the gunpowder. He also began to build warships to chase off the pirates.

Since his inventions greatly contributed to his country, he was able to be promoted and participate in politics. However he was already old when he obtained the gunpowder recipe from the merchant, and his later days saw the change of dynasty from Goryeo to Joseon. Soon after the foundation of the new Joseon Dynasty, Ch'oe retired from both military and political affairs, and died in 1395. After his death, King Taejo gave him the honorary title of vice-premier. He is still remembered in Korea as the perfect role model for many scientists and as a patriot.

His son was the Korean military officer Ch'oe Haesan.

== Work book ==
- Hwayaksuryeonbeop (화약수련법 火藥修鍊法)
- Hwapobeop (화포법 火砲法)

== See also ==
- Fire Arrow
- Hwacha
- Chang Yŏngsil
- Korean cannon
- Military of the Goryeo Dynasty
- Singijeon
