= Joseon Army =

14th–19th century Korean army

- Royal emblem of Joseon
- Active: 14th century to 1897
- Disbanded: 13 October 1897
- Country: Korea
- Allegiance: King of Joseon
- Branch: Central Army; Provincial armies and Militias; Royal Guards
- Type: Army
- Role: Coastal defence and fortification Domestic security Force protection Land warfare
- Size: 84,500 (1592); 87,600 (1640s)

Insignia
- Ensign

The Joseon Army (Korean: 조선군대; Hanja: 朝鮮軍隊) was the army of the Korean dynasty of Joseon (1392–1897). The army defended the northern borders but seldom defended the southern regions. The army was best known for fending off the Jurchen raids and conquering the Korean Peninsula. However, Joseon's neo-Confucianism disavowed military development, causing them to be vulnerable to Japanese and Manchu invasions. Despite this, Joseon kept strengthening the army until the 19th century, when western powers and the Japanese forced them to open doors and modernize the army.

== History ==
=== Early period ===
The armed forces of the former Goryeo kingdom were Joseon's armed forces during the reign of King Taejo. However, the officials of the Joseon court commanded private armies from the previous kingdom. Yi Bang-won and his officers staged a coup against Taejo and his brother Jeongjong of Joseon, inciting the first and second strife of the princes. He advised Jeongjong to ban the ownership of private armies and become king in favor of having a central army. When Sejong ascended the throne, he created various military regulations to strengthen the safety of his kingdom, supported the advancement of Korean military technology, including the development of the cannon, mortars, fire arrows and the use of gunpowder.

==== Joseon–Jurchen border conflicts ====
Like Goryeo, Joseon made the Jurchens in the area around Hamhung on the northeastern Korean peninsula submit as vassals. The Joseon Koreans tried to deal with the military threat posed by the Jurchens by using both forceful means and incentives and by launching military attacks. At the same time, they tried to appease them with titles and degrees, traded with them and sought to acculturate them by having Korean women marry Jurchens and integrating them into Korean culture. Despite these measures, fighting continued between the Jurchen and the Koreans. The Ming Yongle Emperor was determined to wrest the Jurchens out of Korean influence and have China dominate them instead. Korea tried to persuade Jurchen leader Mentemu (Möngke Temür) to reject the Ming overtures, but were unsuccessful since Möngke Temür folded and submitted to the Ming. In 1433, Sejong sent Kim Chongsŏ, a prominent general, north to destroy the Jurchens. Kim's military campaign engaged the Jurchen clans such as the Odoli, Maolian and Udige capturing several castles, taking control of Hamgyong and continued pushing north expanding Korean territory to the Songhua River. He then established 4 counties, 6 garrisons, and several border forts in the region to safeguard the people from the Jurchens shaping the modern borders of Korea around 1450.

==== Oei Invasion ====
In 1419, King Sejong sent Yi Chongmu to raid the Japanese on Tsushima Island in the Oei Invasion as a response to Japanese Wokou raids on Korean coastal cities. Yi took 227 Korean ships and approximately 17,000 soldiers, landed, attacked, and plundered Japanese pirate settlements on Tsushima Island. The So clan, the ruling family of Tsushima, requested negotiations. In the diplomatic exchanges that followed, Korea permitted the So clan to continue trade with Korean coastal harbors under the condition that the clan suppresses the activities of Japanese pirates.

==== Yi Si-ae's Rebellion ====
When King Sejo came to power he strengthened the monarchy established by King Taejong by weakening the power of the State Council and bringing staff directly under the king's control. He also strengthened the administrative system to enable the government to determine exact population numbers and to mobilize troops effectively but caused Yi Si-ae's Rebellion. Yi Si-ae led the Iksok Force and the rebel army killing officials from the central government for not appointing northern officials to govern the northern provinces until they were defeated soon after the Battle of Manryeong.

=== Japanese Invasions of Korea ===
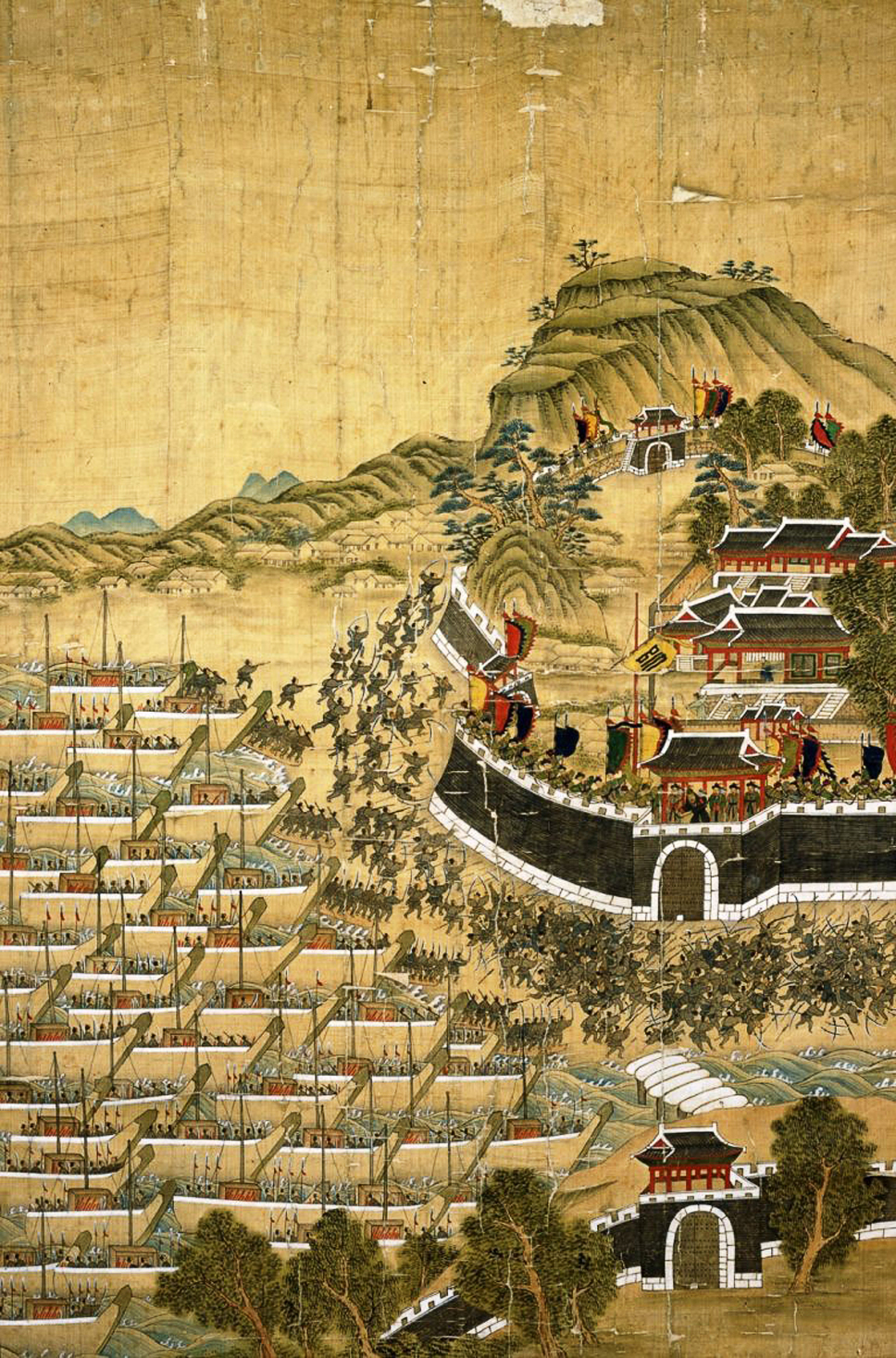
Siege of Busan.

By the 16th century, the military became weak by the disavowment from Confucian scholars. During the Imjin War, Joseon mobilized few military units within a standing army. Its defense depended heavily on the mobilization of the citizen soldiers in case of emergency. When Japan invaded Korea, Joseon deployed a total of 84,500 regular troops. During the first invasion, the Joseon army was no match for their sheer numbers armed with arquebuses and a combination of arms, and the Japanese pushed them north to Pyongyang. When the navy, and the Righteous Army cut off supply lines, this gave the regular army a chance to force the Japanese back to Pusan through many strategic battles. During the 1595–1596 Truce, Seonjo realized how important it was and tried to reform it with the help of Ming generals and established army training centers. Yu Sŏngnyong, the Chief State Councillor, spoke out about the Korean disadvantages. He examined why the Japanese had quickly overrun them and pointed out the flaws of their defense systems. Yu also pointed out how efficient the Japanese army was since it took them only one month to get Hanseong and how well organized they were. He noted how the Japanese moved their units in complex maneuvers, often weakening their enemy with arquebuses, then attacking with melee weapons. These reforms helped Joseon Army repel the second invasion of the Japanese army and win the war.

=== Yi Gwal's Rebellion ===
After the Injo Coup, the dissatisfied Yi Kwal who helped Injo ascend to the throne incited a rebellion against him for trying to arrest his son, Yi Chŏn. He led 10,000 of his soldiers to occupy Hanseong and replace him with Heungangun, his royal relative as king. But the Joseon army led by General Chang Man retook the capital and crushed the rebellion. Yi Kwal's Rebellion weakened the military, making them vulnerable to Later Jin's attack.

=== Manchu-Joseon conflicts ===
Conservative Westerners took hard-line policy toward the Jurchen-led Later Jin dynasty, keeping their alliance with the Ming dynasty. The Later Jin, who had remained primarily friendly to Joseon, began to regard Joseon as an enemy. Han Yun, who participated in the rebellion of Yi Kwal, fled to Manchuria and urged the Later Jin ruler Nurhaci to attack Joseon; thus, the friendly relationship between the Later Jin and Joseon ended.

==== Battle of Sarhū ====
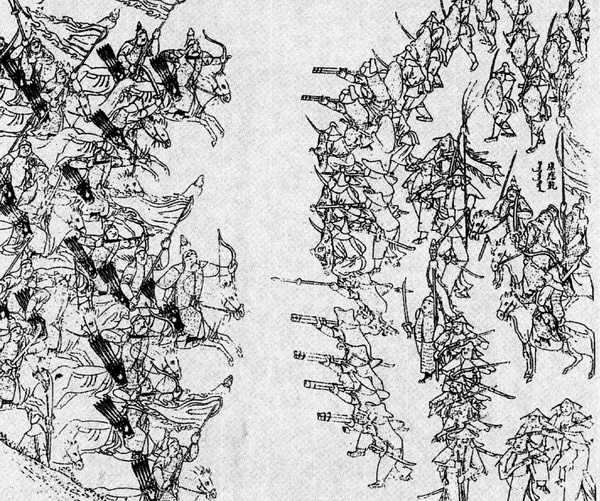
An illustration of Nurhaci's biography depicting the battle of Sarhu (1619)

In 1619, the Joseon Expeditionary Force led Commander Gang Hong-rip to engage Later Jin with the Ming Army at the Battle of Sarhū. But the allied forces lost two-thirds of the Joseon Expeditionary Force. The Jurchen released the captives and allowed them to return to their homeland. Gang Hong-rip, however, was kept for his proficiency in the Jurchen language. Later on, General Gang would be led to believe that his family had died in the political turmoil during a coup in his native kingdom of Joseon. To exact his revenge on the Joseon court, he urged Jin to invade Joseon, which led to the First Manchu invasion of Korea in 1627. Only during the peace negotiations did he find out that he had been misled.

The Joseon musketeers being overwhelmed by the Manchu cavalry prompted a revision of military tactics in Korea. In previous decades, the Imjin War was seen as a demonstration of the dominance of the firearm, and Joseon adjusted military forces accordingly. Both sides of the war lacked effective shock cavalry to take advantage of the vulnerabilities of unsupported musketeers. After the defeat at Sarhū, the Joseon forces revised their doctrine to have spearmen supporting the musketeers.

==== Later Jin invasion of Joseon ====
In 1627, 30,000 Manchu cavalries under General Amin and former Korean General Gang Hong-rip invaded Joseon, calling for the restoration of Gwanghaegun and execution of Westerners leaders, including Kim Chajŏm. General Chang Man again fought against Later Jin but could not repel the invasion. Once again, Injo fled to Ganghwa Island. Meanwhile, Jin had no reason to attack Joseon and decided to go back to prepare for war against the Ming, and peace soon settled. The Later Jin and Joseon dynasties were declared brother nations, and Later Jin withdrew from the Korean peninsula. However, most Westerners kept their hard-line policy despite the war. Nurhaci, who had generally good opinions toward Korea, did not invade Korea again; however, when Nurhaci died and Hong Taiji succeeded him as ruler, Jin again began to seek a chance for another war. King Injo provided refuge to Ming general Mao Wenlong and with his unit after they fled from Later Jin and came to Korea; this action caused Later Jin to invade Korea again.

==== Qing invasion of Joseon ====
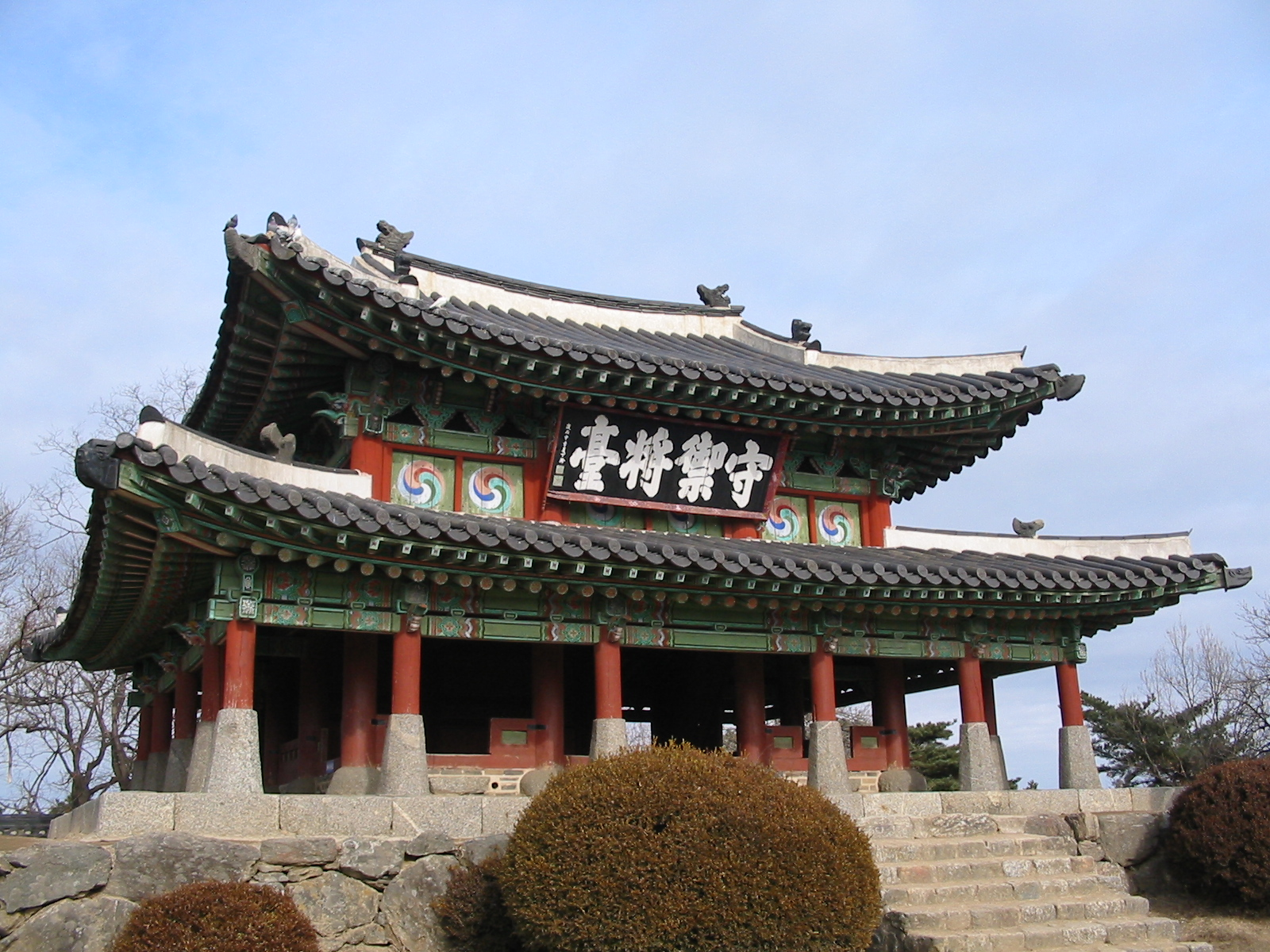
Sueojangdae, the command post of Namhansanseong, the last siege battle of the Qing invasion

In 1636, Hong Taiji officially renamed his dynasty the Qing dynasty and invaded Joseon personally. The Qing forces purposely avoided battle with General Im Gyeong Eop, a prominent Joseon army commander who was guarding the Uiju Fortress at the time. A Qing army of 128,000 men marched directly into Hanseong before Injo could escape to Ganghwa Island, driving Injo to Namhan Mountain Fortress instead. They ran out of food and supplies after the Manchu cut all supply lines during the siege. Injo finally surrendered to the Qing dynasty ceremoniously, bowing to the Hong Taiji nine times as Hong Taiji's servant and agreeing to the Treaty of Samjeondo, which required Injo to send his first son and second son to China as captives. Joseon then became a tributary state to the Qing dynasty, and the Qing went on to conquer the Central Plain in 1644. Though they lost the wars, their performance left a strong impression on the Manchus. The first emperor of the newly declared Qing dynasty later wrote: "The Koreans are incapable on horseback but do not transgress the principles of the military arts. They excel at infantry fighting."

=== Military expansion ===
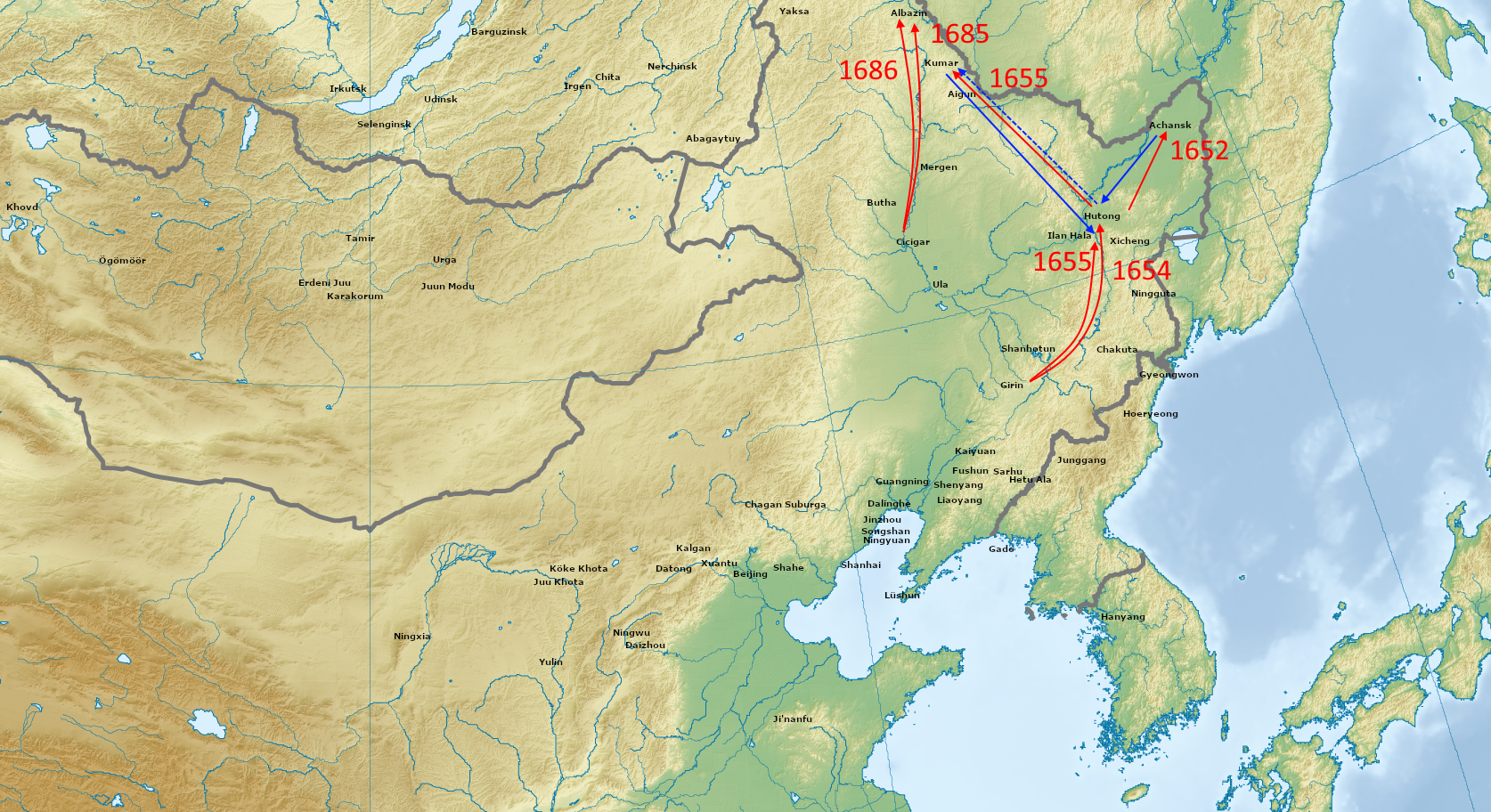
Russo-Qing border battles. The Joseon Army and Navy aided the Qing at Hutong two times.

Hyojong rose the throne after Injo and Sohyeon's death, he began to reform and expand the military of Korea. First, he removed Kim Chajŏm, who had corrupted politics and had greater power than the king himself. Then, he called Song Si-yeol and Kim Sang-heon to his court, who supported the war against the Qing Dynasty. His military expansion was massive, and he also built several border fortresses along Yalu River where Joseon and Qing shared a border. When a band of Dutch sailors, including Hendrick Hamel, drifted on Jeju Island, Hyojong ordered them to build muskets for the army, making it the first time to use firearms since the Imjin War. Hyojong could not implement his plan when his son Hyeonjong stopped him since Joseon had become a tributary state of the Qing Dynasty. The Qing dynasty continued to thrive, expanding quickly into the west after successfully conquering the Ming in 1644. Since the Manchus assimilated the massive Chinese army into their own, they became too mighty to resist. Although reformed and expanded, the Joseon military was no match against the combined Manchu and Chinese forces. Also, the Qing dynasty began to treat Joseon as its friend and closest ally. After Hyojong died, Hyeonjong rose to the throne and continued his father's military expansion and reconstruction of the nation, devastated by the Seven-Year War and two Manchu invasions.

=== Northern campaigns ===
The Naseon Jeongbeol, or "Suppression of the Russians" or the Northern campaign began when the expanded Joseon military was first put into action in 1654 when the Qing Dynasty called for help to fight against invading Russians. 150 Joseon musketeers, along with 3,000 Manchus, met the Russian army at the Battle of Hutong (호통; 好通), present-day Yilan, which the Qing–Joseon allied forces won. In 1658, Hyojong sent troops again to help the Qing dynasty against Russia. He dispatched 260 Joseon musketeers and cannoneers led by Shin Ryu to join the forces of Ninguta's Military Governor Sarhuda. The joint force sailed down the Hurka and Sungari Rivers and met the Russian troops under the command of an Amur Cossack, Onufrij Stepanov near the fall of the Sungari River into the Amur, killing 270 Russians and driving them out of Manchu territory. The battles against Russia proved that Hyojong's reform had stabilized the Joseon army, although they never put them into action again. Despite the campaigns, Russia and Joseon remained on good terms.

=== Yi In-jwa's Rebellion ===
Yi In-jwa attempted a coup d'état in March 1728 by a coalition of the radical faction of the Namin and the excluded Soron faction. After the death of King Gyeongjong and the ascension of King Yeongjo to the throne, the position of the Noron faction was restored, and Soron, who had instigated the rebellion under the pretext of protecting King Gyeongjong, was punished and excluded from power. Shortly after ascending to the throne, Yeongjo pursued a policy of equal recruitment, believing that factional strife was detrimental to the country's development. In response, the radical faction of the Soron group justified their rebellion by raising suspicions about the circumstances of King Gyeongjong's death and claiming that King Yeongjo was not the legitimate heir of King Sukjong, thereby securing their power. The rebellion began on 15 March when Yi In-jwa captured Cheongju Castle. The rebel forces, marching toward Hanyang (present-day Seoul), were defeated by the royal army, and the support from the Yeongnam and Honam regions was also suppressed by local forces, leading to the suppression of the rebellion.

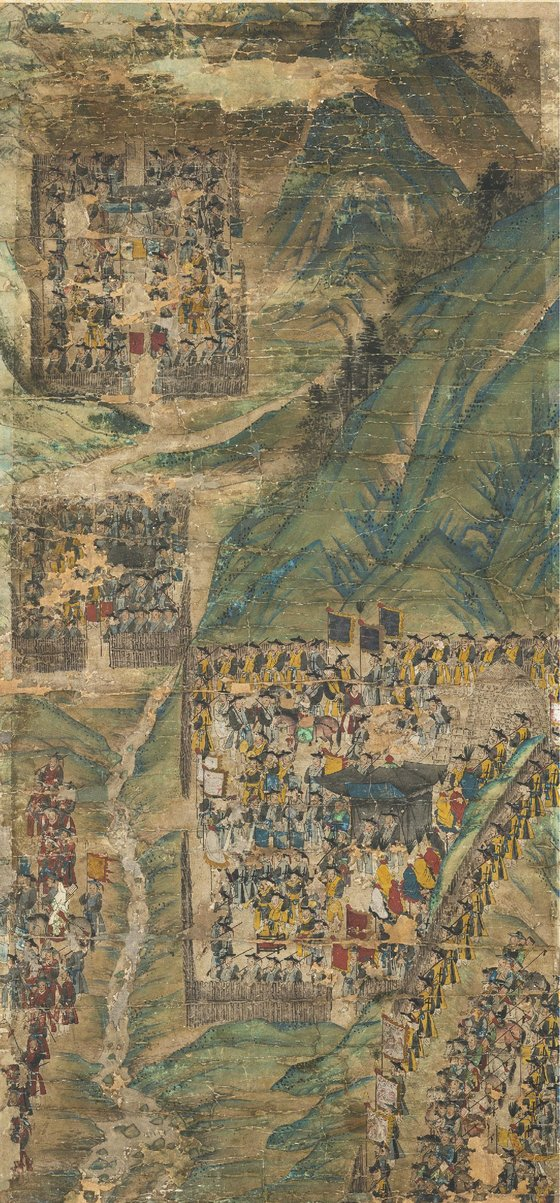
Painting of government soldiers preparing to lay siege to Hong Kyŏngnae's rebels at Jeongju.

=== Hong Kyŏngnae's Rebellion ===
By the 19th century, royal relatives controlled the royal court through weak kings causing the military to weaken further. Hong Kyŏngnae led an insurrection of former Yangban and impoverished farmers who were unhappy with their treatment by the central government and oppressive taxation. At its height, the rebellion controlled most of the area north of the Cheongcheon River, including the fortified town of Jeongju, to withstand invasions from Manchuria (part of the Qing Empire). Whenever the rebels took over a district, they opened the government granaries and distributed the grain to the people. However, the insurgents suffered disastrous defeats in the battles of Pine Grove and Four Pine Field and forced the rebels to withdraw to Jeongju, which came under a two months-long siege by government forces. The rebellion was put down a few months later, on 29 May, when the government forces breached the town wall with a gunpowder charge exploded under the wall through mining. Thousands of people caught up in the uprising, including boys older than 10, were executed. All women and boys under 10 were enslaved. Hong Kyŏngnae died in the fighting. Other rebel leaders were also killed in battle or executed.

=== Foreign incursions and reorganization ===
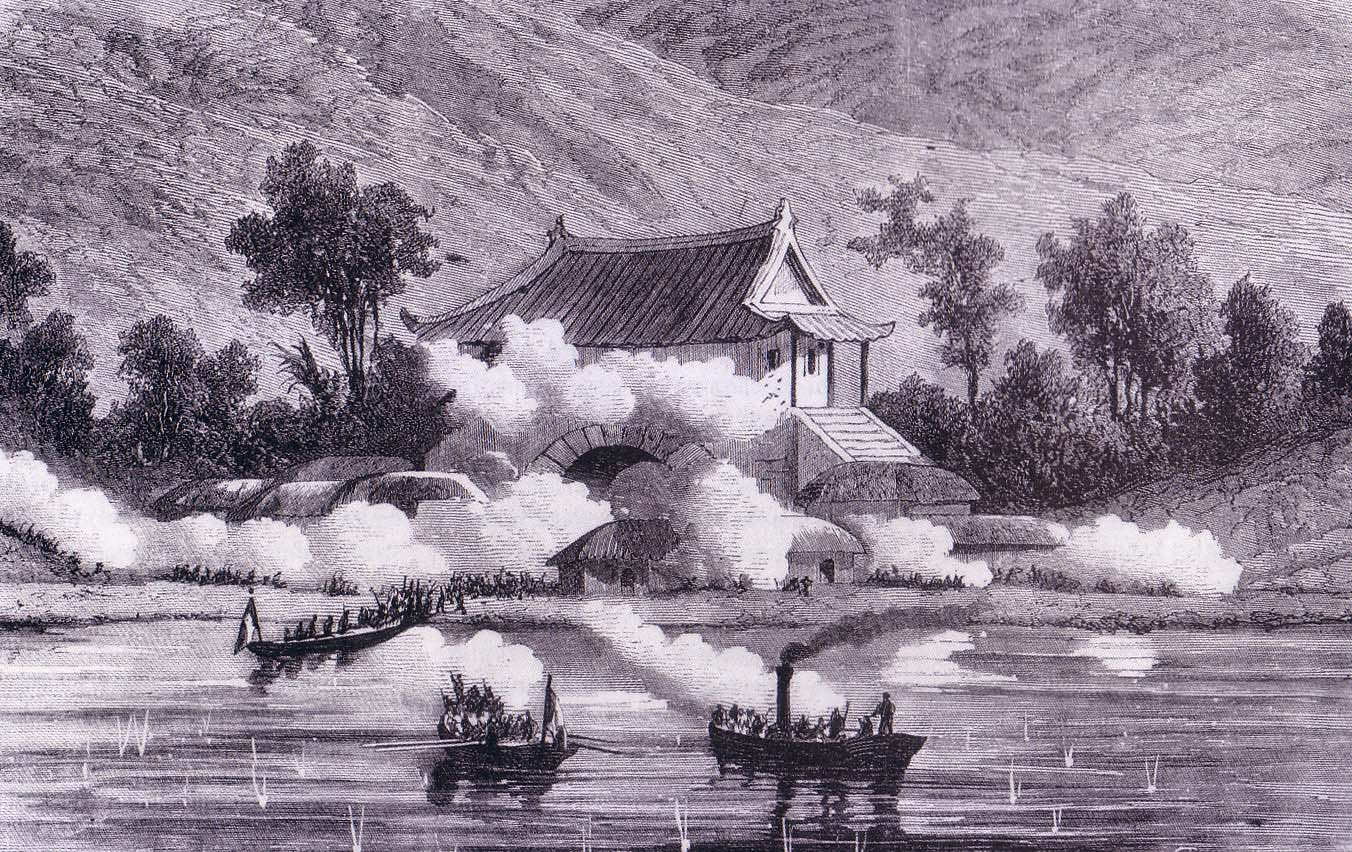
A French landing party engaging the Joseon Army

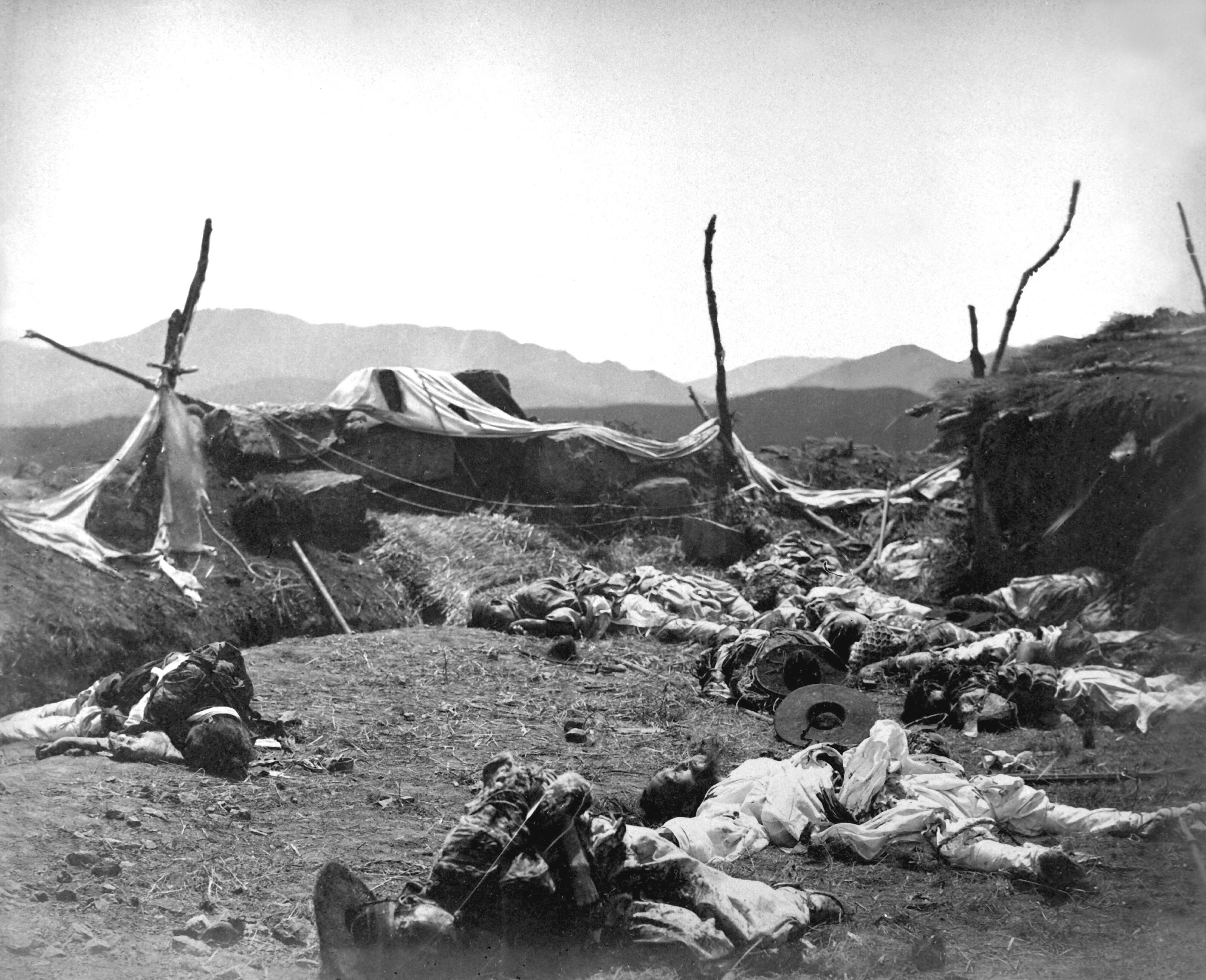
Korean casualties, after the attack on Fort Sondolmok (Fort McKee) by Felice Beato

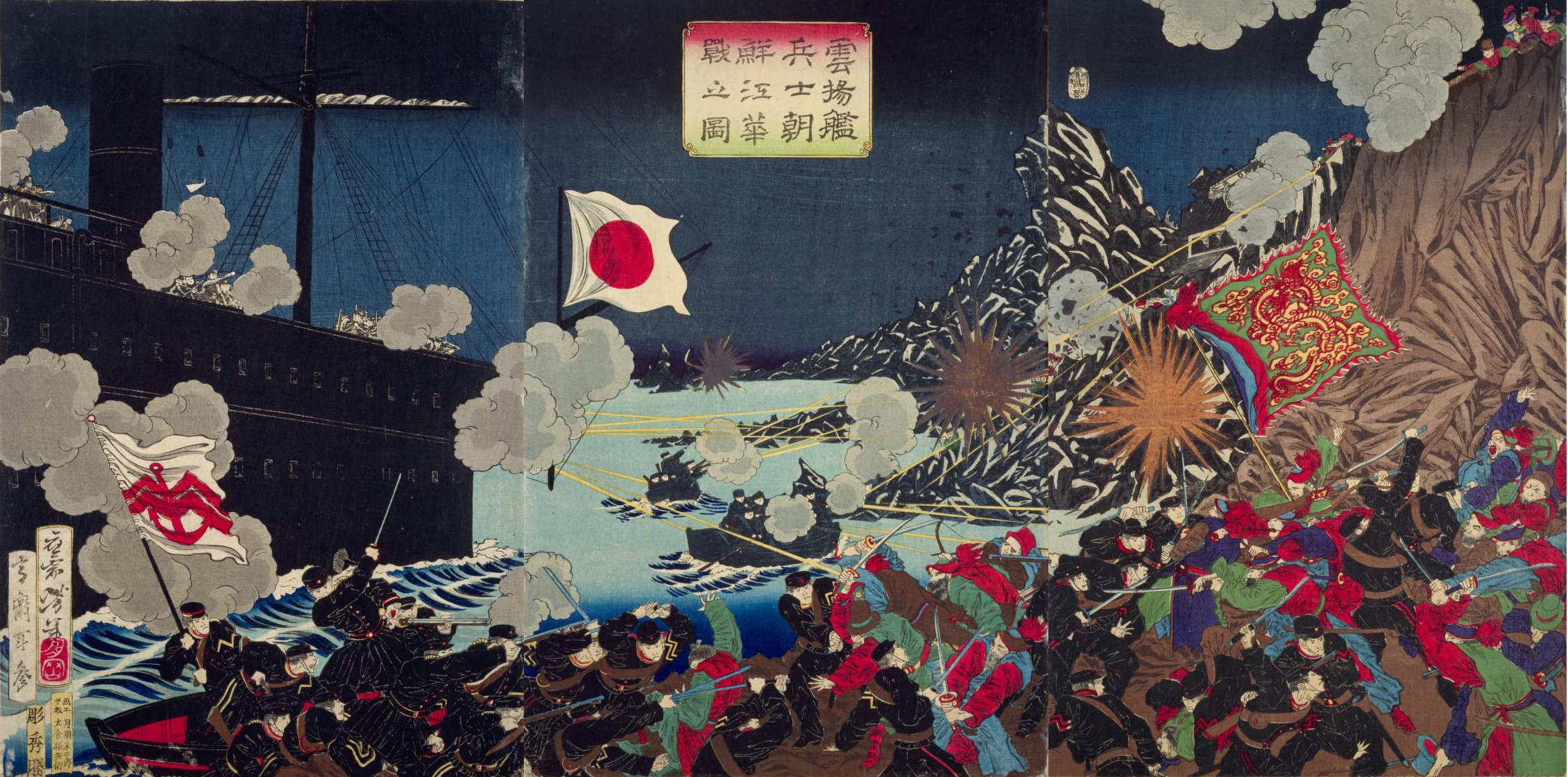
The landing of the forces of the Un'yō at Ganghwa Island. Japanese woodblock print.

Joseon's isolation policies allowed the military to fire on foreign ships. When the USS General Sherman arrived at Ganghwa Island, they requested the government to open for trade, but the army sank their ship and killed their crew. In 1866, the French launched a putative expedition on Ganghwa Island to demand the government release the catholic priests, but were repulsed by the Tiger Hunters. They spearheaded the defense of Ganghwa with the army. The French left during the winter when they received news that the priests had escaped. In 1871, the Americans too launched a putative expedition to demand the government open for trade and apologize for the General Sherman Incident. The Tiger Hunters again spearheaded the defense, but the army and their coastal fortresses did not match their superior firepower. 20 Koreans were captured as bargaining chips for the Americans but released the prisoners before they left after a diplomatic failure. These small victories and foreign diplomatic defeats made the Joseon Army blind to its inferiority to modern armies. Japan plundered and pillaged Ganghwa Island for firing on their gunboat Un'yō, finally forcing them to open doors to the world and modernize the army which will eventually lead to the development of the armed forces of the Korean Empire.

== Organization ==
In early Joseon, the military system consisted of the Five Guards (Owi, 五衛) and the Royal Guard (Geumgun, 禁軍) at the central level, while the Jingwan (鎭管, regional garrison) system was established in the provinces. The Joseon government also attempted to establish the "farmer-soldier system" (byeongnong-ilchi, 兵農一致體制) based on the principle of universal conscription (gungmin gaebyeongje, 國民皆兵制).

However, in practice, this principle was undermined. The yangban aristocracy were effectively exempt from military service, and members of the cheomin (lowest social classes) were excluded except when chosen for certain special units. Thus, the majority of the military consisted of yangin peasant farmers (良人農民). Meanwhile, the central army often included specialized soldiers recruited regardless of the farmer-soldier system.

Their officers in the Joseon army came exclusively from the yangban, and the king appointed them. Still, they valued scholarship over war as something unworthy of a Confucian gentleman-scholar. The quality of Korean generals varies. Some Korean officers being able, and others being men who had not devoted much time to the study of war, preferred archery, writing, practicing their calligraphy, and reading Confucian classics.

The military system of late Joseon can be characterized by the five main military camps (Ogunyeong, 五軍營) and the Royal Guards (Geumgun, 禁軍) in the capital, and by the Sogo Army (속오군,束伍軍) in the provinces. By the late 16th century, the early Joseon military system had nearly ceased functioning. Taking advantage of this weakness, the Japanese invaded, and the urgent need arose to reorganize and reform Joseon’s military institutions. To this end, the authority of the Border Defense Council (Bibyeonsa, 備邊司), which had been established in the 16th century to guard the frontiers, was strengthened.

=== Border Defense Council of Joseon ===
The Border Defense Council of Joseon was a supreme administrative organ established by the central government after the Disturbance of the Three Ports. It allowed the higher military officers, the Jibyeonsa Jaesang (지변사재상; 知邊司宰相), to participate in the process of establishing security maneuvers to meticulously keep a keen eye on the issues of the border.

=== Five Guards ===
Originally, troops of various arms were distributed under the Five Offices and 25 Commands, but the reorganization concentrated each type of troop into one of the Five Guards, thus unifying military functions rather than overall organization.

The Owi (Five Guards) was the central military organization of early and mid-Joseon. Initially, after the dynasty’s founding, the central army inherited the 2 Armies and 6 Guards (igun-yukwi, 二軍六衛) system of late Goryeo, which was repeatedly reorganized into the 10 Guards (十衛), 10 Offices (十司), and 12 Offices (十二司). By 1451 it was consolidated into five commands and in 1457 this structure was formalized as the Owi. In 1469 (1st year of King Yejong), after further adjustments, the system was codified in the Gyeongguk Daejeon (National Code) under the authority of the Headquarters of the Five Guards (owi dochongbu, 五衛都摠府). This was based on Goryeo’s traditional "Five Army Battle Formation" (ogunjinbeop, 五軍陣法) and strengthened into a coherent structure.

Each of the Five Guards consisted of five divisions (bu, 部), with one division based in Seoul and the others made up of provincial garrison forces. For example:

- Uiheung Guard (義興衛, Central Guard): composed of elite armored troops (gapsa, 甲士) and supplementary troops.
- Yongyang Guard (龍驤衛, Left Guard): included special palace guards (byeolsiwi, 別侍衛).
- Hobun Guard (虎賁衛, Right Guard): included royal relatives’ guard units and close royal guard units.
- Chungjwa Guard (忠佐衛, Forward Guard): included loyalist and enemy-breaking units.
- Chungmu Guard (忠武衛, Rear Guard): included regular soldiers and brave warrior units.

Troops were organized into 13 types of units, which fell into three categories:

- Status-based privileged units (royal relatives, descendants of meritorious officials, high-ranking bureaucrats’ sons, etc.).
- Skill-based units (selected by martial arts examinations regardless of social status, e.g., gapsa, byeolsiwi, janggo wi).
- Duty-based peasant soldiers (ordinary peasant farmers fulfilling conscription, e.g., jeongbyeong, 正兵).

This system applied to both central and provincial armies. Higher units were built in multiples of five, reaching the nationwide Five Guards = 25 Divisions = 100 Commands (tong, 統). However, ranks were not standardized, since unit membership was tied to social status rather than a professional rank hierarchy.

The Owi combined standing troops like the Gapsa (armored soldiers), special guard units, and the regular conscript soldiers (jeongbyeong) formed the core under a rotation system, aligning both peacetime garrisons and wartime formations. Each guard oversaw specific regions of the capital and provinces, ensuring nationwide mobilization. At its peak, it fielded around 5,500 core soldiers plus auxiliary forces and maintained a complex officer hierarchy. However, by the late 16th century, the Owi weakened due to the spread of tax-in-lieu-of-service practices and was effectively replaced after the Imjin War (1592–1598) by the new Five Army Commands (Oguneong), leaving the Owi largely nominal.

=== Jeseungbangryak system ===
As service burdens grew, desertions increased. From the mid-15th century, the commutation system (Banggun Supoje, 放軍收布制) allowed men to pay cloth tax instead of serving, weakening the army. The state then adopted the Jesung Bangryak (制勝方略) strategy: during emergencies, all local troops gathered to resist under generals sent from the capital. It allowed the military commanders from the central government to control assembled troops from the main army to the local and provincial armies. But, local officers could not individually respond to a foreign invasion outside their jurisdiction until a higher ranking general, appointed by the king's court, arrived with a newly mobilized army. It was a highly inefficient arrangement since the nearby forces would remain stationary until the mobile border commander arrived on the scene and took control. Secondly, as the appointed General often came from an outside region. The general was unlikely unfamiliar with the natural environment, the available technology, and staffing of the invaded region. Finally, as the government never maintained the main army, new and ill-trained recruits conscripted during war constituted a significant part of the army.

=== Army units ===
In the Joseon Army, there are army units between the Jeon-gi (前期, "pre-period") and Hu-gi (後期, "post-period"). Jeon-gi is based on the Owi (오위) system established during the Munjong period.

Army units of the Jeon-gi
Hangul	Hanja	Romanization	English	Description
위	衛	Wi	Corps	A corps-level unit consisting of five Bu units. It is similar to the current division. The commander is called "Wijang" (위장), a 2nd-rank officer.
부	部	Bu	Division	A division-level unit consisting of four Tong units. It is similar to the current brigade or division within a division. The commander is called "Bujang" (부장), equivalent to the rank of 6th-rank officer.
통	哨	Tong	Regiment	A regiment-level unit consisting of five Yeo units. It is similar to the current battalion, and the commander is called "Tongjang" (통장).
여	旅	Yeo	Battalion	A battalion-level unit consisting of five Dae units. It is similar to the current company. The commander is called "Yeosu" (여수), an officer of the 8th rank specializing in cavalry or infantry, often promoted from the ranks.
대	隊	Dae	Company	A company-level unit consisting of five O units. The commander is called "Daejeong" (대정), a non-commissioned officer of the administrative class. The deputy commander is called "Daebu" (대부), a non-commissioned officer of the administrative class specializing in physical training. It is similar to a current platoon.
오	伍	O	Section	The section-level unit consisting of five squads. The commander is called "Ojang" (오장), and Ojang is a non-commissioned officer.
조	卒	jo	Squad	The lowest-level unit consisting of five soldiers. The commander is called "Jojang" (오장), and Jojang is a non-commissioned officer.

Army units of the Hu-gi
Hangul	Hanja	Romanization	English	Description
영	營	Yang	Corps	A corps-level unit consisting of five Bu or five Sa units. The former corresponds to the current division, and the latter corresponds to the current regiment. The commander is called "Daejang" (대장), or "Sa" (사). Under the commander, there is a deputy commander and chief of staff equivalent to a senior staff officer, called "Junggun" (중군). The central corps belonged to the Ogunyeong (오군영) and received orders from the Daejang and Sa, while the regional corps belonged to the respective regional military commands or camps and received orders from the local officials or military officers.
부	部	Bu	Division	A division-level unit consisting of five Sa units. It is similar to the current division. The commander is called "Cheonchong" (천총). It was not widely seen in the So'o Army and was mostly seen in the O Army.
사	司	Sa	Regiment	A regiment-level unit consisting of five Cho units. It is similar to the current battalion. The commander is called "Pachong" (파총). Pachong could be either an officer or a civilian official. In some cases, local officials in charge of military affairs in a specific area were appointed as Pachong, such as the case of the commander of the military forces in a county. In such cases, they were referred to as "gyeompachong" (겸파총), meaning "dual Pachong." In reality, the commanders of the Anyeongcheong and Geumwiyeong were appointed as gyeompachong and led the troops.
초	哨	Cho	Battalion	A battalion-level unit consisting of three Gi units. It is similar to the current company. The commander is called "Chogwan" (초관), a non-commissioned officer of the 9th rank.
기	旗	Gi	Company	A company-level unit consisting of three Dae units. It is similar to the current squad. The commander is called "Gichong" (기총), an 8th-rank officer specializing in administration. The Gichong is also someone who has been promoted from the ranks.
대	隊	Dae	Platoon	A platoon-level unit consisting of one Hwabyeong (화병, military police) and 10 regular soldiers, commanded by a "Daejang" (대장). The Daejang is an 8th-rank officer and is usually someone who has been promoted from the ranks.
오	伍	O	Fire Team	A unit consists of 5 men led by an "Ojang" (오장), and an Ojang is a non-commissioned officer.

=== Ranks ===
The highest rank of the army was the Dowonsu (都元帥). The Commander in chief of all 8 provinces' armed forces. A temporary rank, the rank that commanded the local army. The scope of the command is flexible. Although it was the highest rank, it is said that the number of troops that Dowonsu could actually command was considerably small due to the temporary performance that was only permanent during wartime and the command system that was not unified into one. The second highest rank was the Samdo Sunbyonsa, the Commander of three provinces – Kyongsang, Cholla and Chung Chong. The third highest rank was the Sunbyonsa, a provincial commander. The fourth highest rank was the Pangosa: a county commander defending strategic points.

Army Ranks of the Jeon-gi
Hangul	Hanja	Romanization	English	Description
위장	衛	Wijang	General	A 2nd-rank officer that leads five Bu units.
부장	部	Bujang	Colonel	A 6th-rank officer that leads four tong units.
통장	哨	Tongjang	Major	An officer that leads five Yeo units.
여수	旅	Yeosu	Captain	An officer of the 8th rank specializing in cavalry or infantry, often promoted from the ranks leading five Dae units.
대정	隊	Daejeong	Sergeant	A Non-commissioned administrative officer that leads five O units. The deputy commander is called "Daebu" (대부), another non-commissioned officer of the administrative class specializing in physical training.
오장	伍	Ojang	Corporal	A non-commissioned officer leading of five soldiers. The commander is called "Ojang" (오장), and Ojang is a non-commissioned officer.

Army units of the Hu-gi
Hangul	Hanja	Romanization	English	Description
대장/사	大將/史	Daejang/Sa	General	An officer that leads five Bu or five Sa units. A deputy commander and chief of staff equivalent to a senior staff officer, called "Junggun" (중군).
천총	千摠	Cheonchong	Brigadier General	An officer that leads five Sa units.
파총	把摠	Pachong	Colonel	An officer that leads five Cho units. In such cases, they were referred to as "gyeompachong" (겸파총), meaning "dual Pachong." In reality, the commanders of the Anyeongcheong and Geumwiyeong were appointed as gyeompachong and led the troops.
초관	哨官	Chogwan	Major	A non-commissioned officer of the 9th rank leading three Gi units.
기총	旗槍	Gichong	Captain	An 8th-rank officer specializing in administration leading three Dae units. The Gichong is also someone who has been promoted from the ranks.
대정	隊	Daejeong	Sergeant	An 8th-rank officer and is usually someone who has been promoted from the ranks that leads one Hwabyeong (화병, military police) and 10 regular soldiers.
오장	伍	Ojang	Corporal	A non-commissioned officer leading of five soldiers. The commander is called "Ojang" (오장), and Ojang is a non-commissioned officer.

== Royal Guard ==
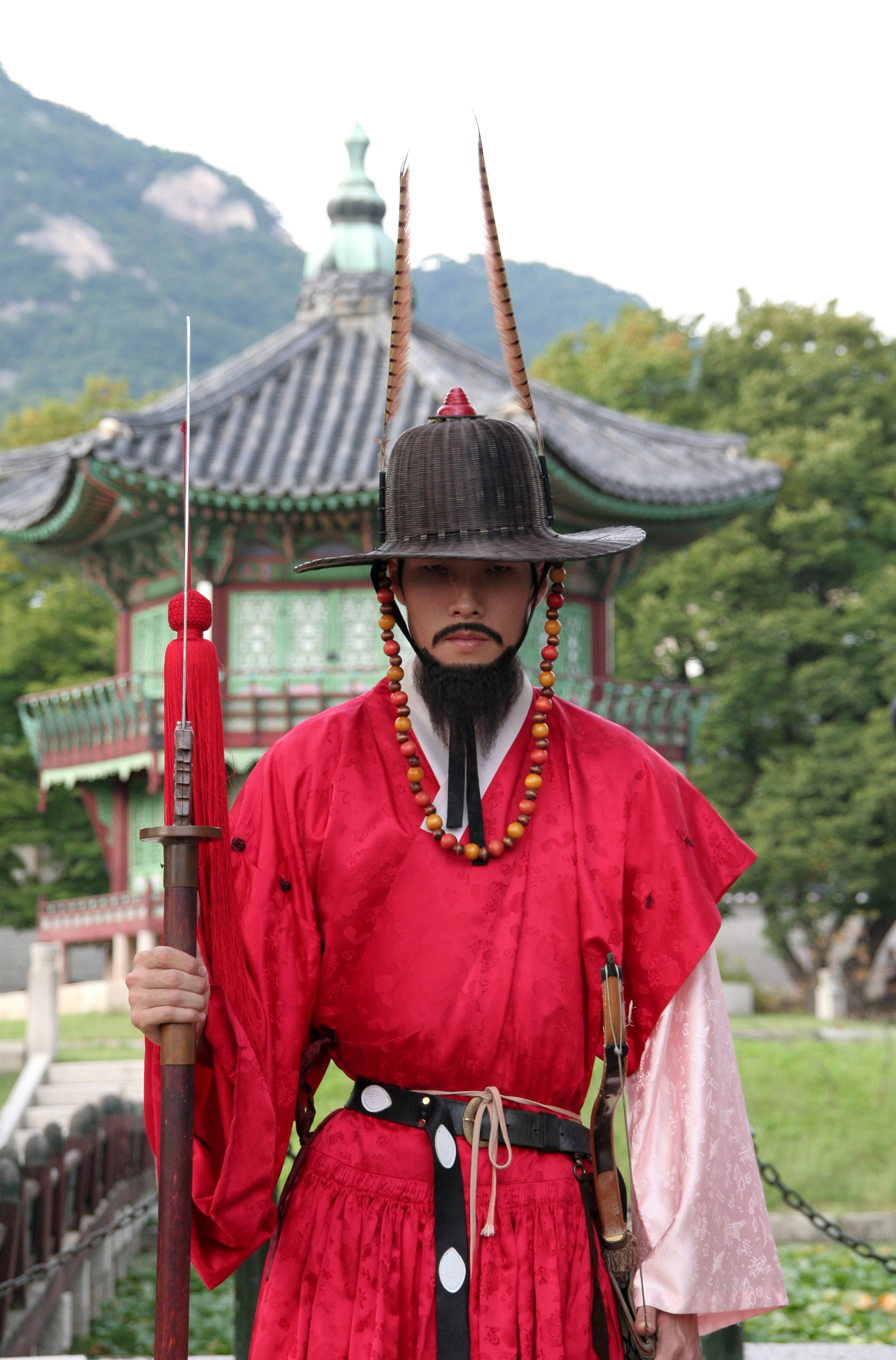
Korean royal guard at Gyeongbokgung Palace during a re-enactment

The Royal Guards of the Joseon Dynasty were an elite group of soldiers responsible for protecting the King and the royal family and defending the Geumjung (禁裏) (or Geumjung (禁中), the king's residence. They number up to 50–200 men tasked with guarding the palace and escorting the king. All were rigorously selected through martial arts tests, served without rotation, and received full stipends. These were under commanders called "inner generals" (naejang, 內將). They were divided into several different units, each with their own specific responsibilities. The Naegeumwi (內禁衛, Royal Inner Guards), founded in 1407, began as a small palace corps of 60–90 men but grew into 190 permanent guards supported by reserves, drawn mostly from yangban through strict exams, and served as the backbone of palace defense, though often also dispatched to frontier duty. The Gyemsabok (兼司僕, Mounted Guards), reorganized in 1464 from earlier mounted guard traditions, were an elite cavalry unit that prioritized martial skill over birth, allowing not only aristocrats but also secondary sons, commoners, outcasts, defected foreigners, and even Japanese to enlist if they passed rigorous tests; they enjoyed high ranks, land stipends, privileges, and opportunities for advancement. The Urimwi (羽林衛, Feathered Forest Guard), established in 1492 as a supplementary unit for marginalized aristocrats (illegitimate aristocratic offspring) to expand opportunities and compensate for guard shortages, numbered 50 permanent soldiers with official ranks and stipends, ranking below the Naegeumwi and Gyemsabok but above regular armored infantry, and though briefly abolished, were reinstated and later integrated into the Royal Guards Command. Together, these three corps—embodied both the exclusivity and adaptability of Joseon’s royal security system, balancing rigid hierarchy with avenues for social mobility through martial service. The Howicheong (扈衛廳) was created in 1623 after King Injo’s Restoration, essentially as a private guard for the coup leaders. Over time it grew into three divisions with over 1,000 officers, but under King Jeongjo (r. 1776–1800) it was reduced and reorganized into a loyal royal guard. Other temporary guard units (e.g., Cheongrodae, Jeonglowi) were also formed to reinforce royal authority.

=== Restriction Guard ===
In 1666, King Hyeongjong established the Restriction Guard (Geumgun) by integrating the Naegeumwi, Gyeomsabok, Woorimwi and the Jungrowi into the Office of the Restriction Guards (Geumguncheong). The Restriction Guard, also known as Geumgun in Korean, were a select group of highly trained soldiers who served as the personal bodyguards of the Joseon Dynasty's royal family. They were responsible for protecting the king and his immediate family members, as well as important government officials and palaces. The Restriction Guard members were selected from the most skilled and loyal soldiers in the kingdom. They underwent rigorous training in martial arts, archery, horseback riding, and other combat skills. In addition to their combat training, the Restriction Guard also received education in Confucianism, the dominant philosophy of the time. The members of the Restriction Guard were distinguished by their distinctive black uniforms and their use of black horses. They were also equipped with special weapons, such as the geom, a type of Korean sword, and the gakgung, a type of Korean bow. The Restriction Guard played an important role in maintaining order and stability within the kingdom, and they were known for their loyalty to the royal family and their willingness to sacrifice their lives in defense of the throne.

The Office of the Restriction Guards, also known as Geumguncheong in Korean, was the administrative headquarters of the Restriction Guard during the Joseon Dynasty. It was responsible for overseeing the training, deployment, and management of the Restriction Guard. The Geumguncheong was located within the palace complex and was headed by a high-ranking government official known as the Geumgunjang, who was appointed by the king. The Geumgunjang was responsible for overseeing the day-to-day operations of the Restriction Guard and ensuring that it fulfilled its duties and responsibilities.

The Geumguncheong was also responsible for managing the finances of the Restriction Guard, including its budget for weapons, equipment, and supplies. In addition, it played a key role in coordinating with other government agencies to maintain law and order within the kingdom. The Geumguncheong was an important institution in the Joseon Dynasty, as the Restriction Guard played a critical role in maintaining the stability of the kingdom and protecting the royal family.

=== Dragon Tiger Guard ===
In 1755, King Yeongjo renamed the Restriction Guard into the Dragon Tiger Guard (Yonghoyeong); its total number of members increased to 700. It was a special military unit in the Joseon Dynasty that was responsible for protecting the royal palace and the king's person. The name "Yonghoyeong" means "dragon tiger guard" and refers to the two mythical creatures that were believed to symbolize strength and power. Its members were selected from the most skilled soldiers in the kingdom. They underwent rigorous training in martial arts, archery, and other combat skills, as well as in the use of firearms, which were introduced to Korea during this period. The Dragon Tiger Guard was distinguished by its distinctive red uniforms and its use of red banners and flags. Its members were also equipped with special weapons, such as matchlock muskets and bamboo spears. The Dragon Guard played a critical role in maintaining the security of the royal palace and the king's person, as well as in suppressing rebellions and maintaining law and order throughout the kingdom. Its members were known for their bravery, loyalty, and martial prowess, and they were considered to be among the most elite soldiers in the Joseon Dynasty.

=== Royal Elite Camp ===
In 1793, King Jeongjo established the Royal Elite Camp (Jangyongyeong). It was briefly an inner-outer guard system intended to serve as a standing army that could be deployed quickly to defend the kingdom in times of crisis. The Jangyongyeong Guard was named after a famous military treatise written during Goryeo, which emphasized the importance of military training and discipline. The soldiers in the Jangyongyeong Guard underwent rigorous training in martial arts, archery, and other combat skills, and they were equipped with modern firearms, such as muskets and rifles. Unlike the Restriction Guard and the Dragon Guard, which were composed of soldiers from the aristocracy, the Jangyongyeong Guard was open to commoners who demonstrated exceptional martial skills and loyalty to the king. This was a significant departure from the traditional social hierarchy of Joseon, which placed a premium on aristocratic birth and education. The Jangyongyeong Guard also played a role in suppressing domestic rebellions and maintaining law and order throughout the kingdom. The establishment of the Jangyongyeong Guard was one of King Jeongjo's most significant military reforms, and it helped to modernize and strengthen Joseon's military capabilities. This unit disbanded under King Sunjo as royal authority weakened.

=== Wanggung Sumunjang ===
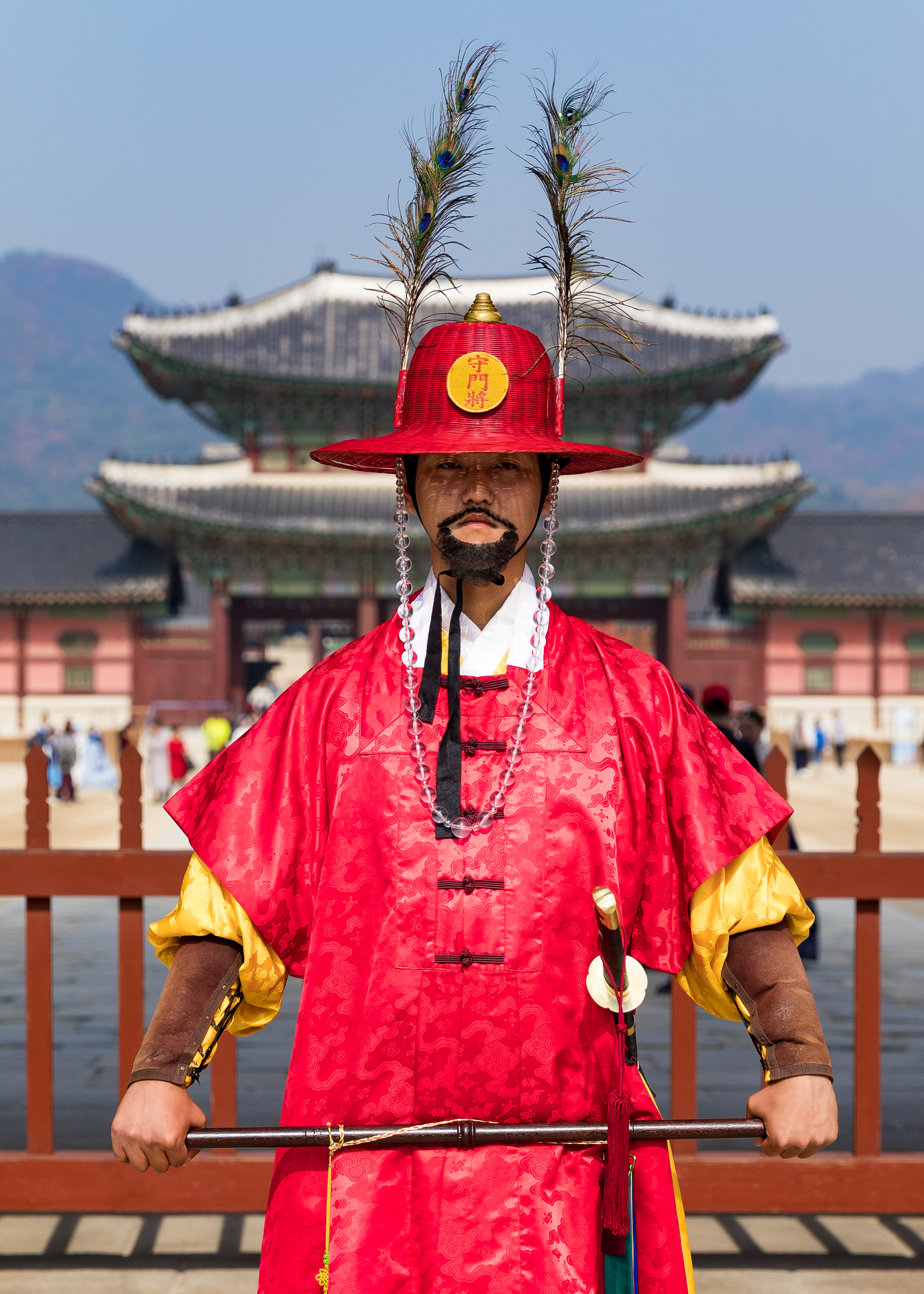
Sumunjang (수문장), Chief gatekeeper of the royal palaces gates.

In the Joseon dynasty, the Sumunjang (守門將, Gate Commander) was the official responsible for guarding the gates of the capital and royal palaces. Initially, this duty rotated among the officers (Hogun, 護軍) of the Five Guards, but in 1469 (King Yejong’s reign), the position was formally established as a separate office held by western military officials (Seoban) of rank 4 or higher, chosen through a recommendation and royal selection system. Although originally limited to just 20 officials, the number swelled to as many as 430 during the Imjin War, reflecting wartime needs. Because there were few 4th-rank or higher military officials available, many Sumunjang were also drawn from units such as the Chunguiwi (Loyalty Guard), Chungchanwi (Meritorious Guard), or Jokchinwi (Royal Relatives Guard). Sumunjang took turns standing watch at palace gates, opening or closing them under orders verified by a royal token (Pyosin), though some were criticized for neglecting their night duties. After the Imjin War, palace security was tightened, and under King Yeongjo, the Sokdaejeon codified Sumunjang as a permanent official post, with a dedicated office called the Sumunjangcheong (守門將廳). By this time, there were 23 positions (5 of rank 6 and 18 of rank 9), which later increased to 29 under the Daejeon Hoetong. In addition, there were separate "palace-specific" Sumunjang assigned to royal shrines such as Jogyeongmyo in Jeonju, Gyeonggijeon, and Seonwonjeon, each staffed by a ninth-rank officer. This system institutionalized the role of gate commanders as a key component of palace and state security in Joseon.

== Central Army ==
Capital Defense Standing Army (수도 방어 상비군)
Hanyang, Gyeonggido	Escort Office (호위청)	1,000	45,000
Hanyang, Gyeonggido	Royal Guards Command (어영청)	6,200	45,000
Hanyang, Gyeonggido	Command of the Northern Approaches (총융청)	2,000	45,000
Hanyang, Gyeonggido	Military Training Command (훈련도감)	5,000	45,000
Hanyang, Gyeonggido	Royal Defense Command (수어청)	12,700	45,000

King Taejo established the central army (Gyeonggun) in 1392, and his army, which overthrew the Goryeo dynasty, served as its basis. In 1393, he established the Three Armies Headquarters (Ŭihŭng Samgunbu). It was the primary military force in the early Joseon Dynasty and had about 16,000 men initially, but in 1448 it was increased to about 28,000 men. The headquarters was renamed the Five Military Commands (Owi, 오위; 五衛) by King Sejo, making it the basis of the central army. After the Imjin War, King Seonjo replaced the Five Commands for its ineffectiveness with the Five Military Camps (ogunyeong, 오군영; 五軍營) and the Escort Office (Howicheong) to defend the capital and the Gyeonggi Province. Adding to the central army was the Special Military Direct Office (Byeolgunjigcheong).

=== Pengbaesu ===
Pengbaesu (팽배수/彭排手), heavy infantry specializing in hand-to-hand combat, were the mainstay of early Joseon infantry. They fought in mountain warfare, and in the plains, they built a shield wall to deter the cavalry's attacks. Originally, it referred to a shield and was used as a weapon. In the early stages, shields and spears were used interchangeably. During the early Joseon Dynasty, the traditional cavalry soldiers (馬兵甲士) were assigned the role of shield troops. Then, in 1415 (15th year of King Taejong's reign), a military unit called "Bange" (방패) was established and formalized, with officers and deputy officers. The spearmen were initially composed of highly skilled soldiers, but by the time of the establishment of the "Gyeongguk Daejeon" (경국대전), they were transformed into labor troops, including those employed in construction work. As it was a unit that handled heavy weapons like shields, soldiers were selected based on running and strength rather than martial arts. However, as naturally strong spearmen were employed as laborers, there was a phenomenon where respectable soldiers avoided being categorized as such, leading to a gradual decline in their social status, and they were eventually organized as "Sinryangeokcheon" (신량역천) or "Cheonin," becoming one of the most difficult forms of labor. The unit consisted of 5,000 soldiers who served in shifts of 5 groups for 4 months each. The actual number of soldiers serving at any given time was always 1,000. They were provided with 1 bo (保), which is equivalent to 2 jeong, and during their service, they were assigned to miscellaneous positions below the rank of 8th grade.

=== Gapsa ===
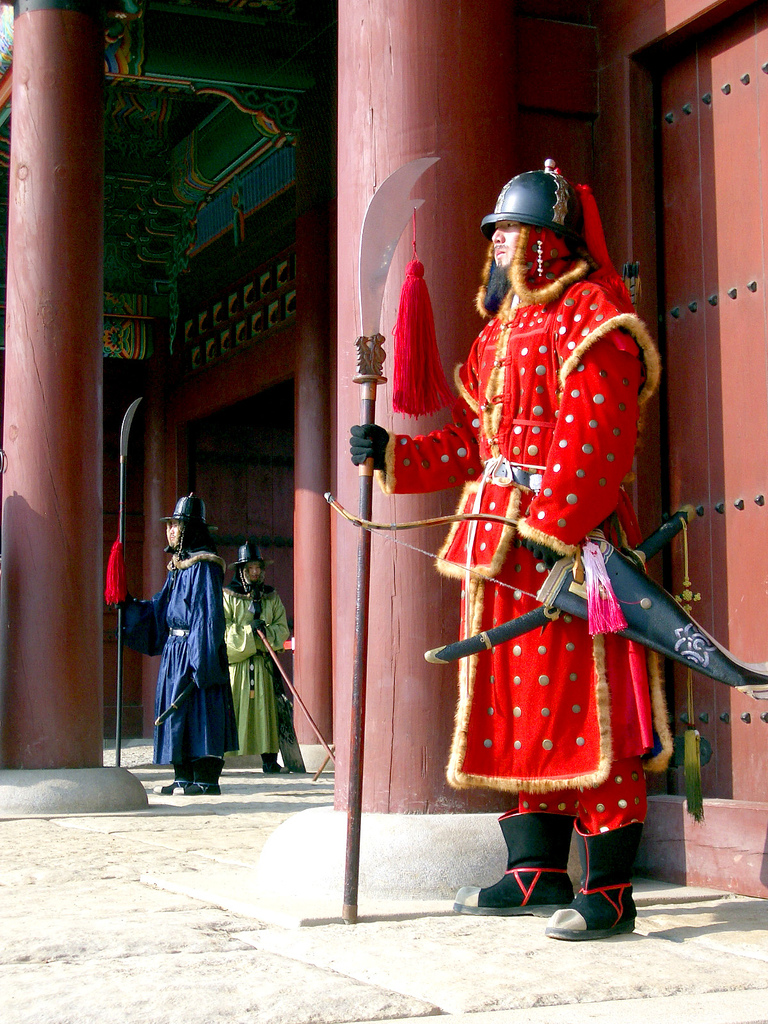
Gapsa (갑사) standing guard wearing dudumiggap armor (두두미갑; 頭頭味甲).

The Gapsa (Armored Soldiers) were elite troops belonging to the Uihungwi (Central Guard) under the Joseon dynasty’s Owi system. Although the title existed in Goryeo, it became institutionalized in 1401 under King Taejong as a permanent, state-supported unit responsible for royal guard duties. They served both as palace guards in Seoul and as frontier defense forces, with special divisions such as the border Gapsa (Yanggye Gapsa) and the tiger-hunting Gapsa (Chakho Gapsa). Entry into the corps was highly selective: most came from wealthy or noble families, as mounted Gapsa had to provide their own horses, but even yangban youths and commoners could qualify through examinations if they displayed strong physique, martial skill, and good appearance. During Sejong’s reign, strict recruitment tests were formalized, requiring height, strength, and martial ability, though by King Seongjong’s time standards relaxed as their numbers swelled. Originally capped at about 2,000, their ranks expanded rapidly to 7,500 by the late 15th century and nearly 15,000 by the Gyeongguk Daejeon, though only 1,000–2,000 were on active rotation at a time. Gapsa held official military ranks within the broader bureaucracy, though unlike other officers they received pay only while on duty. Promotion was based on service records, and exceptional soldiers could rise to posts like manho (commander) or even county magistrate. Initially spread across various units, after the military reorganization of 1457 they became permanently attached to the Uihungwi, cementing their role as the backbone of the central military guard of Joseon.

=== Five Army Camps ===
The Five Army Camps (ogunyeong, (오군영)) defended Hanseong and the surrounding fortresses primarily in Gyeonggi Province. Each king established one or more camps during their reign. The ogunyeong started in September 1593 as a single military camp when King Seonjo and Ryu Seong-Ryong established the Military Training Agency (Hunlyeondogam, 훈련도감, alternately translated as Military Training Command). The agency carefully divided the army into units and companies. The companies had archers, arquebusiers, sworders, and spear infantry squads. The agency set up army divisions in each region of Korea and garrisoned battalions at castles. The upper-class citizens and enslaved people were subject to the draft. All males had to enter military service to be trained and familiarized with weapons. It was also around this time that the military scholar Han Gyo (한교) wrote the martial arts manual Muyejebo, based on the book Jixiao Xinshu by the famous Chinese General Qi Jiguang. The agency initially had less than 80 troops and soon grew to about 10,000. In 1622–1624, Injo established three more camps to counter the Qing invasions after Yi Gwal's rebellion, the Royal Guard Command (Eoyeongcheong), Command of the Northern Approaches (Chongyungcheong), and the Royal Defence Command (Sueocheong). The Royal Guards Command had 260 artillery troops to defend the city walls of Hanseong and suppress rebellions. It grew to 7,000 troops after the Qing invasion, and during Hyojong's reign, 21,000 troops. The Command of the Northern Approaches defended the northern outskirts of Hanseong through the Bukhansanseong Fortress with 23,500 soldiers. The Royal Defense Command defended the south of Hanseong through Namhanseong Fortress with 16,500 troops. Sukjeong established the Capital Garrison (Geumwiyeong) to defend Hanyang and escort the king with 85,000 soldiers. Among them are 30,000 professional soldiers based on the military elements from the other four military camps. It was reassigned as an independent army by King Yeongjo.

==== Office of Martial Arts Guards ====
The Muyecheong (武藝廳, Office of Martial Arts Guards), also called Muye Byeolgam (武藝別監) or Mugam (武監), was a Joseon dynasty military office responsible for guarding the king. Established in 1630 (King Injo, year 8) with an initial roster of 30 men under the authority of the Hunryeondogam (Training Command), it drew its personnel from cavalry, infantry, and special units, expanding to 198 men by 1802 (King Sunjo, year 2). In 1781 (King Jeongjo, year 5), the force was divided into two companies, each led by one commander and subdivided into five units of about ten soldiers each, with leadership assigned during drills to acting captains called haengsu byeolgam. Within the corps, the Daeryeong Muyecheong (待令武藝廳) consisted of 46 men and the Garyeong Muyecheong (假待令武藝廳) of 40, both wearing red uniforms and carrying swords while on duty. Another 87 men of the Mun Muyecheong (門武藝廳) guarded palace gates, dressed in red robes (hongcheollik) with yellow grass hats adorned with tiger whiskers; two-thirds carried guns while the rest held truncheon-like weapons called samneungjang. During grand court assemblies, when armored guards (gapsa) escorted the king, those carrying truncheons switched to decorated staves, and when accompanying the royal procession outside the palace, unit leaders wore military uniforms with swords only. Additional specialized divisions included the Namyeo Muyecheong (藍輿武藝廳, 19 men), Guhumuyecheong (九帿武藝廳, 4 men), and Hwabyeong Muyecheong (火兵武藝廳, 2 men), who wore black uniforms but otherwise followed the same ceremonial dress as the gate guards. Altogether, this organization formed a highly structured body of elite martial guards dedicated to the king’s protection. In 1894, the Martial Arts Department disbanded after the Gabo Reforms and the Eulmi Incident as part of the military reforms leading to the establishment of the Imperial Korean Armed Forces.

==== Three Military Garrisons ====
The Three Military Garrisons (Samgunyeong, 삼군영; 三軍營) was a central military camp formed during the development of the capital defense system in the late Joseon Dynasty. It consists of the Military Training Agency, the Royal Guards Command, and the Capital Garrison. The soldiers of the Three Military Garrisons lived in Hanyang and played a key role in guarding the king, guarding the palace, defending the capital, and maintaining public order.

== Provincial Army ==
The Joseon Government established various defense systems to set up provincial armies and raise militias and coordinate the central army. Initially, outside the northern frontier, the provinces were defended by the Land Defense Army (yuksugun, 陸守軍) – conscripts rotated into capital guard duty or stationed at fortresses. In the provinces, the Sogo Army (속오군) emerged after the Imjin War. The old Jingwan (鎭管) system was restored, but new reforms introduced the Yeongjang system (營將制度), which separated military authority from the civil magistrates. Northern provinces (Pyeongan, Hamgyong) retained Goryeo's Ik Army (ikgun, 翼軍) system, organized around strategic regions, with conscripts serving in their localities rather than rotating to distant garrisons.

=== Jingwan system ===
The Jingwan system was a provincial defense system that dates back to the Goryeo dynasty. From 1455 (King Sejo’s reign), large fortresses (jin, 鎭) were established inland, forming the Jingwan system in 1458. Each province was divided into main garrisons (jujin, 主鎭), large fortresses (geojin, 巨鎭), and sub-garrisons (jin, 鎭). Provincial military governors (byeongma jeoldosa) commanded land forces. Still, it leaves some parts of the nations open to invasion, and if one falls, it will be catastrophic in any war. In 1457 AD, King Sejo reshuffled the defense system to secure as many defensive fortresses as possible to enhance the defensive depth. It comprises a Jujin, the main fortress commanded by a Byeongsa, a provincial military commander who takes a regional defense and orders lower unit commanders. A Geojin, a medium-sized local administrative unit commanded by a Byeongmajeoljesa or Cheomjeoljesa (Geojin Military Commander) between the provincial capital and small local towns called Jejins, who are commanded by the chief local magistrates who often doubled as garrison commanders, or a military commander. Using this strategic composition, a Jingwan fights and defend their provinces, and every province has several independent Jingwans. Under this system, the roles of local commanders were to be stationed at their post, know the local topography inside and out, draft the operation plan, train local soldiers, and defend their defensive quarter by mobilizing their local soldiers in the case of conflict. However, when there was a massive invasion, there were not enough soldiers to defend their provinces as it was also a dispersed-force defense system. It requires the concentrated use of forced local forces to defend their defense perimeters, and the Bupiljeoktajinjijobeob rule prevents provinces from coming to each other's aid. Local magistrates, being civil officials often lacked military expertise. They requested military commanders from the central government who did not know a familiar province's terrain. By 1464, all provincial troops were standardized as jeongbyeong (regular soldiers). These soldiers served locally but also rotated to the capital for guard duty. The estimated total provincial force under the Jingwan system was 500,000–600,000 men.

Northwestern Frontier Provincial Deployment Army (서북병 배치 지방군)
P'yŏngando	Cheongcheon River Provincial Army (청천강 지방군)	4,000	7,600
Hwanghaedo	Hwanghaedo Army (황해도 군)	2,000	7,600
Chungcheongdo; Jeollado; Gyeongsangdo	Hasangdo Army (하상도 군)	1,600	7,600

Royal Provincial Army (각지 근왕병)
P'yŏngando	P'yŏngando Royal Army (평안도 근왕병)	5,000	35,000
Chungcheongdo	Chungcheongdo Royal Army (충청도 근왕병)	7,000	35,000
Gangwondo	Gangwondo Royal Army (황해도 근왕병)	7,000	35,000
Jeollado	Jeollado Royal Army (전라도 근왕병)	8,000	35,000
Gyeongsangdo	Gyeongsangdo Royal Army (하상도 근왕병)	8,000	35,000

=== Sogo system ===
Seonjo established the Sogo system in 1593, a militia system during the Imjin war based on the Ming Chinese militia system and military texts. He believed a communal nature of the defense forces would prevent the populace from deserting and allow the country to respond more quickly to invasions. Under this system, county magistrates or army commanders organized all families of the Joseon Society from villages and counties into militia armies with hierarchical command structures. They have access to the resources for maintaining and rewarding the soldiers. Five households each contributed a man to form the basic unit, an o. The o’s in a village or town were progressively amalgamated and arranged into eleven-man squads (tae) including a squad leader (taech’ong), three-squad banners (ki), three-banner companies (ch’o), and five-company battalions (sa), five battalions constituted a regiment (yŏng) of approximately 2,475 men. The Sogo Armies performed disastrously during the Manchu Invasions due to the county magistrates' poor management and outright corruption, who packed them with the old, weak, and infirm soldiers. After the invasions, they were divided into "good" (yang, 良) and "base" (cheon, 賤) groups, leading to abuses such as double labor obligations. By the 18th century, the Sogo Army became increasingly nominal, reduced to tax-collection units by the late Joseon. During Heonjong's reign, he reduced them to a corvée labor force, and their garrison commanders operated in the realms of public safety and pacification as thief-catching and tiger killing.

=== Garrison Command System ===
After the Manchu invasion of Korea, Injo established the Garrison Command System (Yŏngjang chedo) to take over the training and military preparation of Joseon and separated the military administration from the civil interference of the provincial magistrates. The Garrison Command System replaced recruitment with universal conscription, which like the Sogo system, required all citizens of Joseon to enlist because most regions lacked enough population base to maintain more than three. However, civil officials resisted, resources were lacking, and the system eventually reverted to being overseen by civil magistrates. Under King Hyojong, efforts were made to restore the professional system, but by later times, the compromise system of civil magistrates doubling as Yeongjang became the standard. During Yeongjo's reign, the number of garrisons had grown to forty-nine, with nine in Pyeongan and six in Hamgyŏng Province. The other provinces had at least five, except for Kangwŏn, which could still only maintain there. Garrison commanders (yŏngjang) primary duty was to administer the provincial military structure and command garrisons. They also served a concurrent role of sheriffs (t'op'osa), shifting from military defense to catching criminals and suppressing local unrest. Magistrates were frequently appointed as garrison commanders, only nominally separating their duties. However, military men could be appointed separately to a garrison command in the southern regions without posting concurrent magistrate (paech'i). Nonetheless, the garrison commanders throughout the peninsula were increasingly responsible for civil policing activities at the expense of their military duties.

== Equipment ==
=== Uniforms ===
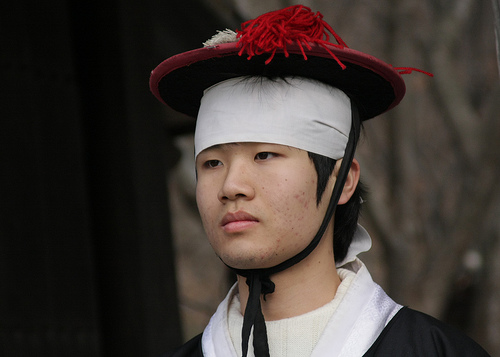
Jeonnip (전립), or called beonggeoji (벙거지), a Korean hat worn by military personnel during the Joseon period

Soldiers and military officials wear military uniforms (kunbok, 군복; (軍服)). The peasant soldiers wore black military robes (hyeopsu 협수; 夾袖) with white trimes and light blue long sleeveless vests (jeonbok, 전복; 戰服) representing the central army and provincial armies. White vests or various colors are worn by soldiers of the Military Training Agency. Red vests representing military police and yellow vests for military bands. Commissioned officers (usually military yangban) wore a red and yellow (or orange) military officials coat (dongdari, 동다리; 同多里) for middle to high-ranking officers and red and blue dongdari for junior-ranking officers with a black jeonbok and a military belt (jeondae, 전대; 戰帶). During emergencies and wartime, officers, Pengbaesu, and Gabsa wore war clothing (yungbok, 융복; 戎服) distinguishing rank by color. Red yungbok with a blue military belt represents high-ranking officers. Blue yungbok with a red military belt represents mid-ranking officers. Black yungbok with a black military belt represents junior ranking officers and elite soldiers and cavalry. High and middle-ranking officers wore hats called jeonrip. Soldiers of all ranks and low-ranking officers wore hats called beonggeoji.

=== Armor ===
In the early dynasty, the army wore chainmail (swaejagab, 쇄자갑; 鎖子甲) and plate and mail armor (gyeongbeongap, 경번갑; 鏡幡甲) from the late Goryeo dynasty. The Joseon military policy required peasant conscripts to provide their armor. Chain mail, paper armor (jigap, 지갑; 紙甲), scale armour, and padded armor made from cotton layers, iron plates, and (or) leather (eomshimgap, 엄심갑; 掩心甲) serving as a similar function to the Gambeson. They were popular among light infantry and peasant soldiers in the provincial armies as they offered body protection at lower prices. Sets of leather armor worn by peasant soldiers are called Pigabju (피갑주; 皮甲胄).

The central army's Pengbaesu wore chain mail or mail and plate armour. Still, they, along with the Gabsa wore a traditional form of Korean armor that persisted with the Mongols' influences during the 13~14th centuries, lamellar armor (jalgap, 찰갑; 札甲). It was a complete metallic armor set. It comprises a Jeongjipmo, a broad-brimmed helmet protecting against direct and angled impacts. It is similar in function and appearance to the European kettle hat with attached neck defenses of mail or lamellar. They have body armor reaching down to the thighs or knees and shoulder guards protecting the upper arm.

In the 16th century, the dujeonggap (두정갑; 頭釘甲) is the Korean equivalent of brigandine, which evolved from the Mongol elements of Goryeo armor. The Pengbaesu, Gabsa, and peasant conscripts wore brigandine made from cotton layers, and the plates woven into the brigandine were either iron, copper, or leather. It became the primary form of Korean armor and often reached below the knees when worn. The helmet assumes a conical shape and has three brigandine flaps protecting the head's sides and back. The high-ranking officers wore brass scales (두석린갑; 豆錫鱗甲) and middle-low-ranking officers wore iron. The elite soldiers and the cavalry wore iron or copper in the main army, while peasant soldiers wore leather in the provincial army.

In the 19th century, the Joseon Army's armor usage declined as heavy cavalry and generals relied on armor while foot soldiers and light cavalry wore only uniforms. In 1867, an attempt was made to develop anti-ballistic armor called Myeonje baegab, made from 13 to 30 sewed sheets of textiles and cotton combined into a thick vest to the overwhelming firepower of rifles fielded by Western powers such as France and the United States. Although this attempt was partially in line with the current method of producing anti-ballistic vests, it does not prove effective. In the late 1870s, Korean armor fell into disuse completely.

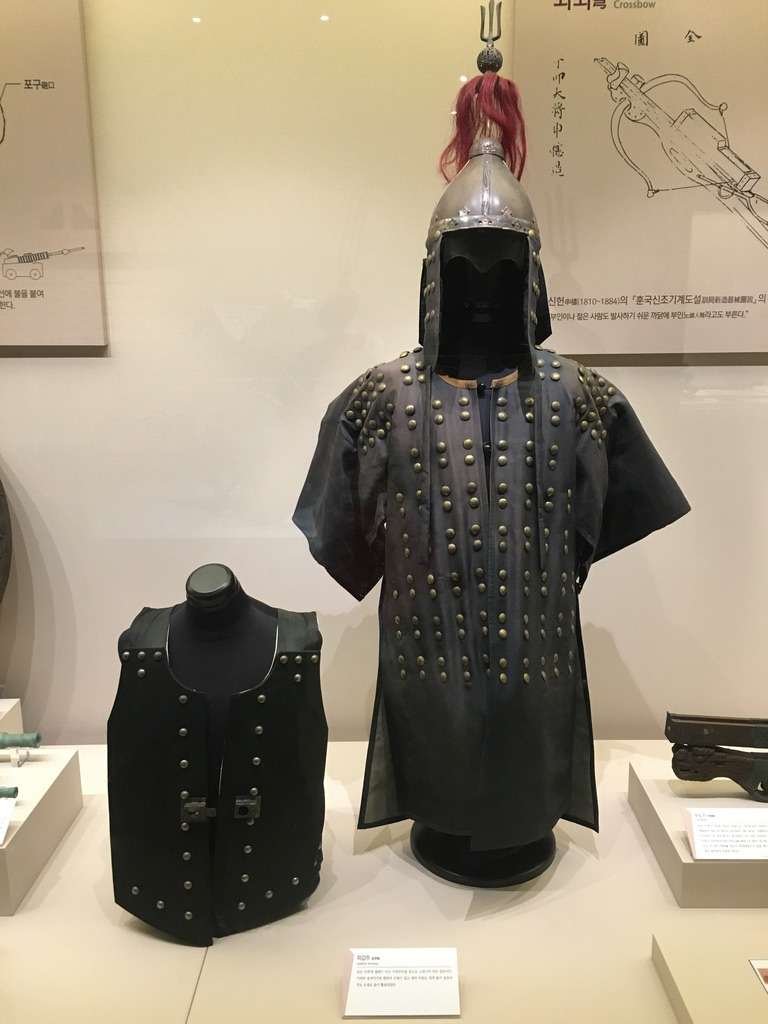
Sets of leather armor, Pigabju, worn by the peasant soldiers.

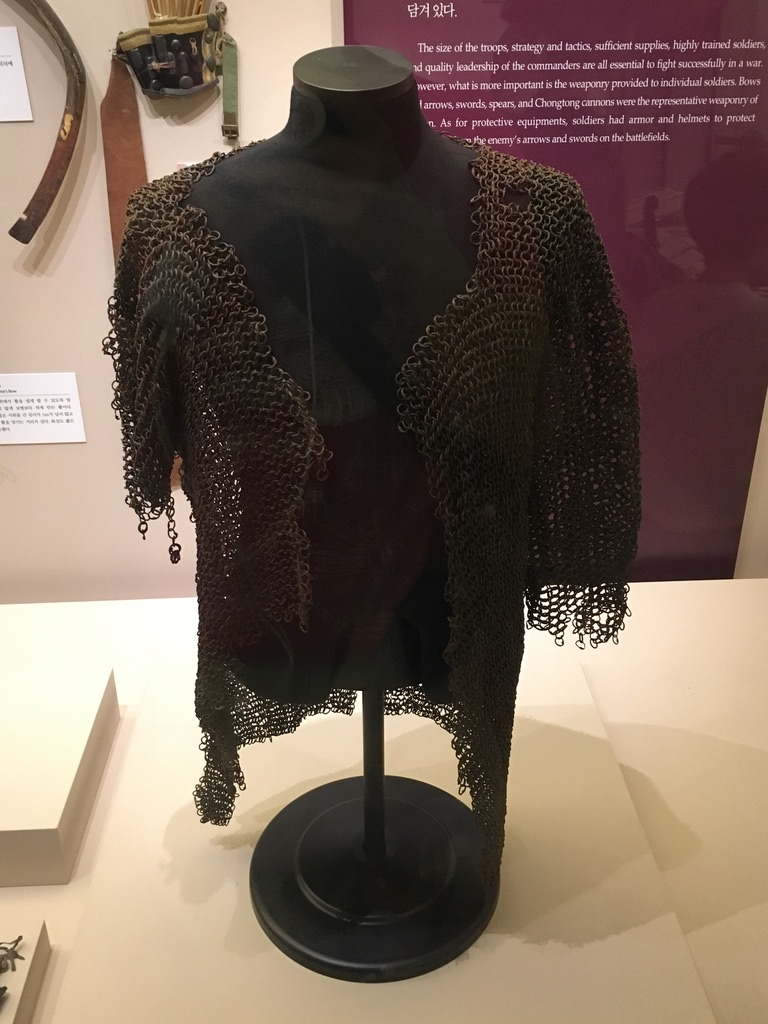
Swaejagab, chain mail from the Joseon Dynasty worn by peasant conscripts

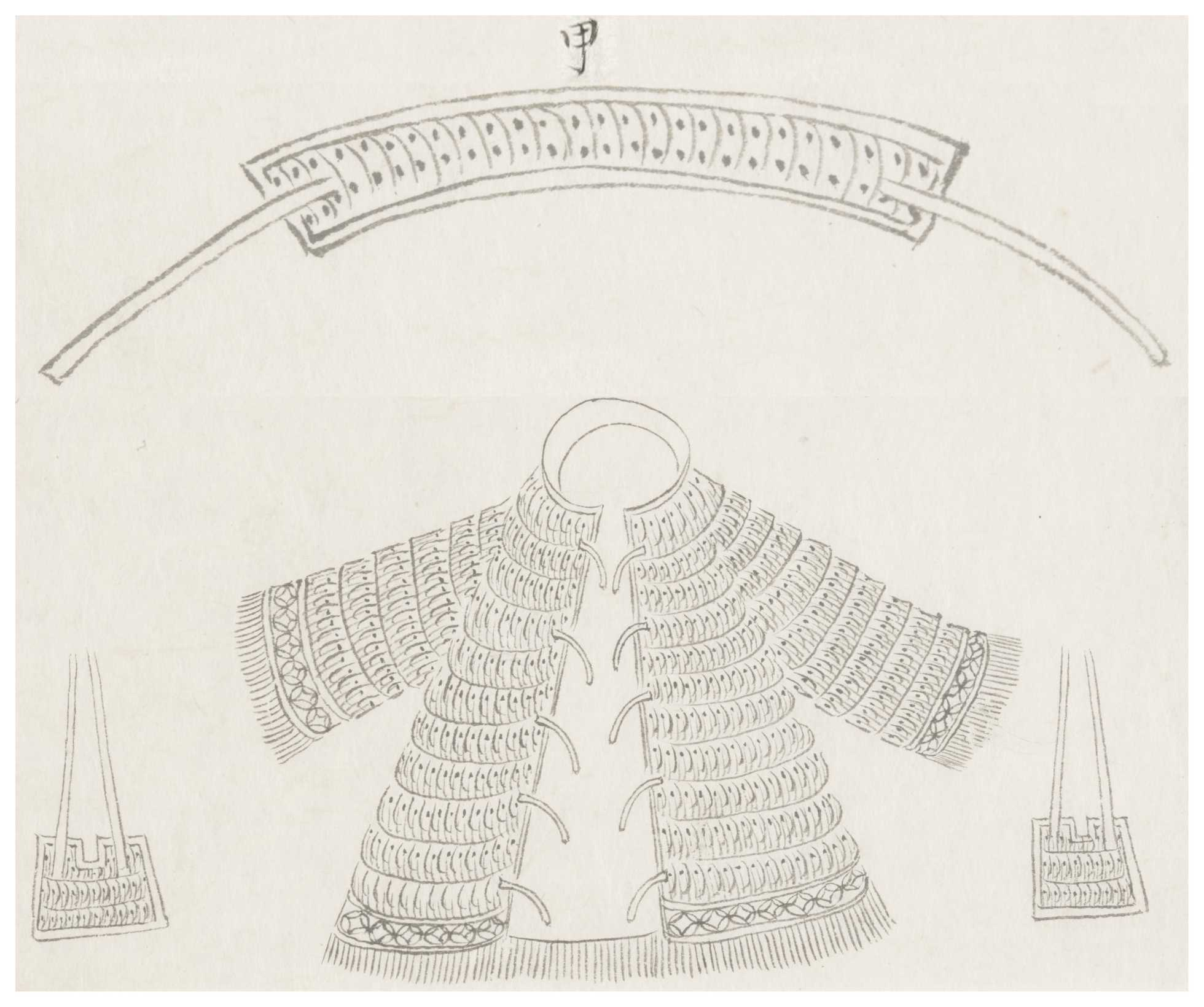
Jalgap, the lamellar armor of Joseon worn by the Pengbaesu, and the Gabsa

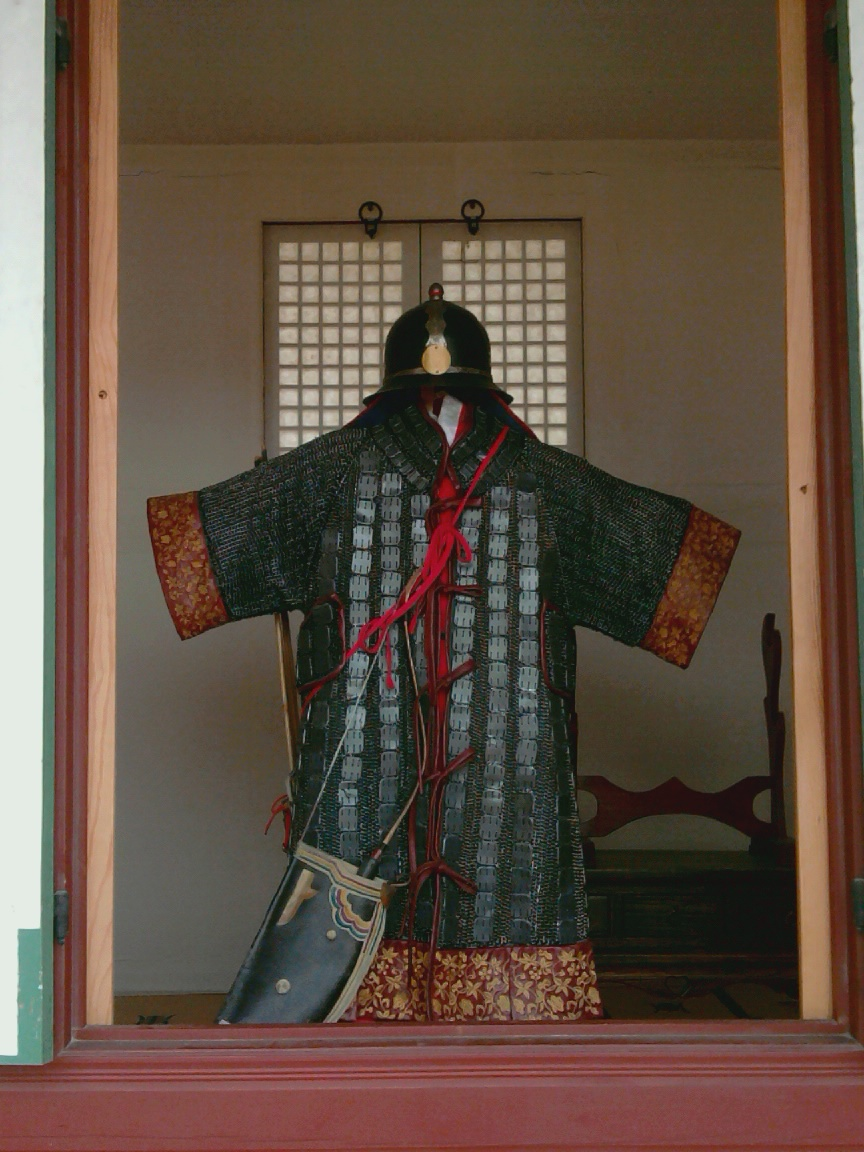
Korean mail and plate armor worn by the Pengbaesu

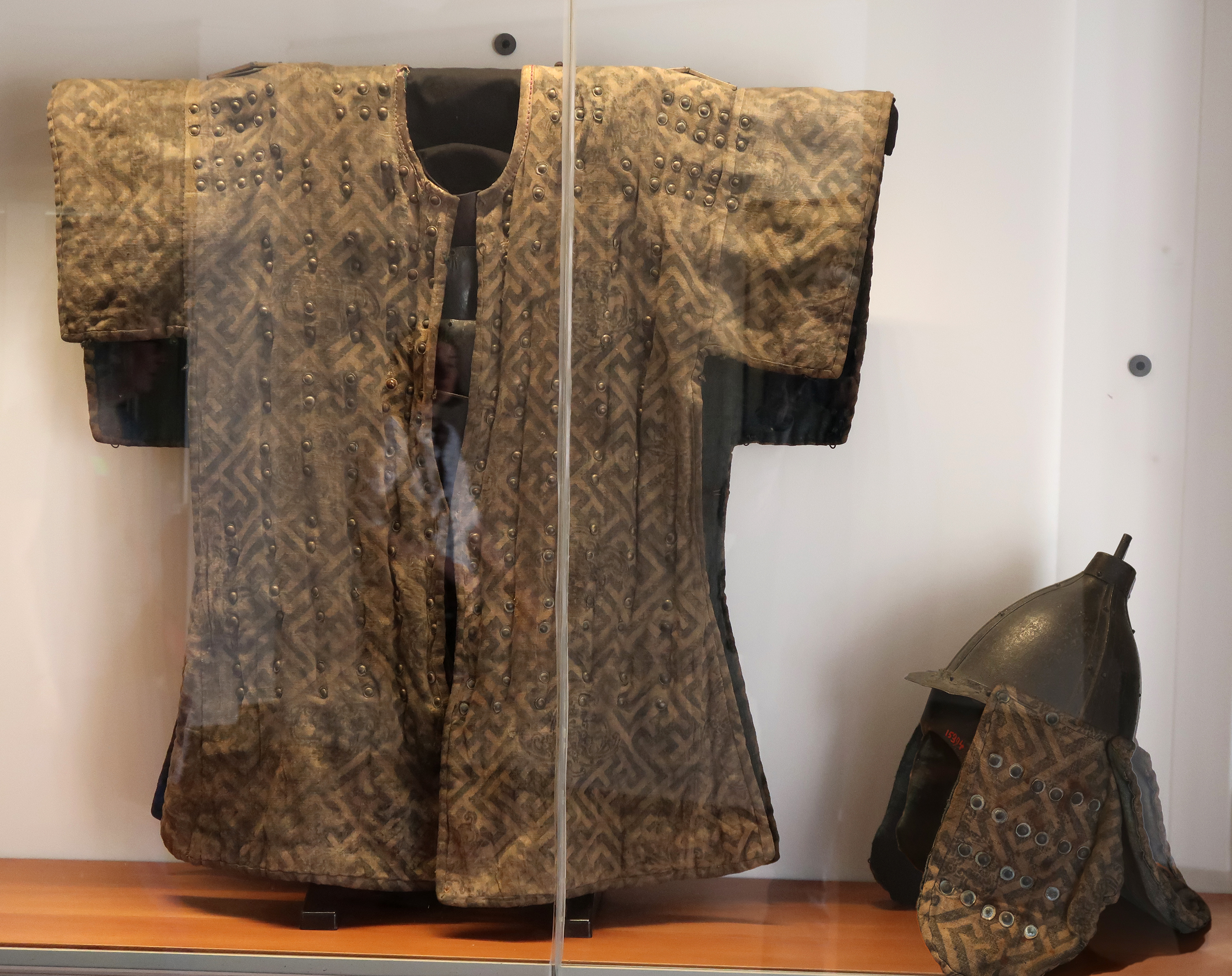
armor and helmet. Joseon period, 19th century. Musée Guimet.

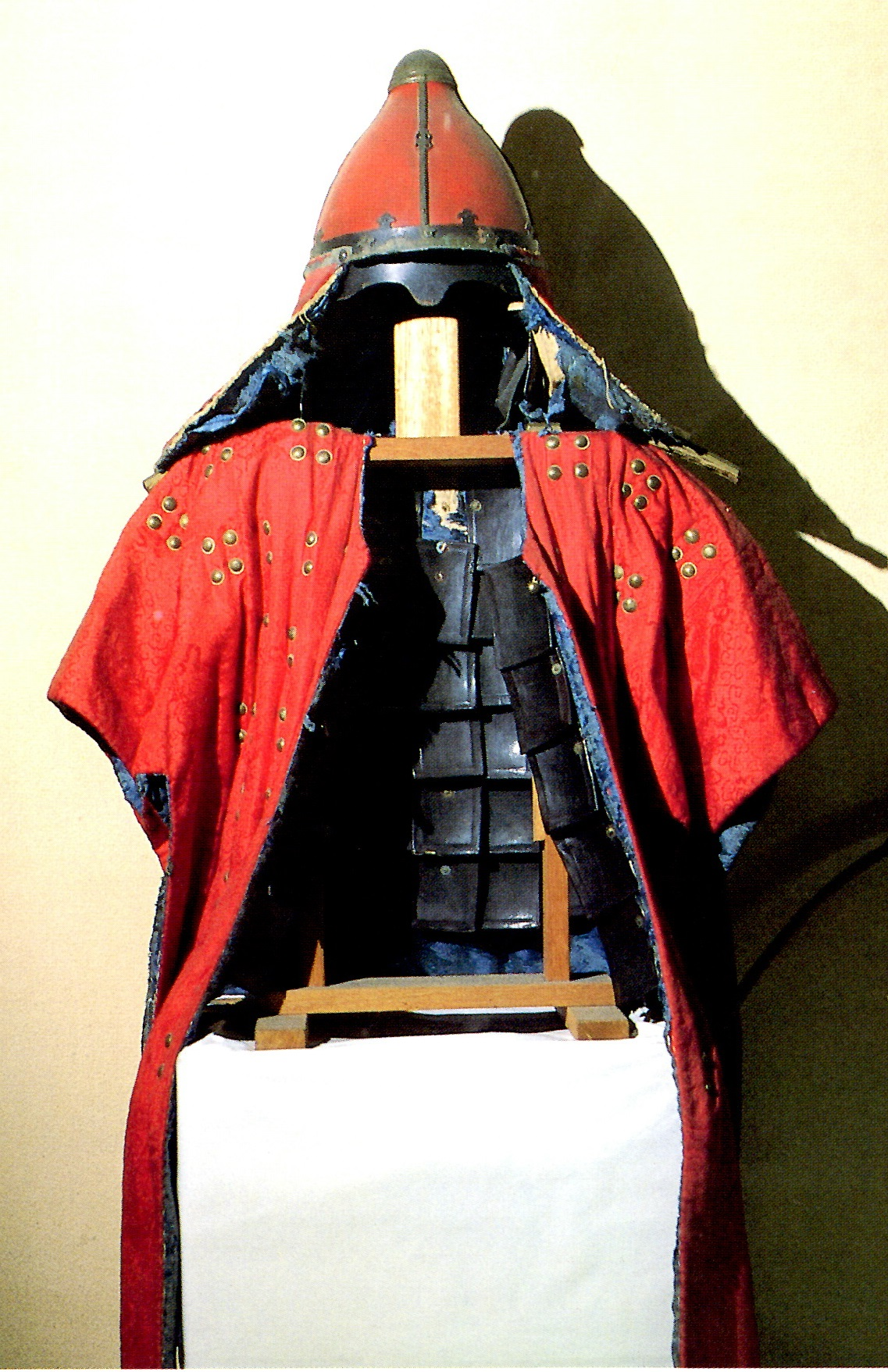
Joseon dynasty Dujeong-gap

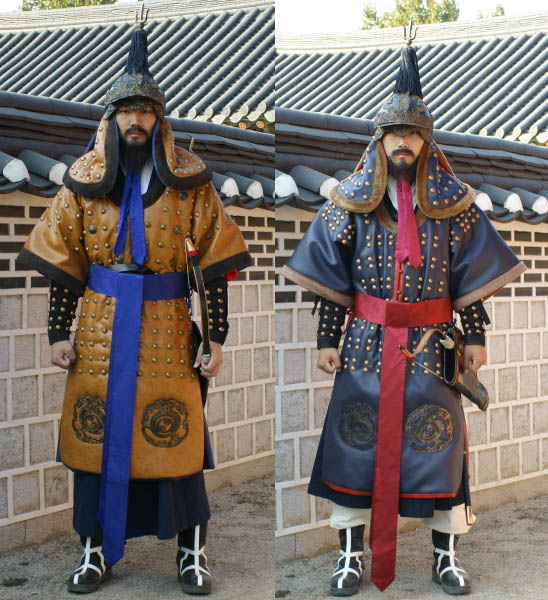
Modern reenactors wearing a complete Dujeong-gap set. While conventionally shown as red, the fabric could be of various colors.

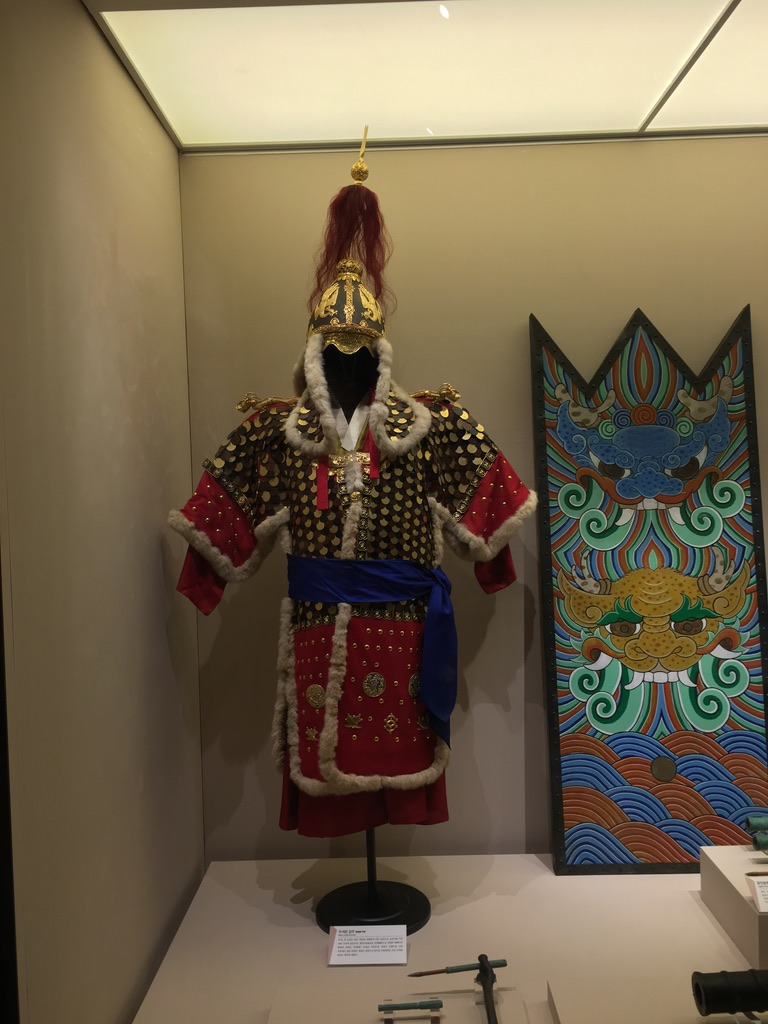
Brass scale armor worn by military officers

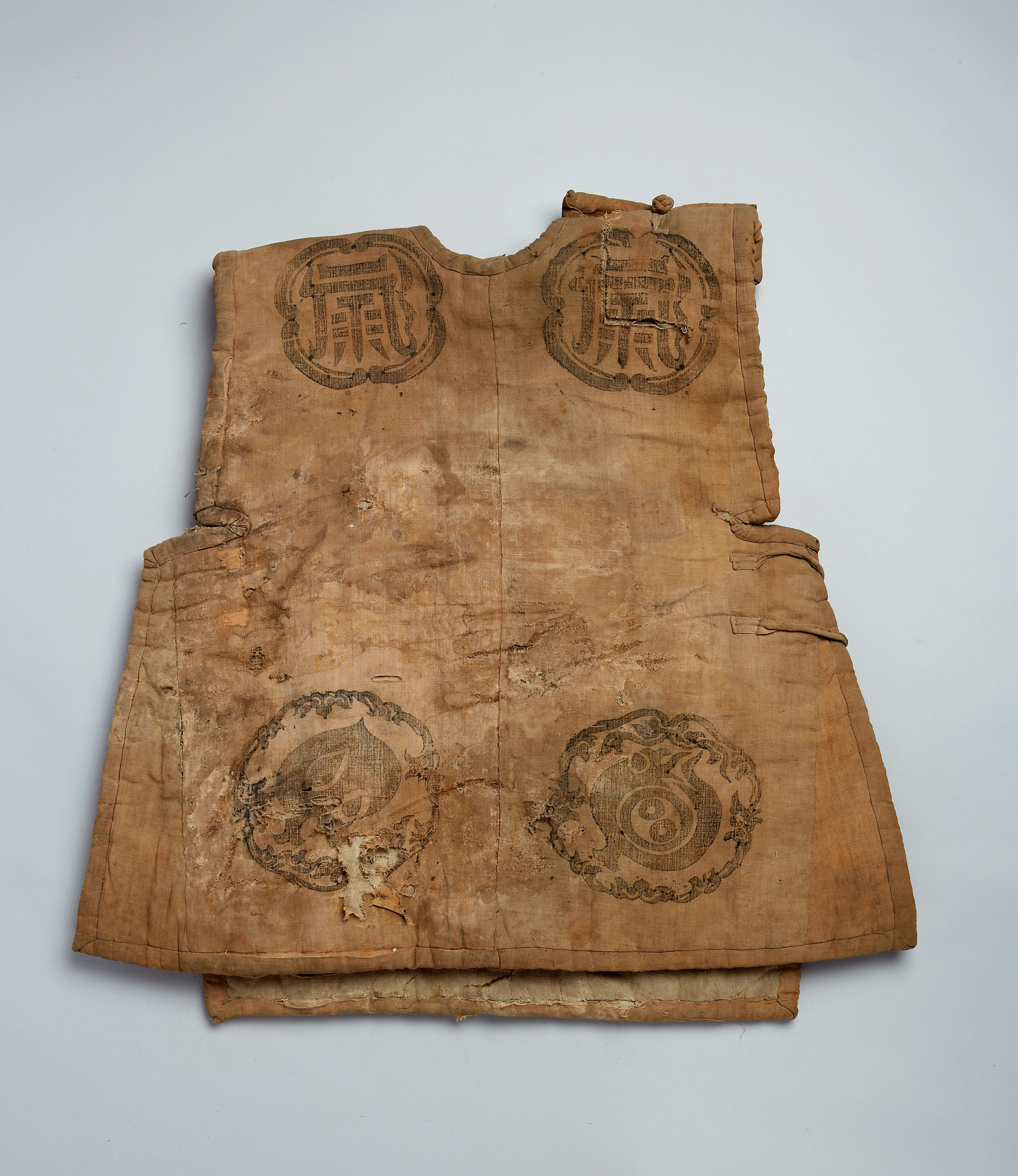
Front of the Myeonje baegab

=== Melee weapons ===
The standard Korean sword was the hwando, a short and light-curved sword commonly used by Joseon soldiers during peacetime. The standard polearm used in the army was the jangchang (장창; 長槍), a four-meter spear wielded by infantry, and cavalry, for thrusting and drawing while moving forward and backward. However, due to its length, they cannot throw this spear. The woldo was a curved-bladed polearm with a spike at the end of the handle and a tassel or feather attached to the blade. The woldo was used mainly by cavalry for its heavy striking power while on horseback. The infantry, but mostly cavalry, used the pyeongon, a 1.5 metres (4 ft 11 in)-long flail made from hardwood stick, painted red, acting as the handle for a chain attached to a shaft with iron nails. The auxiliary Korean spear was the dangpa, a 7–8 ft three-pronged trident with a spear tip in the middle used for close defensive combat to trap an enemy's sword between two of the three prongs. The Pengbaesu carry a pengbae (팽배; 彭排), a round shield, or a deungpaea (등패; 藤牌), a rattan shield along with a sword.

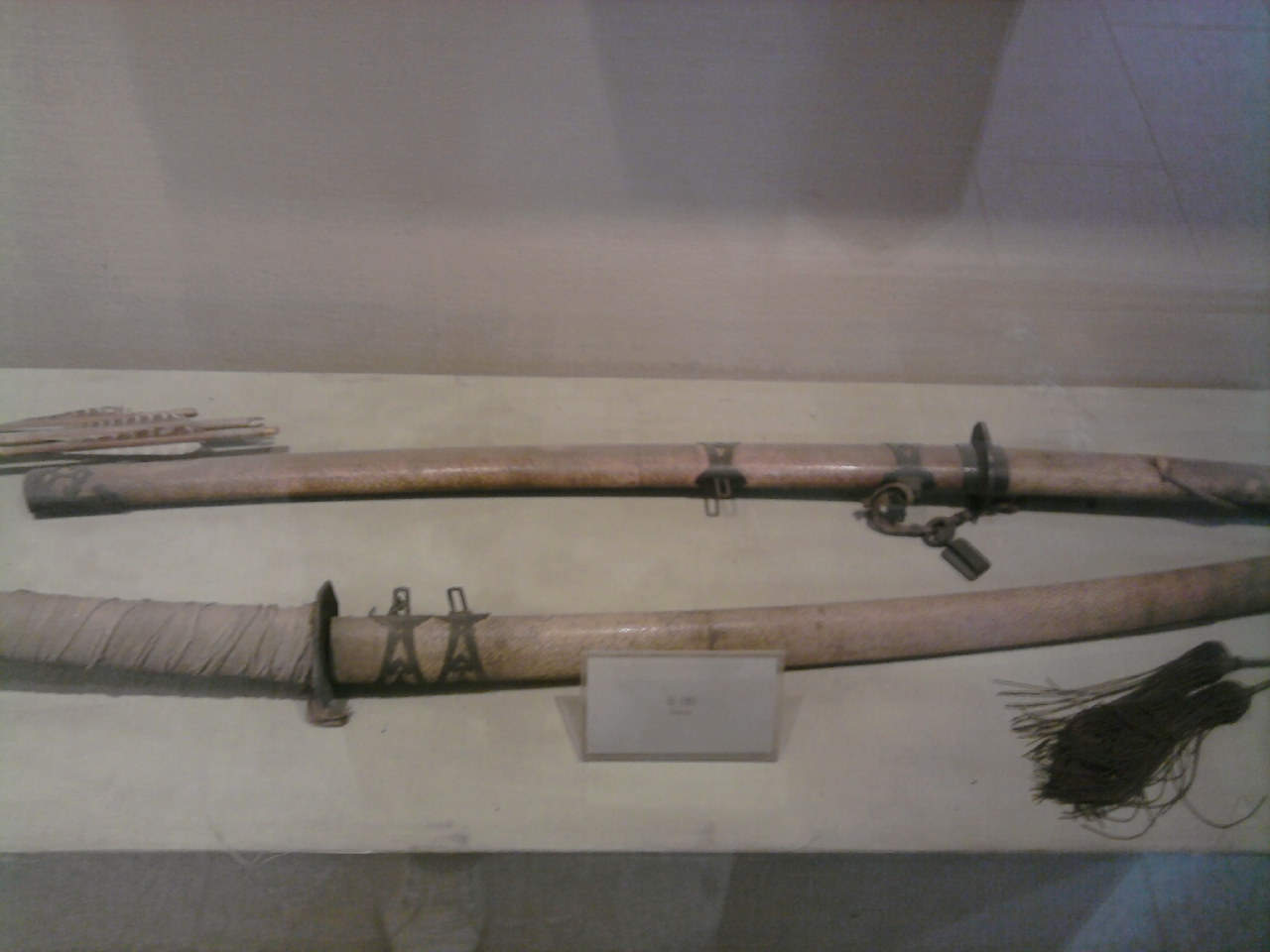
Hwando, standard sword of Joseon military

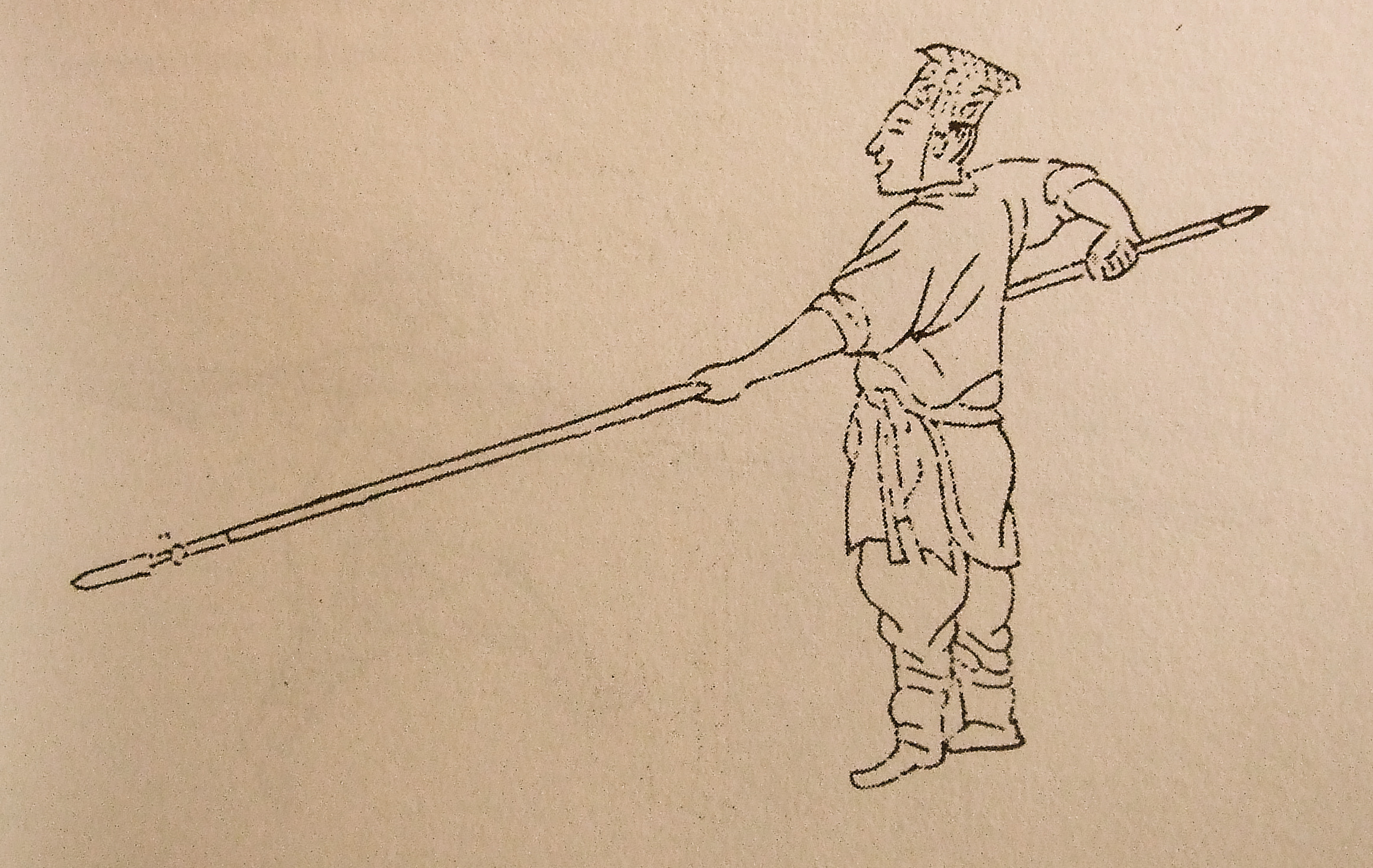
Jangchang, the standard long spear of the Joseon Military wielded by both infantry and cavalry

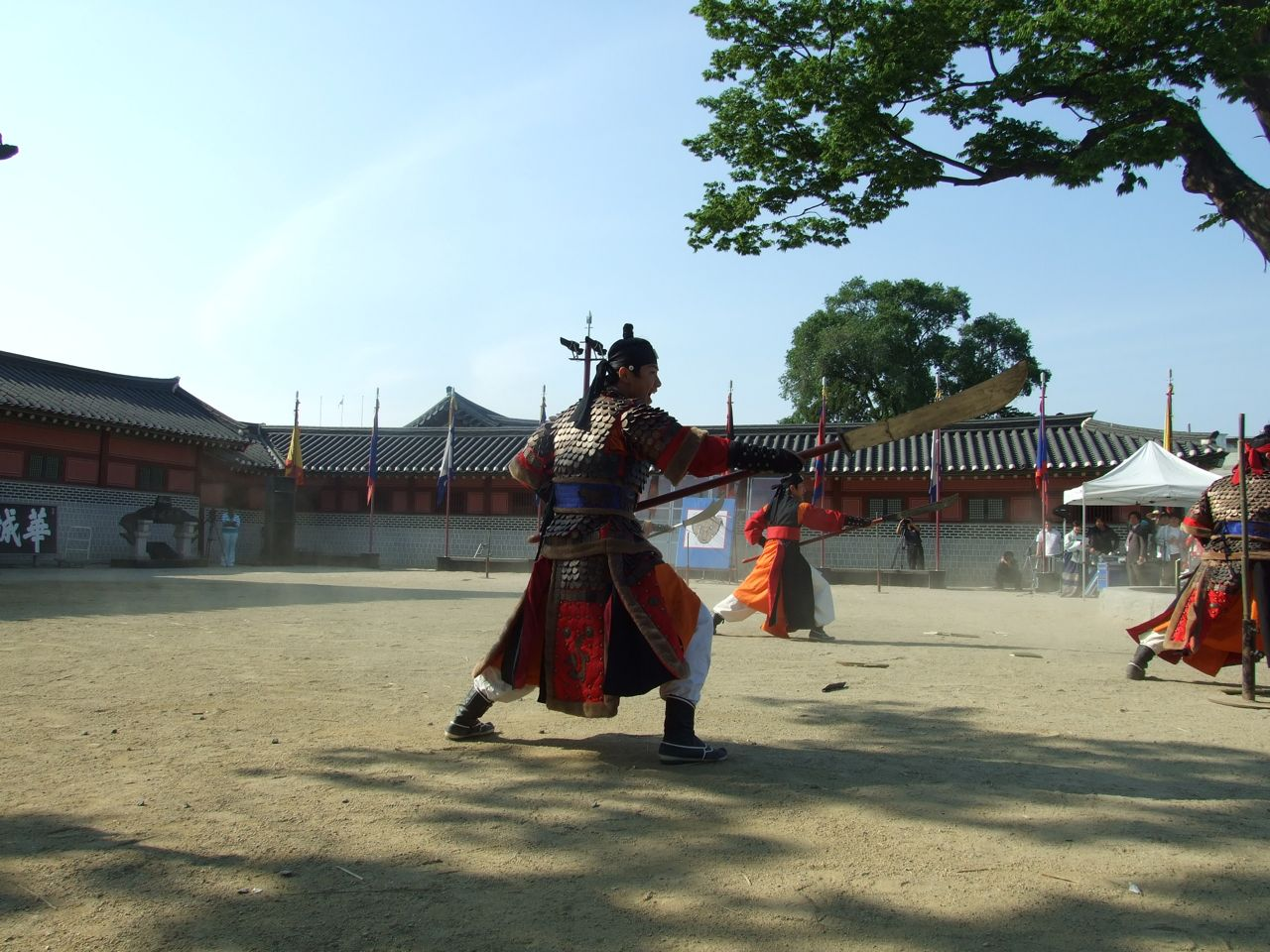
Woldo, a polearm wielded by mostly the cavalry

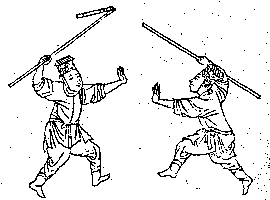
Pyeongon, a two-section staff flail wielded by mostly the cavalry

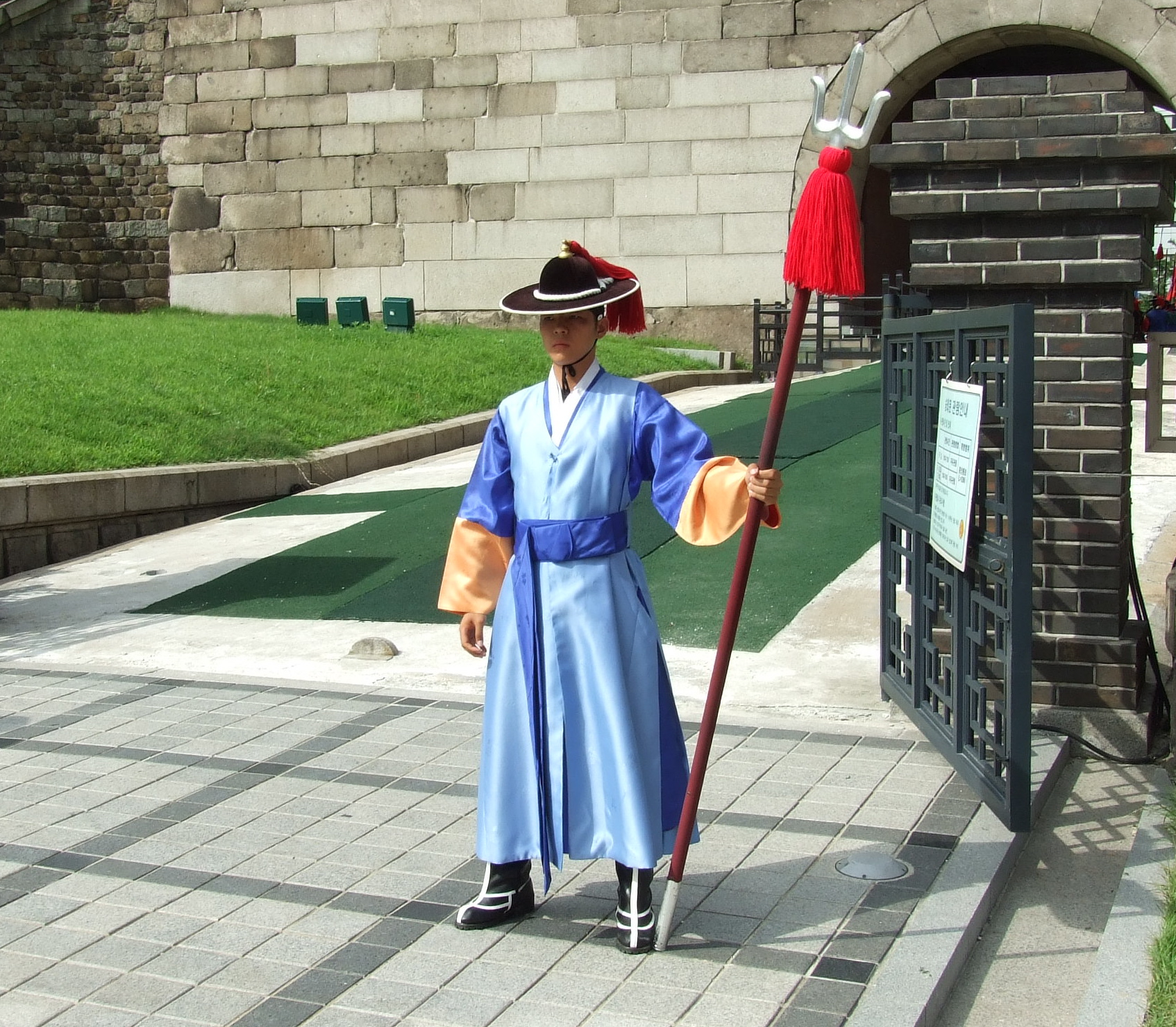
Dangpa, auxiliary polearm of the Joseon Military

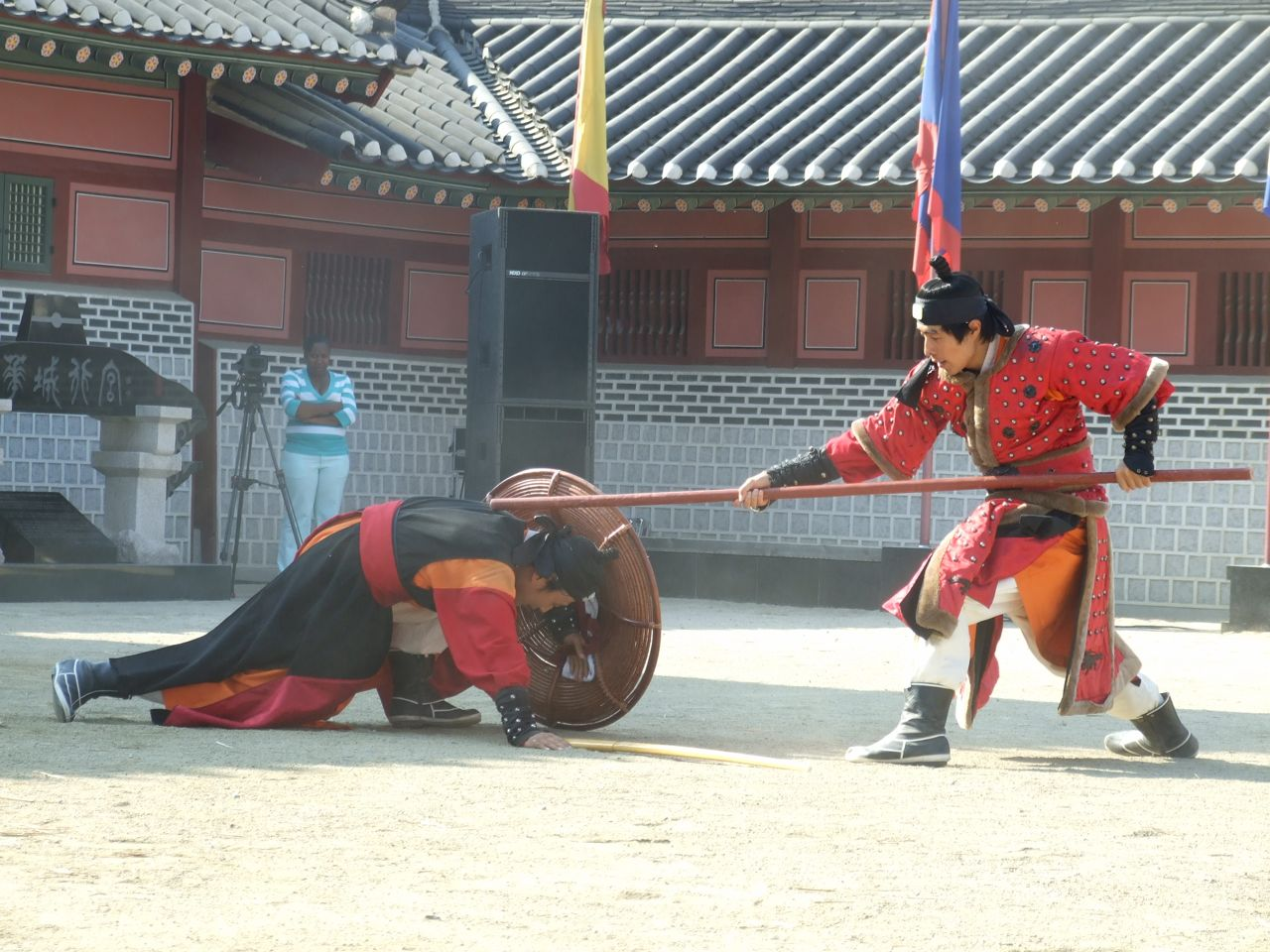
Deungpae, a rattan shield

=== Archery ===
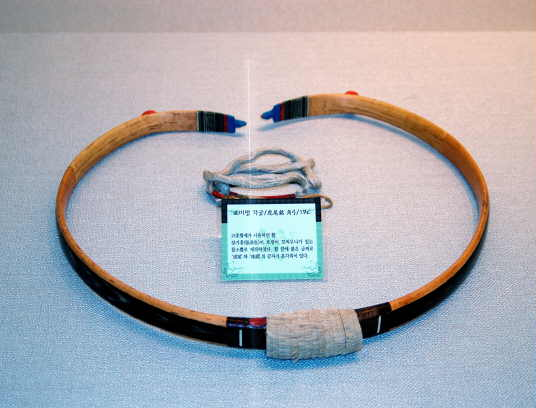
Gakgung, the standard bow for the Joseon Army

==== Bows and arrows ====
Joseon foot soldiers and cavalry often fought as archers with their bows which had a range of 450 metres (1,480 ft). Archers also used the pyeonjeon, a short arrow, and the tongah to help guide it as part of the standard kit of Chosun era archers. They can fire at an extended range of 350 meters and flatter trajectories with a faster velocity and penetrating power than regular arrows. Their quivers held 20 arrows and 10 pyeonjeon arrows.

==== Crossbows ====
Various types of crossbows were used such as the repeating crossbows. Various types of crossbows were used, and there is a record that crossbows were used along with bigyeokjincheonroe in the Battle of Haengju, one of the three battles of the Japanese invasions of Korea. In addition, in Hwaseong, Suwon, Gyeonggi-do, which was built as a new city by King Jeongjo in the late Joseon Dynasty, separate gatehouses (Seojangdae and Seonodae) that could fire crossbows were built, showing that it was an important weapon used in battle.

=== Gunpowder ===
In 1395, several weapons were in use: a series of cannons called the daejanggunpo, ijanggunpo, and samjanggunpo, a shell-firing mortar called the jillyeopo, a series of yuhwa, juhwa, and chokcheonhwa rockets, which were the forerunners of the singijeon, and a signal gun called the shinpo. These cannons improved during Taejong's rule. Among the people responsible for the developments was Ch'oe Haesan, son of Ch'oe Musŏn. Yi Si-ae's Rebellion was the first time in Joseon history the Joseon Army utilized many different kinds of (gunpowder) weapons. Weapons, including the shield walls for defending against chongtong and chongtong to destroy the shield walls and hwacha for significant damage in massive fire combats during battles of Yi Si-ae's Rebellion. During the Imjin War, they mainly used the cannon in siege action and defending castles. The Nanjung ilgi says that many captured and used by the Japanese realized their full potential. There were few instances of Koreans employing artillery in the field, with largely ineffective results. Some irregular Korean units with government-supplied weapons fired explosive shells from mortars, but this occurred only in isolated instances.

==== Hwacha ====
The Koreans use the hwacha – multiple rocket-propelled arrows. The hwacha consisted of a two-wheeled cart carrying a board filled with holes into which the soldiers inserted singijeons. It could fire up to 200 singijeon, a type of rocket arrow, all at once. The hwacha also has a variant called the munjong hwacha. It can simultaneously fire 100 rocket arrows or 200 small chongtong bullets with changeable modules. Another variant was the mangam hwacha, a boxed cart with large faces of a dokkaebi painted on all three sides of the cart. Armed with forty seungja-chongtongs with fourteen in the front and thirteen on the left and right sides, only two soldiers can manage it, one firing the rows and the other reloads. They can fire 600 bullets, with each barrel holding 15 shots. The hwacha mainly was deployed during the Siege of Pyongyang in January 1593 and the Battle of Haengju in March 1593.

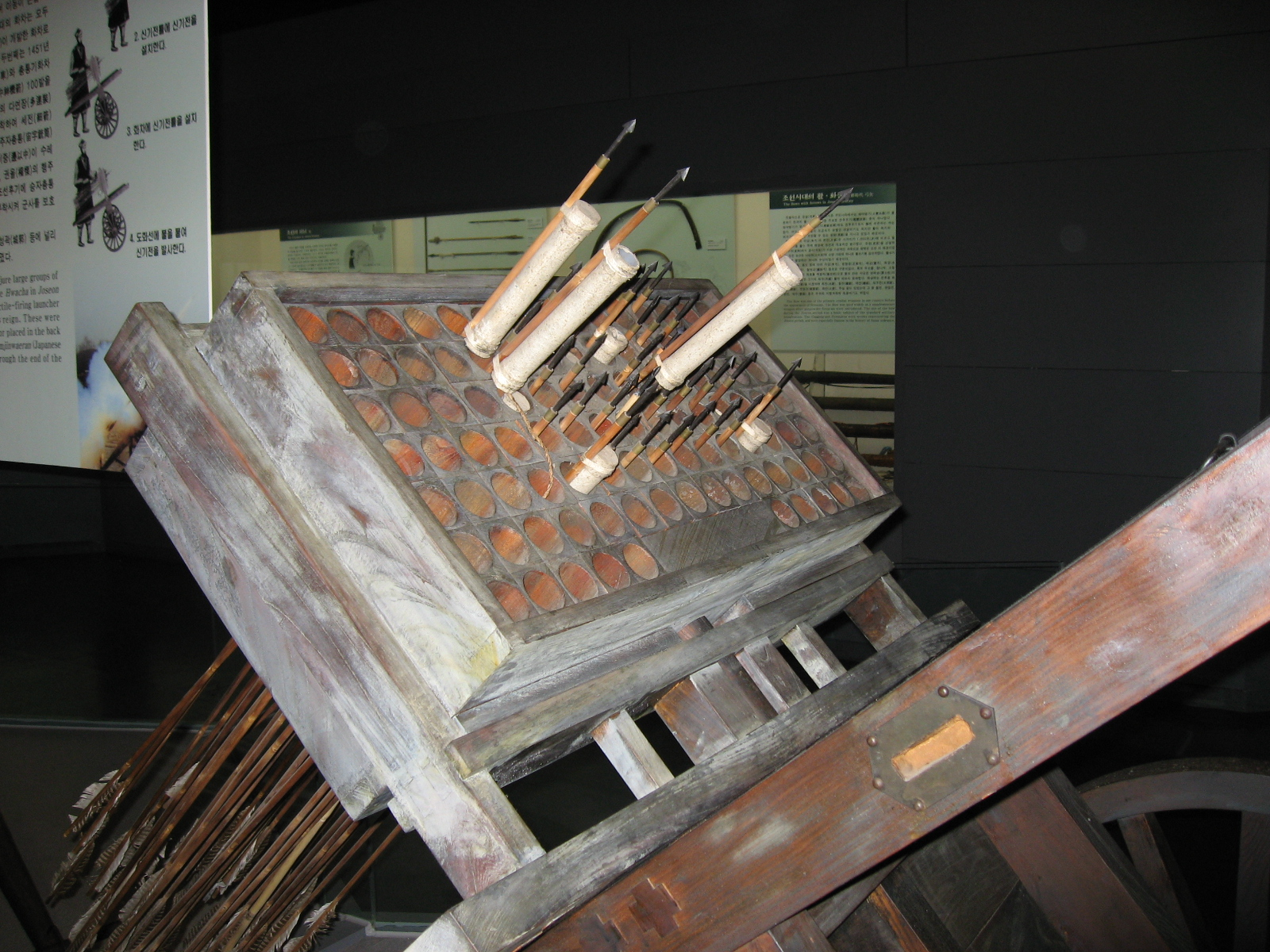
Hwacha launch pad, ignitors placed in the narrow section of each arrow to fire.

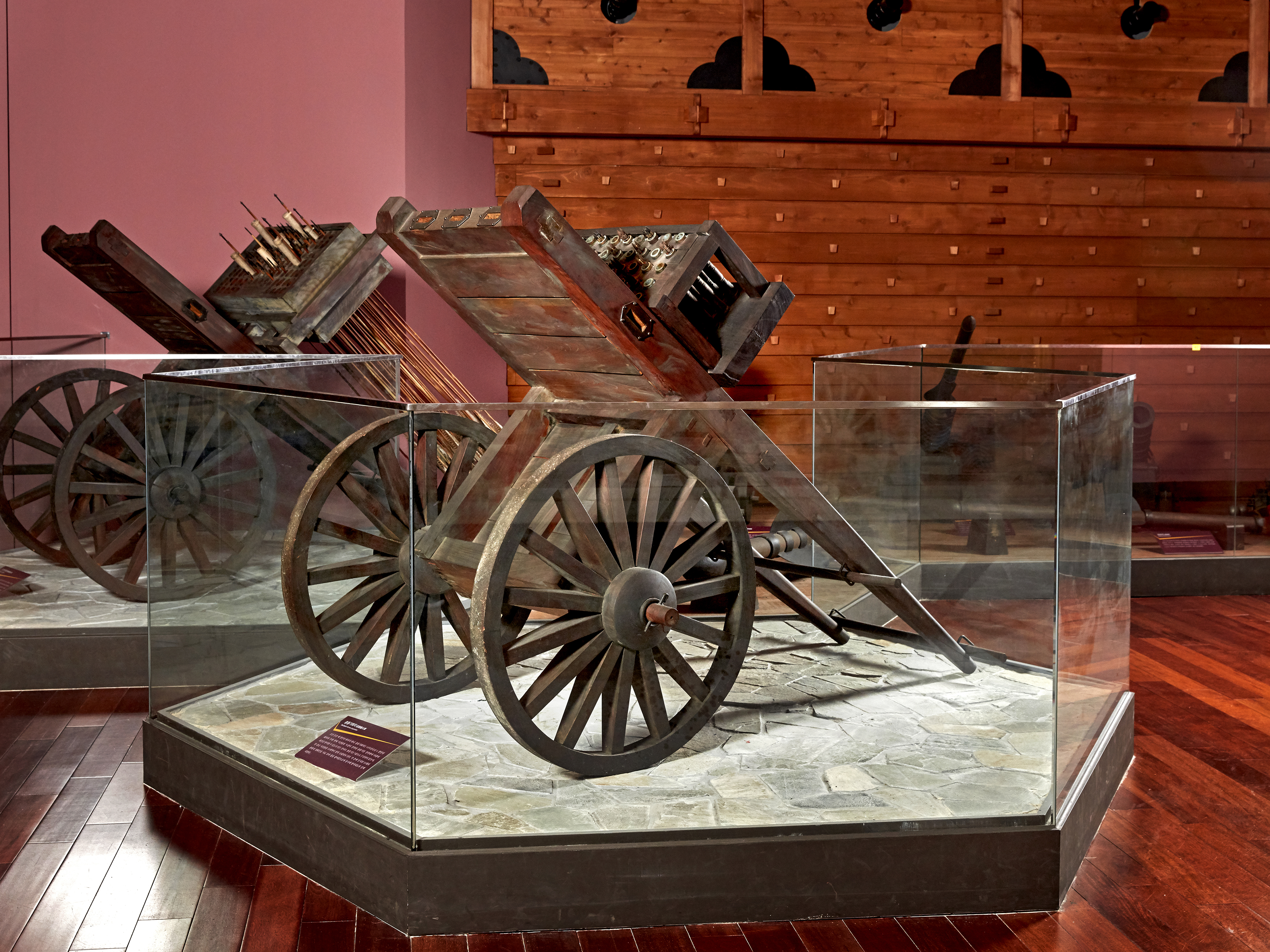
Chongtong-gi(총통기) Hwacha. Each of the 50 guns was loaded with four bullets, firing a total of 200 bullets. (Seoul War Memorial)

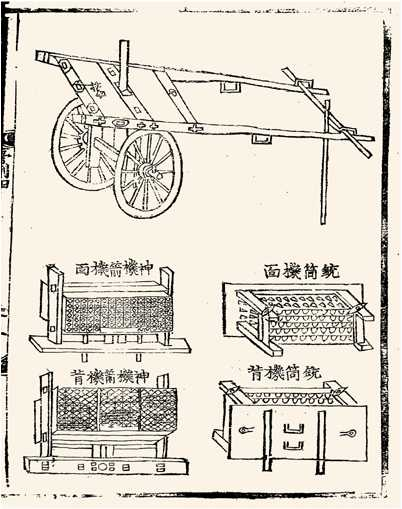
Plans for Hwacha assembly and disassembly (Gukjo-orye-seorye, 1474).

==== Cannons ====
The cheon "heaven" or "sky," Ji "earth," Hyeon "black," and Hwang "yellow" or "gold" names are not significant, being the first four characters of the Thousand Character Classic. His son, Sejong, also made many improvements and increased the ranges of these cannons (called hwapo and later hwatong "fire tube" and chongtong "gun tube"). In the early 1500s, the bullanggi (불랑기/佛狼機), a breech-loading swivel gun, was introduced to Korea from Portugal via China. It was divided into sizes 1 through 5, in decreasing size. The small but powerful cannons of this era saw extensive use during the Japanese invasions of Korea (1592–98) by both the Joseon Army and the navy. Mortars used at this time were the chongtong-wan'gue, byeoldae-wan'gu, dae-wan'gu, jung-wan'gu, and so-wan'gu. These fired stones, or the bigeukjincheonre, are timed explosive shells. The Hong'ipo (Korean: 홍이포; Hanja: 紅夷砲) was a cannon introduced from the Netherlands by Hendrick Hamel and others in the 1650s. Joseon also used this cannon during the 1866 French campaign against Korea, the 1871 United States expedition to Korea, and the Ganghwa Island incident of 20 September 1875.

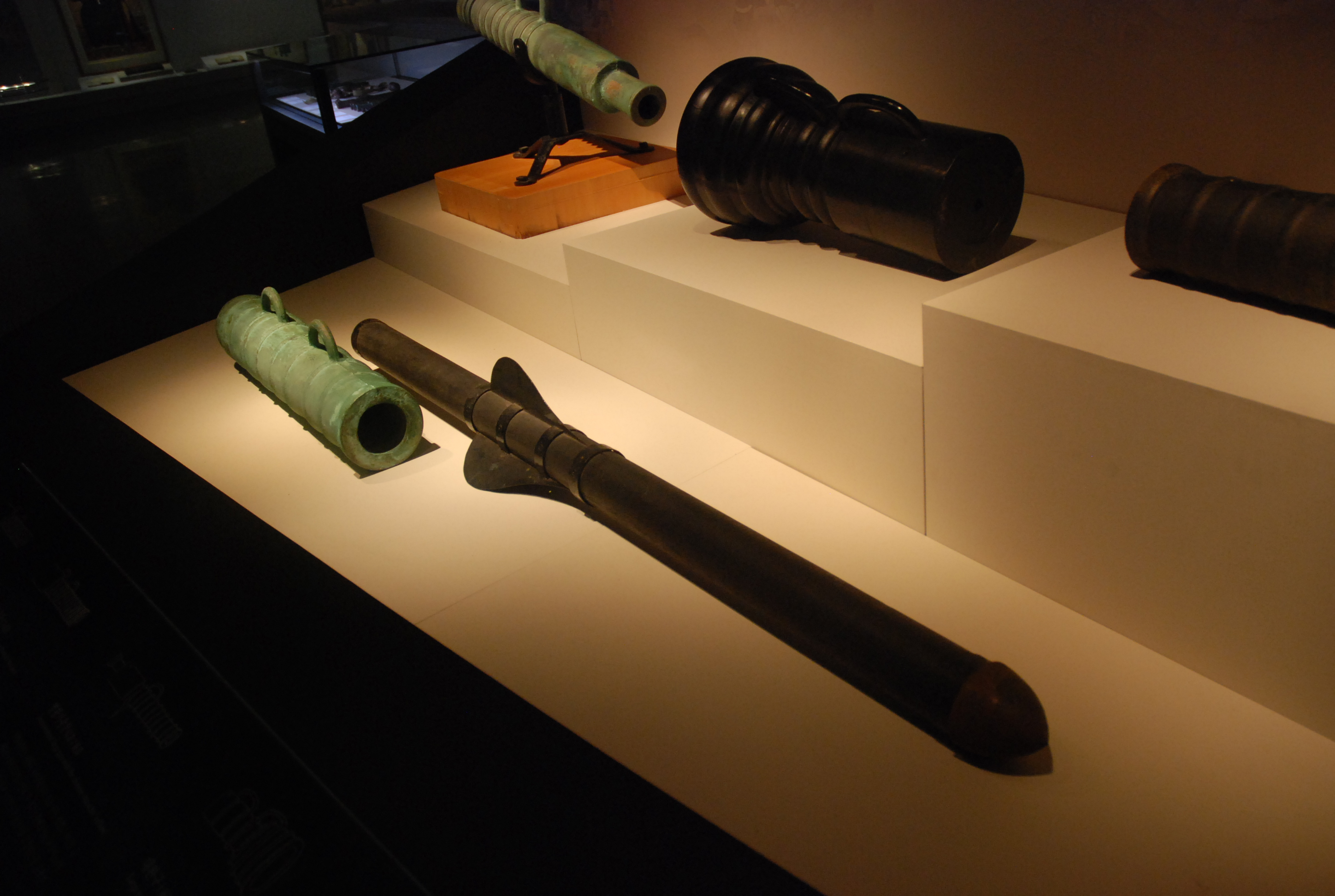
This Cheonja-chongtong is the largest size.

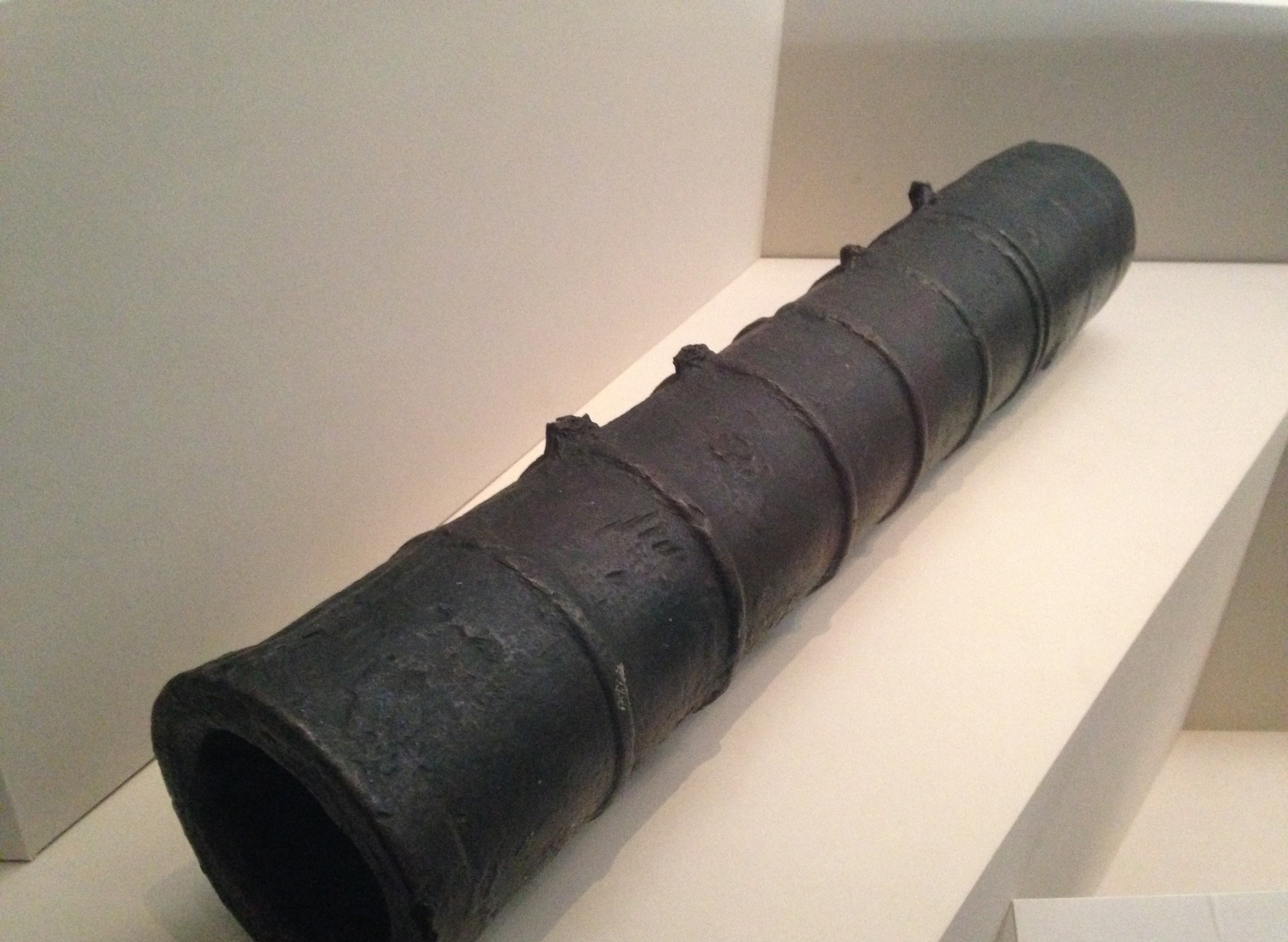
Jijachongtong, the second largest cannon in Mid Joseon Dynasty.

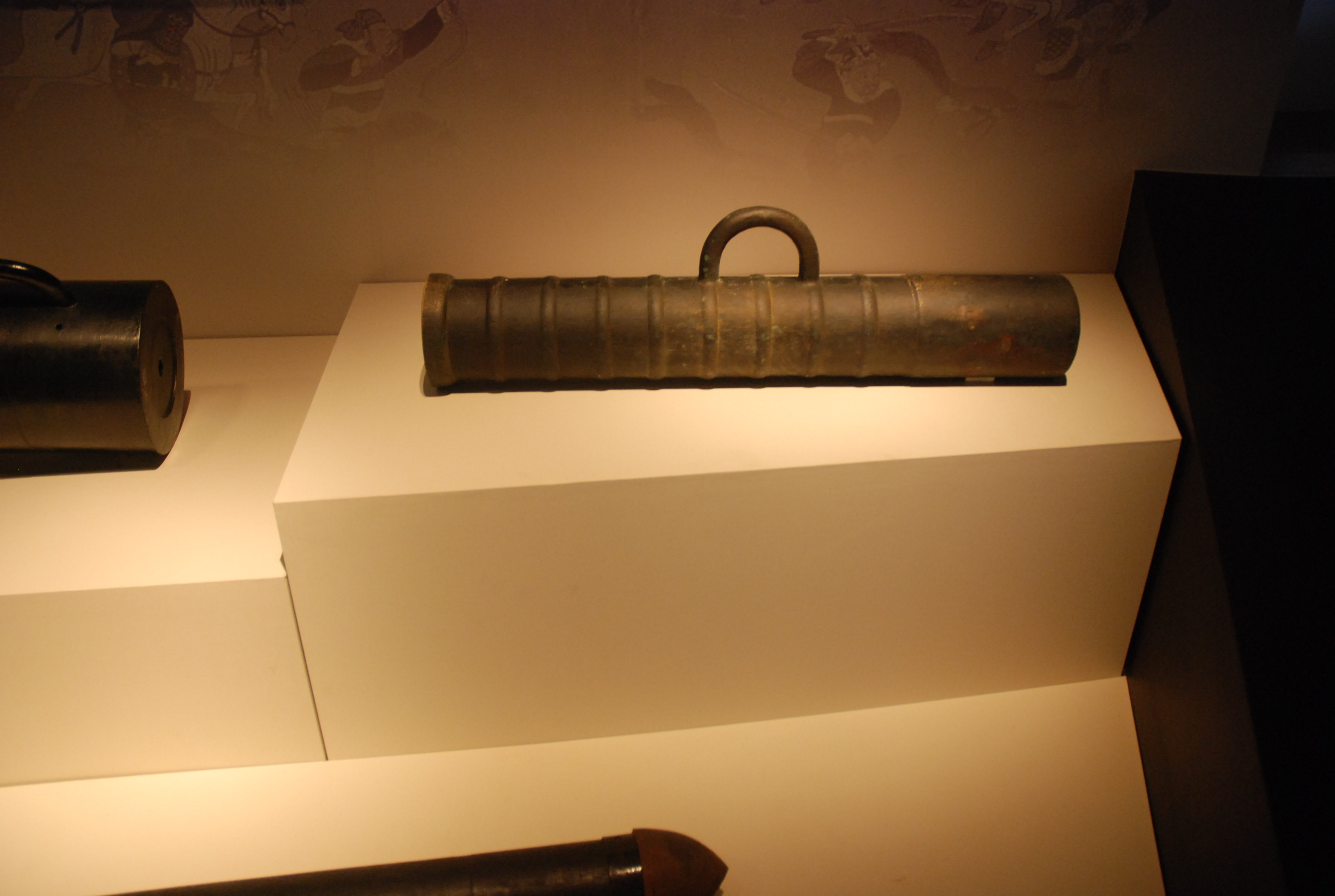
This Hyeonja-chongtong is a middle-sized cannon.

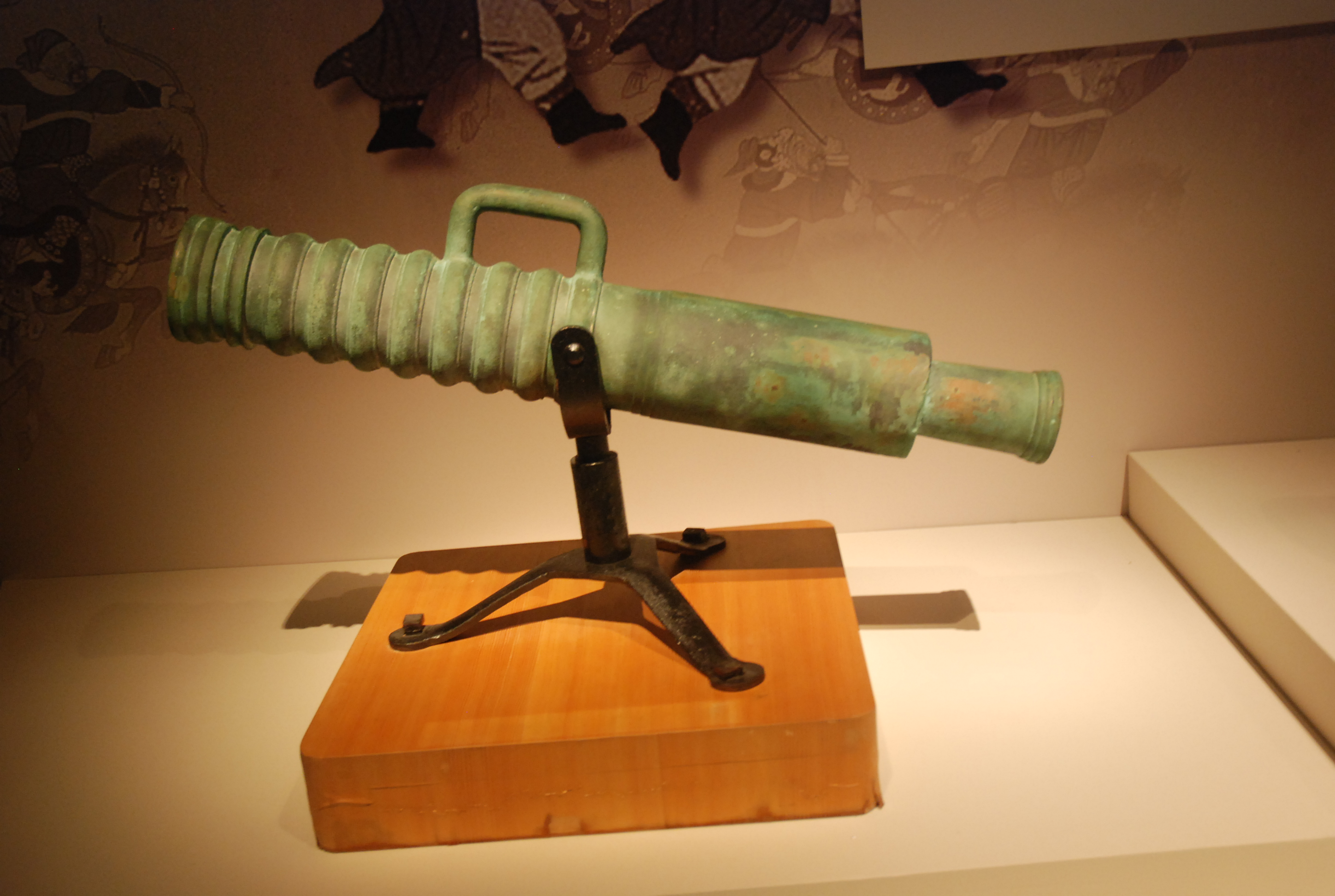
Byeolhwangja-chongtong, which was one of the miniature cannons

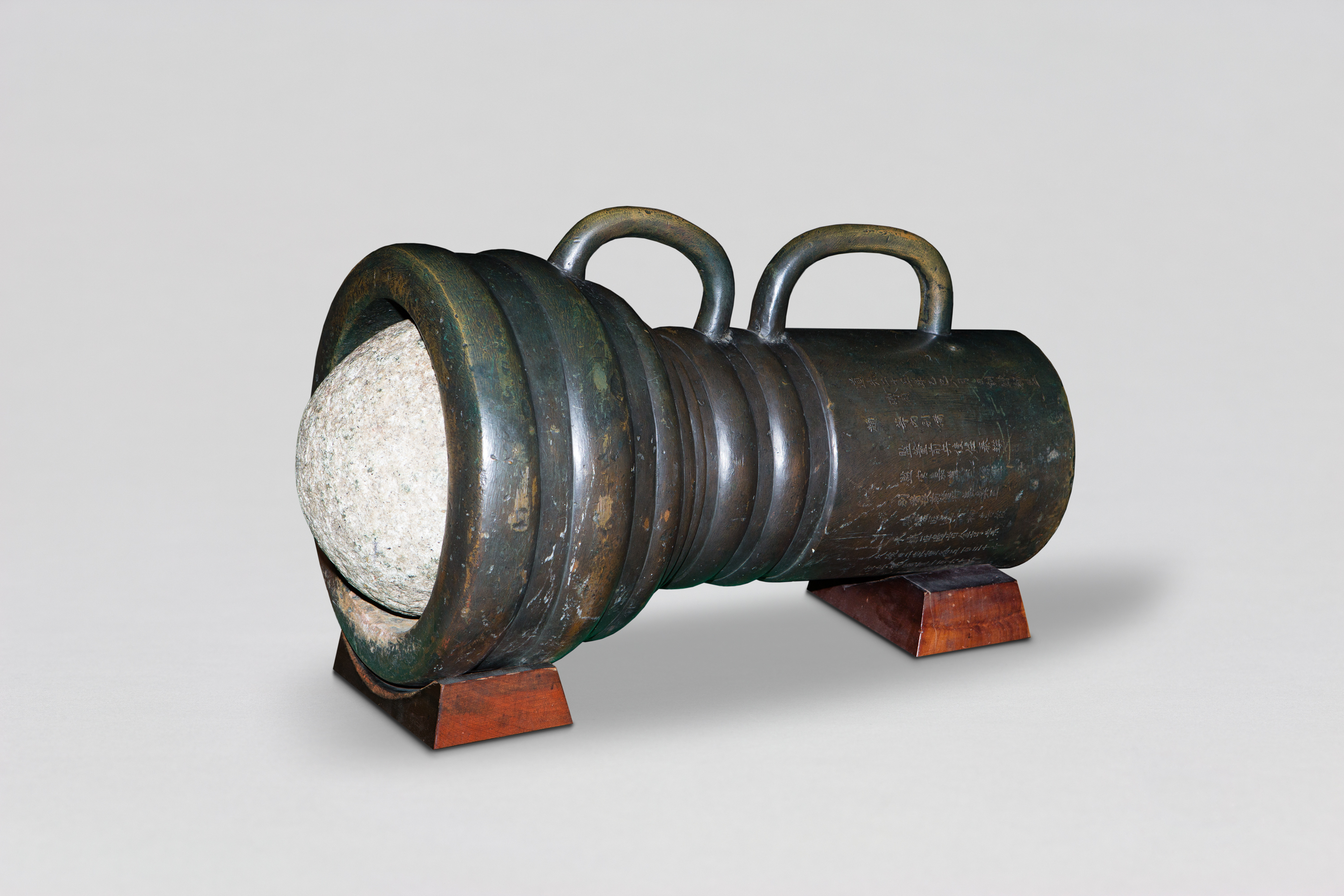
Large mortar with a round stone

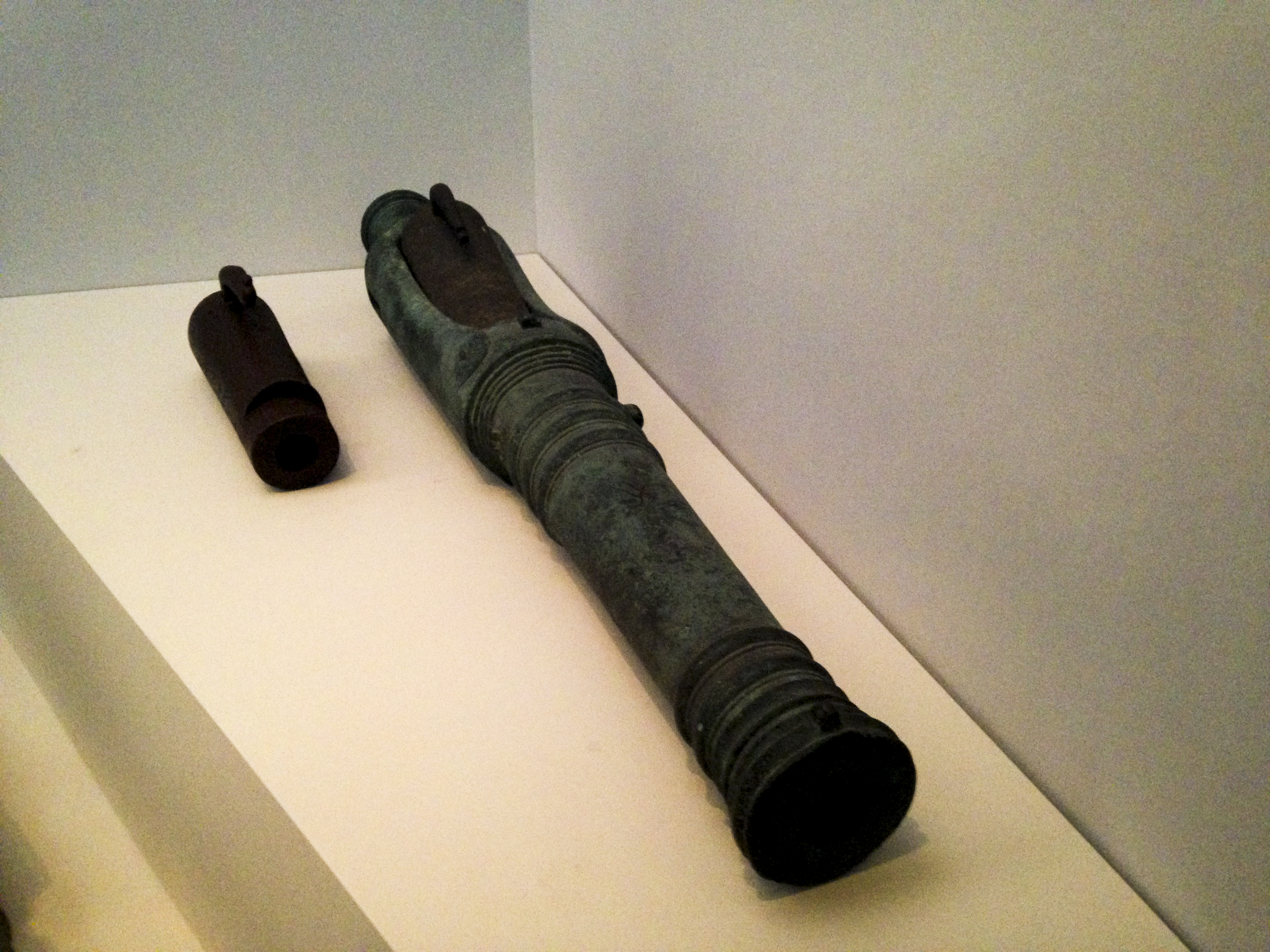
Breech-loading swivel gun

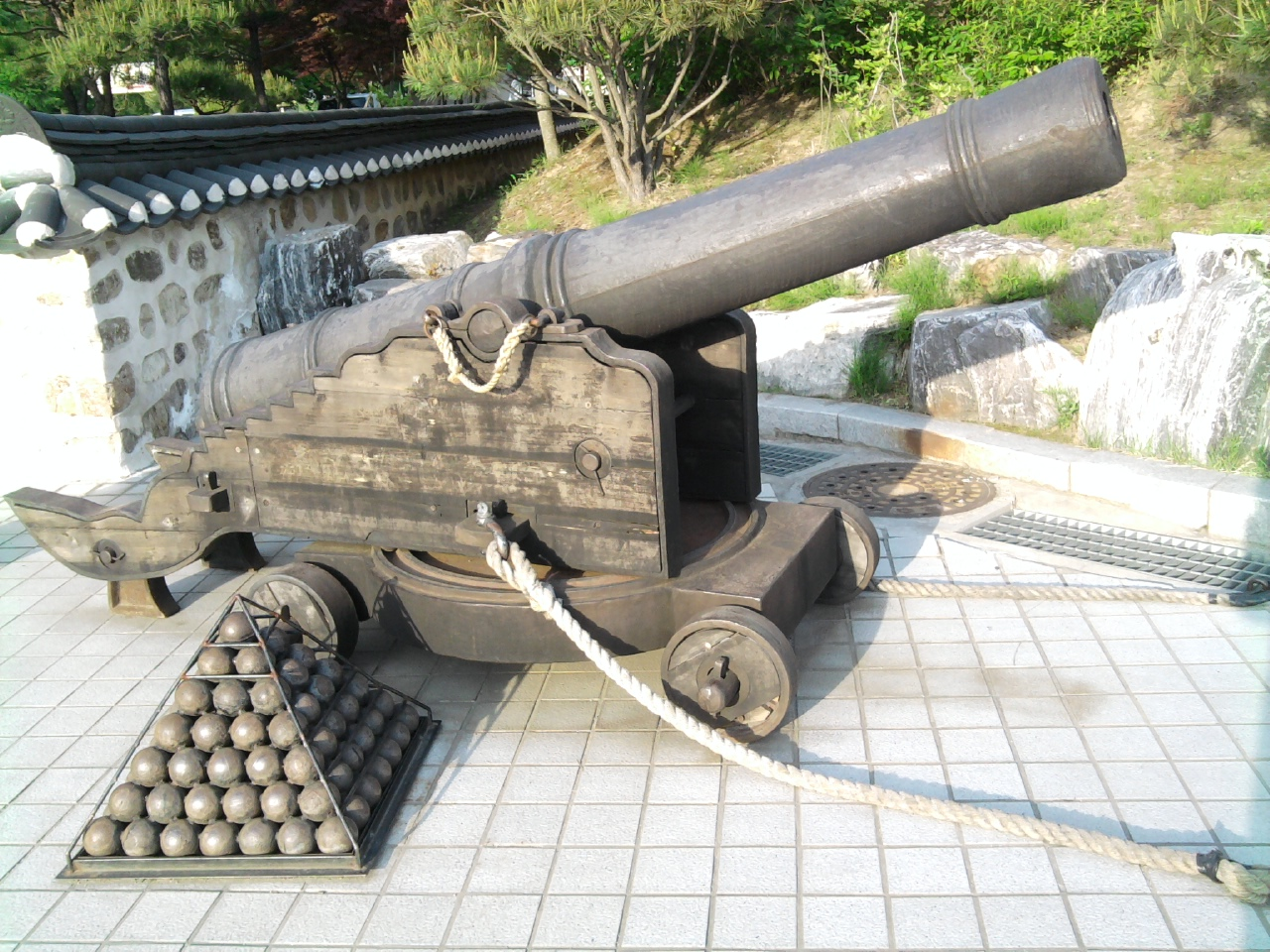
A hong'ipo cannon introduced from the Netherlands by Hendrick Hamel and others in the 1650s

==== Guns ====
In 1432, the Joseon dynasty under the reign of Sejong the Great introduced world's first handgun, named the seungja chongtong (총통) or "victory gun," which serves as a standard Korean gun. It can fire bullets, 15 small pellets, or an iron-tipped arrow. The gunners used the seungja chongtong as a club in melee combat. Other variants were the soseungja chongtong, a handheld cannon attached to a gunstock that fired a bullet and a large arrow; like the seungja, it could only fire by lighting the fuse. The se-chongtong, was a miniature gun held by its cheolheumja (철흠자, iron tong-handle), which allows a quick change of barrel for the next shot, and fires chase-jeon (차세전, a contemporary type of standardized arrow) with a maximum fatal range of 200 footsteps (≈250 meters). The barrel has a total length of 13.8 cm, inner diameter of 0.9 cm, and outer diameter of 1.4 cm. Initially, Joseon considered the gun a failure due to its short effective range, but the chongtong quickly saw use after fielding to the frontier provinces starting in June 1437. The se-chongtong was used by both soldiers of different units and by civilians, including women and children, as a personal defense weapon. The gun was notably used by chetamja (체탐자, special reconnaissance), whose mission was to infiltrate enemy territory, and by carabiniers carrying multiple guns, who benefited from its compact size. In 1596, the seungja were phased out in favor of Japanese-style muskets and arquebuses. The Koreans called these jochong (조총/鳥銃), which means 'An accurate gun can even shoot down a flying bird.'

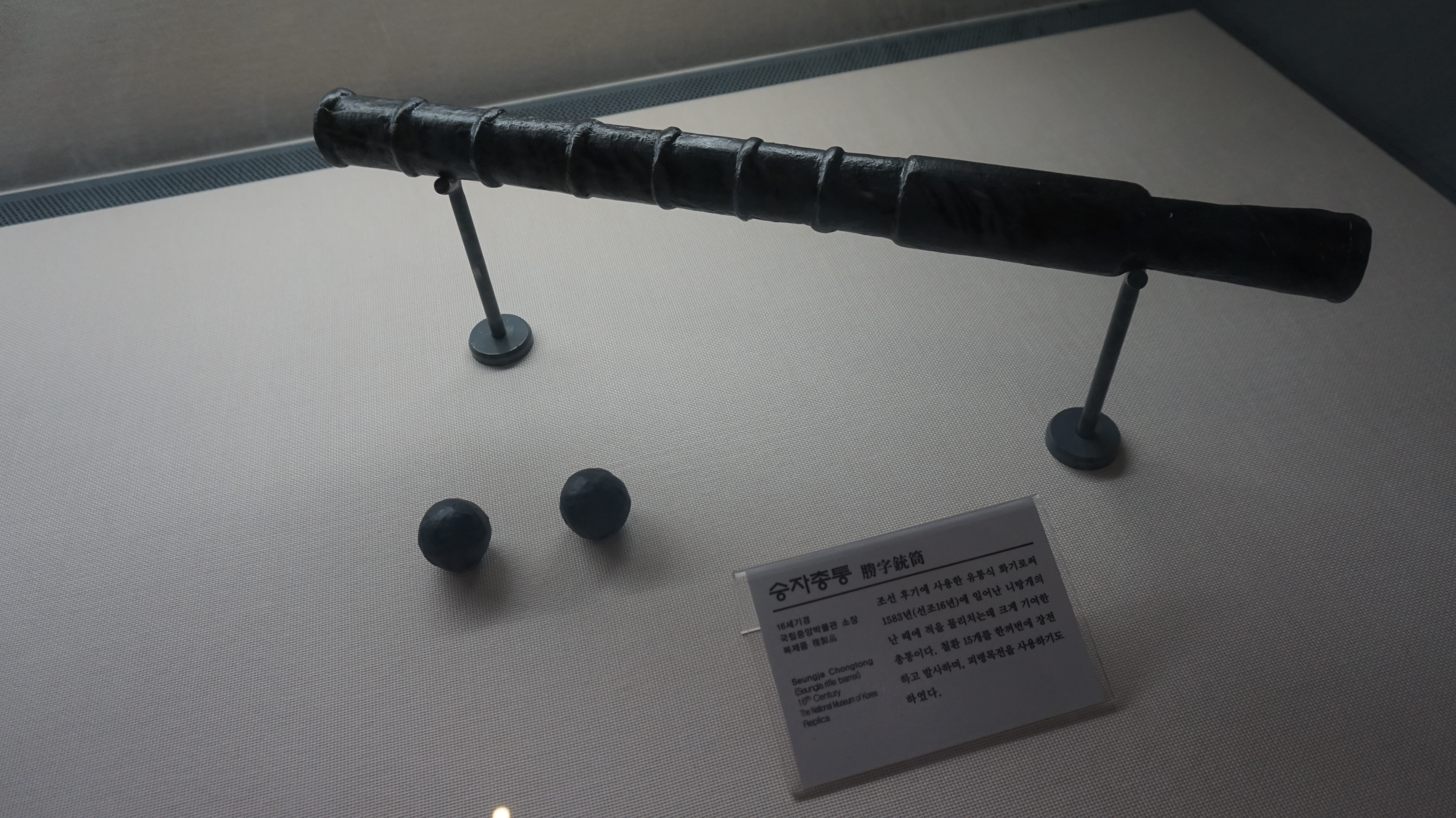
Seungja-chongtong, a hand cannon

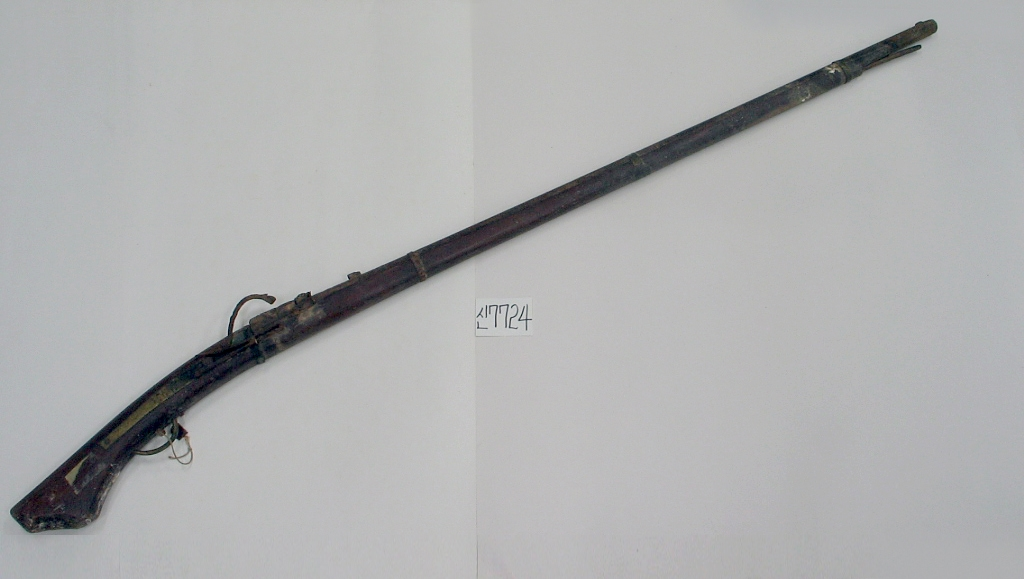
Jochong (조총/鳥銃), the Korean matchlock musket.

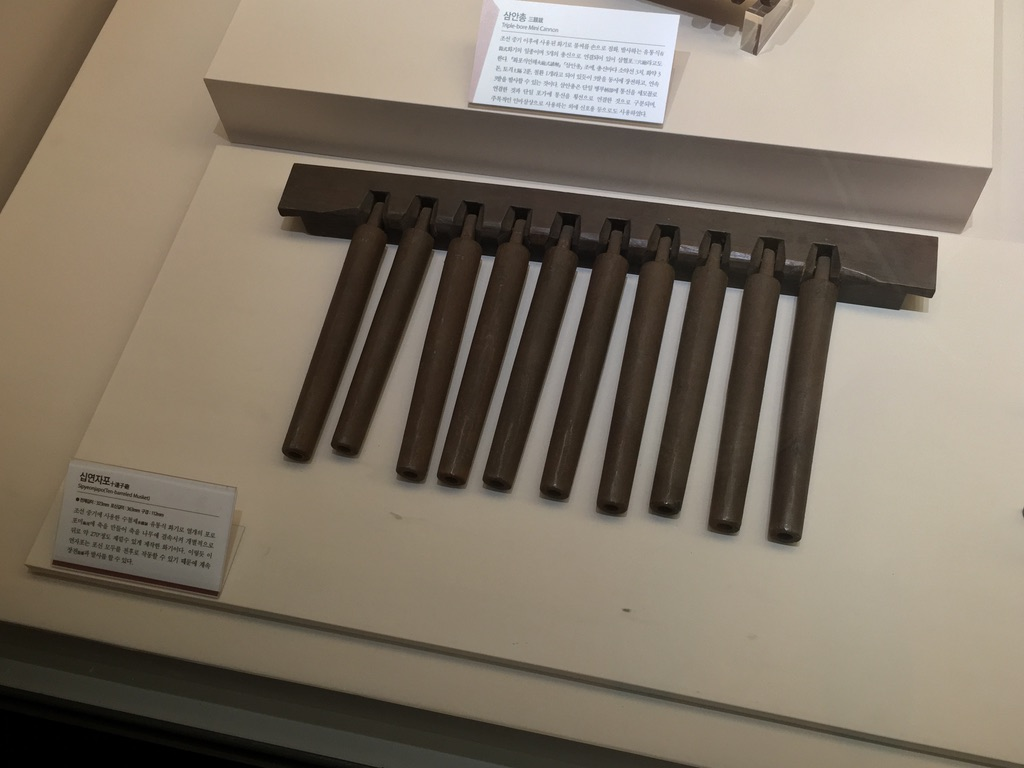
Sipyeonjapo, the ten-barreled musket

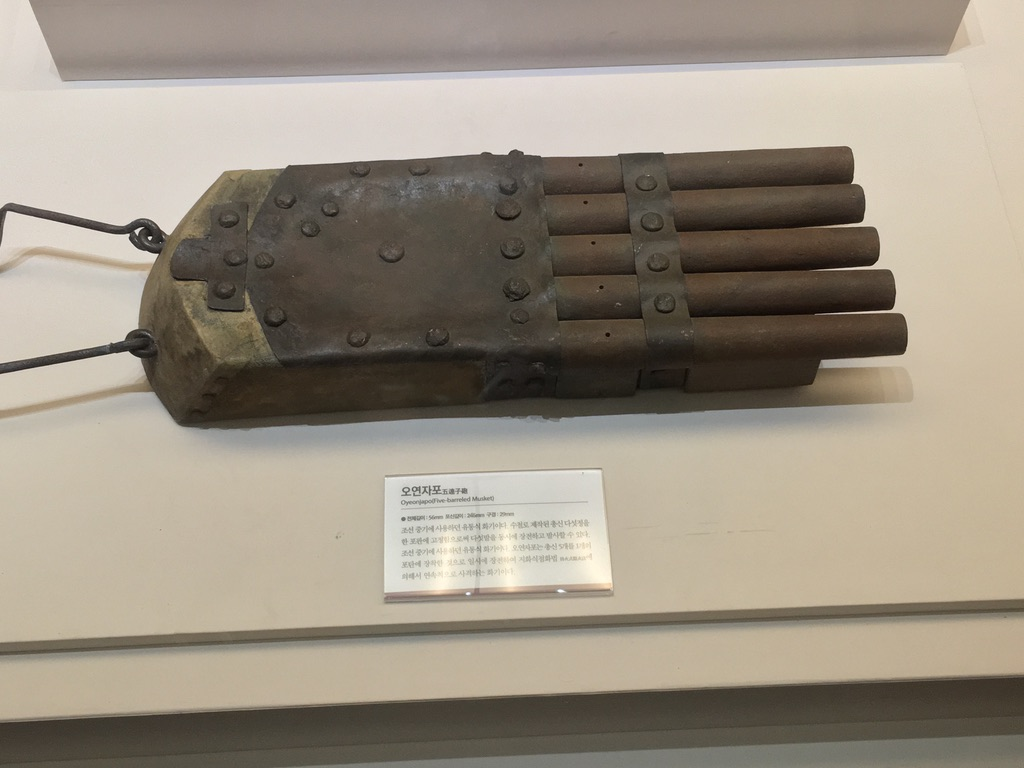
Oyeonjapo, the five-barreled musket

== Strategy and tactics ==
The Joseon Army's defensive strategy was largely influenced by the geography of the Korean Peninsula. The kingdom was surrounded by mountains and seas, which made it difficult for invading armies to penetrate deep into Joseon territory. The Joseon Army took advantage of this natural defense by building fortresses and walls along the borders to protect the kingdom's frontiers. Some of the most famous fortresses include the Namhansanseong Fortress, which protected the southeastern approach to Hanyang (present-day Seoul), and the Hwaseong Fortress, which protected Suwon from invasion.

The use of firearms by the Joseon Army was a significant development in Korean military history. The Joseon Army began to adopt firearms during the late 16th century after Korean soldiers fought the Japanese and encountered the Portuguese and Dutch traders who had brought matchlock muskets to the region. The Joseon Army quickly recognized the potential of firearms and began to produce their own matchlock muskets and cannons. By the 17th century, firearms had become an integral part of the Joseon Army's arsenal, and they continued to be used throughout the dynasty.

The Joseon Army's cavalry force consisted of both light and heavy cavalry. Light cavalry units were used for reconnaissance and raiding, while heavy cavalry units were used for charging enemy lines and breaking through enemy defenses. The Joseon Army's cavalry was particularly effective in the mountainous terrain of Korea, where their mobility and speed allowed them to outmaneuver enemy forces.

Joseon's longtime foe, the Jurchens, adopted cavalry mobile warfare and made numerous raids on Joseon's Northern Borders. The Joseon army focused on developing anti-cavalry tactics to counter them. Their main battle tactic is to arm their infantry and cavalry with long-range weaponry to weaken their cavalry charge from a distance and then engage them quickly and fluently. But in an actual combat situation, the cavalry charges into the enemy's spearhead formation and the battle formation.

During the Imjin War, when the army formed their battle positions like the Joseon cavalry formations against the Jurchens, they were withered down by a hail of Japanese arquebuses. Then, the Japanese ashigaru engaged in close-quarters combat. But what the Koreans lack in numbers can make up for it in topography and geography. The Righteous Army utilized stalling tactics to hamper Japanese supply chains on land, but the central army could not use them until the second half of the Imjin war.

The Joseon Army employed a network of spies and scouts to gather intelligence on enemy forces and their movements. Spies were often used to infiltrate enemy territory and gather information on troop movements, supply lines, and fortifications. Scouts were used to patrol the borders and report any signs of enemy activity. The intelligence gathered by these agents was used to plan defensive and offensive operations and to take advantage of the enemy's weaknesses.

The Joseon Army used various forms of psychological warfare to intimidate enemy forces and boost the morale of their own troops. One of the most common tactics was drumming, where large drums were beaten to create a rhythmic sound that could be heard over long distances. The Joseon Army also used flag waving and shouting to create a sense of fear and confusion among enemy troops. These tactics were particularly effective against inexperienced or poorly disciplined troops.

The Joseon Army sometimes used diplomacy to avoid conflict or to form alliances with neighboring powers. Diplomatic efforts were often led by high-ranking officials, such as the "Uijeongbu" (의정부), who was responsible for foreign affairs. Ambassadors were sent to neighboring kingdoms to negotiate treaties and alliances, and gifts and tribute were often exchanged as a sign of goodwill. Diplomacy was seen as a way to avoid costly and destructive wars and to maintain the stability of the region.

== See also ==
- Joseon Navy
- Joseon Army (late 19th century)
- Joseon Dynasty
- Righteous Army
- Korean–Jurchen border conflicts
- Imjin War
- List of battles during the Japanese invasions of Korea (1592–1598)

== Works cited ==
- Kim Jinwung (2012). A History of Korea: From "Land of the Morning Calm" to States in Conflict. Indiana University Press. ISBN 978-0-253-00024-8.
- Kim Sun Joo (2007). Marginality and Subversion in Korea: The Hong Kyŏngnae Rebellion. University of Washington Press. ISBN 978-0-295-98931-0.
- Pratt, Keith L.; Rutt, Richard; Hoare, James (September 1999). Korea, A Historical and Cultural Dictionary. Routledge/Curzon. ISBN 978-0-7007-0464-4.
- Sin, Hyong-sik (2005). A Brief History of Korea. The Spirit of Korean Cultural Roots. Vol. 1 (2nd ed.). Seoul: Ewha Womans University Press. ISBN 978-89-7300-619-9.
- Yoon, Hong-key (2014). "Geomancy and social upheveals in Korea" (PDF). European Journal of Geopolitics. 2: 5–23.
