= Yi In-jwa's Rebellion =

Rebellion in Joseon Korea

1728 Yi In-jwa's Rebellion
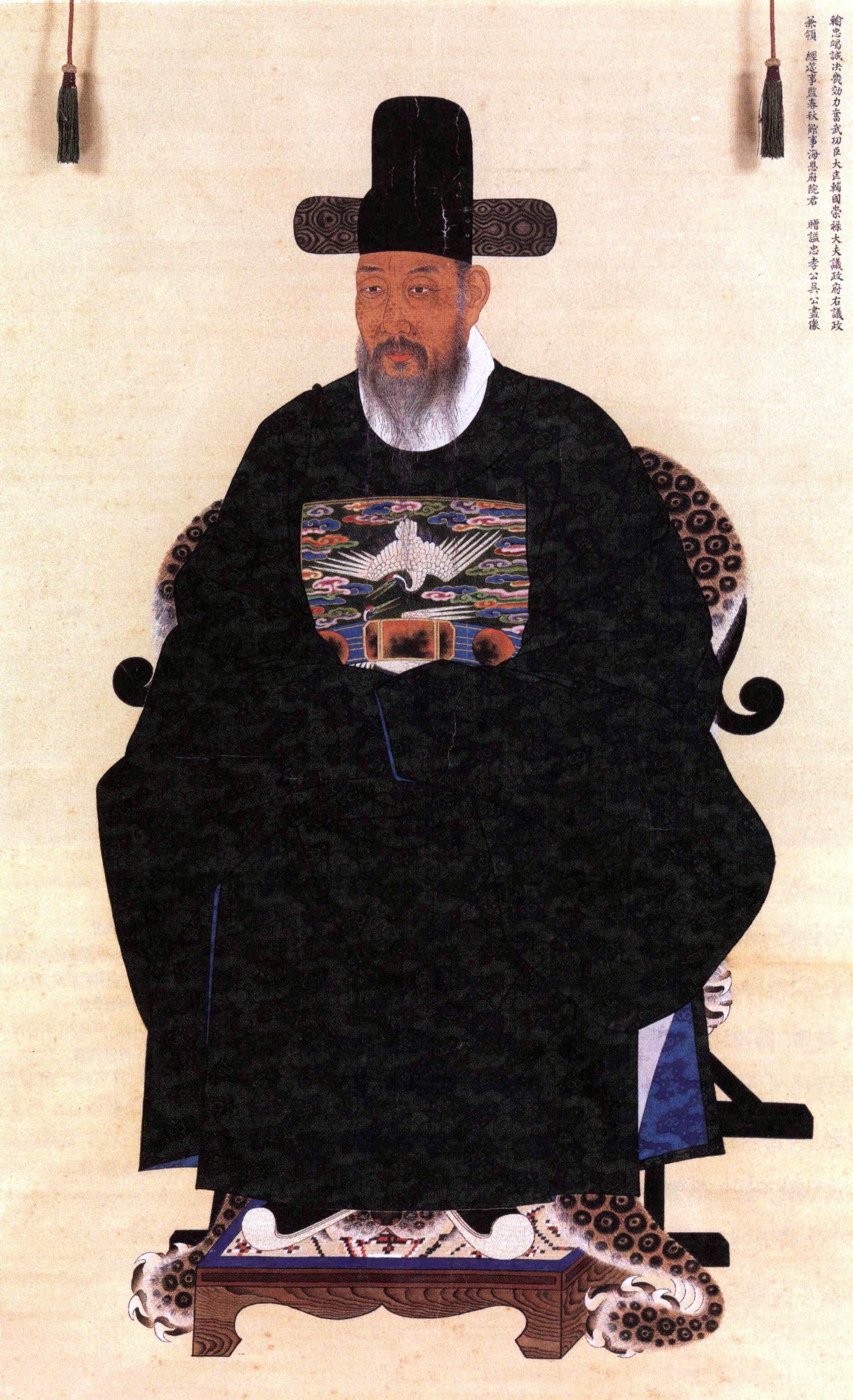
- Portrait of Oh Myeong-Hang
Date	March 15—April 19th, 1728
Location	Gyeonggi Province
Result	Government Victory: Rebellion suppressed

Belligerents
Yi In-Jwa's Rebel Army	Joseon Army

Commanders and leaders
Yi In-jwa; Jeong Hee-Ryeong	King Yeongjo; Oh Myeong-Hang; Park Mun-su; Park Chan-shin; Yi Sam

Strength
70,000	Oh's army: 2,300; Other: 10,000

Casualties and losses
Annihilation	Moderate

- Yi In-jwa's Rebellion
- Hangul: 이인좌의 난
- Hanja: 李麟佐의 亂
- Revised Romanization: I Injwaui nan
- McCune–Reischauer: I Injwaŭi nan

Alternate name
- Hangul: 무신란
- Hanja: 戊申亂
- Revised Romanization: Musinnan
- McCune–Reischauer: Musinnan

Yi In-jwa's Rebellion (Korean: 이인좌의 난; Hanja: 李麟佐의亂), also known as the Musin Rebellion (무신란; 戊申亂), after The name of the year in which it occurred in the sexagenary calendar, was an attempted coup d'état in March 1728 by a coalition of the radical faction of the Namin and the excluded Soron faction. After the death of King Gyeongjong and the ascension of King Yeongjo to the throne, the position of the Noron faction was restored, and Soron, who had instigated the rebellion under the pretext of protecting King Gyeongjong, was punished and excluded from power. Shortly after ascending to the throne, Yeongjo pursued a policy of equal recruitment, believing that factional strife was detrimental to the country's development. In response, the radical faction of the Soron group justified their rebellion by raising suspicions about the circumstances of King Gyeongjong's death and claiming that King Yeongjo was not the legitimate heir of King Sukjong, thereby securing their power. The rebellion began on March 15 when Yi In-jwa captured Cheongju Castle. The rebel forces, marching toward Hanyang (present-day Seoul), were defeated by the royal army, and the support from the Yeong and Honam regions was also suppressed by local forces, leading to the suppression of the rebellion.

== Names ==
The names for this rebellion was also known as the Noksaek Pyroan Rebellion or the Wushinran.

== Background ==
The Joseon Dynasty was in a socially chaotic situation. The common people were facing difficulties due to various tax burdens and economic exploitation by the landlord class. In particular, the burden related to military service was significant. At that time, instead of serving in the military, the common people had to pay a military fabric tax called "gunpo." However, during the process of collecting the military fabric tax, there were cases where it was collected even from the elderly, young children, and even deceased individuals. As a result, the common people who couldn't afford the military fabric tax became wandering outcasts, some of whom formed bandit groups and attacked government offices and landlords. During that time, the bandit group in Jeongeup, Jeolla Province, consisted of over 100 members carrying spears and cannons, and their leader wore armor and rode a horse, indicating a considerable scale and command structure. They also formed alliances with merchants, monks, and baekjeong to expand their influence and strengthen their safety and base. Furthermore, there were frequent incidents of resistance against the authorities. In Yeongdeok, Gyeongsang Province, there were incidents that threatened local officials and tax collectors, and in Gwangju, Jeolla Province, there were uprisings.

The political situation in the central government was also unstable. The Noron faction, following the incident known as "Jeongyudokdae," put King Gyeongjong on the throne and then supported Crown Prince Yeongjo as the next successor. By using Queen Dowager's statement, "The bloodline of King Hyojong and the flesh and blood of the previous kings belong only to the Crown Prince and the successor," they succeeded in appointing Crown Prince Yeongjo as the successor while dispelling suspicions that the Noron faction intended to abolish the Crown Prince.

In response to the movements of the Noron faction, figures such as Nam Guman and Choi Seok-jeong had already retired, and the Soron faction, whose influence had weakened, failed to respond properly, including Park Se-chae's literati moving to the Noron faction. The Namin faction also had a weakened influence due to the events of Gyeongsin Hwangung, Gapsul Hwangung, and the Sin Saok affair. As a result, the Noron faction pushed for the appointment of the Crown Prince as a regent. However, there was strong opposition from the Soron faction and the Namin faction, and some factions within the Noron faction, such as Gwon Sang-yu and Park Chi-won, also sympathized with the opposition. As a result, the Noron faction eventually disappeared from the political stage through a series of incidents from 1721 (during the reign of King Gyeongjong) to 1722 (during the reign of King Gyeongjong).

== Death of Gyeongjong ==
During King Gyeongjong's reign, he suffered from severe illnesses beginning from his time as the crown prince. Due to concerns about the succession of the crown prince, Sukjong secretly entrusted the title of Prince Yeongin (延礽君: later known as King Yeongjo) to Yi Ye-myeong (李頤命) in the private meeting known as Jeongyudokdae (丁酉獨對) in 1717, which involved only Sukjong and Yi Ye-myeong.

Even during his final years, King Gyeongjong did not actively participate in state affairs, including the selection of his crown prince, and he struggled to handle national affairs properly during his reign. In response, the Noron faction expedited the enfeoffment of Prince Yeongin and the appointment of a regent based on the reason that King Gyeongjong had no heir and was plagued by illnesses.

In contrast, the Soron faction used the pretext of protecting King Gyeongjong to instigate the appointment of a regent. However, when King Gyeongjong died after only four years on the throne and Yeongjo succeeded to the throne, the Soron faction's pretext of the regency was criticized, and the Noron faction's position was restored.

However, when King Gyeongjong died in 1724 and King Yeongjo ascended to the throne, the situation rapidly changed. Shortly after his ascension, King Yeongjo released Min Jin-won (the older brother of Queen Inhyeon), who had been exiled due to the Sinimsa incident, despite opposition from the Noron faction. This became a turning point, and petitions criticizing figures such as Kim Il-gyeong, Yu Bong-hwi, and Choi Seok-hang, who were representative figures of the Soron faction, continued to be submitted. As a result, King Yeongjo banished Kim Il-gyeong and punished Mok Ho-ryong, who had caused the Sinimsa incident. In 1725 (during the reign of King Yeongjo), Min Jin-won, Jung Ho, and Yi Gwan-myeong, who belonged to the Noron faction, were appointed to high-ranking positions, and the Sinimsa incident was determined to be a false accusation, leading to the execution of those responsible for the false charges. Thus, the Noron faction secured a foothold in the central government.

== Preparations ==
When Yeongjo, supported by Noron, ascended to the throne, Soro's political standing became uncertain. Furthermore, with Yeongjo favoring figures from the Noron faction, Soro's anxiety only grew. In 1725 (the first year of Yeongjo's reign), when Kim Il-kyeong was removed, a faction of Soro finally formed the Musindang. Musindang was led by Park Pil-hyeon, Lee Yu-ik, and they recruited figures like Han Se-hong and Lee In-jwa from the Nam-in faction. They held negative views towards Noron and Yeongjo, believing that they had to remove Noron in order to regain political power.

Musindang advocated the illegitimacy of Yeongjo's succession to the throne and decided to support Lee Tan, the great-grandson of Crown Prince Sohyeon, as their candidate. They also established a strategy of "responding from the capital to disturbances in the frontier." This strategy took advantage of the unstable social situation at the time. These attempts relied on the roles of Lee In-jwa and Jeong Se-yun. Lee In-jwa, being from the Nam-in faction, faced difficulties in advancing his career in the government at the time. He planned the rebellion with close associates such as Park Pil-hyeon and recruited allies like Yi Ho in Anseong, Yi Il-jwa in Gwacheon, Jeong Hee-ryang in Geoje, and Min Won-bo in Chungju. They also made contact with prominent local figures in the Yeongnam region, utilizing their status as members of the Nam-in faction. Thus, Lee In-jwa played a mediating role between the Gyeonggi, Hoseo, and Yeongnam factions. Jeong Se-yun, on the other hand, formed the Nokrimdang in 1724 (the year of Yeongjo's accession) and formed an alliance with Na Sunghae in Naju, based on a foundation of 600-700 refugees. Musindang planned to make Nokrimdang their main force and entrusted its command to Lee In-jwa.

Under the pretext of raising suspicions about King Gyeongjong's death and claiming that Yeongjo was not King Sukjong's biological son, they aimed to depose Yeongjo and crown Prince Milpunggung Tan (密豐君坦: the great-grandson of Crown Prince Sohyeon) as king. This intention served to unite their followers, justify their rebellion, and also manipulate public sentiment. Starting from 1725 (1st year of Yeongjo's reign), Park Pil-hyeon and others based on the Dangun ideology selectively identified individuals in various regions who were considered sympathetic to the regent's power.

=== Obstacles ===
During the preparations for the rebellion in the central and provincial regions, a problem occurred. While the central region was planning the rebellion for April, Yi In-jwa, Jeong Se-yun, and others in the provincial region had been gathering and mobilizing military forces in Yangseong and Jinwi in Gyeonggi Province since early March. The Muhwadang faction, in this way, was gradually escalating the rebellion, creating a certain time difference between the central and provincial regions. However, Musindang's rebellion plan faced obstacles when the Jeongmi Hwangguk (change of government) took place in 1727 (the third year of Yeongjo's reign), leading to the downfall of the Noron regime. As Musindang, which opposed Yeongjo and Noron, Yeongjo's appointment of some factions from Soro and Nam-in caused internal divisions. Consequently, the rebellion plan led by Park Pil-hyeon, Han Se-hong, and Lee Yu-ik was temporarily suspended.

While the central rebellion plan was put on hold, preparations for rebellion continued in the provinces, with Lee In-jwa and Jeong Se-yun at the center. Lee In-jwa, being strongly inclined towards anti-Noron sentiments among the Yeongnam faction, believed that the Yeongnam faction would actively participate once the rebellion was planned. Therefore, Andong and Sangju were entrusted to Jeong Hong-su, Geochang and Anum to Jeong Hee-ryang for rebellion preparations. Lee In-jwa himself was in charge of the Gyeonggi region. Meanwhile, Yi Ho and Jeong Se-yun prepared for rebellion in Honam. Yi Ho met with Na Soongdae in Naju through Namanchi and requested cooperation, stating that Taiin Hyungam Park Pil-hyeon and Pyeongan soldier Yi Saseong were also preparing for rebellion. Jeong Se-yun met with Seong Deuk-ha and Kim Su-jong in Buan and secured their pledge to join the rebellion. He also secretly prepared hundreds of arrows to send them to Nokrimdang.

=== Final Preparations ===
As local preparations for rebellion progressed, movements resumed in the central government. The central leadership maintained close contact with Yi Saseong, who was serving as a Pyeongan soldier at the time, and they also prepared for rebellion with figures like Park Pil-hyeon, who was in Taiin. Particularly, Park Pil-hyeon, Lee Yu-ik (李有翼), and Shim Yu-hyeon, both members of Musindang felt threatened by the sudden death of King Gyeongjong and the potential loss of their political positions, planned to recruit the excluded Namin members and sought to eliminate Yeongjo and the Noron faction, trained soldiers and stole gunpowder in Damyang to transport it to Hanyang for the rebellion. Park Pil-hyeon also formed alliances with Song Ha in Gobu, Kim Su-jong in Buan, and Yang Ik-tae in Sunchang, and they circulated forged documents in Jeonju and Namwon, claiming that Yeongjo assassinated Gyeongjong.

In early March 1728, about 300 soldiers, including yangban (aristocratic class) and about 50 cavalry, gathered at the assembly points in Anseong, Pyeongtaek, Yangseong, and Goesan. However, the rebel forces gathered from various places were poorly equipped and lacked sufficient power. They moved to Sosapyung to replenish weapons and horses and began to build up their strength. The rebels even seized horses at Gacheon Station and received economic support from wealthy people in various areas. They also engaged in political propaganda, claiming the participation of political figures such as Kim Jung-gi and Jeonra soldier Jo Gyeong, in order to secure military supplies, provisions, and recruit soldiers. The propaganda had a significant effect, and rumors about the rebels were exaggerated and spread, causing administrative and security paralysis in the southern part of Gyeonggi Province and some areas in Hoseo.

On March 12, Yi Ung-bo and others who arrived in Andong attempted to incite rebellion according to Yi In-jwa's instructions, but they failed due to the non-cooperation of the local residents. However, Yi Ung-bo succeeded in raising troops in Anum and Geocheong, but it was difficult for the rebel forces in these areas to expand to other regions due to geographical conditions.

On March 14, their intentions were exposed, and supporters such as Choi Gyu-seo (崔奎瑞) from Bongjo-ha (奉朝賀), and Kim Jung-man (金重萬) from Yangseong-in (陽城人) actively advocated for the gathering of troops in various regions. When reports of the rebel forces' movements were received from various parts of Gyeonggi Province, King Yeongjo closed the city gates and mobilized government forces from outside Seoul to strengthen the city's defenses. Yeongjo established loyal troops and ordered increased security at the Three Main Gates.

== Order of battle ==
=== Rebels ===
In the capital, Lee Ha (李河), Yang Myeong-ha (梁命夏), and Yun Deok-yu (尹德裕) were involved, while in the provinces, Jeong Jun-yu (鄭遵儒, later renamed Hwalyang) in Anseong, Na Man-chi (羅萬致) in Eunjin, Jo Deok-gyu (趙德奎) in Yeosu, Im Seo-ho (任瑞虎) in Icheon, Jeong Se-yun (鄭世胤) in Anseong, Lee Ho (李昈) in Jinwi, Min Won-bo (閔元普) in Chungju, Yi In-jwa in Cheongju, Shin Cheon-young (申天永) in Cheongju, Kim Hong-su (金弘壽) in Sangju, and Lee Il-jwa (李日佐) in Gwacheon participated. They also collaborated with Yi Sa-seong (李思晟) from Pyeongan Province and Nam Tae-jing (南泰徵) from Geumgun County. They spread rumors by associating suspicions about King Gyeongjong's death with Shim Yu-hyeon, who was the younger brother of Queen Shin (沈氏) and had witnessed King Gyeongjong's passing. As a result, incidents of rumors and anonymous letters occurred throughout the country, and they recruited private soldiers (家丁) and slaves, as well as mobilizing bandits (明火賊) and others as an army.

=== Government ===
They strengthened the defense of the castle gates through the Military Training Agency, Capital Garrison and the Royal Guard Command from the Five Army Camps and dispatched troops to various fronts. Yeongjo personally appointed Oh Myeong-hang as Chief Military Commissioner of the four provincial armies, Park Chan-shin as the commander of the central army, and Park Mun-su as an official. The moderate faction, including Soron, moved quickly to stabilize public opinion and dispatched a punitive force of 2,000 troops, led by Oh Myeong-hang, to suppress the rebellion. Yeongjo, faced with the Soron faction's opposition, formed a command headquarters not with strategists from the Nolon faction but with veteran officers from the Soron faction. This background indirectly demonstrated the intention to undermine the legitimacy of the rebellion by showing that the policy of equal recruitment extended beyond the factions and embraced talent from all sides.

== Rebellion ==
The rebellion led by Yi In-jwa began on March 15 when they captured Cheongju Castle. The rebel forces attacked the military camps, killed soldiers Lee Bong-sang, Nam Yeon-nyeon, and military officer Hong Rim, and seized Cheongju. They also established multiple flags for King Gyeongjong and set up his ancestral tablets to worship. They appointed Gwon Seo-bong as a magistrate, and Shin Cheon-yeong as a general, and sent proclamations to various towns to recruit soldiers and distribute provisions. Their power expanded significantly. Local officials and the village gentry in Cheongju joined the rebels, and their numbers rapidly increased. As a result, the rebel forces expanded to Hwanggan, Hoein, Mokcheon, and Jincheon and headed towards Anseong and Juk-san. The rebels dispatched envoys to these areas, distributed rice and divided the land, and recruited soldiers. Thus, the occupation of Cheongju Castle, which began with 200 to 300 people, gained support from various regions and classes.

=== Surrounding the capital ===
Meanwhile, the rebel forces in Gyeonggi Province and Hoseo, as they expanded their power centering around Cheongju Castle, expected support from the Yeongnam and Honam forces. However, it was not easy to achieve solidarity in Yeongnam and Honam. In the Yeongnam region, Jeong Hee-ryang, the fourth-generation descendant of Jeong On, recruited commoners under the pretext of relocating ancestral tombs, and together with Yi Wung-bo (Yi In-jwa's younger brother), they easily seized Anum's Gohyeon-chang on March 20, threatening Anum and Geochang counties with an ultimatum. With the help of the Jo Seong-jwa family, who were acquaintances of Jeong Hee-ryang residing in Hapcheon, they then conquered four counties and districts, including Hapcheon and Hamyang.

In response, Hwang Seon, the governor of Gyeongsang Province, appointed Lee Bo-hyeok as the leader of the right-wing, and Jung Yang-bin as the leader of the left-wing, to command the surrounding government forces and suppress the rebellion. The rebel forces attempted to join forces with the rebel forces in Chungcheong Province by passing through Hamyang after Geochang, but they failed. In the Honam region, the rebel forces collaborated with Park Pil-hyeon, who was exiled to Mount Mooju as a chief conspirator, and others. However, they failed to establish a connection with the Jeolla governor, and Park Pil-hyeon was arrested and executed in a village in Sangju, while Park Pil-hyeon hid in Gobu County, Heungdeok, but was arrested and executed.

In Jeolla Province, Jeong Pyeol-hyeon, the magistrate of Taein, planned to maintain control of nearby regions and mobilize cavalry, but he participated in the distribution of Gwaseo salt and did not follow the mobilization of troops. Furthermore, the plan for Jeonju to advance to Cheongju together with Gamyeong-gun was leaked in advance. Park Pil-hyeon, who was being exiled while armed, intended to enter Jeonju with about 30 soldiers, but he disbanded when the mobilization of troops in Taein failed. As a result, the planned mobilization of troops in Honam did not take place as planned. Similarly, Pyeongan soldier Yi Sa-seong, who was stationed in Muan, did not mobilize troops as promised. As a result, there was a disruption in the planned rebellion between the central and provincial regions, and the rebel forces in Cheongju were forced to march directly to the capital.

=== Government response ===
Meanwhile, the government, while the rebel forces were gathering in Yangseong, Sosa, and other places, preemptively blocked the connection between the central and provincial rebel forces based on a report submitted by Choe Gyu-seo. They also arrested residents of Hanyang, descendants of rebel sympathizers such as Yun Hyu and Yi Uijing, and families of Kim Il-kyeong and Mok Ho-ryong. Furthermore, in order to prevent a surge in rice prices caused by the rebellion and the resulting public discontent, they transported the stored rice near the Han River to the safety of the castle.

On March 17, when the invasion of Hanseong was imminent, Oh Myeong-hang offered to take charge of the campaign. King Yeongjo immediately accepted this and appointed Park Moon-su as a military official. Oh Myeong-hang, Chief Military Commissioner the four provinces, spread false information that he would go to Jiksan in Gyeonggi Province.

=== Battle of Anseong and Jik-san ===
On March 23, they arrived in Anseong, it was already dark. They captured a spy named Choi Seop, who provided valuable information about the enemy's situation and the identity of their leader. They searched his pockets and found a badge belonging to Yi Bong-sang. Shortly after, several torches approached from a distance, accompanied by shouting and cheering. A scout quickly reported that enemy troops had invaded the camp. At that moment, a violent storm raged, and the night was pitch black. They couldn't even discern the surrounding area because they hadn't managed to light a fire. The soldiers, who hadn't eaten, didn't know what to do. However, Oh Myeong-hang remained calm and motionless. He ordered his troops to refrain from hasty shooting and to wait until the enemy approached before releasing their arrows. They prepared for death and fed their horses. Drawing strength from the situation, the camp stabilized.

On March 24, just outside the camp, they discovered the bodies of over a hundred enemy soldiers who had been killed by bullets. Most of the enemy forces were composed of elite troops disguised as civilians from various villages, such as those in Jeongjujin and Mokcheon. They had secretly gathered in the mountains of Cheongryongsan near Anseong. However, the villages below the mountains had become strongholds for the enemy, so no one could come to report the situation to Anseong's army. Additionally, the enemy's spies were repeatedly captured by the government forces, so the enemy only knew that a large army was heading towards Jiksan and were unaware that the camp had been relocated to Anseong. In the darkness, they mistook the camp in Anseong's army as their own and indiscriminately shot arrows and fired cannons, but none of them reached their target. Suddenly, they saw the astonishing sight of a divine machine arrow being shot by the main army. Finally realizing that the military forces of the capital had arrived, they panicked and retreated. Unable to withstand the threat, most of the scattered enemy forces fled.

Yi In-jo and Park Jong-won, the leaders of the rebels, led a small group of soldiers and retreated into the mountains of Cheongryongsan, waiting for reinforcements from Juk-san's army. However, the main army was unaware of the rebel's stronghold. Upon seeing Kwon Hee-hak capturing an enemy spy, Min Je-jang, immediately calmed down and sent a letter. Finally, they learned that the rebel troops were located in the mountain valleys and villages around Daecheon, which were about 5 li away from the military camp. From a distance, Oh Myeong-hang observed the terrain. Cheongryong Mountain curved like a lying cow, surrounding three sides for hundreds of steps. Within it, there were 50 to 60 villages, and the front was a plain.

Immediately, Park Chan-shin was appointed as the commander of the central army. He divided the infantry into three units and the cavalry into one unit to lead and guard the area. He instructed them, "Lower the flags, refrain from making any noise, take off your armor and helmets, and quickly advance. The infantry unit should go through the back of the mountain, occupy the high and rugged areas first. The second unit should divide into two wings, shoot cannons and fire rockets to set the villages on fire. If we follow this strategy, considering the situation, the enemy will definitely flee forward. The cavalry unit should trample them down." Additionally, he ordered Min Je-man, "Lead the military forces in Anseong and head south to create a diversion and block the enemy's escape route." However, due to the impatience and lack of discipline of the vanguard troops, they raised their banners and made noise while marching north. The enemy noticed this and quickly abandoned their military equipment and supplies, rushing up the mountain to set up their camp. They raised a red sunshade and commanded with a white flag. The military forces were deprived of the advantage of the terrain, and they could only watch from above without being able to approach. Kwon Hee-hak, realizing that there was an enemy commander in the middle of the village, grabbed a village grandmother and threatened her. He asked Im Man-bin, "Aren't you a warrior? Why are you afraid of such a trivial enemy?" Im Man-bin replied angrily, "I should die honorably." He then asked for someone to follow him, saying, "Who will follow me?" Around 50 soldiers, including Jung Cho-sun, expressed their willingness to follow him.

Finally, as they advanced into the village, enemy commander Park Jong-won's words were fierce, so he did not draw his sword, causing a delay. In the meantime, the army had already arrived. Park Jong-won shouted, "You've bought yourself time until your life comes to an end!" and drew his sword, attempting to escape. Jo Tae-seon quickly shot an arrow, hitting him in the neck. Park Jong-won took a few steps before collapsing. Im Man-bin dismounted and beheaded him and several of his officers. He then tied their heads to a pole and ran up the mountain. The enemy, seeing this, lost their morale. Moreover, their bows and cannons were soaked from the rain, rendering them useless. Finally, they fled to the mountaintop. At that moment, a strong northeast wind blew, aiding the pursuing army from the northwest. The enemy, attempting to escape south along the ridges, saw Min Je-man's disguised soldiers and turned back westward. Their situation became even more chaotic, and they scattered in all directions, abandoning their weapons and flags. The pursuing army killed over 100 enemy soldiers. Cavalry officer Im Pil-wi captured one enemy and rode with him under his armpit, impressing those who witnessed it. They captured the enemy's baggage and their red umbrellas and flags. Initially, the pursuing army attacked the enemy while they were on the mountain, creating an illusion of retreat and luring them. However, once both sides withdrew from the mountain, the outcome became uncertain. Officers climbed up the hill to observe and became extremely anxious, unsure if the pursuing army was being overwhelmed by the enemy. Oh Myeong-hang laughed and said, "The enemy will not escape." Shortly before noon, messengers arrived to deliver the news, and in the afternoon, Park Chan-shin sounded the drums and horns. He hung several enemy heads on a pole and brought them, causing the crowd to cheer and the soldiers and horses to rejoice. They wrote a report, enclosing the heads of Park Jong-won and others, and sent it to military official Shin Man in Seoul for urgent transmission. Meanwhile, the royal court was anxiously awaiting the intelligence day and night. Upon seeing the northeast wind arise that day, they all said, "It is advantageous for the king's army," and indeed, they achieved a great victory.

=== End of the rebellion ===
The defeat of the rebel forces in Anseong and Juk-san dealt a significant blow to the rebel forces in the Samnam region. With the main rebel forces defeated and their leaders Yi In-jwa, Gwon Seo-bong, and Mok Ham-gyeong captured and executed, the rebel forces in other regions gradually collapsed. The government forces pursued and suppressed the remnants of the rebellion, resulting in the capture or surrender of many rebel soldiers. When the government forces led by Oh Myeong-hang crossed Chupungryeong Pass in early April, the rebel forces in the Yeongnam region had already been suppressed by the local government forces. The government forces returned to Geochang on April 19, and King Yeongjo personally went out to the Sungnyemun Gate to receive their triumph. Although the scholar-officials took the lead in pacifying the rebellion, most of the instigators were scholars, which weakened their position and led to their disadvantage in the subsequent political situation. On the other hand, the implementation of the Tangpyeong policy, which had been advocated since the beginning of King Yeongjo's reign, could further solidify the justification and strengthen royal authority, contributing to the stability of the political situation.

== Aftermath ==
The rebellion of Yi In-jwa, which once boasted its power by occupying Cheongju Castle, ultimately failed due to the defeat in the battles of Anseong and Juk-san. The failure can be attributed to conflicts among the leadership, a passive attitude towards the rebellion by the central ruling class through the surrender of the capital, and the absence of a unified preparation system.

Yeongjo attributed the cause of the rebellion to factional strife. He realized that despite his efforts to recruit talented individuals and implement policies of reconciliation to end factional strife, the strife persisted, resulting in the rebellion. He also acknowledged that the people's resentment towards the government persisted due to the continued factional strife while they suffered from famine and poverty. Based on this reflection, Yeongjo implemented the Gyuyu Restriction the following year, in 1729, and actively pursued policies of reconciliation.

Following the rebellion of Yi In-jwa, it had a subtle influence on the direction of the political situation. The ruling faction's political standing weakened as they were involved in the rebellion, and the opposition faction was not necessarily in a politically advantageous position as they were responsible for instigating the rebellion. However, it created an opportunity for the moderate faction, which criticized the power struggles and conflicts between the ruling and opposition factions, to come into power.

Subsequently, with the cooperation of moderate members of the opposition faction such as Hong Chi-jung and Kim Heung-gyeong, the moderate factions of both the ruling and opposition factions established a foundation for governing the country together. This laid the groundwork for a moderate ruling regime led by the factions of both the ruling and opposition parties.

== Impact ==
The rebellion of Yi In-jwa was a significant challenge to the government during that time. The rebel forces managed to gather support and occupy Cheongju Castle, expanding their influence in the region. However, due to difficulties in achieving solidarity with other rebel forces in Yeongnam and Honam, as well as preemptive actions by the government, their plans were disrupted. The government forces were able to strengthen their defenses and launch a successful counterattack, leading to the defeat of the rebellion.

The rebellion of Yi In-jwa had social and economic factors at its core. It was fueled by grievances of the lower classes, such as peasants and commoners, who were burdened by heavy taxes and exploitation. The rebel forces promised land redistribution and economic relief, which garnered support from various regions and classes. However, the rebellion ultimately failed to achieve its goals due to a lack of coordination and effective leadership.

The suppression of the rebellion had a significant impact on the subsequent political and social landscape. The government implemented stricter control measures and increased surveillance to prevent future uprisings. It also carried out punitive measures against those involved in the rebellion, including executions and confiscation of property. The rebellion served as a reminder of the government's vulnerability to popular discontent and highlighted the need for reforms to address social and economic inequalities.

== See also ==
- Three Military Garrisons
- King Yeongjo
- Political factions during the Joseon dynasty

== Bibliography ==
- Cho, Ch’anyong [조찬용]. 2003, 1728 nyŏn Musinsat’ae koch’al. [1728년 무신사태 고찰/An enquiry into the 1728 Musillan situation], Seoul: iolive
- Jackson, Andrew David. 2011, The 1728 Musillan Rebellion: Resources and the Fifth-Columnists, Unpublished PhD dissertation. University of London
- Jackson, Andrew David. 2016, The 1728 Musin Rebellion: Politics and Plotting in Eighteenth-Century Korea, University of Hawaii Press
- Oh, Gap-Kyun [오갑균]. 1977, "英祖朝 戊申亂에 관한 考察. On the Musin(戊申)-Revolt under the Reign of King Youngcho," 역사교육 21 (5): 65-99 (in Korean)
