= Three Military Garrisons =

1630–1897 Korean military unit

- Coat of Arms of Joseon
- Active: 1704
- Disbanded: 1884
- Country: (Korea) Joseon
- Allegiance: (Korea) King of Joseon
- Branch: Joseon Army
- Type: Capital Guard
- Size: 246
- Part of: Five Army Camps
- Garrison/HQ: Yeonhwabang

Insignia
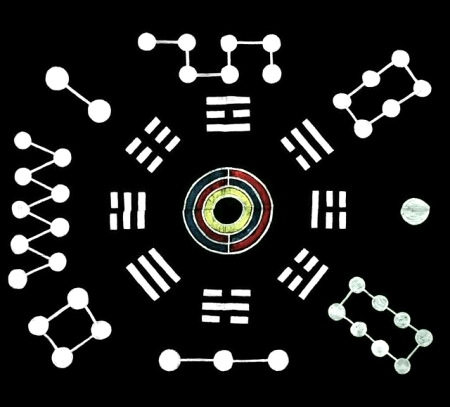
- Ensign

The Three Military Garrisons (Korean: 삼군영; Hanja: 三軍營) was a central military camp formed during the development of the capital defense system in the late Joseon Dynasty. It consists of the Military Training Agency, the Royal Guard Command, and the Capital Garrison. The soldiers of the Three Military Garrisons lived in Hanyang and played a key role in guarding the king, guarding the palace, defending the capital, and maintaining public order.

== Summary ==
In 1704, King Sukjong assigned the Military Training Agency, the Royal Guards Command, and the Capital Garrison to guard the Three Military Gates (Samgunmun, 삼군문; 三軍門) to strengthen Hanseong's defenses and escort the king.

In 1745, after the 1728 Yi In-jwa's Rebellion, King Yeongjo realized the confusion of duties between these camps. He reorganized the gates in greater detail by dividing the responsibilities of the military camps to maintain order in the capital.

In 1746 (the 22nd year of the reign of King Yeongjo), in order to defend the capital, Yeongjo issued an order for the establishment of fortified positions and divided the civilian population of Seoul's five districts into three divisions, known as the Three Military Garrisons (삼군영; 三軍營).

The Garrisons were abolished in 1884 as part of modernizing the Joseon Army.

== Three Garrisons ==
=== Military Training Agency ===
Military Training Agency was founded in 1593, when the Imjin War of 1592-1598 was in progress. As the Joseon army was struggling against the Japanese army's rifles, a new army was created as a countermeasure. At this time, the Samsubyeong (three-handed soldiers) system (soldiers using rifles, bows, swords, and spears) was formed, referring to the “Gihyosinseo (紀效新書)” written by Cheok Gye-gwang (戚繼光), a general of the Ming Dynasty who contributed to the eradication of Japanese pirates. It has been done. It was originally a temporary organization, but it continued to exist even after the end of the Japanese Invasion of Korea and became the core of the central army. As a result, about 5,000 standing troops continued to be stationed in Hanyang.

=== Royal Guards Command ===
The Injo government, which came to power through a coup, sought to strengthen the defenses of the capital to prepare for the rapidly changing situation inside and outside the country. The establishment of Eoyeongcheong began with the fact that the 260 Eoyeong troops recruited in preparation for the battle against Later Jin were not disbanded but were instead assigned to guard the king during the Yi Gwal Rebellion in 1624. Later, in 1652, it was expanded and expanded as a result of King Hyojong's northern expedition plan, and it came to have the appearance of a central military camp.

=== Capital Garrison ===
Sukjeong established the Capital Garrison (Geumwiyeong) to defend Hanyang and escort the king with 85,000 soldiers. Among them are 30,000 professional soldiers based on the military elements from the other four military camps. It was reassigned as an independent army by King Yeongjo. Geumwiyeong was the last of the three military camps to be built, and was established to strengthen Hanyang's defenses and reduce the financial burden caused by the training of standing soldiers. In 1682, Capital Garrison was established by merging the soldiers of Byeongjo's Jeongchocheong (精抄廳) and the Military Training Agency's Military Training Special Division (訓鍊別隊), completing the Three Military Garrisons system that defended Hanyang along with the Military Training Agency and Royal Guards Command.

== Organization ==
Each division created flags to represent their respective units. The Training Dojang had a yellow flag, the Geumwiyeong had a blue flag, and the Eoyeongcheong had a white flag. These flags indicated the names of each district and the affiliation with Samgunmun.

=== Composition ===
Yeonhwabang in the eastern part, which corresponds to today's Wonnam-dong, Yeonji-dong, Hyoje-dong, and Chungsin-dong areas. This area was the main residence of soldiers, as it was where the main headquarters and branch offices of Hyeonryeondogam and Eoyeongcheong were located next to Changdeokgung Palace and Changgyeonggung Palace.

Soldiers who came to Seoul from rural areas had great difficulties finding a home in Hanyang. Due to the low salary, the soldiers of Samgunyeong engaged in various occupations such as commerce and agriculture. These activities of the soldiers of the Three Military Regions played a significant role in the functioning of the capital, Hanyang, as a city. They were soldiers who protected Hanyang, but at the same time they were a new type of city dweller who made a living through various occupations. They were the ones who made Hanyang serve as a city by playing an axis in Hanyang's economy.

With a total of 246 soldiers, Samgunyeong conducted patrols throughout the entire area of Hanseongbu. Each division divided the responsibilities into eight shifts, with a total of 24 leaders leading 222 soldiers, conducting nightly patrols within and outside the city walls.

=== Equipment ===
The Three Military Garrisons wore regular uniforms and oil-soaked raincoats when raining. They are armed with matchlock muskets, bows, and breech-loading swivel guns (Bulang-kipo ("불랑기포[佛郞機砲]")).

== Duties ==
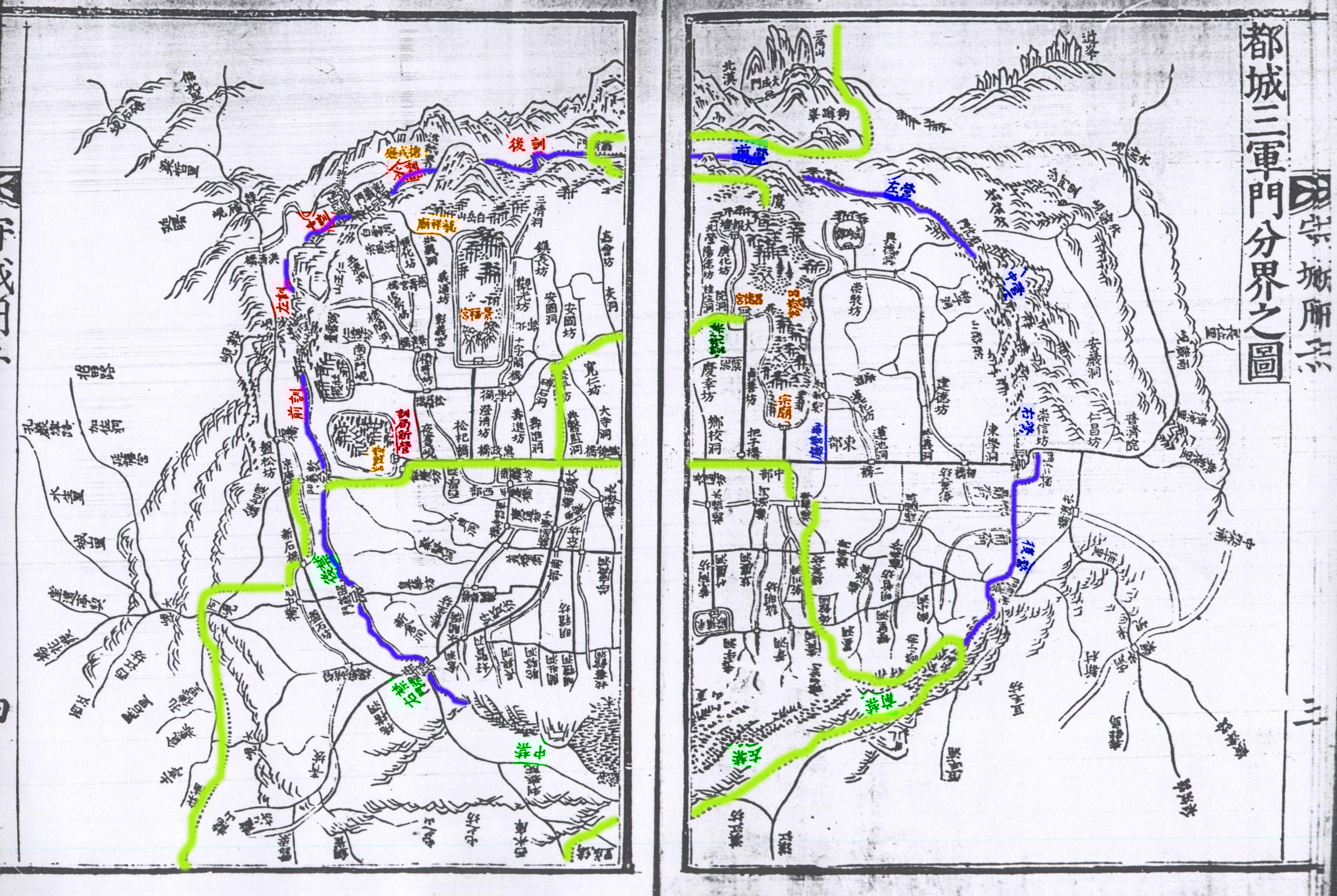
Illustration file to explain the Doseongsam-gun gate boundary map.

The defense responsibilities of Three Military Garrisons were as follows: The Training Dojang primarily defended the northern and parts of the western and central regions. The Geumwiyeong primarily defended the southern and parts of the western and central regions. The Eoyeongcheong primarily defended the eastern region and parts of the southern, central, and western regions.

Soldiers were required to take the martial arts examination in 1759. In addition to the defense of the capital city, guarding the palace, and military training, the soldiers of the Samgunyeong were also mobilized to maintain the city, such as Juncheon (a project to dig deep into the bottom of Cheonggyecheon to allow water to flow easily) and Geumsong (a project to ban logging of pine trees).

In addition to the defense of the capital city, guarding the palace, and military training, the soldiers of the Samgunyeong were also mobilized to maintain the city, such as Juncheon (a project to dig deep into the bottom of Cheonggyecheon to allow water to flow easily) and Geumsong (a project to ban logging of pine trees).

To ensure the defense of the capital, including the palace and the areas within and outside the city walls, strict patrols were conducted. The Training Dojang patrolled from Donuimun to Jonggak in the west, from Sungnyemun to Mapo in the south, and from Hyeonginmun to Jongam in the east. The Geumwiyeong patrolled within the city walls, with Dongdaemun and Seodaemun as their boundaries, patrolling from Namsan Mountain to Samcheong-dong in the north. Outside the city walls, they patrolled the areas around Seobinggo, Mapo, and Mangwonjeong. The Eoyeongcheong, within the city walls, patrolled from Ogansumun to Cheonggyecheon, and from Seodaemun to Jonggak. Outside the city walls, they patrolled from Ahyeon to Mohwagwan, including Hongje-won, and from Dongdaemun to Wangsimni, Ttukseom, Jegi-dong, and Jongam-dong, as well as Mapo and Yongsan.

Samgunyeong inspected the city walls and palace grounds daily to ensure there were no breaches. If any breaches were found, the responsible division took charge of repairing and fortifying those areas. The areas of responsibility for Samgunyeong were from the eastern side of Sukjeongmun to Musaseok, which was the responsibility of the Training Dojang, and from Donuimun to Namchon near Gwanghuimun, which was the responsibility of the Geumwiyeong. Additionally, from Gwanghuimun to Sukjeongmun was the responsibility of the Eoyeongcheong.

== Notable members ==
- Lee Ji-geon
- Lee Woo-bok

== See also ==
- Joseon
- Joseon Army
- 1728 Yi In-jwa's Rebellion
