= Capital Garrison =

1596–1884 Korean military organization

- Coat of Arms of Joseon
- Active: 1682
- Disbanded: 1881
- Country: (Korea) Joseon
- Allegiance: (Korea) King of Joseon
- Branch: Joseon Army
- Type: Capital Army
- Role: Garrison Army; Royal Guard
- Size: 14,098
- Part of: Five Army Camps
- Garrison/HQ: Hanyang

Insignia
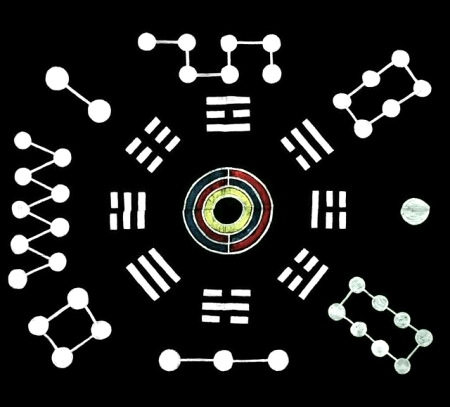
- Ensign

The Capital Garrison (Geumwiyeong, (금위영 (禁衛營) was one of the central military camps established during the reign of King Sukjong in the late Joseon dynasty. It was referred to as one of the "Five Army Camps" (오군영) along with the Military Training Agency (Hullyeongdogam (訓鍊都監), Royal Guard Command (Eoyeongcheong (御營廳), Command of the Northern Approaches (Chongyungcheong (摠戎廳), and the Royal Defence Command Sueocheong (守禦廳), which formed the core of the central military system in the late Joseon period. In terms of defending the capital city, it was also called the "Three Military Gates" (삼군문) along with the Military Training Agency and the Royal Guard Command. Capital Garrison was created by integrating the Jeongchocheong (精抄廳) and Hullyeonbyeoldae (訓鍊別隊) in the early years of King Sukjong's reign. Its main responsibilities included the defense of Hanyang Fortress, the protection of palaces such as Changdeokgung (昌德宮) and Changgyeonggung (昌慶宮), and providing security during the king's processions.

== Background ==
During the Imjin War, the military system of the early Joseon period, known as the "Owi" (Five Guards) system, collapsed. In its place, the Military Training Agency was established. Subsequently, the Royal Guard Command, Royal Defence Command, and the Command of the Northern Approaches were established, forming the central military in the late Joseon period. Capital Garrison was the last of these five military camps to be created. It was established in 1682, during the 8th year of King Sukjong's reign, by integrating Jeongchocheong and Hullyeonbyeoldae.

Jeongchocheong was originally a unit created by selecting excellent cavalry from the Sokogun (束伍軍), a military unit in Gyeonggi Province, for the purpose of defending the capital city and guarding the royal family during King Injo's reign. It later evolved into an independent military camp called Jeongchocheong as the military expanded during the reign of Hyojong. Just before being integrated into Geumwiyeong in the early years of King Sukjong's reign, the number of economic supporters attached to Jeongchocheong, known as Bohin (保人), who were economic supporters attached to the military, reached 12,474.

Hullyeonbyeoldae was a unit established in 1669 (10th year of Hyojong's reign). Among the central military camps, Hullyeongdogam was the only one operated as a standing army, which placed a heavy financial burden. The government demanded that Hullyeongdogam be operated as a standing army like other military camps. The standing army system involved rotating local farmers who served in Seoul, which did not incur significant costs. However, there was considerable opposition, and ultimately the Military Training Agency could not be abolished. Instead, a separate unit called Hullyeonbyeoldae, which operated under the jurisdiction of Hullyeongdogam was established and operated as a standing army.

== Establishment ==
Capital Garrison was established in February 1682 by the proposal of Yeonguijeong Kim Su-hang (金壽恒, 1629-1689) and later submitted Kim Seok-ju (金錫胄, 1634-1684), who served as the Commander of Training and the Minister of War. It was created by combining the Jungcho Army (精抄軍) and the separate units of the Training Department (訓鍊都監), based on the "Military Reform and Adaptation Plan" (軍制變通節目) promulgated in March 1682.

The Jincho Army, which was part of the Byungjo (Military Reserve) under the command of the Training Division, and the Gyeongbeon Army, which was part of the Training Bureau, were merged to form a single military camp. In other words, Kim Seok-ju, transferred 707 out of the 5,707 soldiers of the Training Bureau to the Byungjo, thus reducing the number of soldiers in the Training Bureau. Simultaneously, the Jincho Army and the Training Division were combined to form one battalion (營), five companies (部), twenty platoons (司), and 105 squads (哨). They were further divided into ten groups for rotation purposes, and a "protective unit" called "Geumwi" was established for their operation.

In 1682 (8th year of King Sukjong's reign), Jeongchocheong and Hullyeonbyeoldae were integrated to formally establish Geumwiyeong as a military camp. The establishment of Geumwiyeong had complex reasons. The most important reason was the logic of cost reduction. From the reign of Hyojong to the early years of Sukjong, there were severe disasters, and central resources were scarce, and the people's lives were difficult. Amidst this, the military expenditure also increased due to the expansion of military preparations for northern expeditions from Hyojong's reign to Sukjong's reign. Therefore, the establishment of Geumwiyeong was a measure to reduce military expenses by integrating Jeongchocheong and Hullyeonbyeoldae, two military camps.

Firstly, it aimed to reduce military expenses by integrating Jeongchocheong and Hullyeonbyeoldae, as there were severe disasters and scarce resources during that time. Secondly, Geumwiyeong was established to strengthen the defense of the capital city. It had the same operational system and organizational structure as Hullyeongdogam and played a crucial role in the defense of the capital. Thirdly, there were political reasons for its establishment, driven by the influence of Kim Seok-ju, the Minister of War at the time. Kim Seok-ju wanted the Ministry of War to directly control the organized military forces, and Geumwiyeong allowed for that oversight.

Secondly, it was established due to the practical need to strengthen the defense of the capital city. Geumwiyeong had the same operational system and organizational structure as Military Training Agency, and together with Military Training Agency, it played a crucial role in the defense of the capital city. The Royal Defence Command and Command of the Northern Approaches were stationed in the outer regions for the defense of Gyeonggi Province, while Military Training Agency and Royal Guard Command guarded Hanyang Fortress. With the establishment of Capital Garrison, the "Three Military Gates" system was formed, which defended the capital city.

Thirdly, there were political reasons for the establishment of Capital Garrison. Kim Seok-ju, who was the Minister of War at the time, exerted a strong influence. The Ministry of War was a key organization dealing with military issues, but the military camps existed as independent organizations under the Ministry of War. However, Kim Seok-ju wanted the Minister of War to directly control the organized military forces. Capital Garrison allowed the Minister of War to oversee the military camps under the Ministry of War.

Although Capital Garrison was established in 1682 under the Ministry of War (8th year of King Sukjong's reign), it was not a completely independent military camp. It was not until 1754 (30th year of King Yeongjo's reign) that Capital Garrison, like other military camps, had a separate "Daejang" (Grand General) and became fully independent as a military camp. Until the late 19th century, Capital Garrison served as one of the "Three Military Gates," playing a central role in the central military.

== Organization ==
The Capital Garrison served as a central government agency and a military camp, so it had two organizational structures. One was the organization of yangban officials as central bureaucrats, and the other was the structure of military units. The Capital Garrison played a crucial role in the defense of Hanyang and the protection of the city walls and palaces. Their hierarchical organization and military structure allowed for efficient coordination and execution of their duties. By fulfilling their responsibilities, the Capital Garrison contributed to maintaining the security and stability of the capital.

Capital Garrison, which was one of the key military camps responsible for guarding the king and defending the capital, along with the Training Bureau and the Training Administration, had its importance reflected in the fact that the Minister of War held the position of its commander. It had a structure in which the Geumgun (Royal Guard) cavalry and infantry formed a pair. Over time, the Capital Garrison expanded in size, and additional units such as ten squads of Byeoljwasu (Auxiliary Soldiers) and one squad of Byeoljungcho (Auxiliary Scouts) were added, resulting in a total of 135 squads, including five companies, twenty-five platoons, and 125 squads of Byungbyungdo Infantry (牙兵). The main focus of the military force was the provinces excluding Pyeongan and Hamgyeong.

=== Command ===
It consisted of the following positions: one Dojejo (chief councilor of the Central Military Training Institute), one Jejo (councilor) who also served as a Byungjo Panseo (Minister of War). The Dojejo and Jejo held dual positions, and the actual person in charge of the Capital Garrison was the Capital Daejang (Commander-in-Chief). The Capital Daejang, along with the leaders of the Royal Guard Command and Military Training Agency, was responsible for the military gates and was usually chosen from capable military families, individuals connected to the royal family or external nobility, or descendants of meritorious service to the state.

The upper command structure of the Capital Garrison included advisory institutions such as administrative positions such as Daejang (General), one Junggun (Lieutenant General), one Jung-3-pum Byeoljang (Colonel) (captain of artillery), four Cheonchong (Thousand Commanders)(infantry commander). Below them were three Gisajang (cavalry commanders) who directly commanded the cavalry, five Pachong (Captain)(squadron commanders) who were in charge of the five Hyanggun units. The cavalry were organized under the Jung (cavalry) and Yeong (infantry) units, and the Hyanggun units were connected in the order of Sa-Cho-Gi-Dae-O. There were twelve Oebanggyeompachong (Deputy Commanders in the Outer Frontier), and forty-one Chogwan (Scout Officers). In addition, there were two Jongsagwan (Officials in Charge), twelve Gyo-ryeonggwan (Training Officials), and ten Gipaegwan (Flag Officials), among others. These officials served as commanders of organized units, were responsible for the training and education of soldiers, and engaged in various tasks as elite forces.

In addition to this military command structure, there were also officers responsible for military training, such as Gyoryeonggwan (training officials) and Gipae-gwan (flag officials), as well as special positions for those skilled in martial arts or those who had contributed to the country, such as Byulmusa (special warrior) and Byulgiwi (special cavalry). There were also Dojejo-gun (military officials) and Byulgun (special officials) who served as messengers and attendants for Dojejo and Jangsin (senior officials). In addition, there were Kwonmugungwan (martial arts officials) established to provide martial arts training to the yangban ruling class, as well as Jongsagwan (staff officers) in charge of military affairs and Chamsa (staff officers) for the Geumsong (forbidden pine) of the Hanseongbu.

=== Division ===
The plan submitted by Kim Seok-ju partially accepted the discussions on the reform of the Training Agency that had been proposed among the officials. First, the plan included reducing 707 out of 5,707 personnel in the Training Agency and sending them to separate training units operated as reserve soldiers. It also combined the training units with the Jungcho Army, establishing Geumwiyeong with a total of 14,098 regular soldiers (正軍) and 78,000 reserves (保人). As a result, the financial burden of the Training Agency, which had been significant, was reduced to a fixed number of 5,000 personnel. Originally, Capital Garrison was under the jurisdiction of the Minister of War, but in 1754 (30th year of King Yeongjo's reign), it gained independence and had its own commander, called Capital Daejang.

Sukjeong established the Capital Garrison (Geumwiyeong) to defend Hanyang and escort the king. The Geumwi Camp was established in March 1682 (the 8th year of King Sukjong's reign). Kim Seok-ju (김석주), who concurrently served as the Chief Training Command Officer (Hunryeondojang, 훈련도감 대장), proposed the reorganization of the military system, combining separate units (훈련별대, Hunryeongbyeoldae) and elite troops (정초군, Jeongchogun) to create an independent military camp called Geumwi Camp. It was reassigned as an independent army by King Yeongjo. The Geumwi Camp, also known as "Shinyeong," had its main camp located outside Changdeokgung Palace's Geumho Gate (金虎門) in the central Jungseonbang. The camp was also referred to as "Shinyeong" (新營). As for its subordinate camps, the Nambyeol Camp (South Separate Camp) was established in Naksanbang, southern Nakseondong, along with Namchang (South Warehouse) and Hanamchang (Lower South Warehouse) in the vicinity. The Seoyeong Camp (West Camp) was located across from Changdeokgung Palace's Gyeongchumun, while the Namyong Camp (South Camp) was situated above Gyeonghuigung Palace's Gaeyangmun.

In 1704, during the military reform, in order to match the scale of the Training Agency, it was reorganized into a rotational rank system with a total of one battalion, five companies, twenty-five platoons, and 125 squads. In the early stage of its establishment, since the Jincho Army, which was part of the Byungjo, constituted the majority, the Ministry of War held the position of commander as before. However, in 1754 (30th year of King Yeongjo's reign), an independent military camp was established for the first time with the appointment of a separate commander, not the Ministry of War.

=== Composition ===
Secondly, let's learn about the formation structure of the military forces. Initially, when the Jungcho Army and Training Units were integrated, Capital Garrison was composed of 5 units, 20 companies, and 105 squads, which were divided into 10 rotations for rotation duty. Later, as the numbers increased, it was reorganized into 5 units, 25 companies, and 125 squads, including 10 squads of Pyeongan Province soldiers and 1 squad of Byeoljungcho (special scouts), totaling 136 squads. Since approximately 127 personnel were assigned to each squad, the total number of soldiers could be estimated to be around 17,000.

However, this is the total number of personnel, and the actual number of soldiers on duty was much smaller. The soldiers of Capital Garrison were mainly composed of local militias (hyanggun) and the Gyeonggisa (capital artillery) and Byeolpajin (separate artillery) units from six provinces excluding Pyeongan Province and Hamgyeong Province. They took turns coming up for duty in rotations of 25. In other words, since they came up every 25 squads starting from 125, the number of militia coming up at once was only 5 squads. Since there were about 127 personnel in one squad, approximately 635 personnel came up for duty at a time. However, this only applies to the local militias, and in addition to the militias, there were various types of troops such as hyang gisa (local cavalry), byeolpajin (special formation breakers), and gongjangabyeong (artisan soldiers), each operating according to their own standards. Some troops, like Gyeonggisa (capital knights), also served as reserve forces. Therefore, it is not easy to define the number and characteristics of the Geumwiyeong military personnel who came to Hanyang (capital city) uniformly.

In addition to the basic troops, there were 100 Wonnyeok (officers) who were office workers or collectively referred to as Yeokbu (官部). The Byunggun, there were other units such as the Hyanggisu (Rural Cavalry), which was the successor of the Byeolhyowi (Auxiliary Guards), and 150 cavalry of the Gyeonggisu (Capital Cavalry), which was the successor of the Hyanggisu. There were also 160 artillery troops called Byeolpajin (Separate Artillery), 50 craftsmen soldiers called Gongjangabyeong (Artisan Soldiers), 12 gate guards called Sumungun (Gate Guards), 15 elite soldiers called Geumsonggun (Imperial Pine Tree Guards), 10 instructors, 17 baggage and horse troops called Chijungbokmabun (Supply and Transport Horse Soldiers), 48 flag bearers called Agisu (Child Flag Bearers), 470 waiting troops called Daenyeongun (Waiting Soldiers), 7 shop guards called Suhopyun (Shop Guards), 700 maritime cavalry called Haeseohyanggisu (Haeseo Rural Cavalry), and 56 troops called Pyohagun (Standard Lower Soldiers). Additionally, soldiers such as the Noryangjin Army, which started as a separate camp, were also incorporated into the Geumwi Camp.

== Duties ==
The task of defending Hanyang's city walls and protecting the palaces was the most important duty of the Capital Garrison. They guarded the city walls and protected the surrounding areas of the palaces through patrolling. The duties of the Capital Garrison, as specified in the compiled "Yukjeonjorye" during the reign of King Gojong, include the defense of the city walls and palaces, guarding the palaces, patrolling the city walls and palaces, protecting the eight military stores (gunpo-palcheo), reconnaissance and ambush, enforcing restricted areas, dredging the Juncheon River, and capturing tigers. Let's examine these duties divided into three categories.

Their duties varied depending on their rank and role, such as Jangbeon or Beonche (番遞) and Sayeok (official service), and included calculating the number of days worked to determine their salary. The Hyanggun served for two months, rotating every 25 days for a total of five rotations. The Gyeonggisa, which consisted of Hwanghaedo Hyanggisa (local defense forces), served for long periods, while the Byeolpajin served in 16 rotations.

=== Three Military Garrisons ===
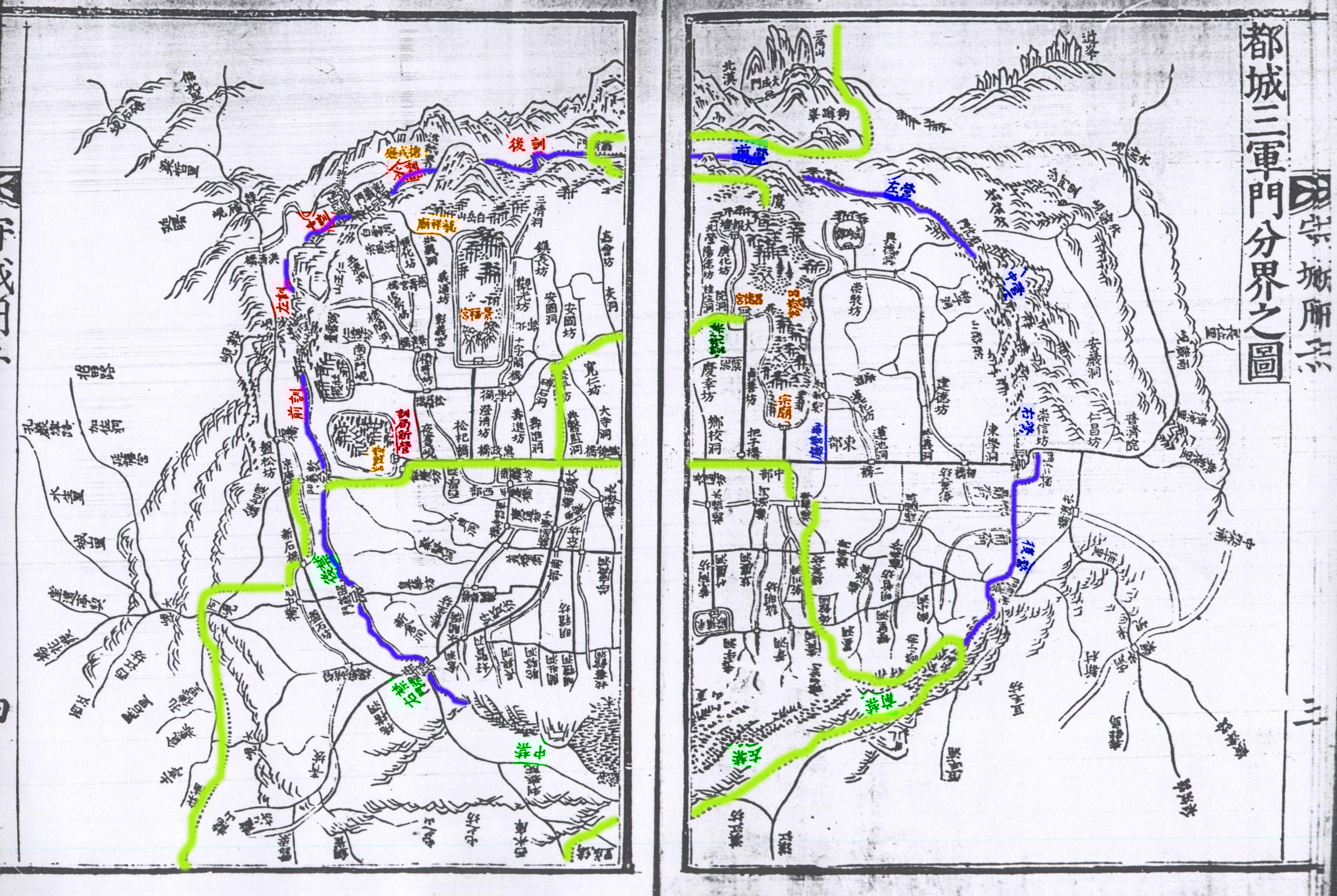
Illustration file to explain the Doseongsam-gun gate boundary map.

The Three Military Garrisons (Samgunyeong, 삼군영; 三軍營) was a central military camp formed during the development of the capital defense system in the late Joseon Dynasty. It consists of the Military Training Agency, the Royal Guards Command, and the Capital Garrison. The soldiers of the Three Military Garrisons lived in Hanyang and played a key role in guarding the king, guarding the palace, defending the capital, and maintaining public order. The defense of the city walls and palaces, as well as guarding and patrolling. The city walls surround Hanyang with four main gates and serve as the city's boundaries. The "Doseongsamgunmunbungejido" shows how the defense of the city walls was divided among three army camps. The Capital Garrison guarded from Donuimun (Gate of Benevolence and Righteousness) in the west to Sungnyemun (Gate of Exalted Ceremonies) in the south, and to Gwanghuimun (Gate of Extended Joy) in the south small gate. Moreover, they divided the walls of Changdeokgung and Changgyeonggung (eastern palaces) and Gyeonghuigung (western palace) into three sections, similar to the city walls, and guarded them through three military gates. There were reconnaissance and ambush duties. Reconnaissance and ambush involved escorting the king's processions and making preparations to prevent any unexpected incidents. When the king stayed outside the city walls, reconnaissance troops were sent to strengthen the defense, and additional soldiers were stationed as reserves to prepare for any possible disturbances. There were the duties of enforcing restricted areas, dredging rivers, and capturing tigers. These were irregular tasks performed as needed. Enforcing restricted areas involved monitoring the logging of timber around the city walls. Dredging rivers referred to the periodic excavation of the Cheonggyecheon River, which flowed through the city walls, to prevent flooding. Capturing tigers referred to the task of capturing tigers that appeared near the city walls.

=== Finance ===
The Capital Garrison received salaries from the state and serving for an extended period as long-term soldiers (jangbeongun, (장번군)). The financial operations of the Geumwi Camp were managed by various funds such as Gwanboju (official funds)ju5, Jaboju (capital funds)ju6, Byeolpajinbo (separate artillery funds), and later the Haeseohyanggisa (maritime defense forces). The total compensation amounted to about 90,000 individuals. The establishment of the Capital Garrison aimed to reduce the financial burden on the country by streamlining the Training Bureau, which was operated by national finances, and to ensure the military power for the defense of the capital. However, as various types of troops and officers increased over time, it not only faced financial shortages but also increased the burden on the taxpayers. In the later stages, the Hyanggun units were gradually halted (tingban) for various reasons, and they were replaced by the Supoju (tax collection units) to cover the national finances.

== Dissolution ==
After the establishment of Capital Garrison, issues such as increasing military expenses led to the emergence of arguments for its abolition. Eventually, the Capital Garrison was strengthened for a while when Prince Heungseon Daewongun was in power, but in 1881, during the 18th year of King Gojong's reign, it was absorbed into Jangeoyeong. In the military reform of 1895, during the 32nd year of King Gojong's reign, the concept of military camps was abolished, and a new military system was established.

== See also ==
- Joseon Army
- Five Army Camps
- Three Military Garrisons
