= Five Army Camps =

1630–1897 Korean military unit

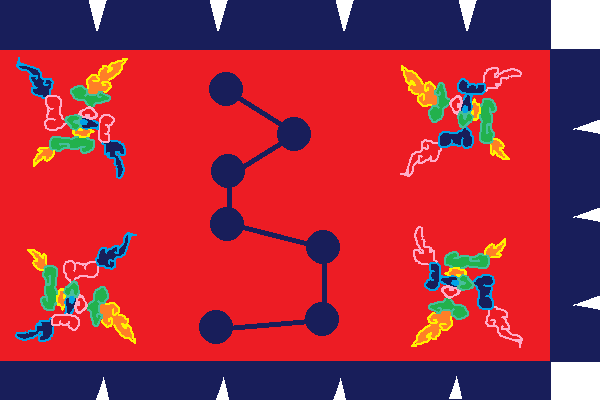
- Choyogi, a flag used by the Five Army Camps.
- Active: 1596
- Disbanded: 1884
- Country: (Korea) Joseon
- Allegiance: (Korea) King of Joseon
- Branch: Joseon Army
- Type: Central Army
- Role: Capital Guard
- Garrison/HQ: Hanyang
- Engagements: Yi Gwal's Rebellion; Later Jin invasion of Joseon; Qing invasion of Joseon; 1728 Yi In-jwa's Rebellion

The Five Army Camps (Korean: 오군영; Hanja: 五軍營; RR: Ogunyeong) was a central army and system established after the Imjin War for the defense of the capital city and its outskirts. Among them, the central military camps for defending the capital include the Military Training Agency (Hoonryeondo-gwan), Royal Guards Command (Eoyeongcheong), and Capital Garrison (Geumwiyeong). The defense of the outskirts of the capital was entrusted to the Command of the Northern Approaches (Chongryungcheong) and Royal Defense Command (Suyeochong). Among these, the Military Training Agency was established in 1593 (the 26th year of King Seonjo's reign) during the Imjin War, making it the earliest camp to be established. The Royal Guards Command was established in 1623 (the 1st year of King Injo's reign), followed by the Command of the Northern Approaches (Chongryungcheong) in 1624 (the 2nd year of King Injo's reign), and the Royal Defense Command (Suyeochong) in 1626 (the 4th year of King Injo's reign). Then, in 1682 (the 8th year of King Sukjong's reign), the Capital Garrison (Geumwiyeong) was established, leading to the transition from the Five Guard system (Owigun) to the Five Military Camps system.

== Background ==
In 1592 (the 25th year of King Seonjo's reign), when a Japanese army of about 200,000 invaded Joseon, the central military system ranked fifth in the early Joseon period and the regional defense system of jingwan (鎭管) and jeseungbangnyak (制勝方略) failed to fulfill their roles. Therefore, the royal court raised the need for a new military organization and expedited the reorganization of the military system to overcome the war.

The organization of the new military institution played a significant role in the Ming Dynasty's military tactics. During the Imjin War, when 40,000 Ming soldiers came to assist Joseon, General Nak Sang-ji (駱尙志) of the Ming Dynasty mentioned the importance of military training to Yu Sŏngnyong. Upon receiving the permission of King Seonjo, Liu Sung-ryong trained Nak Sang-ji in military tactics, including the use of weapons such as gongbang (棍棒), deungpae (籐牌), nangseon (狼筅), jangchang (長鎗), dangpa (鐺鈀), and ssangsudo (雙手刀).

== Organization ==
The Five Army Camps (ogunyeong) defended Hanseong and the surrounding fortresses primarily in Gyeonggi Province. Each king established one or more camps during their reign. In 1622–1624, Injo established three more camps to counter the Qing invasions after Yi Gwal's Rebellion, the Royal Guards Command (Eoyeongcheong), Command of the Northern Approaches (Chongyungcheong), and the Royal Defense Command (Sueocheong). Command of the Northern Approaches and Royal Defense Command were responsible for defending the outskirts of the capital, with Bukhansanseong and Namhansanseong as their central strongholds. The Capital Garrison, also known as Shinyeong, had its main camp located outside Changdeokgung Palace's Geumho Gate (金虎門) in the central Jungseonbang.

=== Military Training Agency ===
On August 1593 (the 26th year of King Seonjo's reign), the establishment of the Military Training Agency was solidified. Initially, the Military Training Agency was established as a temporary facility rather than an official military camp. The artillery unit, which mainly used cannons, was the first to be formed, followed by the inclusion of swordsmen (salsu, 殺手) and skilled archers (sasu, 射手). King Seonjo installed the Military Training Institute to discuss and train methods of archery, artillery, and martial arts. The training methods of the Military Training Institute were based on the three techniques (san-su gihap, 三手技法) of artillery (po-beop, 砲法), archery (sa-beop, 射法), and swordsmanship (gam-beop, 砍法) described in the military manual "Gihyo Sinseo" (紀效新書) by Cheok Gye-gwang (戚繼光). Recognizing the effectiveness of firearms (hwagi, 火器) during the Battle of Pyongyang Castle, Joseon made efforts in the production and operation of firearms and sought suitable military tactics accordingly.

On September 1593 as a single military camp when King Seonjo and Yu Sŏngnyong established the Military Training Agency (Hunlyeondogam, 훈련도감, alternately translated as Military Training Command). The agency carefully divided the army into units and companies. The companies had archers, arquebusiers, sworders, and spear infantry squads. The agency set up army divisions in each region of Korea and garrisoned battalions at castles. The upper-class citizens and enslaved people were subject to the draft. All males had to enter military service to be trained and familiarized with weapons. It was also around this time that the military scholar Han Gyo (한교) wrote the martial arts manual Muyejebo, based on the book Jixiao Xinshu by the famous Chinese General Qi Jiguang. The agency initially had less than 80 troops and soon grew to about 10,000.

After 1594 (the 27th year of King Seonjo's reign), the three-technique soldier (samsu byeong, 三手兵) system could be established. The organization of the Military Training Institute consisted of the Dojejo (都提調), who concurrently held the position of Uijeong (議政), the Chief Military Administrator (byeongjopanseo, 兵曹判書), and Hojopanseo (戶曹判書), as the central figures. It also included one Chief General, one Middle General, two Star Generals, two Chonchong (천총), three Gukbyuljang (국별장), six Pachong (파총), six Jongsagwan (종사관), and thirty-four Chogwan (초관) to form the command structure.

These soldiers of the Military Training Institute, known as "gyepryobyeong" (給料兵), were employed and served not only as the king's guards but also as defenders of the capital and the frontiers, thus becoming the core of the five military camps.

==== Office of Martial Arts Guards ====
The Office of Martial Arts Guards (무예청 (武藝廳)) was a division of the Military Training Agency, who served as guards for King Seonjo during the Imjin War. It was an organization composed of skilled martial artists who were responsible for guarding the five grand palaces and providing close protection to the king. The officers belonging to the office were specially referred to as Martial Arts Special Guards (무예별감) or simply Martial Guards ("무감", 武監). It was also known as the military officials (mugwan (무관 (武官)).

The establishment process of the Office of Martial Arts Guards is detailed in King Sunjo of Joseon's work called Pure Study Records (순제고). The Office of Martial Arts Guards selected exceptional individuals with outstanding martial arts skills from the military training center (훈련도감).

=== Royal Guard Command ===
During the reign of King Injo, the Royal Guard Command (Eoyeongcheong, 어영청) was established. Injo, who ascended to the throne in 1623 through the Injo Restoration, had to devise measures against the pressure from the Later Jin Dynasty (Houjin, 후금). Therefore, in 1624 (the 2nd year of Injo's reign), Yi Gwi (이귀) was appointed as the Royal Guard Commander (Eoyeongsa, 어영사) to protect the king, marking the beginning of the Royal Guard Army (Eoyeonggun, 어영군). After the rebellion led by Yi Gwal (이괄), the Royal Guard Army began to settle as the central army responsible for both the capital's defense and the protection of the king, along with the Training Command. The Royal Guards Command had 260 artillery troops to defend the city walls of Hanseong and suppress rebellions. It grew to 7,000 troops after the Qing invasion, and during Hyojong's reign, 21,000 troops. The Royal Guard Office was organized into five divisions (부, bu), separate three bureaus (별삼사, byeolsamsa), and separate central outposts (별중초, byeoljungcho). However, during the reign of King Sukjong, it was restructured into five divisions (부, bu), 25 bureaus (사, sa), and 125 outposts (초, cho) along with the Geumwi Camp.

=== Command of the Northern Approaches ===
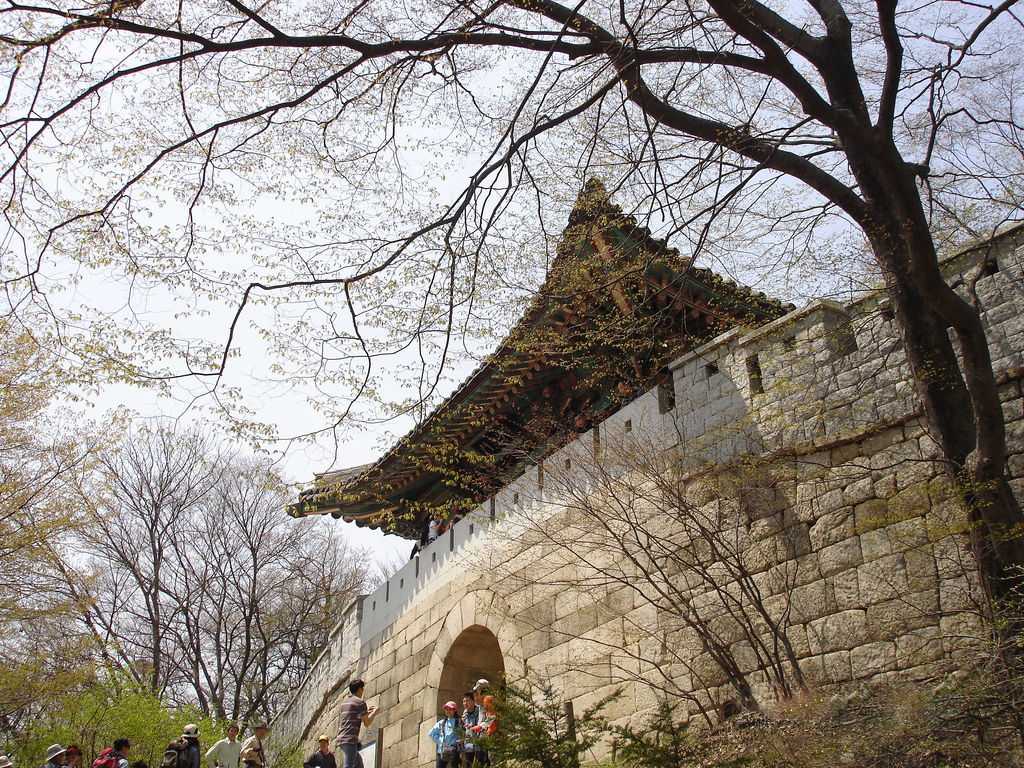
Daesumgmun of Bukhansan (Mt. Bukhan), located on the north side of Seoul, South Korea.

The Command of the Northern Approaches defended the northern outskirts of Hanseong through the Bukhansanseong Fortress with 23,500 soldiers. First, Chongyungcheong was established in 1624 (the 2nd year of King Injo's reign) due to the need for defense in the outskirts of the capital following the rebellion led by Yi Gwal during the Injo Restoration. When Chongyungcheong was initially established, a military camp was set up in Bukiyeong (North Second Camp) in Sajik-dong. However, in 1669 (the 10th year of King Hyunjong's reign), it was relocated to Samcheong-dong and in 1747 (the 23rd year of King Yeongjo's reign), it was further moved to Yeonyungdae to manage Bukhansanseong, taking charge of the defense of the northern outskirts of the capital in Gyeonggi Province.

=== Royal Defence Command ===
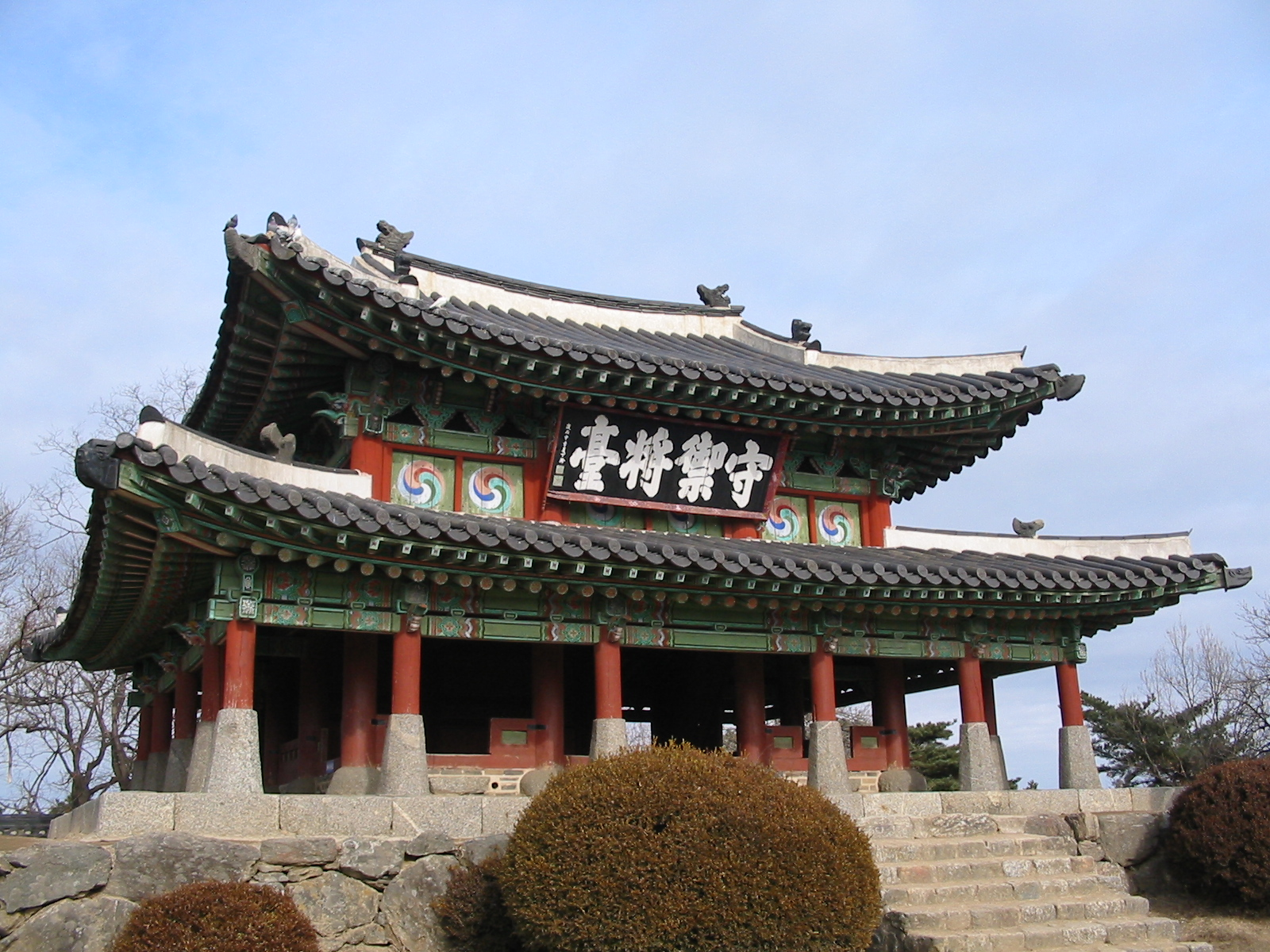
Sueojangdae, the command post of Namhansanseong, the headquarters of the Royal Defense Command.

The Royal Defence Command was established in 1626 (the 4th year of King Injo's reign) for the defense of Namhansanseong. The Royal Defense Command defended the south of Hanseong through Namhanseong Fortress with 16,500 troops. The military camp system was established in 1656 (the 7th year of King Hyojong's reign) when the Soyeong system, which was responsible for the defense and management of the fortress, was introduced for the first time. The defense of Namhansanseong against external invasions from both the north and the south was not limited to the military forces around Gyeonggi Province, but also included the military forces of the local districts along the enemy's invasion routes, incorporating them into the Soyeong system to focus on the defense of the fortress. Suocheong established its headquarters, Gyeongcheong (Capital Office), in Jinjangbang, the northern part of Hansungbu. The commander, Suosa (Defender), concurrently held the position of Hansungbuyun (Governor of Hansungbu). However, in 1795 (the 19th year of King Jeongjo's reign), King Jeongjo reorganized the organization of Suocheong. The Gyeongcheong was abolished, and the headquarters was moved to Namhansanseong, elevating the position of Gwangjubuyun (Governor of Gwangju) to Gwangjuyusu (Resident of Gwangju) and concurrently holding the position of Suosa.

=== Capital Garrison ===
Sukjeong established the Capital Garrison (Geumwiyeong) to defend Hanyang and escort the king with 85,000 soldiers. Among them are 30,000 professional soldiers based on the military elements from the other four military camps. The Geumwi Camp was established in March 1682 (the 8th year of King Sukjong's reign). Kim Seok-ju (김석주), who concurrently served as the Chief Training Command Officer (Hunryeondojang, 훈련도감 대장), proposed the reorganization of the military system, combining separate units (훈련별대, Hunryeongbyeoldae) and elite troops (정초군, Jeongchogun) to create an independent military camp called Geumwi Camp. It was reassigned as an independent army by King Yeongjo. The Geumwi Camp, also known as "Shinyeong," had its main camp located outside Changdeokgung Palace's Geumho Gate (金虎門) in the central Jungseonbang. The camp was also referred to as "Shinyeong" (新營). As for its subordinate camps, the Nambyeol Camp (South Separate Camp) was established in Naksanbang, southern Nakseondong, along with Namchang (South Warehouse) and Hanamchang (Lower South Warehouse) in the vicinity. The Seoyeong Camp (West Camp) was located across from Changdeokgung Palace's Gyeongchumun, while the Namyong Camp (South Camp) was situated above Gyeonghuigung Palace's Gaeyangmun.

== Capital Defence Standing Army ==
Capital Defense Standing Army (수도 방어 상비군)
Hanyang, Gyeonggido	Escort Office (호위청)	1,000	45,000
Hanyang, Gyeonggido	Royal Guard Command (어영청)	6,200	45,000
Hanyang, Gyeonggido	Command of the Northern Approaches (총융청)	2,000	45,000
Hanyang, Gyeonggido	Military Training Agency (훈련도감)	5,000	45,000
Hanyang, Gyeonggido	Royal Defence Command (수어청)	12,700	45,000

The Capital Defense Standing Army was a highly trained and well-equipped military force responsible for the defense of the capital city of Hanyang (modern-day Seoul) and its surrounding areas. The Capital Defense Standing Army was established in the late 16th century, during the reign of King Seonjo, and was made up of soldiers who were selected from the various military units throughout the kingdom and were trained in the latest military tactics and equipment. It was responsible for maintaining law and order in the capital city and protecting it from external threats, including invasions from foreign forces. It was tasked with enforcing the king's laws and regulations, as well as protecting the royal family and the officials. The Capital Defense Standing Army was equipped with a variety of weapons and equipment, including firearms, artillery, and fortifications. It was also responsible for maintaining an effective system of communication and intelligence gathering, which allowed it to respond quickly and effectively to potential threats. One of the key functions of the Capital Defense Standing Army was to maintain a state of readiness at all times. The soldiers were required to undergo regular training and drills to ensure that they were prepared to respond to any potential threats. They were also responsible for maintaining the fortifications and other defensive structures in and around the capital city. During times of war, the Capital Defense Standing Army played a key role in defending the capital city and its surrounding areas. It was often supplemented by other military units from throughout the kingdom, including the Escort Office, Royal Guards Command, the Command of the Northern Approaches, and the Military Training Command.

== Regional Armies ==
Both the Royal Guard Command and the Capital Garrison were organized as Regional Armies (hyanggun, (향군)), receiving salaries from the state and serving for an extended period as long-term soldiers (jangbeongun, (장번군)). They came from various regions and stationed in Seoul to guard the capital.

== Three Military Garrisons ==
The Three Military Garrisons (Samgunyeong, 삼군영; 三軍營) was a central military camp formed during the development of the capital defense system in the late Joseon Dynasty. It consists of the Military Training Agency, the Royal Guards Command, and the Capital Garrison. The soldiers of the Three Military Garrisons lived in Hanyang and played a key role in guarding the king, guarding the palace, defending the capital, and maintaining public order.

== Dissolution ==
After King Jeongjo's reign, both Royal Defense Command and Command of Northern Approaches did not function properly. The Royal Defense Command, in reality, existed in name only, while Command of Northern Approaches was incorporated into Jangyongwaiyeong (Brave and Vigorous External Camp) when it was established in 1793. These five military camps were integrated into Palace Guards Garrison (Korean: 무위영, (武衛營) and Capital Guards Garrison (Changŏyŏng, Korean: 창어영, (壯禦營)) in 1881 (the 18th year of King Gojong's reign).

However, these units were resentful towards the Special Skills Force for better treatment and equipment. Additionally, the army discharged more than 1,000 soldiers in overhauling the military; most were old or disabled. The army did not pay them in rice for thirteen months leading up to the Imo Incident, which claimed the lives of some Japanese military advisors and their legislation and some Joseon officials. Daewongun returned to power momentarily to restore order. Daewongun dismantled the Muwiyŏng, the Changŏyŏng, and the Pyŏlgigun and revived the Five-Army Camps. In December 1882, after Daewongun's arrest, the government disbanded the Five-Army Camps once more. The Chinese lines under Yuan Shikai reorganized and trained into a new Joseon military formation, the Capital Guards Command (Chingunyeong, Korean: 친군영). Later, the Command of Northern Approaches was restored after the disbandment of Jangyongyeong during King Sunjo's reign but was abolished again in 1884 (the 21st year of King Gojong's reign).

In 1894, the Office of Martial Arts Guards disbanded after the Gabo Reforms and the Eulmi Incident as part of the military reforms leading to the establishment of the Imperial Korean Armed Forces.

== See also ==
- Joseon
- Joseon Army
- 1728 Musin Rebellion
- Imjin War
- Manchu invasion of Korea

== Work Cited ==
- Keene, Donald (2002). Emperor of Japan: Meiji and His World, 1852–1912. New York: Columbia University Press. ISBN 0-231-12341-8.
- Kim, Jinwung (2012). A History of Korea: From "Land of the Morning Calm" to States in Conflict. Indiana University Press. ISBN 0-253-00024-6.
- Sin, Hyong-sik (2005). A Brief History of Korea. The Spirit of Korean Cultural Roots. Vol. 1 (2nd ed.). Seoul: Ewha Womans University Press. ISBN 978-89-7300-619-9.
