= Royal Guard Command =

1628–1881 Korean military camp

- Coat of Arms of Joseon
- Active: 1624
- Disbanded: 1881
- Country: (Korea) Joseon
- Allegiance: (Korea) King of Joseon
- Branch: Joseon Army
- Type: Royal guard
- Role: Bodyguard; Charge; Force protection Frontal assault Hand-to-hand combat Public duties Raiding; Reconnaissance; Screening
- Size: 21,000
- Part of: Five Army Camps
- Garrison/HQ: Hanyang

Insignia
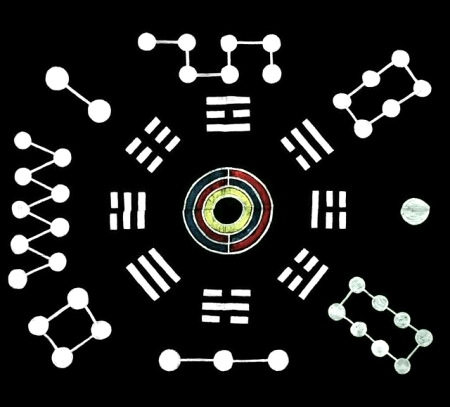
- Ensign

The Royal Guard Command (Korean: 어영청) was a military camp of the Five Army Camps established in the central region of late Joseon Korea, which served as the royal guard for the king. After the Injo Coup, King Injo of Joseon who advocated a hardline policy against the Later Jin (formerly known as the Houjin), selected and trained the Hwapogun (화포군, artillery troops) as part of his plan to personally conquer the Later Jin. This force remained as the king's guard unit and developed into the Royal Guard Command. Along with the Military Training Agency responsible for the defense of the capital, it became the core of the central army. Following the Jeongmyo and Byeongjahoran invasions, the Royal Guard Command established a large-scale and systematic military camp system centered around the Royal Guard General (Eoyongdaejang, (어영대장).

== Background ==
In 1592 (the 25th year of King Seonjo's reign), when a Japanese army of about 200,000 invaded Joseon, the central military system ranked fifth in the early Joseon period and the regional defense system of jingwan (鎭管) and jeseungbangnyak (制勝方略) failed to fulfill their roles. Therefore, the royal court raised the need for a new military organization and expedited the reorganization of the military system to overcome the war.

The organization of the new military institution played a significant role in the Ming Dynasty's military tactics. During the Imjin War, when 40,000 Ming soldiers came to assist Joseon, General Nak Sang-ji (駱尙志) of the Ming Dynasty mentioned the importance of military training to Yu Sŏngnyong. Upon receiving the permission of King Seonjo, Liu Sung-ryong trained Nak Sang-ji in military tactics, including the use of weapons such as gongbang (棍棒), deungpae (籐牌), nangseon (狼筅), jangchang (長鎗), dangpa (鐺鈀), and ssangsudo (雙手刀).

== Establishment ==
The Royal Guard Command was established In response to the turbulent domestic situation caused by the Injo Coup of 1623 and increasing pressure from the Later Jin Dynasty. King Injo took a hard line against the later kings. Particularly, the Seoin faction of the Injo administration, unlike during the reign of King Gwanghae, advocated a strong policy towards the Later Jin and recognized the need for countermeasures. In such a situation, rather than waiting for the Later Jin's invasion, the Seoin faction actively planned a military expedition against them. To implement this plan, King Injo himself would go to Gaeseong as the expedition's leader. Lee Gwi (李貴), a prominent figure in Gaeseong, was appointed as Eoyungsa (御戎使) and had him select and train about 260 fire artillery troops. The defense of the capital city would be entrusted to Han Jun-geon, a high-ranking officer, while Lee Gui would be appointed as the resident commander and the commander of the Royal Guard in Kaesong. The appointment of officers to prepare for a potential Later Jin invasion became the pioneering measure for the establishment of Eoyeongcheong. But due to the delay in the King's departure, Lee Gui stepped down from his position and returned to civilian life. King Injo’s plan for his own home was not put into action. However, the soldiers recruited by Lee Gwi were not disbanded, and Lee Gwi, who had retired from Gaeseong exile in the first month of 1624 (the 2nd year of King Injo's reign), was assigned to guard the king as Eoyongsa (御營使). The establishment and operation of Royal Guard Command can be seen as significant due to the movement to identify and improve the problems within the Training Department and implement new military reforms.

Eoyeonggun (the Royal Army) soon emerged to provide protection when King Injo sought refuge in Gongju during the rebellion led by Yi Gwal. The number of soldiers in Eoyeonggun increased when the rebellion was suppressed and King Injo returned to Hwando. However, instead of disbanding them, they were divided into groups taking turns guarding the king. Thus, Eoyeonggun began to establish itself as the central military force responsible not only for defending the capital but also for protecting the royal authority. At one point, Eoyeonggun was also part of the Chongyungsa, but its numbers increased during the Jeongmyo turmoil. In December of the 6th year of King Injo's reign (1628), a command structure was established with Jejo and Daejang as its pinnacle, and after the Qing invasion of Joseon, the number of soldiers again increased effectively establishing an army camp system. It was further expanded and consolidated during the reign of King Hyojong. Although it was influenced by the political circumstances of factional politics, it resembled the Five Guards system established in the early days of the country.

== Organization ==
During the reign of King Injo, the Royal Guard Command (Eoyeongcheong, 어영청) was established. Injo, who ascended to the throne in 1623 through the Injo Coup, had to devise measures against the pressure from the Later Jin Dynasty (Houjin, 후금). Therefore, in 1624 (the 2nd year of Injo's reign), Yi Gwi (이귀) was appointed as the Royal Guard Commander (Eoyeongsa, 어영사) to protect the king, marking the beginning of the Royal Guard Army (Eoyeonggun, 어영군). To strengthen the king's protection there, seven skilled soldiers were selected from nearby mountainous regions for large towns, four for medium-sized towns, and two for small towns. After Yi Gwal's Rebellion (이괄), the Royal Guard Army began to settle as the central army responsible for both the capital's defense and the protection of the king, along with the Military Training Agency.

Amidst the chaotic domestic situation caused by the Imjin War and the deteriorating relationship with the Later Jin Dynasty on the international stage in 1623, the U'yeong Corps was established. King Injo, who advocated a strong policy towards the Jurchens, prepared for an expedition to Gaeseong under the plan of Chinjaengju. As part of this plan, Yi Gwi selected and trained around 260 Hwabogun (firearm troops). This marked the beginning of the Royal Guard Command. However, King Injo's expedition plan was not carried out. Nevertheless, the troops recruited by Yi Gwi were not disbanded, and when Yi Gwi retired from Gaeseong in the first month of 1624 (King Injo's 2nd year), he continued to lead them as the Royal Guard Command, escorting the king.

=== Structure ===
The basic military command structure, included two Langdang officials in charge of military affairs, in addition to the fundamental military command system. There were also 12 Kyo-nyeom officials responsible for military training, such as the Kyo-nyeom officials and 10 Flag officers, as well as 15 headquarters officers, 11 officers from the Chulsin, 52 officers from the Gwajeonbyeong, 30 separate warriors, 1 horse doctor, and 300 Jae-gyeong officers. Among them, some were established as needed, but like the training headquarters, there were also concerns about the excessive promotion of non-military officials, which can be seen as a concern of the Joseon Dynasty.

The main camp of Eo-yeongcheong was located east of Namseo Myeongjeokbong's Nammun Gate, and as its scale expanded, Shinwon was established in Iryeon, Dongwon was installed outside Seoninmun Gate, but when the king was in Gyeonghuigung Palace, it was stationed outside Kaiyangmun Gate. In addition, North Second Camp was located in Saejik-dong, but when the king was in Gyeonghuigung Palace, it was stationed outside Mudeomun Gate. In addition, Jipchun Camp was located outside Jipchunmun Gate, and the South Granary, which stored provisions, was located in Namsodong.

=== Division ===
Immediately after its establishment, the Royal Guard Command pledged allegiance to Princess Bacheonju during Yi Gwal's Rebellion. They recruited artillerymen from various regions and expanded to about 600 soldiers, and after the Hwanhwa Campaign, the number increased to around 1,000. Thus, the Royal Guard Command became responsible for the defense of the capital as well as the core of the central army, along with the Hwando Garrison, which was responsible for the defense of the capital. However, due to financial difficulties, they could not be stationed in Seoul like the Hwando Garrison. Instead, they were divided into units of 500 soldiers, who took turns being stationed and provided with Boins (support personnel) to cover their expenses. The Royal Guard Command was temporarily under the command of the Chongnongsa (Commander-in-Chief), but in December 1628, immediately after the Jingbi War, their number increased to 5,000, and they became a separate unit as a Chong (headquarters), with the Royal Guard General (Commander of the Royal Guard Command) at its pinnacle, establishing a military system.

The Royal Guards Command had 260 artillery troops to defend the city walls of Hanseong and suppress rebellions. After the Qing invasion of Joseon, their number increased to about 7,000 and they were divided into eight units. The Royal Guard Command was organized into five divisions (부, bu), separate three bureaus (별삼사, byeolsamsa), and separate central outposts (별중초, byeoljungcho). In terms of military organization, in addition to the basic troops of each province, including Gakdo Hyanggun with 125 seconds, there were 150 knights, 160 Byulpa-jin (with 10 members each taking turns as Huapo-gun), and various other famous and unknown troops such as Gyeongbyeongha-gun with 981 members, Sumungun with 40 members, Gunpuchujeok-gun with 16 members, Bonya soldiers with 310 members, Geonryugoya soldiers with 87 members, Tijungbomagun with 50 members, Yanghwa Jinha soldiers with 100 members, 10 instructors, 40 combined pajeon, 700 local knights, and 56 Gyeongbyeong soldiers. There were also various troops, including those who received 9 dou of rice like Pyohagun and Sumungun and worked as Changban guards, as well as the Tijungbomagun, which only worked when necessary, and the Hyanggisa, who were supposed to be Sufo-gun. In a sense, it can be said that it was a military camp form that was centered around the 6th province Hyanggun and included rotational soldiers and salaried soldiers who performed rotational duties.

==== Hyojong ====
Subsequently, during the reign of King Hyojong, as part of the Northern Expedition plan, the U'yeong Corps was significantly expanded. In 1652 (King Hyojong's 3rd year), Hyojong appointed military specialist Yi Hwan as the U'yeongdaejang and sought to enhance the strength of the U'yeong Corps as one of the primary projects for military expansion into a year-round military camp. As a result, the number was increased to 21,000, more than triple the previous size. Instead, 21 groups of 1,000 troops were stationed at the military headquarters. However, after King Hyojong's reign, it became difficult to maintain the operational system due to financial constraints. The recruitment-based system was changed to a compulsory system where the Hyanggun (local defense forces) from the six provinces, excluding Pyeongan and Hamgyeong, were obliged to carry out rotations. This change led to a significant increase in the number of Boins supporting the U'yeong Corps. However, after King Hyojong, the enthusiasm for northern expeditions waned, and the power struggle between factions intensified, complicating the change of government. This increased the burden of maintaining Eoyeongcheong, ultimately leading to a change in the guard system to the rotational system of the local militias (Xiangjun) in the six provinces, excluding Pyeongan and Hamgyeong. During King Hyojong's reign, Eoyeongcheong was organized with five departments, three separate offices, and one separate central outpost. Additionally, separate cavalry units called Bomyeongdwi and artillery units called Beopajeon were established within Eoyeongcheong.

==== Sukjong ====
The Royal Guard Command was initially organized into 5 Bu (部, divisions), Byul Samsa (別三司, separate three offices), and Byul Jungcho (別中哨, separate central posts) according to the Sok'o Law (束伍法). Then, in December 1704 (King Sukjong's 30th year), it was reorganized into 1 Yeong (營, battalion) consisting of 5 Bu, 1 Bu consisting of 5 Sa (司, offices), and 1 Sa consisting of 5 Cho (哨, posts), totaling 125 Cho with a total strength of 16,300 personnel. Furthermore, the basic unit of the Sok'o Law, which is the Cho's military organization (軍摠), was composed of 127 personnel (1 Cho = 3 Gi, 1 Gi = 3 Dae, 1 Dae = 10 Jeonggun, 1 Hwabyeong, and 1 Bokmagun). These Hyanggun (향군) soldiers were divided into 25 rotations, with 5 Cho serving in rotation for two months, resulting in approximately 700 soldiers stationed in Seoul. In addition to the basic troops, which were the Hyanggun, there were 150 Knights (기사), 160 Byulpajin (別破陣, special assault troops), various Kyungpyoha-gun (경표하군, soldiers responsible for guarding the capital) numbering 781, 40 Sumungun (守門軍, gatekeepers), 16 Gunposujik (軍鋪守直, military storekeepers), 301 Bonabyeong (本牙兵, palace guards), 87 Hyeonrokabyeong (懸錄牙兵, elite guards), 50 Chijungbokmagun (輜重卜馬軍, logistics and transport troops), 100 Yanghwajinabyeong (楊花津牙兵, special task force), 9 Kyosa (敎師, instructors), 40 Gyeombulpajin (兼別破陣, dual-purpose assault troops), 700 Hyangkisa (鄕騎士, local knights), and 56 Pyohagun (標下軍, troops responsible for flags). There were various types of miscellaneous troops in addition to the Hyanggun, some of which were deployed for special occasions such as Pyohagun or Sumungun, while others, such as Chijungbokmagun, only served when necessary, and Hyangkisa, which had the name but were actually Sumugun. To maintain the U'yeong Army, the Bop (保) was established, consisting of 17,475 Jabo (資保, reserve) personnel, 51,750 Gwanbo (官保, officials), 980 Byulpajinbo (special assault troops reserve), and 3,729 Kisabo (기사보, knights reserve), totaling 72,359 personnel, which was nearly four times the size of the Hyanggun. Military personnel in the U'yeong Army were appointed as Suryeong (수령, military leaders) capable of martial arts training in each region, serving as Gyeompachong (兼把摠, dual-commanders) in charge of their training.

However, when the Geumwiyeong was established during King Sukjong's reign, in December of the 30th year (1704), Eoyeongcheong was reorganized along with Geumwiyeong, resulting in a total of five departments, 25 companies, 125 units, and 16,300 soldiers. Each unit consisted of 127 soldiers (1 unit = 3 flags, 1 flag = 3 companies, 1 company = 12 soldiers, including 10 regular soldiers, 1 artillery soldier, and 1 Boeundae soldier). With this reorganization, Eoyeongcheong divided the 125 units into 25 groups, with each group consisting of five units. They rotated every two months, ensuring that approximately 700 soldiers were stationed in the capital at all times. The restructuring of Eoyeongcheong aimed not only to establish uniformity with the Geumwiyeong, which was organized as a unified Xiangjun, but also to strengthen the defense of the capital by maintaining a standing reserve force of around 700 soldiers in Seoul.

== Duties ==
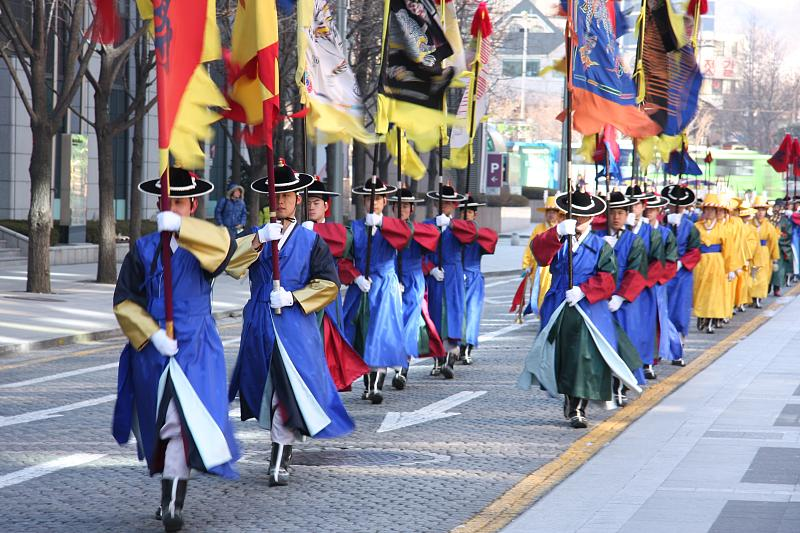
Korea-Seoul-Ceremony marching.

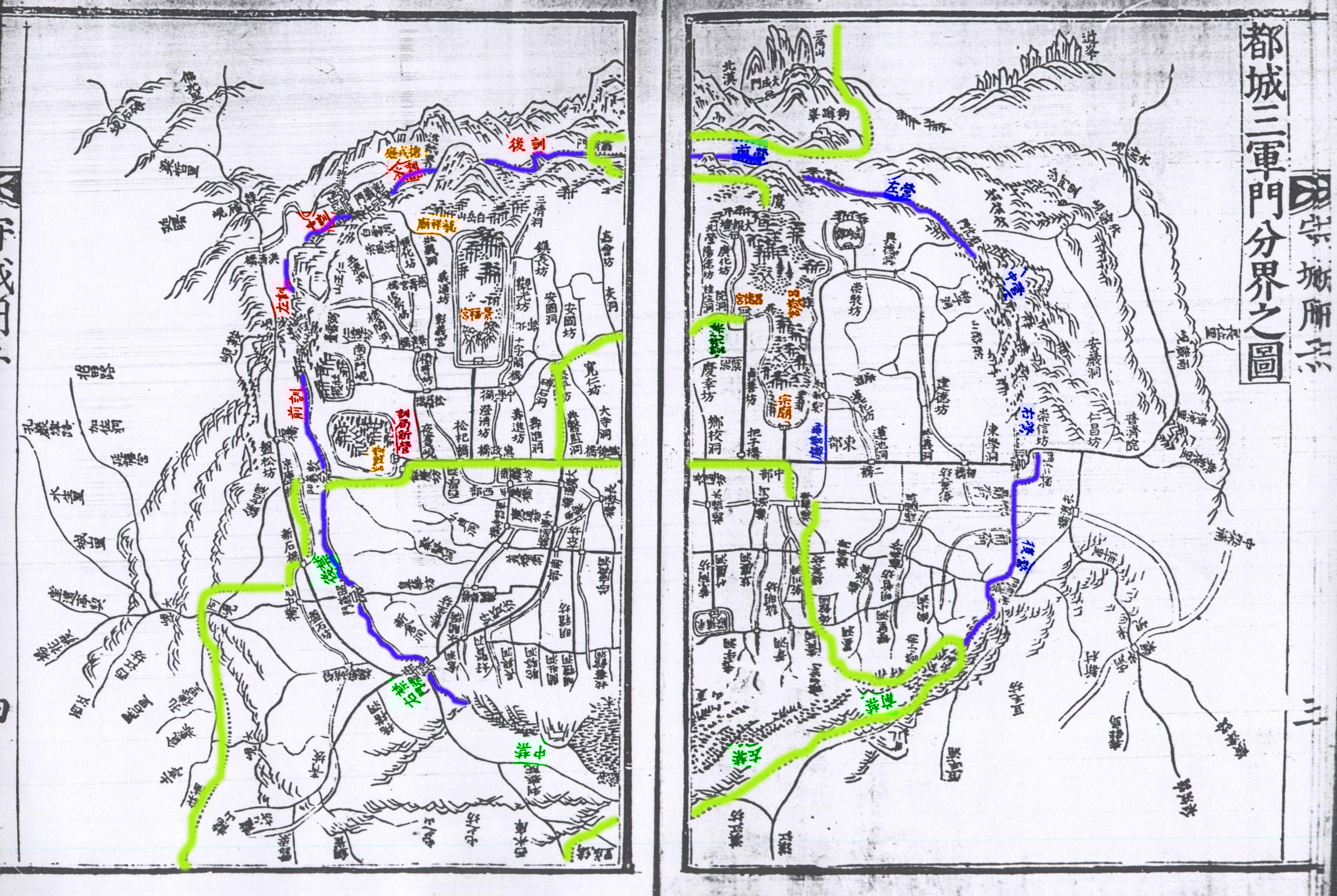
Illustration file to explain the Doseongsam-gun gate boundary map.

The Royal Guard Command's main duty is to protect the King, the palaces, and the capital city and they were divided into groups taking turns. Eoyeongcheong was a seasonal military camp that operated only from October 15 to February 15 each year, during the ice formation period when incursions by the Later Jin were a concern. During Hyojong's reign, they were divided into six units, with each unit stationed for two months to avoid the previous practice of winter-only deployments. Therefore, each guard had to serve in rotation approximately once every three and a half years.

Unlike the Training headquarters, the Royal Guard Command had 11 and 10 officials respectively. While the Do-gam soldiers were Changban guards, these two camps rotated duty every four years, so there were concerns about military training after the rotation. Therefore, in each province, two Wu officials with martial arts abilities were assigned to double as Pachong officials, responsible for the training of the local Hyanggun soldiers within their respective jurisdictions.

The Eo-yeongcheong had a Kan-gwan-byulbeo, which was responsible for other administrative matters established in Yongjongjin. There was one Junggun, one Pachong, one Chogwan, 160 Bongyeong-gun officers, 300 Daebyeon-gun officers, 8 Kyo-nyeom officials, 15 Flag officers, 18 Byulpa-jin, and 5 Beotae-gun officers were placed, totaling 731 people. According to the "Man-gi-yo-ran," in the 6th year of Sukjong (1680), the Yongjong Manho was appointed as the Eo-yeongcheong Pachong, but when it became an independent Jin in the 34th year of Yeongjo (1758), it is said that the Cheomsa became the Cheonchong again. The reason why Yeongjongdo belonged to Eo-yeongcheong is unknown, but it is thought to be related to the record that a defense post was placed here for the defense of the capital area in the "Seokdaedae-ryeok" and then abolished.

== Funding ==
The financial foundation of Eoyeongcheong relied on the Boeun system. Expanding and strengthening this central military force posed a significant financial burden. To address this, the government established "Boman" for them. If they were of good character, they were assigned one "Boman," and if they were of lower status, they were granted the benefit of exemption from corvée labor. The soldiers serving in the rotating guard duty of Eoyeongcheong were given three Boeun each. One Boeun was solely allocated for the expenses incurred during guard duty (資保), while the other two Boeun were used to cover the expenses during their stay in Seoul, resulting in a total of 80,000 Boeun for the soldiers at that time.

Furthermore, the Xiangjun themselves, which constituted the mainstream of Geumwiyeong, were maintained by the local militias in the six provinces and brought benefits to the national finances. Looking at the number of Boeun assigned to the Geumwiyeong soldiers at that time, 17,475 were allocated to civilian officials (資保), 50,175 to government officials (官保), 780 to Beopajeon soldiers (別破陣保), and 3,729 to cavalry soldiers (騎士保), totaling 67,650. This means that the number of Boeun allocated to the Xiangjun soldiers was about four times that of the Geumbok soldiers. As a result, each infantry soldier received one Boeun, and each Boeundae soldier received two Boeun to cover their equipment needs. The government allocated a significantly higher number of Boeun to government officials, providing 1 liang of travel funds (旅需錢) and 9 du of monthly provisions for each soldier (increased to 3 du for those serving as auxiliary servants). While this large number of Boeun didn't impose a significant burden on the national finances, it relatively increased the burden of corvée labor. This led to continuous issues regarding the conscription system.

U'yeongcheong operated under a system called "Bangsang gyulryeojae" (번상급료제), which provided soldiers with compensation in the form of 9 dou (斗) of rice per month in exchange for one rotation of duty. For each regular soldier (Jeonggun, 정군), one person was assigned as a "Jabo" (자보) who was responsible for supplying cloth. The Jabo, similar to the conscription system in early Joseon, provided military uniforms and covered the expenses of soldiers' rotation duty, while the regular soldiers were assigned to agricultural work during their rotation period. Additionally, for each regular soldier, two "Gwanbo" (관보) were assigned, and they paid military service taxes to U'yeongcheong, which constituted a source of revenue for compensation. The Gwanbo system was designed to address the issue of regular soldiers being unable to fulfill their military duty due to the escape of their assigned Bo-in (보인, person responsible for supplying cloth). With this system, U'yeong soldiers received compensation from the military camp while being able to serve their rotation duties at U'yeongcheong.

== Dissolution ==
While operating U'yeongcheong, a problem arose with the overall increase in the burden of military service (Yeokchong, 역총). As U'yeongcheong soldiers performed their rotation duty, King Sukjong (reigned 1674-1720) reduced the size of the regular army to less than 16,000 soldiers and also decreased the number of Bo-in and other military personnel. However, due to difficulties in the national finances, discussions of its abolition emerged. Moreover, concerns arose that the short-term rotation of soldiers might lead to insufficient compensation, resulting in an increase in crimes within the capital. The issue of how U'yeongcheong soldiers were treated was also connected to the problem of military weakening.

It merged with the Chongyungcheong (총융청) and Geumwiyeong (금위영) in 1881 (King Gojong's 18th year) to become the Jangeoyeong (장어영), and then changed to Chong'oyeong (총어영) in 1884, before being abolished in 1894.

== See also ==
- Joseon Army
- Five Army Camps
- Military Training Agency
