= Yi Kwal's Rebellion =

1624 rebellion in Joseon Korea

Date	January 22 – February 15, 1624
Location	Northern Korean Peninsula, Hanseong
Result	Government Victory: Rebellion suppressed

Belligerents
Joseon Army	Yi Kwal's Rebel Army

Commanders and leaders
King Injo; Chang Man; Chŏng Ch'ungsin; Nam Ihŭng	Yi Kwal X Han Myŏngnyŏn X Ki Ikhŏn

Strength
30,000: 600 Eoyeongcheong	12,000: 100 Hang-wae

Casualties and losses
Over 10,000 casualties	Annihilation

- Yi Kwal's Rebellion
- Hangul: 이괄의 난
- Hanja: 李适의 亂
- RR: I Gwarui nan
- MR: I Kwarŭi nan

Yi Kwal's Rebellion (Korean: 이괄의 난; Hanja: 李适의 亂) was an armed rebellion in the Joseon dynasty led by General Yi Kwal, who helped Injo ascend to the throne and incited a rebellion against him for being rewarded poorly and trying to arrest his son. He led 12,000 of his soldiers to occupy Hanseong and replace him with Heungangun, his royal relative as king. But the Joseon army led by General Chang Man retook the capital and crushed the rebellion, preserving King Injo's rule.

Yi Kwal was subsequently executed by his own army. Yi Kwal's Rebellion weakened the Korean military, making them vulnerable to the Later Jin's invasion.

== Background ==
Since the establishment of a Confucian dynasty by King Taejo, there had been political disputes between the parties in the government. Some disputes even resulted in bloodshed, like the one which occurred in the time of the king Yeonsangun. Also, during the time of King Seonjo just before the Japanese invasions of Korea, the political parties had been divided between the Easterners and the Westerners. The Easterners gradually split up into two separate factions called the Northerners and the Southerners.

== Prelude ==
On April 11, 1623, the Westerners deposed Gwanghaegun in a coup. The coup directed by Kim Yu took place at night. Gwanghaegun fled but was captured later. The Western faction installed Neungyanggun as the sixteenth king Injo. Injo rewarded the major coup leaders with positions in the king's court.

In January 1624, Injo sent Yi Kwal to the Northern front as deputy commander of Yongbyon, Pyongyang, Pyongan Province, to fight against the expanding Jin dynasty. Yi Kwal also knew the importance of the new mission and was faithful to his duties, such as military training, maintenance of the castle wall, and strengthening the security of the camp.

The Westerners, recently dissatisfied with the success of Yi Kwal (who was part of the Northerners), petitioned the king stating that Yi Kwal and some members of the Northerners were planning a rebellion. Injo examined the petition as the ministers had a close relationship with the king. However, the reports proved false, and the Western Party failed to condemn Yi Kwal. The investigation made Yi Kwal feel like he was treated unfairly for his part in the Injo Coup. They tried again soon after, which provoked the suspicion of the king. However, Injo ignored the discussion about Yi Kwal but sent an examination and arrest party to Yongbyon to arrest Yi Kwal's son Yi Chŏn and bring him to Hanyang. Yi Kwal suspected he would be condemned if his son confessed, he decided on a pre-emptive strike. Finally, he killed the arrest party, and the rebellion officially began on January 22, 1624.

== Rebellion ==
Yi Kwal rescued Han Myŏngnyŏn in the middle of the road, who was being transported to Seoul on charges of conspiracy, and joined the rebellion. Myŏngnyŏn was a skilled operative, and from then on, the two formed a close relationship with each other and took command of the rebels. On January 22, Yi Kwal left Yongbyon with about 100 Hang-wae soldiers (Japanese who defected to Joseon during Japanese invasions of Korea) as his vanguard and 10,000 troops under his command. He evaded Pyongyang, where Do Won-su and Jang-man were stationed, and marched straight toward Seoul by a side road. At that time, Chang Man obtained information about Yi Kwal's rebellion, but his troops were only a few thousand, and he could not afford to fight head-on with Yi Kwal's elite army. The rebels of Yi Kwal went through Gaecheon and Jasan, were stationed in Sinchang, Gangdong, on the 26th, and changed their course to Sangwon on the 28th.

The first clash with the government troops happened in the Hamgyong province, where the government troops were being led by his close friends, Chŏng Ch'ungsin and Nam Ihong. He tried to avoid these two generals and surpassed their troops. Yi Kwal first engaged the government forces at Shingyo in Hwangju and captured and killed the general, Pak Yŏngsŏ, and his officers. Yi Kwal's march was so fast that, in many cases, the military could not confirm his whereabouts. During the march to the capital, Yi Kwal defeated a regular army under the command of General Chang Man. Yi Kwal then passed Gaeseong and surprise attacked the government forces guarding the Imjin river and defeated them. Injo protected by the Royal Guards Command (Eoyeongcheong), fled to Gongju, and Hanseong fell into the hands of the rebels on February 10, making it the first time a rebel army had captured the capital since the establishment of the Joseon dynasty.

On the 11th day, 2nd month of 1624, Yi Kwal enthroned Prince Heungan (흥안군; 興安君), son of King Seongjo, as king and set up guards in Hanyang. At the same time, they established a new administrative system. Moreover, he put fliers all over the city so the people would support his troops. However, the rebel occupation of the capital did not last long. Hanseong was soon threatened by General Chang Man and other generals from the government forces and the provincial armies. General Chang Man returned with another regiment and reached the suburbs of Hanyang. After deliberation, they encamped at Gilmajae, which is advantageous in terms of topography. The next day, Yi Kwal learned of this movement and sent Han Myŏngnyŏn to combat the enemy, he divided his army into two to surround and attack the government forces, but they lost the battle due to their inferior geographical position. As a result, Yi Kwal and Han Myŏngnyŏn evacuated the capital with hundreds of rebels, escaped to Sugumun Gate, and fled to Gwangju via Samjeondo under cover of night. The Central Army recaptured the capital soon after. In pursuit of the government forces, the Yi Kwal ordered the rebel army to scatter. On the night of February 15, when they reached Mukbang-ri in Icheon, Yi Kwal and Han Myŏngnyŏn were murdered by their troops and generals led by Ki Ikhŏn, who were seeking forgiveness from the government, therefore, ending the rebellion.

== Aftermath ==
News of Yi Kwal's death and others reached the residence of Gongju, and Injo returned on February 22. After Injo returned to Korea, he rewarded 32 people, including Chang Man, Chŏng Ch'ungsin, and Nam Ihŭng, who contributed to the rebellion of Yi Kwal as Chinmu Kongsin (振武功臣), and prepared a plan to rectify the rebellion. However, Yi Kwal's rebellion considerably impacted the domestic and international situation at the time. On the inside, it was the first time the king had left Seoul due to a domestic rebellion, and it shocked the ruling class and the general public.

After the rebellion, Injo established two military camps, the Command of the Northern Approaches (Chongyungcheong), and the Royal Defense Command (Sueocheong). The Royal Guards Command had 260 artillery troops to defend the city walls of Hanseong and suppress rebellions. It grew to 7,000 troops after the Qing invasion, and during Hyojong's reign, 21,000 troops. The Command of the Northern Approaches defended the northern outskirts of Hanseong through the Bukhansanseong Fortress with 23,500 soldiers. The Royal Defense Command defended to defend south of Hanseong through Namhanseong Fortress with 16,500 troops.

Even though Injo was able to keep his throne, Joseon society effectively entered a period of chaos, and the rebellion displayed the weaknesses of royal authority while asserting the superiority of the aristocrats, who had gained even more power by fighting against the rebellion. Public sentiment was not stable for a long time due to the strengthening of temples by the ruling class. When the rebellion failed, Han Myŏngnyŏn's son Yun and others fled to the Jin dynasty, announcing the unstable situation in the country and encouraging them to invade the south, which provoked and facilitated the First Manchu invasion of Korea in 1627. The economy, which was experiencing a slight recovery from Gwanghaegun's reconstruction, was again ruined, and Korea would remain in a poor economic state for a few centuries.

== See also ==
- Yi Kwal
- Injo of Joseon
- Later Jin invasion of Joseon
