= Military Training Agency =

1596–1884 Korean military organization

- Coat of Arms of Joseon
- Active: 1596
- Disbanded: 1884
- Country: (Korea) Joseon
- Allegiance: (Korea) King of Joseon
- Branch: Joseon Army
- Type: Capital Army
- Role: Military education and training
- Size: 10,000
- Part of: Five Army Camps
- Garrison/HQ: Hanyang

Insignia
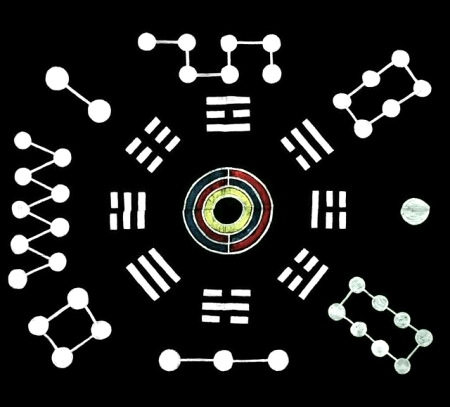
- Ensign

Korean name
- Hangul: 훈련도감
- Hanja: 訓鍊都監
- RR: Hullyeondogam
- MR: Hullyŏndogam

The Military Training Agency (Korean: 훈련도감; Hanja: 訓鍊都監), alternately translated as Military Training Command was founded in 1593, when the Imjin War of 1592–1598 was in progress. As the Joseon Army was struggling against the Japanese army's muskets, a new army was created as a countermeasure. It aimed to organize and train an elite force by instituting a system of providing salaries to all soldiers. It was the only military camp among the five major military camps that provided salaries to all its troops. However, due to the deterioration of the national finances, discussions about its abolition were often held. The Training Headquarters became the core military camp, along with the Geumwi Camp (금위영), the Eoyeongcheong Camp (어영청), and together they were called the Samgunmun (삼군문, 三軍門), the three main military camps of the central government, responsible for protecting the king and defending the capital.

== Background ==
Originally, the military system in Joseon was the Yangin Gaebyeongje (양인개병제), where all able-bodied men became soldiers. They worked in agriculture during the summer and trained for defense in the winter. Joseon divided these Yangin soldiers into five guards called Owi (오위, 五衛) and utilized them as soldiers. However, as time went by, instead of receiving military training, the Yangin soldiers started paying money to avoid military service, and by the end of the 16th century, the actual military force was almost non-existent. During the early Joseon period, the protection of the king was carried out by the Naegeumwi (금군인 내금위), Gyeomsabok (겸사복), and Urimwi (우림위).

In this situation, in 1592 (King Seonjo's 25th year), Joseon faced the Japanese invasions (Imjin War), and King Seonjo had to rely on the Ming Dynasty and flee to Uiju (의주). As the number of Royal Guards decreased in the 16th century, the Training Command was established during the Imjin War, and its members became elite soldiers who received salaries and were entrusted with the task of protecting the king. Eventually, to overcome the war, a new military camp was established, and that was the Military Training Agency (훈련도감). The Training Command was also known as "Yeonhachinbyeong" (연하친병), which means a unit that directly guards the king under his supervision. They initially guarded the temporary residence of King Seonjo in Jeongneung-dong, and later they were stationed in the palace throughout the late Joseon period, protecting the king.

In July 1593 (King Seonjo's 26th year), they entrusted the training of Huap'o (화포, cannons) to Naksangji (낙상지), a skilled general of the Ming Dynasty, and focused on developing artillery forces (Pogun, 포군). As a result, the Training Headquarters was established in August, and a conscription system (Mobyeongje, 모병제) was implemented to operate it as a reserve army. They also acquired the book Jixiao Xinshu written by the Ming general Qi Jiguang to establish a training method based on the Samsubyeong (삼수병) system. The Samsubyeong system divided soldiers into three categories: Salsu (살수), who primarily used swords, Sashu (사수), who primarily used bows, and Posu (포수), who primarily used firearms. Among them, the Posu soldiers were the largest in number and played a major role.

== Establishment ==
The establishment of the Military Training Agency was concretized after the events following the Imjin War, when King Seonjo fled and then returned in October of the 26th year of his reign (1598). The Military Training Agency (훈련도감, 訓鍊都監) was a new central military camp established to overcome the Japanese invasions of Korea (Imjin War). When the existing military system (군제, 軍制) collapsed during the war, the Training Headquarters was established as a policy to address the situation. At that time, based on the suggestions of military commanders such as Ryu Seong-ryong, who held military command as the Three Provinces Military Inspector, the Training Manual was established with a focus on relieving the hungry and cultivating elite soldiers, providing a monthly salary of 9 dou and organizing them as specialized troops in artillery, combat, and marksmanship according to the Zhejiang Military Strategy in the military treatise Jixiao Xinshu. Therefore, the Training Manual Army was organized as a specialized unit of the Three Provinces troops, with a focus on the principles of "treating many as treating few" and emphasizing "clear responsibilities and disciplined squads" based on the fundamental spirit of Jixiao Xinshu. However, although it was organized as a specialized unit of the three types of soldiers, it was primarily organized around artillery for overcoming the Imjin War. Therefore, the Military Training Agency was initially established as artillery and later incorporated the Volunteer Corps as assassins and included gatekeepers and archers, and the organization as a three-type soldier was achieved after June of the 27th year of King Seonjo's reign.

The establishment of the Military Training Agency, as can be seen from its name as "Doe-gam," was not a legally supported military camp from the beginning. In other words, in the initial stages of its establishment, it was a temporary military camp that literally divided the national army into three types and trained them professionally to overcome the Imjin War. However, it gradually became a permanent military camp for the defense of the capital after the restoration, and there were many twists and turns in this process.

== Organization ==
In September 1593 as a single military camp when King Seonjo and Ryu Seong-Ryong established the Military Training Agency (Hunlyeondogam, 훈련도감, alternately translated as Military Training Command). At this time, the Samsubyeong (three-handed soldiers) system (soldiers using muskets, bows, swords, and spears) was formed, referring to the Jixiao Xinshu written by Qi Jiguang, a general of the Ming Dynasty who contributed to the eradication of Japanese pirates. The agency carefully divided the army into units and companies. The companies had archers, arquebusiers, sworders, and spear infantry squads. The agency set up army divisions in each region of Korea and garrisoned battalions at castles. The upper-class citizens and enslaved people were subject to the draft. All males had to enter military service to be trained and familiarized with weapons. It was also around this time that the military scholar Han Gyo (한교) wrote the martial arts manual Muyejebo, based on the Jixiao Xinshu by Qi Jiguang.

=== Headquarters ===
The headquarters of the dojang was located in Yoo-gyeong-dong, Seoul, while the "糧餉廳" (provisioning department) which supplied grains and military supplies to the dojang, was located in Namboo-hun, Hwon-tao. As the size of the dojang grew, various barracks such as "北營" (North Camp), "南營" (South Camp), "新營" (New Camp), "下都監" (Lower Metropolitan Camp), "北一營" (North First Camp), and "西營" (West Camp) were built. The North Camp was located outside Gongbeok Gate in Won-dong, the South Camp was located outside Dunhwa Gate of Changdeok Palace, the New Camp was located outside Hwagye Palace, the Lower Metropolitan Camp was located east of Hunryeonwon in Namboo Mingjeol-dong, the North First Camp was located outside Wude Gate of Gyeonghuigung Palace, and the West Camp was located outside Sungui Gate of Gyeonghuigung Palace. This arrangement of various public offices of the dojang around these palaces is believed to be due to the frequent presence of the king in Changdeok Palace or Gyeonghuigung Palace.

=== Command Structure ===
The Training Headquarters served as both a central government agency and a military camp. It was filled with numerous government officials and commanders.

In the early stages of its establishment, the Military Training Agency had a "Daejang" as the chief military officer and directly responsible for military command, and under them were the "Junggun" and "Cheonsap" who directly commanded the troops, and they were connected through the organization of "Si-Ho-Qi-Dae-Wu." However, as the organization grew and strengthened, a "Dutychong" who also served as a "Yijung" responsible for politics was added, and a "Taejang" (2nd rank) who directly assumed military responsibility was placed under the "Daejang," along with a "Junggun" (2nd rank), two "Byeongjang" (3rd rank), two "Cheonsap" (3rd rank), three "Jukbyeongjang" (3rd rank), six "Bajung" (4th rank), four "Chongsa-gwan" (6th rank), and 34 "Cheogwan" (9th rank) as commanders.

After 1594 (the 27th year of King Seonjo's reign), the three-technique soldier (samsu byeong, 三手兵) system could be established. The organization of the Military Training Institute consisted of one 1st class Dojejo (都提調), who concurrently held the position of Uijeong (議政) and was the highest-ranking position in name within the Training Agency. The Dojejo served in rotation as Samuijeong (三議政). The two Jejo positions were naturally held by the Chief Military Administrators (byeongjopanseo, 兵曹判書), and Hojopanseo (戶曹判書), were the central figures.. Although they held higher positions than the 2nd class Training Commander, the actual authority and command of the Training Headquarters were held by the Training Commander, who was responsible for all affairs of the Training Headquarters. Therefore, the Training Commander became a position of great influence. The Training Headquarters was the only standing army and had the largest number of troops, consisting of elite soldiers who constantly underwent military training. Once appointed, the Training Commander naturally held the position for a long time.

The organization also included one Chief General, two 2nd class Jejo (提調), one 2nd class Daegjang (大將), one 2nd class Middle General (Junggun (中軍)), two 3rd class special generals (Byeoljang (別將), two 3rd class Cheonchong (천총, 千摠), three 3rd class Gukbyeoljang (국별장, 局別將), six 4th class Pachong (파총, 把摠), six 6th class Jongsagwan (종사관, 從事官), and thirty-four 9th class Chogwan (초관, 哨官) (who existed separately.) to form the command structure.

In the late Joseon period, most Training Commanders were military officers from the Mu Shin Clan. They were mostly relatives of the royal family (왕실의 외척), meritorious officials (공신), or close relatives (종친). In other words, individuals who had close blood or kinship ties with the king were appointed as Training Commanders. For example, it is said that the reason for the success of the Injo Restoration was because they incorporated Lee Heung-rip (이흥립), who was the Training Commander at the time, and the Training Commander had such authority that they could determine the fate of a country.

In the beginning, it was originally a temporary organization of a total of 80 people who served as Training Commanders in the late Joseon period. In particular, Yi Gi-ha (이기하), Yu Hyuk-yeon (유혁연), Yi Hwan (이완), and Kim Seong-eung (김성응) served as Training Commanders for over 10 years and operated the Training Headquarters under the trust of the king. The Nungseong-gu Clan and Pyeongsan-shin Clan were the families that produced the most Training Commanders. Gu In-hu (구인후) and Gu Sun-bok (구선복), Shin Gyeong-jin (신경진), and Shin Heon (신헌) are representative figures.

=== Units ===
They maintained about 1,000 troops, but the number gradually increased to 1,230 soldiers of various types. Prior to the outbreak of the Qing invasion of Joseon when relations with the Qing Dynasty deteriorated, they maintained about 5,000 troops which then grew to 10,000.

The organization was structured as two departments, left and right, consisting of six divisions, which were further divided into 33 "Cheo" units. In other words, it consisted of 7 cavalry units (119 soldiers per unit) with a total of 833 soldiers, 20 artillery units (122 soldiers per unit) with a total of 2,440 soldiers, and 6 assassins units (123 soldiers per unit) with a total of 738 soldiers, for a total of 4,011 soldiers in 33 units. As the organization expanded, there were also 10 "Mungwan" officers, 10 "Byeongmungwan" officers, 10 "Jikokwan" officers, 20 "Gwihwaigan" officers, 50 "Hwanmugwan" officers, 5 "Dutychong" officers, 6 "Gwangwan" officers, and 1 "Yakbang-Hyeonyi-Mayi" officer each, who were involved in various military training and administrative tasks of the Training Manual. In addition to the regular soldiers, there were also 68 "Byeokmushi" soldiers, 33 "Hanryu" soldiers, 150 soldiers from the "Gwol" department, and 198 "Buyeokwan" soldiers in the Training Manual, but the previously mentioned officials such as "Gwonmu-gunwan" and "Hanyeo-Gukchulsin" were all soldiers who received treatment based on their military achievements.

The military strength of the Training Headquarters continuously changed over time, and its organization also underwent frequent changes. Therefore, I will introduce the structure of the Training Headquarters during the reign of Sukjong. The Training Headquarters was divided into cavalry, infantry, and national-origin soldiers. The cavalry had six Chogwan under the command of the left and right Byeoljang, and the infantry had six Pachong under the left and right Cheonchong, and under them, there were 26 Chogwan. There were three Byeoljang for the national-origin soldiers. In other words, there were a total of 34 Chogwan, and each Chogwan had 113 to 119 troops under its command. Under the Chogwan, there were Gi (旗), Dae (隊), and O (伍). There were Ki Chong (旗摠) and Daejang (隊長) to command them. The soldiers in the Training Headquarters were organized into units called "Eobang" (어방), which consisted of 100 soldiers. Each Eobang was led by an Eobangjang (어방장). Multiple Eobang formed a "Jip" (집), which was commanded by a Jipjang (집장). Several Jip together formed a "Dae" (대), which was led by a Daejang (대장). The Daejang held a higher rank and had more authority than the lower-ranking officers.

==== Composition ====
Many people wanted to join the Training Headquarters because soldiers in the Training Headquarters received salaries. The Training Headquarters consisted of a diverse range of personnel as soldiers. This was also because the Training Headquarters recruited soldiers as part of a policy to help the hungry (기민) and displaced people (유민) who were scattered during the war. As a result, the recruited soldiers in the Training Headquarters included both Yangin and Geumgundo, as well as scholars (유생), wanderers (한량), and even slaves and monks. Most of them were displaced people who resided near Seoul, and they were mainly composed of lower-class people. They gathered in the Training Headquarters because they received monthly salaries to support their livelihoods. In particular, the commoners received special privileges by being affiliated with the Training Headquarters, such as exemption from corvée labor and tax benefits.

== Funding ==
In the early days of establishment, the training camp (dojang) provided regular training to soldiers and paid them monthly salaries, although not on a fixed schedule. Through tests and evaluations such as "試才" and "鋉才," soldiers were assessed, and allowances such as clothing expenses ("衣資") were provided. In addition, provisions were given to soldiers' wives ("妻料"). However, since the dojang itself was a temporary military camp established to overcome chaos, there were no consistent financial measures to sustain it. Therefore, in order to secure a stable economic foundation, the government expanded production and tried to establish a self-sufficient system, known as "三手糧" (san-su-ryang), in the late years of King Sunjo's reign.

However, even with the implementation of the "san-su-ryang" system, it was not enough to maintain the salaries of regular soldiers. Since all the troops in the Training Headquarters were part of the reserve army, the monthly salaries they received had a serious impact on the national finances. As a result, there were several discussions to reduce the troops and even to abolish the Training Agency. Therefore, in the six provinces excluding Pyeongan Province and Hamgyeong Province, 37,194 soldiers were assigned to artillery defense ("砲保") duties, and an additional 7,000 soldiers were assigned to supply protection ("餉保") duties. They collected two bundles of hay or 12 dou of rice from these soldiers as a means of compensation. Furthermore, in order to reduce the number of soldiers in the dojang and save costs, training detachments were established to replace the long-term guards ("長番"). However, this led to the creation of the "禁衛營" (prohibited guards) and did not effectively reduce the military expenses because the dojang remained the core defense camp even after the establishment of the Five Military Camps system.

During the reign of King Yeongjo, the military was funded through the "均役廳" (equitable service bureau), which reduced the burden of supplying horses to a ratio of 1 bundle per household. With this financial foundation, the cavalry troops were paid 10 dou of rice and 9 dou of barley, and those without horses were paid 9 dou of barley. However, when soldiers initially joined the agency, they were only paid 4 dou of barley, and through evaluations, they could receive between 7 and 9 dou of barley. However, they were not paid more than 9 dou of barley.

== Duties ==
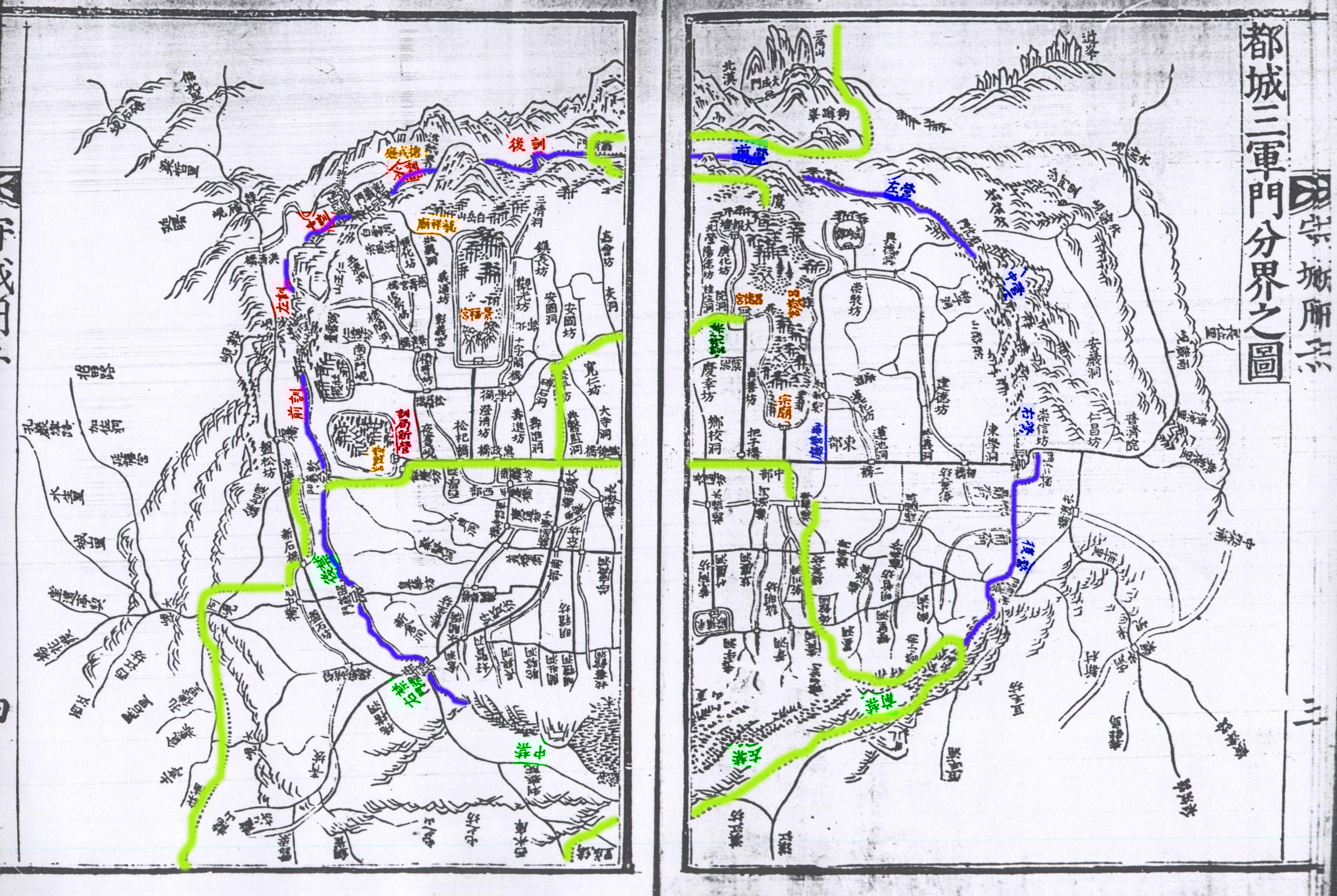
Illustration file to explain the Doseongsam-gun gate boundary map.

The initially established Military Training Agency was responsible for training local troops as well as dividing the metropolitan area into five camps and assigning them to each of the five camps, which were also responsible for protecting the royal authority and carrying out the duties of capturing thieves and patrolling. These soldiers of the Military Training Agency, known as "gyepryobyeong" (給料兵), were employed and served not only as the king's guards but also as defenders of the capital and the frontiers, thus becoming the core of the five military camps.

In addition to their military duties, the soldiers in the Training Headquarters also performed various other tasks. They were responsible for guarding important government facilities, maintaining public order, and assisting in the enforcement of laws. They also participated in ceremonial events and served as a symbol of royal authority. Overall, the Training Headquarters had a hierarchical organizational structure, with the Training Commander holding the highest authority. The soldiers in the Training Headquarters came from various backgrounds but were united under the common goal of serving the government and maintaining military readiness.

The Training Command was the leading military organization responsible for the defense of the capital and the protection of the king in late Joseon Dynasty. It was the first military organization of the late Joseon military system, known as the Five Army Camps (오군영). As all personnel received salaries and worked as professional soldiers, they were recognized as elite troops.

The main duties of the Training Command in the late Joseon Dynasty were to guard the area around the king's throne (전좌), patrol the palace gates, and provide security inside the palace. They also guarded the king's sleeping quarters within the palace. When the king traveled outside the palace, the Training Command was responsible for his security. They led the procession when the king received envoys, paid respects to royal tombs, or traveled to hot springs. They also played a role in escorting the king's palanquin in all directions when the procession stopped temporarily. Although the responsibility for guarding the king was later divided among the three army camps, namely Geumwiyeong, Eoyeongcheong, and Training Command, the Training Command held the highest position among them.

It was responsible for the defense and protection of the capital city. One of the core duties of the Training Command was the defense of the capital city. As Hanyang (Seoul) was the place where government officials resided, it was necessary to ensure its defense. With the establishment of the Training Command and subsequent installations of Eoyeongcheong and Geumwiyeong, these three army camps were responsible for guarding different sections of the capital city. The soldiers of the Training Command were stationed at the defensive facilities regardless of the time, apprehending thieves and maintaining public order. They also played a role in preventing fires.

While guarding the palace and the capital city was the most important task of the Training Command, they also had various other responsibilities during peacetime. Firstly, the Training Command was responsible for manufacturing weapons such as muskets (조종) and gunpowder. They were also responsible for maintaining and repairing the areas they guarded, including the palace, the capital city, and Bukhansanseong. If the walls were damaged, they were responsible for repairing them. Interestingly, the Training Command also played a role in minting coins (동전). This was because they had the necessary metals for coin production, skilled artisans, and the military capacity to protect the minted coins, which served as a source of revenue.

=== Training ===
In August 1593 (the 26th year of King Seonjo's reign), the establishment of the Military Training Institute was solidified. Initially, the Military Training Institute was established as a temporary facility rather than an official military camp. The artillery unit, which mainly used cannons, was the first to be formed, followed by the inclusion of swordsmen (salsu, 殺手) and skilled archers (sasu, 射手). King Seonjo installed the Military Training Institute to discuss and train methods of archery, artillery, and martial arts. The training methods of the Military Training Institute were based on the three techniques (san-su gihap, 三手技法) of artillery (po-beop, 砲法), archery (sa-beop, 射法), and swordsmanship (gam-beop, 砍法) described in the military manualJixiao Xinshu by Qi Jiguang. Recognizing the effectiveness of firearms (hwagi, 火器) during the Battle of Pyongyang Castle, Joseon made efforts in the production and operation of firearms and sought suitable military tactics accordingly.

As the later military system was gradually established, the Military Training Agency became the core defense camp in the capital, responsible for protecting the royal authority, as well as defending the palace, the capital city of Seoul, along with the Royal Guards and the Geumwi Camp. It continued to play a role in guarding the king during his movements, defending Seoul's western and northern areas, and protecting the capital's inner and outer areas. It also shared responsibilities such as guarding the royal palace walls and defending the nearby mountains and rivers. In other words, the dojang became one of the essential central military camps, fulfilling various roles. During the collapse of the political power of the bungdang system, it became an integral part of strengthening the royal authority during the reign of King Yeongjo.

The soldiers in the Training Headquarters underwent rigorous military training. They were trained in various martial arts, archery, horseback riding, and other military skills. The purpose of the Training Headquarters was to maintain a well-trained standing army that could be mobilized in times of war or emergencies. Therefore, the soldiers in the Training Headquarters were considered elite troops and were expected to have a higher level of discipline and skill compared to regular soldiers.

=== Three Military Garrisons ===
During the reign of King Sukjong, the three army camps divided the defense of the capital city. The "Map of the Division of the Three Army Camps in the Capital City" (도성삼군문분계지도) indicates the areas that the three army camps guarded within the capital city. The Training Command was responsible for guarding the northwest part of the capital city. It covered the area from the east of Sukjeongmun (肅靖門) to Changuimun (彰義門) in the north and Donuimun (敦義門) in the west. This area was located on the road leading to Pyeongan Province and was the closest to the northern invasion. Moreover, it was a crucial area as it connected to Bukhansanseong. Due to the high status of the Training Command, they were entrusted with protecting the most important area.

The Three Military Garrisons (Samgunyeong, 삼군영; 三軍營) was a central military camp formed during the development of the capital defense system in the late Joseon Dynasty. It consists of the Military Training Agency, the Royal Guards Command, and the Capital Garrison. The soldiers of the Three Military Garrisons lived in Hanyang and played a key role in guarding the king, guarding the palace, defending the capital, and maintaining public order. The Military Training Agency primarily defended the northern and parts of the western and central regions.

== Office of Martial Arts Guards ==
The Office of Martial Arts Guards (무예청 (武藝廳)) was a division of the Military Training Agency, who served as guards for King Seonjo during the Imjin War. It was an organization composed of skilled martial artists who were responsible for guarding the five grand palaces and providing close protection to the king. The officers belonging to the office were specially referred to as Martial Arts Special Guards (무예별감) or simply Martial Guards ("무감", 武監). It was also known as the military officials (mugwan (무관 (武官)).

The establishment process of the Office of Martial Arts Guards is detailed in King Sunjo of Joseon's work called Pure Study Records (순제고). The Office of Martial Arts Guards selected exceptional individuals with outstanding martial arts skills from the military training center (훈련도감).

== Dissolution ==
However, in 1882 (King Gojong's 19th year), it was abolished as a result of the establishment of a new modern army called the Byeolgigun (별기군). Just before the abolition of the Training Headquarters, they opposed the new army and supported the Daewongun, leading to the Imo Incident. However, this rebellion was quickly suppressed, and the Training Headquarters was completely abolished.
