= List of parks in Gyeonggi Province =

List of parks in Gyeonggi Province includes parks in Gyeonggi Province, South Korea.

== Bukhansan National Park ==
Designated as a national park in 1983, Bukhansan National Park includes both Bukhansan as well as Dobongsan Mountain. The word Bukhansanseong was coined after the construction of Bukhansanseong during the Joseon Dynasty.

== Manseok Park ==
Manseok Park, where Dulle-gil is built, is in full bloom around cherry blossoms in spring. Fountain shows will be held from May to September.

== Bundang Central Park ==
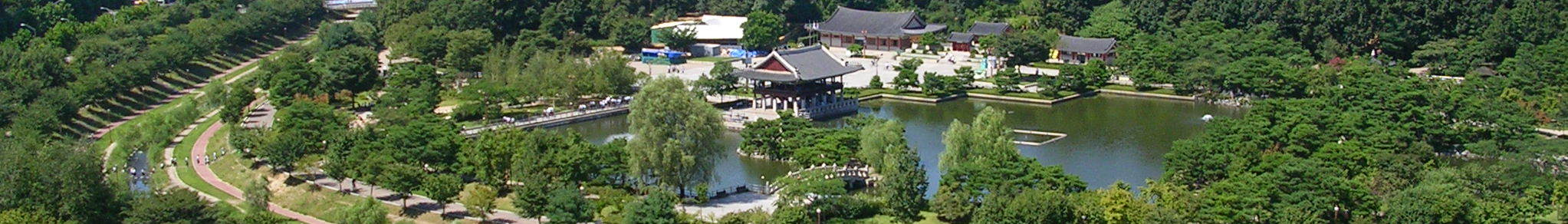
Bundang Central Park in Seongnam

Bundang Central Park is a public park in Bundang, Seongnam.

== Gwanggyo Lake Park ==
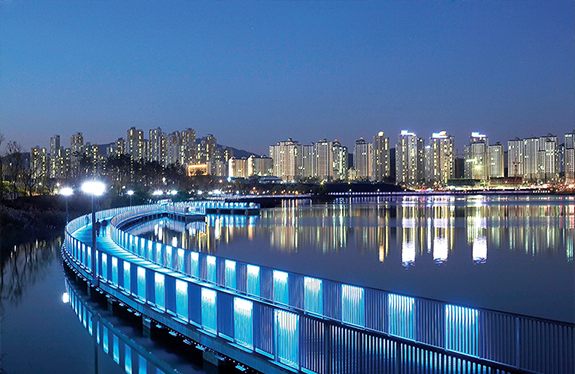
Gwanggyo Lake Park in Suwon

Gwanggyo Lake Park is located in Yeongtong District, Suwon. It was once a reservoir but was rebuilt into a lake park in 2013.

== Ilsan Lake Park ==
Ilsan Lake Park is one of the largest artificial lakes in South Korea. There are a total of 9.1km trails around the lake, including a 4.7km bicycle path.

== See also ==
- National park
