= Royal Defense Command =

1596–1884 Korean military organization

Royal Defence Command
- Coat of Arms of Joseon
- Active: 1626
- Disbanded: 1884
- Country: (Korea) Joseon
- Allegiance: (Korea) King of Joseon
- Branch: Joseon Army
- Type: Garrison army
- Role: Coastal defence and fortification Charge; Counterattack; Domestic security Hand-to-hand combat Public security Raiding; Reconnaissance; Screening; Security checkpoint
- Size: 16,500
- Part of: Five Army Camps
- Garrison/HQ: Namhansanseong

Insignia
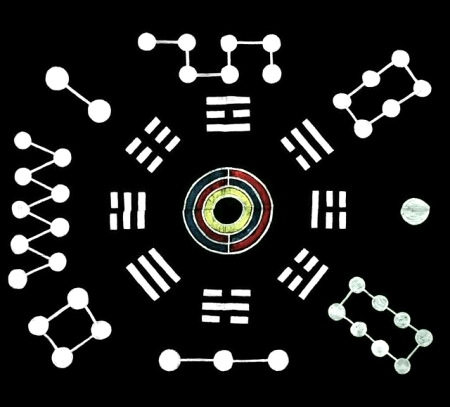
- Ensign

Korean name
- Hangul: 수어청
- Hanja: 守禦廳
- RR: Sueocheong
- MR: Suŏch'ŏng

The Royal Defense Command (Korean: 수어청; Hanja: 守禦廳) was established during the late period of the Joseon Dynasty in 1626 (the 4th year of King Injo's reign) for the defense of Namhansanseong. It defended the south of Hanseong through Namhanseong Fortress with 16,500 troops. The military camp system was established in 1656 (the 7th year of King Hyojong's reign) when the Royal Defense Command, which was responsible for the defense and management of the fortress, was introduced for the first time. The defense of Namhansanseong against external invasions from both the north and the south was not limited to the military forces around Gyeonggi Province, but also included the military forces of the local districts along the enemy's invasion routes, incorporating them into the Soyeong system to focus on the defense of the fortress. Royal Defense Command established its headquarters, Gyeongcheong (Capital Office), in Jinjangbang, the northern part of Hansungbu. The commander, Suosa (Defender), concurrently held the position of Hansungbuyun (Governor of Hansungbu). However, in 1795 (the 19th year of King Jeongjo's reign), King Jeongjo reorganized the organization of Suocheong. The Gyeongcheong was abolished, and the headquarters was moved to Namhansanseong, elevating the position of Gwangjubuyun (Governor of Gwangju) to Gwangjuyusu (Resident of Gwangju) and concurrently holding the position of Suosa.

== Establishment ==
The establishment of Royal Defense Command is said to have taken place in ≪Sokdaejeon≫, by remodeling Namhansanseong in the 4th year of King Injo's reign (1626) and establishing the administrative offices of Gwangju, etc., though mention of its establishment cannot be found in the records from the time. Namhansanseong was rebuilt as a defensive position on the outskirts of the capital or as a refuge in case of emergency in response to increased pressure from the Later Jin Dynasty, whose power expanded during the period of domestic and international turmoil following the Japanese invasion of Korea. The work lasted from July of the 2nd year of King Injo's reign, to November of the 4th year of King Injo's reign, with Buddhist priests from all over the country as the main laborers, and Samnammunjeongsa Temple and others as Namhan Gujang-dang under the general supervision of Chongyungsa Lee Su. However, the Qing invasion of Joseon broke out before the necessary defense facilities and systems were in place. Therefore, various systems were established after this Horan, and in November of the 6th year of King Injo's reign, Lee Si-myeong, the governor of Gwangju, was appointed as the commander of Namhansanseong, and he moved the capital to the inside of the fortress and was given 20 Gyeol of Guangju County to begin establishing a defense system.

Initially, it started with Yi Seo, who served as both a military officer in Gyeonggi Province and the chief commander overseeing the construction of Namhansanseong Fortress. In regard to the establishment of Royal Defense Command (central military camp), "Sokdaejeon" records that in 1626 (the 4th year of Injo's reign), Namhansanseong was constructed and a cheong (headquarters) was established to properly manage the military affairs of Gwangju and other regions. However, the records from that time do not mention the actual establishment of Royal Defense Command. Around 1632, shortly after the Jeongmyo War, the title of Suosa (defensive commander) was first introduced, and after the Byeongjahoran War in 1636, the Suo system centered around Suosa in Namhansanseong was established.

== Organization ==
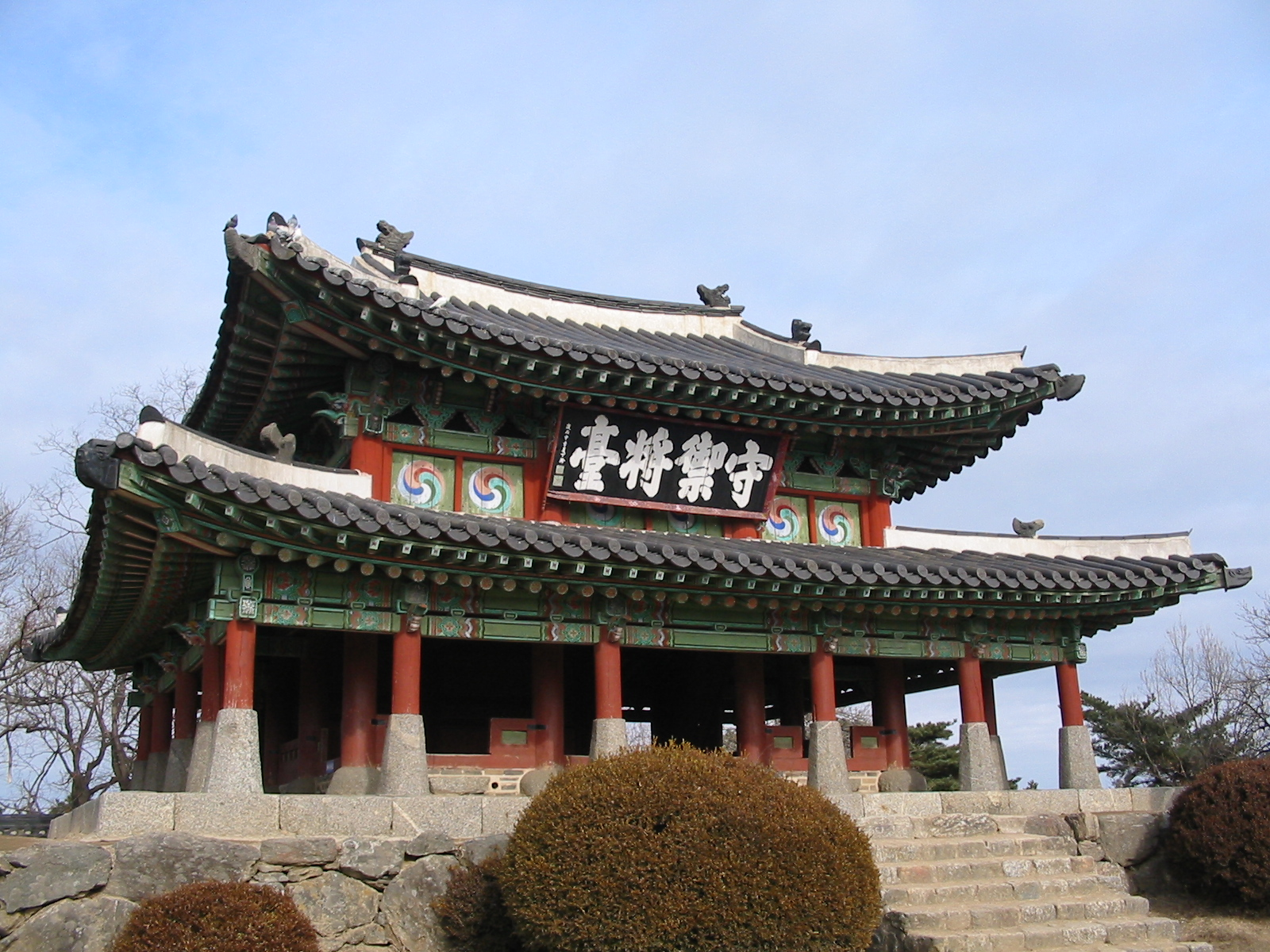
Sueojangdae, the command post of Namhansanseong, the headquarters of the Royal Defense Command.

Suocheong was organized under Gyeonggi Province, with Namhansanseong Fortress as its base. Conflicts arose between the Suosa, who held military authority as a high-ranking court official, and the Gwangju Buyun, responsible for administration. To address these contradictions, a dual system was adopted, with Abyeong soldiers from the Left and Right divisions serving in the capital, and the Buyun appointed as Busa (deputy commander) overseeing Namhansanseong Fortress. However, the fundamental contradiction remained unresolved. Throughout its existence, Royal Defense Command underwent various changes in its organizational structure and leadership positions. During times of emergency, the Sokeogun of Gwangju, Yangju, Juk-san, and other regions defended the camp.

After the Qing invasion of Joseon, various interests were intertwined between Sueosa of Gyeongbok, the military officer appointed as Minister of Huncheok surrounding Namhansanseong Fortress, and Busa, Gwangju Buyun (promoted from 牧使 in the first month of the 14th year of King Injo's reign), the administrative officer. In order to resolve these contradictions, sometimes the Suryeogyeongcheong is moved to the fortress and Gwangju Buyun is promoted to a military base to serve as a unitary system, and sometimes it is reduced to a dual system where a separate sueosa protects the fortress. In the midst of the struggle for military power, several changes took place. In other words, changes in the Ministry of Environment (single-won system) in the 9th year of King Sukjong (1683), the 16th year of King Sukjong (dual-won system), the 26th year of King Yeongjo (single-won system), and the Environmental Office (dual-won system) in the 35th year of King Yeongjo’s reign.

=== Command ===
The command structure consisted of a Sa (Commander), Junggun (Deputy Commander), Gunjang (Division Commander), Byeoljang (Brigade Commander), Cheonchong (Regiment Commander), Pachong (Battalion Commander), and Chogwan (Company Commander), similar to other garrisons. In the early stages of the unit's establishment, the main focus was on actual combat and defense forces. However, after the headquarters was relocated to Namhansanseong during King Jeongjo's reign, the number of gunners (artillery troops) gradually increased. During times of emergency, the Sokeogun of Gwangju, Yangju, Juk-san, and other regions defended the establishment of Suocheong, a central military camp in the late Joseon period, is recorded in historical documents. Initially, Namhansanseong Fortress was constructed in 1626, and a cheong (headquarters) was established to manage military affairs in Gwangju and surrounding regions. However, the actual establishment of Suocheong is not explicitly mentioned in the records from that time.

It is thought that Sueosa was appointed in the 10th year of King Injo's reign. The first record of Sueosa is that of Silrok, who was replaced in November 10th year of King Injo's reign, with Lee Jeong-il as Sueosa and Shim Gi-won as his assistant. Therefore, it is thought that the fortress defense officer, who also served as Gwangju pastor, was changed to Sueosa in the 10s of King Injo and took full charge of fortress affairs, and the following year, the busa was changed to 別將, establishing the Sueosa and villa system. However, at the time, Namhansanseong Fortress was not an independent military camp in name and reality of Royal Defense Command because it was within the three-yeong system of Gwangju Moksa, Sueosa, and Chongyungsa Iseo, which controlled the military jurisdiction of the entire Gyeonggi Province. In February of the 12th year of King Injo's reign, when Chongyungsa Yi Seo was replaced by Byeong, the dual system of Gwangju Moksa and Sueosa Temple changed.

=== System ===
Suocheong was organized under Gyeonggi Province, with Namhansanseong as its base. As a result, various conflicts arose between Suosa, who was appointed as the military authority as a high-ranking court official, and Gwangju Buyun, who was responsible for administration. To overcome these contradictions, a dual system was adopted where the Left and Right divisions' Abyeong served in the capital, and when overseeing Namhansanseong Fortress, Buyun was appointed as Busa (deputy commander). However, the fundamental contradiction was not resolved. The finances of the Sueocheong, like the Command of the Northern Approaches, were based on its own economic base, such as the opening of Dunjeon, non-transcending production, or military maintenance, but it was always insufficient and could not avoid its smallness.

The Royal Defense Command system began to take shape around 1632 with the introduction of the title Suosa (defensive commander). After the invasion in 1636, the Suo system centered around the Suosa in Namhansanseong Fortress was established. Subsequently, the subordinate camp system, known as Sokyeong taeje, was developed around 1656. This system involved nearby military forces entering the fortress to provide defense. Initially, temporary defenses were organized by mobilizing soldiers from various regions. When Suosa combined with Gwangju Buyun, the Judge (Pangwan) also served as the commander of the whole camp. In the later period, the organization shifted from a 1 Yeong=5 Sa system to a 4 Sa system, but there were no changes in the 3 Yeongs and 2 Bus system. As a result, Gwangju Buyun was promoted to a higher position, and Suocheong was relocated to the fortress, creating a unified system where Suosa also held the position of Suosa in the fortress. However, this also did not resolve the fundamental contradiction, leading to several changes, including the reintroduction of the capital.

It was around the 7th year of King Hyojong's reign that the military administration system of Royal Defense Command, which was free of change, was established. In other words, the system for entering the mountain fortress was established for the first time.. However, under the jurisdiction of Sueosa, in reality, in times of emergency, the defense officer of Gwangju took charge of all military affairs of the 3 Yeonggi Provinces of Gyeonggi Province, and the soldiers of other provinces were allowed to enter Namhansanseong Fortress by the governor, warrant officer, or defense officer.0517)In the 4th year of King Hyeonjong's reign (1663), this provincial system was changed again to a 4-yeong and 3-bu system. In other words, Chungju, which was part of the main office, was excluded from the entrance to the fortress to protect Yeongju, and Yeongwon (淮陽) was excluded from the fortress entrance to protect the northern road, and four provinces were created into Guangju, Yangju, Jeoksan, and Wonju, and Jeonghwaeong and Wonju were appointed instead. The left division consisted of the cattle units located in each town in the Gyeonggi Province, the right division comprised the infantry units located in each village in the Hoseo region, as well as 8,800 new recruits from towns in the Yeongseo region and 300 old cattle units from Hongju, Gyeongseong, and Seopyeong. In total, it was organized into a 4-young and 3-part system with about 20,000 Suseong-jol soldiers, and the Sanseong 僧廍 army was also organized. Therefore, in order to defend against foreign invasions from the south and north, the organization of the Royal Defense Command was centered on Namhansanseong Fortress. From the beginning, it was not only organized into the military of Gyeonggi-do, but even the military of villages that could become enemy infiltration routes were incorporated into the subordinate system and made efforts to defend the fortress. In addition, this 4-Yeong 3-part system, like the Command of the Northern Approaches, is an inner-outer-yeong system with three inner-yeongs centered on listening and four outer-yeongs centered on inner-yeong.

=== Divisions ===
The unit was organized into a system of 3 divisions and 2 brigades. The majority of the troops in the Royal Defense Command Garrison were from Gyeonggi Province. The soldiers were Sogogun and junior soldiers who belonged to the 2 brigades and three divisions. These Sogogun were based on duty, and the Asyeong were soldiers who made their living based on dunjeon. In particular, under the dual system, these subordinate soldiers were directly subordinate to the left and right villas of Cheongcheong (Sueocheong), but even after the unification of the mountain fortress, the mountain castle villa disappeared, and the left villa was taken over by the Yeoju cattle commander, and the right villa was taken over by the Rikgwa branch commander.

These soldiers of the subordinate army served as mounts in each camp and participated in the Great Battle at the mountain fortress once every three years to learn the rules of righteousness, practice military skills, and repair the military camp. The subordinate forces and positions mobilized during the Seongjeong period are as follows. The outline of the subordinate camp system (Sokyeong taeje) in which nearby military forces entered the fortress and guarded it was first revealed around 1656 (the 7th year of Hyojong's reign). Initially, to defend Namhansanseong Fortress on the outskirts of Seoul, a temporary defense system was established by mobilizing 1,600 soldiers from Gwangju County, Juk-sanjin, Yangjujin, and Wonsu-jin in Gangwon Province, Hwiyangjin, and Chungjujin in Chungcheong Province. The organizational structure of Suocheong underwent several changes and gradually transformed into a military system called the "3 Yeongs (camps) and 2 Bus (divisions)" in 1704 (the 30th year of Sukjong's reign). The three Yeongs were established in Gwangju, Juk-san, and Yangju, and the organization consisted of a total of 5 sa (divisions) and 25 cho (sub-divisions).

The two Bus were divided into the Left and Right divisions, consisting of Abyeong (infantry), Mabyeong (cavalry), Huneomabogun (training and mounted infantry), and Chinya-gun (personal guards). Abyeong had 16 cho, Mabyeong had 3 cho, and the numbers for Huneomabogun and Chinya-gun are unknown. The 3 Yeongs and 2 Bus system consisted of a total of 32,000 personnel, including 16,500 soldiers and various support personnel such as Pyoha-gun (subordinate soldiers) and Gunsu-nobo (military supply slaves). Also, like the Command of the Northern Approaches, other Pyohagun, and military personnel under the basic system of commanders, central soldiers, byeoljang, dispatch commanders, first officers, drill officers, military officers, and Hanryang military officers. In addition, just as Command of the Northern Approaches had the Bukhansanseongcheong, Royal Defense Command also had the Namhansanseongcheong, so there was a separate organization below the Jeongseongjang (廣州留守兼).

This system of 4 camps and 3 departments had some changes, such as the abolition of the sub-soldier registration system that used to serve as a military officer, but it was maintained until the 30s of King Sukjong's reign and formed a dual wall of defense military camps on the outskirts of the capital along with Command of the Northern Approaches. The Royal Defense Command abolished the camps of other provinces that were installed along the route of Jeokchim in the past and replacing them with Gyeonggi-do County. As a result, the three Yeongs of Gyeongju, Cheongju, and Jangsan on the left side of Gyeonggi Province belonged to the Royal Defense Command, and the three Yeongs of Namyang, Suwonju, and Jangjeong on the Gyeonggi Udo Island belonged to the Command of the Northern Approaches and were responsible for guarding the outskirts of the capital from the north and south. All of the Hoseo infantry units belonging to the Northern Defense Command's headquarters were Chungcheong-do troops, and they were 12 seconds, 12 infantry heads (later 6 heads) and 6 female infantry heads (later 3 heads) of non-speeding military units. It was established as a military branch, and it can be seen that this was a military branch established for financial preservation rather than a purely military function.

== Decline ==
As the Royal Defense Command was permanently deployed to Namhansanseong Fortress during the reign of King Jeongjo, the Pyohagun, Abyeong, Byeolpajin, Gyeongju Army (those within the precincts of Gyeongju as the Yeongju Army belonged to the Sureocheong), monks, and various military officers who were transferred from Cheongjeong were all mere Sumipogun. It had little use as a water fish group. In particular, there were as many as 5,000 people who belonged to the ranks of military officers, but they were all non-communicative, non-independent, and non-competitive, and the Nabmi army also used this to build stations, so it almost lost its effectiveness in the later period.

There is a systematic structure institutionally, but in reality, tongs, etc. are rarely performed. In other words, there were cases in which a person did not perform sexual intercourse even once for 20 years due to reasons such as age, fatigue, illness, physical activity, and fatigue. In particular, during the reign of King Jeongjo, Jangyongyeong was established to strengthen the royal authority, and most of Gyeonggi-gun belonged to Jangyongyeong, so Royal Defense Command, which also served as the governor of Gwangju, could not maintain the system of a military camp.

== Dissolution ==
There was a systematic structure in place, but in reality, ceremonies such as the Sungjo (rituals performed by the king) were rarely conducted. In other words, there were cases where a Sungjo was not performed for as long as 20 years due to reasons such as bad harvests, hindrance to agriculture, epidemic diseases, royal decrees, and royal visits. In 1795 (the 19th year of King Jeongjo's reign), with the aim of strengthening royal authority, Jangyongyeong (壯勇營) was established. Most of the Gyeonggi troops were included in the Jangyongwaeyoung (the Jangyong's external army). The Royal Defense Command, which was also responsible for the Gyeonggi province, could not maintain its military organization and was completely abolished along with the Gyeongcheong making the defense of the fortress permanent and part of the national defense system (Gwangju Yusu) and the jurisdiction of Gwangju Buyun, breaking away from the Gyeonggi military gate and becoming an independent military unit.

== See also ==
- Joseon Army
- Five Army Camps
- Command of the Northern Approaches
