= Dobong =

Dobong (in Korean 도봉) may refer to:

- Dobong District (도봉구, Dobong-gu), one of the 25 districts of Seoul, South Korea
- Dobong Station, a metro station on Seoul Subway Line 1 north of Seoul that offers services connecting the city to the cities to the north in Gyeonggi-do
- Mount Dobong, or Dobongsan, a mountain in Bukhansan National Park, South Korea

== See also ==
- Dobong-dong is a dong, a neighbourhood of Dobong-gu in Seoul, South Korea
