= Jungheungsa =

Temple in South Korea

Jungheungsa Temple (Korean: 중흥사) is a Buddhist temple in South Korea. It was the command post of the military temples (eleven temples, two hermitages) and 350 monk-soldiers stationed at Bukhansanseong Fortress, as well as the residence of the chief commander and his men.

It is not known exactly when Jungheungsa was established, but considering the artifacts found inside it, it appears to have been built during the Goryeo Dynasty. A bronze gong and an incense burner were found inside the temple, both bearing the written inscription "Samgaksan Jungheungsa" (Jungheungsa Temple of Samgaksan Mountain), indicating they were the temple's property. After running dating tests on the two relics, it was confirmed that the gong was made around the year 1103 A.D. (the 8th year of the reign of King Sukjong), and the incense burner around 1344 A.D. (the 5th year of the reign of King Chunghye). Thus, the dating of these artifacts suggests that the temple was built sometime in the early 12th century at the least.

According to Bukhanji (Geographical Record of Bukhansanseong Fortress, 1745), Jungheungsa was a small temple measuring 30 kan (a unit of measurement referring to the distance between two columns), but it was later expanded to 136 kan in 1711 (the 37th year of the reign of King Sukjong), the year in which Bukhansanseong was completed. After the Japanese Invasion of Korea in 1592 and the Manchu Invasion of 1636, the defensive system around the capital was also expanded. The temple consisted of Daeungjeon Hall, Manseru Pavilion, Sansindang Shrine, and a stone monument bearing the inscription "Jungheungdongmun" (East Gate of Jungheungsa Temple). The temple was destroyed by a flood in 1915, but Daeungjeon Hall and the dormitory were restored in 2012.
