= Bukhansan National Park =

Mountain park north of Seoul, South Korea

- 북한산국립공원, 北漢山國立公園
- IUCN category II (national park)
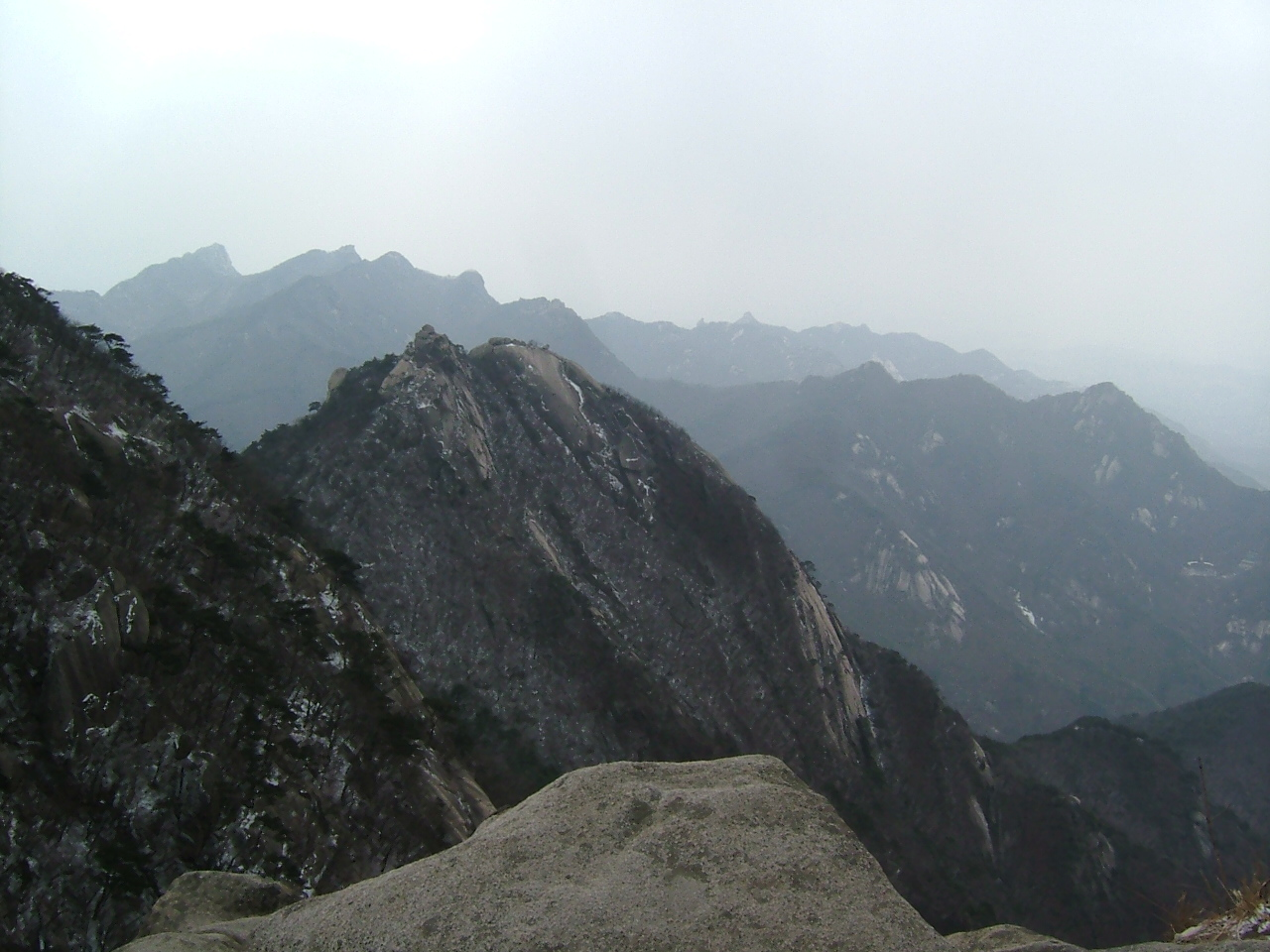
- Bukhansan National Park, from near the peak of Mt Baekundae.
- Interactive map of Bukhansan National Park
- Location: Gyeonggi Province and Seoul, South Korea
- Coordinates: 37.675°N 126.982°E
- Area: 79.92 km^{2} (30.86 sq mi)
- Established: 2 April 1983
- Visitors: Around five million
- Governing body: Korea National Park Service
- Website: english.knps.or.kr/Knp/Bukhansan/Intro/Introduction.aspx

The twenty-two national parks of South Korea.
Land-based parks are in red and marine parks are in blue.

The Bukhansan National Park (Korean: 북한산국립공원; Hanja: 北漢山國立公園) in Seoul and Gyeonggi Province covers an area of 79.92 km^{2} (30.86 sq mi) and was established on 2 April 1983. Bukhansan means "mountains north of the Han River".

The park contains forested areas, temples and granite peaks. The three main peaks are Baekundae, 836.5 m (2,744 ft), Insubong, 810.5 m (2,659 ft) and Mangnyeongdae, 799.5 m (2,623 ft). Due to its popularity with hikers and Seoul residents, some trails are closed on a rotation basis to protect the local environment.

The Bukhansanseong Fortress is located in the park, together with its 9.5 km (5.9 mi) long defensive wall. A fortress was first built on this site in 132 AD to protect Seoul from foreign invasions, and it was expanded to its current size in 1711. It was reconstructed after damage sustained in the Korean War. Despite its name, this mountain is in Seoul, South Korea, so this mountain should not be confused with North Korea (also referred to as 북한, bukhan).

== Name ==
There is a current movement to have the name of Bukhansan reverted. For many years up until now, the three main peaks of the park have collectively been called "Bukhansan"; however, the original collective name of these three peaks was Samgaksan, meaning "three horned mountains". The Gangbuk-gu District Office in Seoul is leading a petition to have the central government change the name back to the original. Civilians, religious leaders, other district offices, and groups, such as the Korean Mountaineering League, are assisting in the lobbying to have the name of the three original peaks reverted to Samgaksan.

== Features ==
=== Trails ===
There are many trails and the most known routes include Baegundae (백운대), which is Bukhansan's highest peak at 837 meters, the fortress wall, and the Insu-bong (인수봉) which rises up to 810.5 meters. The 70 kilometer Dulle-gil Trail (둘레길) connects forested paths along foothills and villages, 21 sections out of total. Dobongsan (도봉산) is another popular entry point into the park featuring a trail that starts near Dobongsan Station. This hiking route features steep climbs using handrails and is a popular rock climbing area.

== Gallery ==
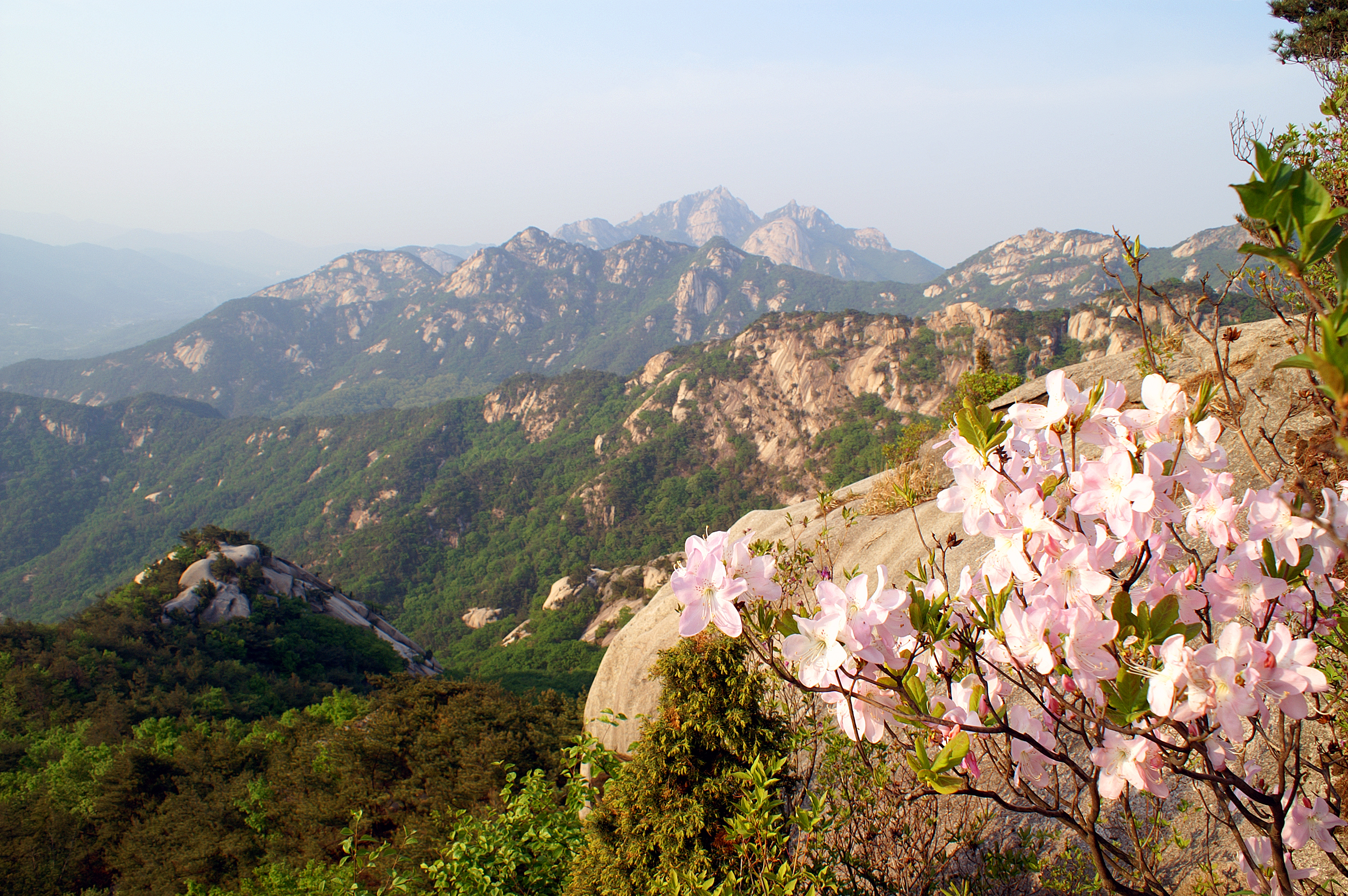
Azaleas in bloom on the mountain (2006)

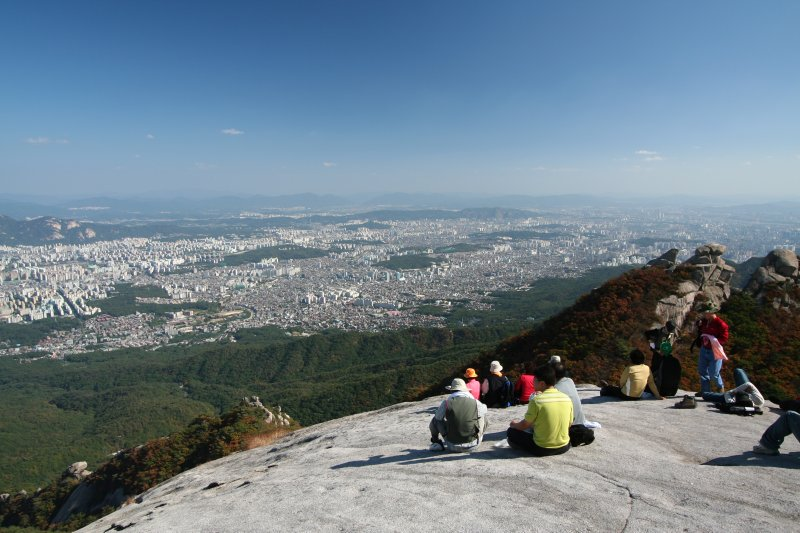
Looking over Seoul (2005)

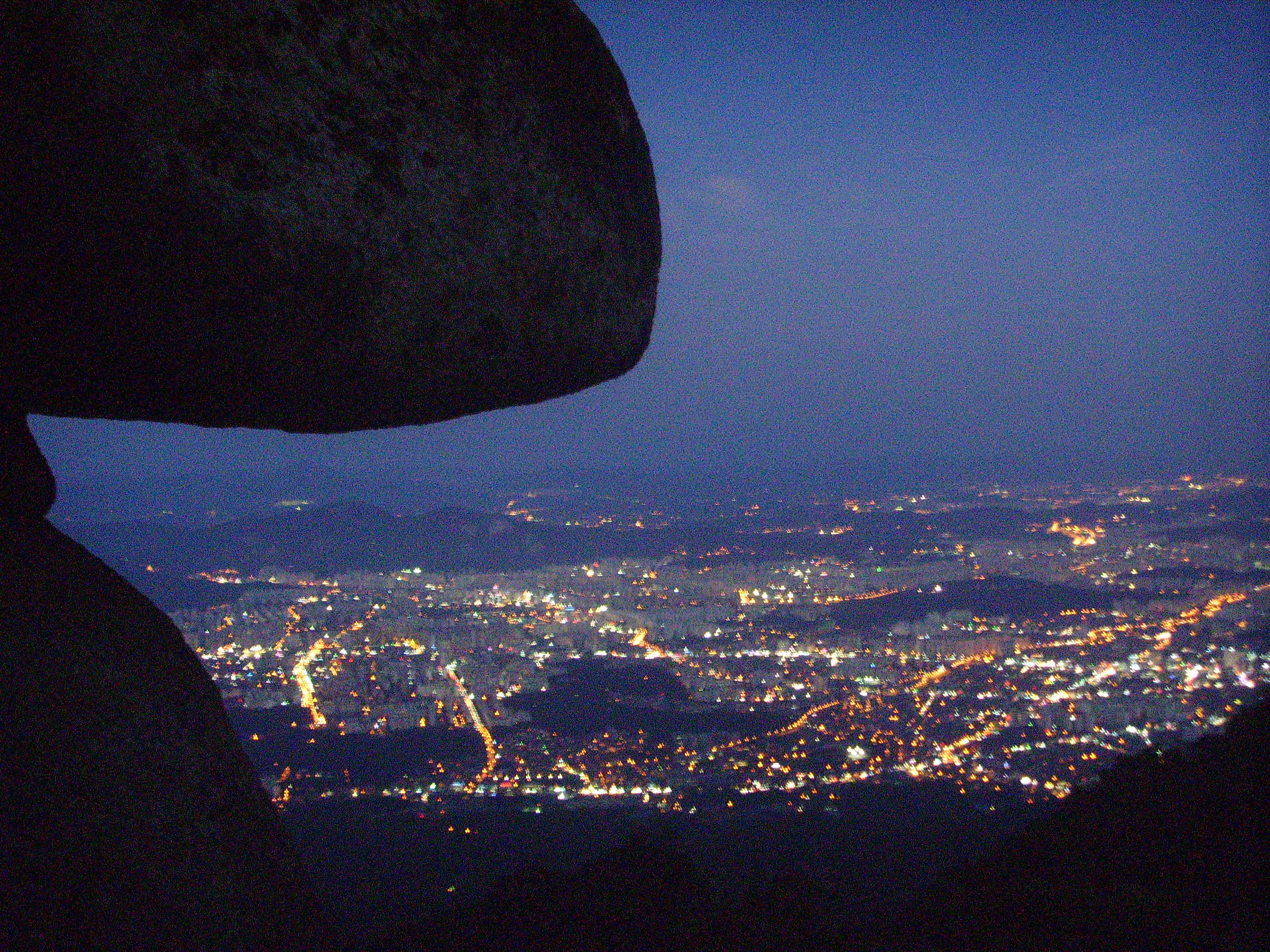
Looking over Seoul at night

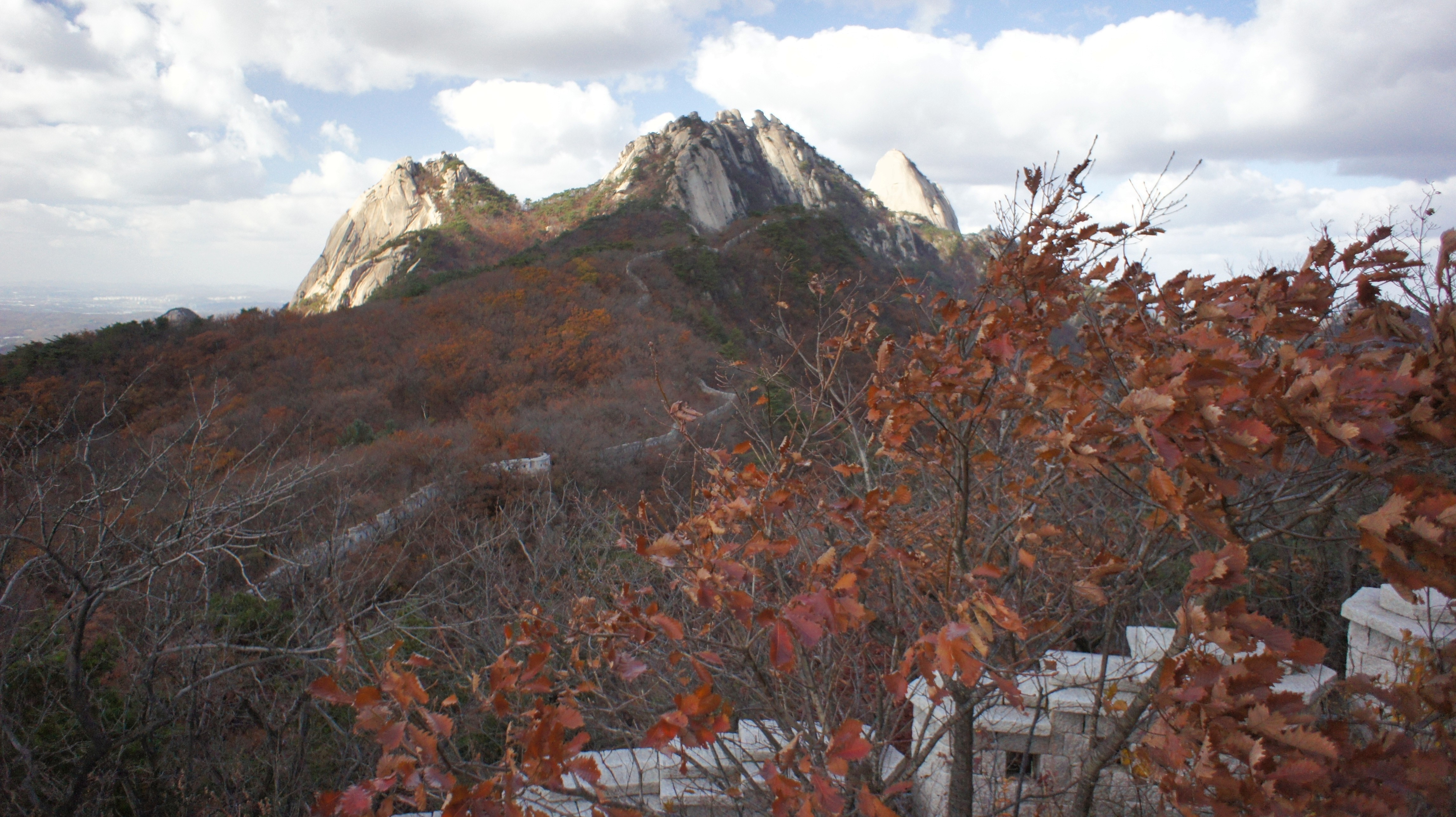
Bukhansan in the fall (2018)

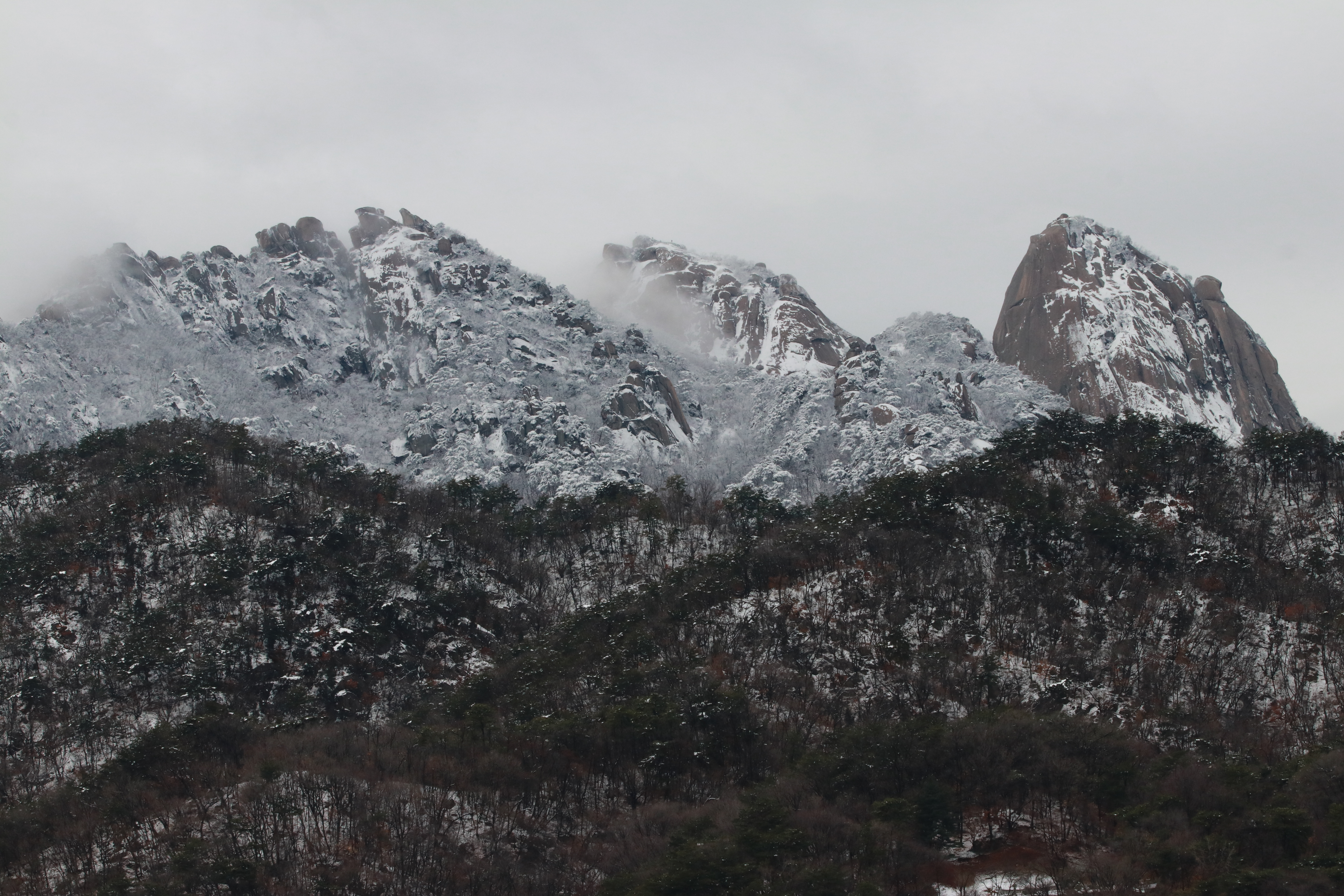
Bukhansan in the winter (2022)

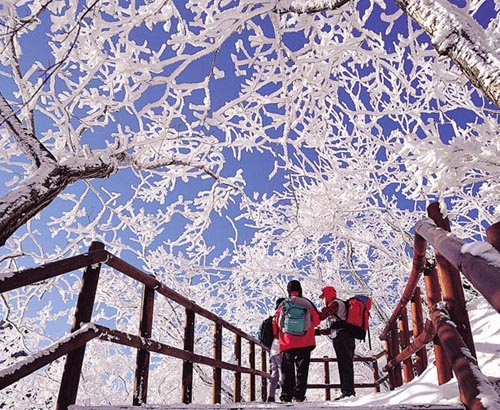
Hiking path covered in snow (2005)

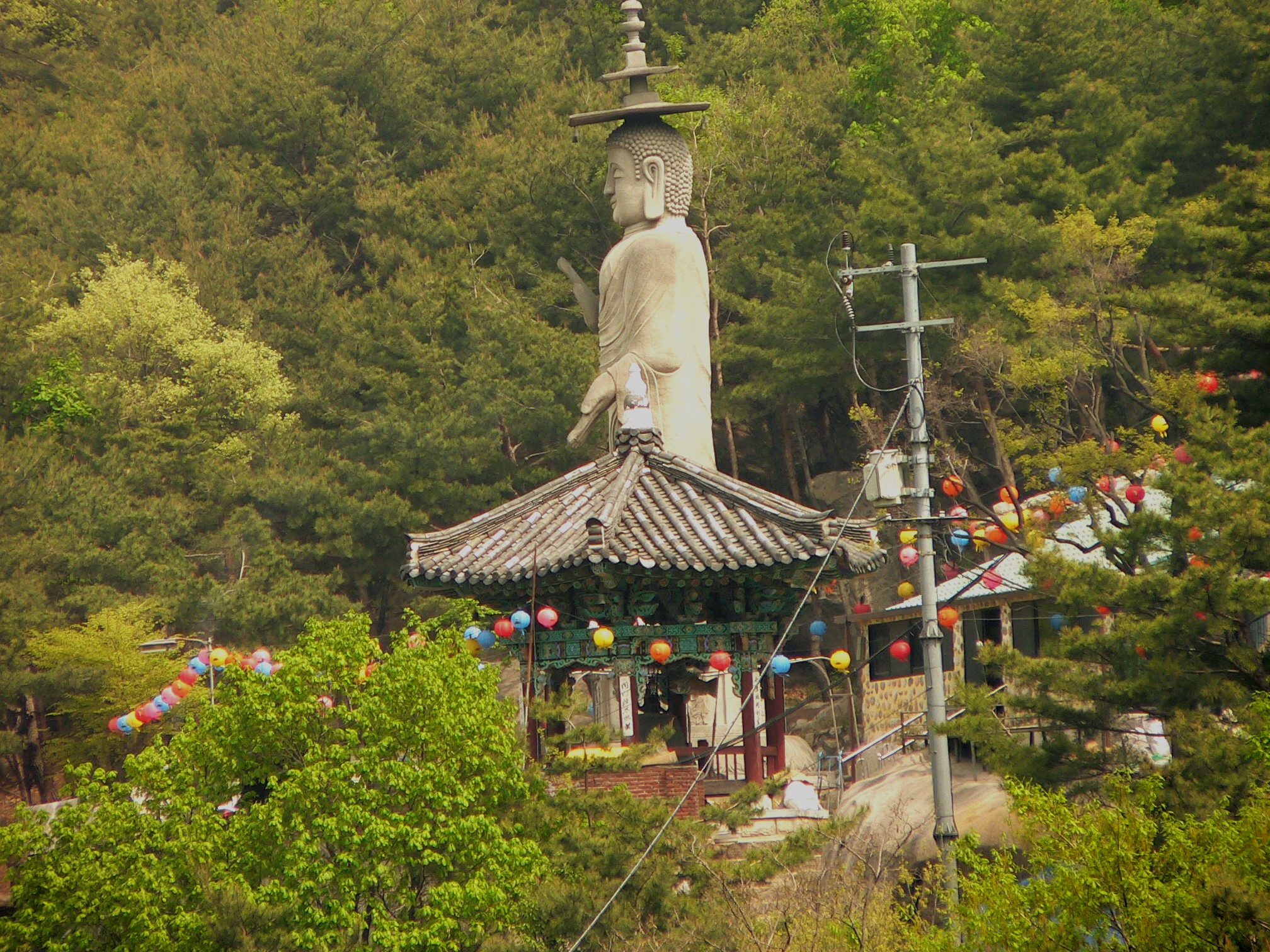
A Buddhist temple on the mountain (2008)

== See also ==
- List of national parks of South Korea
- Tourism in South Korea
- List of fortresses in Korea
