= Bukhansan =

Highest mountain in Seoul, South Korea

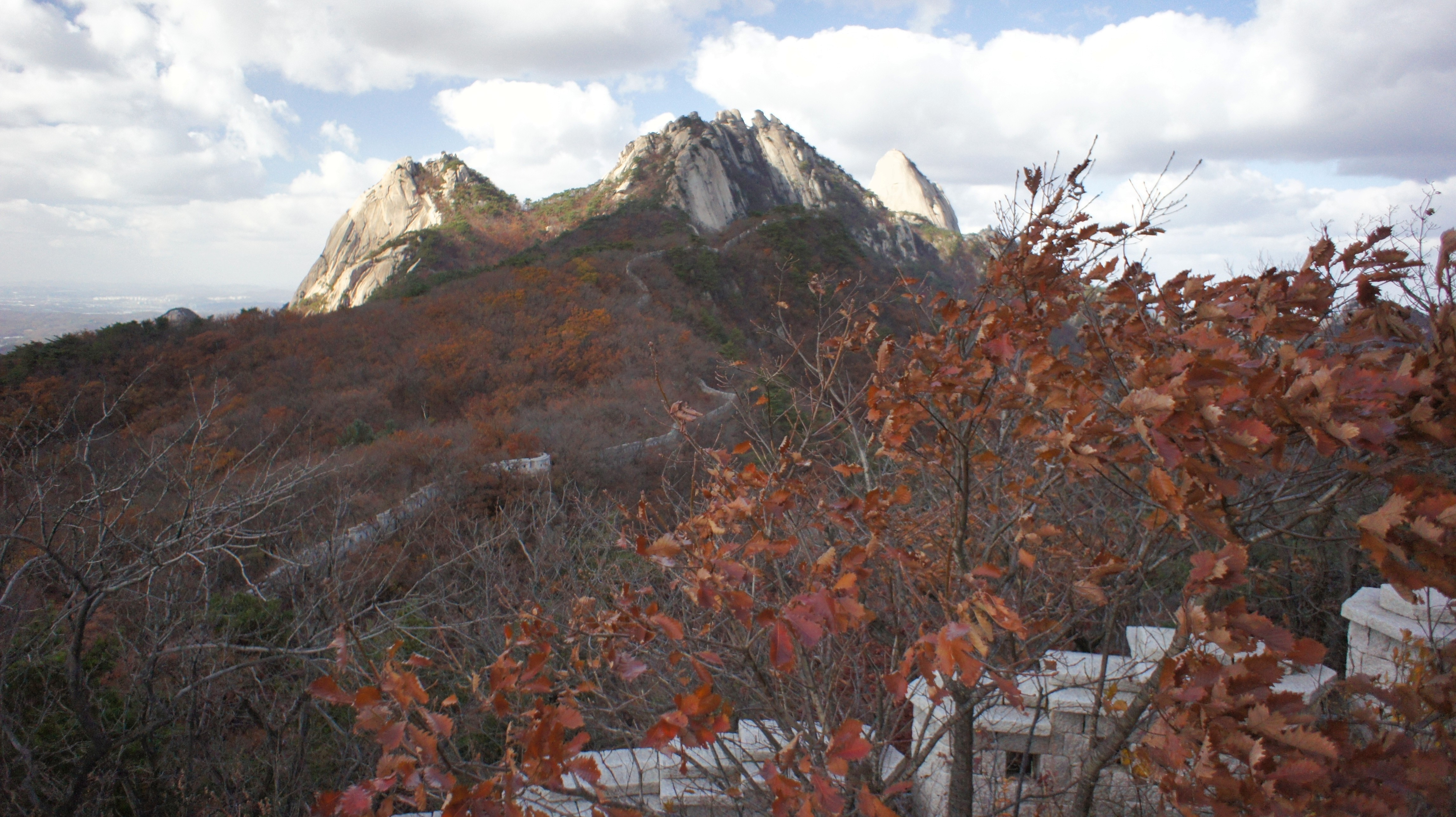
- The three peaks of Bukhansan

Highest point
- Elevation: 836.5 m (2,744 ft)
- Listing: Mountains of Korea
- Coordinates: 37.6608°N 126.9933°E

Geography
- Country: South Korea

Climbing
- Easiest route: from Bukhansan Ui Station (북한산우이) then walk 2.29km to Bukansan National Park Visitor Center (북한산국립공원백운탐방지원센터)

Korean name
- Hangul: 북한산
- Hanja: 北漢山
- RR: Bukhansan
- MR: Pukhansan

Bukhansan (Korean: 북한산, lit. 'North Han Mountain'), alternatively Pukhan-san or Bukhan Mountain, is a mountain on the northern periphery of Seoul, South Korea. There are three major peaks, Baegundae 836.5 meters (2,744 ft), Insubong 810.5 meters (2,659 ft), Mangyeongdae 787.0 meters (2,582.0 ft). Because of its height and the fact that it borders a considerable portion of the city, Bukhansan is a major landmark visible from most city districts. The name "Bukhansan" means "mountain north of Han River", referring to the fact that it is the northern border of the city. During the Joseon era, the peaks marked the extreme northern boundary of Seoul.

Bukhansan is the highest mountain within Seoul boundaries. Apart from Bukhansan, there are seven other mountains including Dobongsan and Suraksan that are over 600 metres high within the city.

Popular throughout the year, Bukhansan, and Bukhansan National Park, which was formed in 1983, are renowned for birdwatching, hiking and rockclimbing. Bukhansan attracts a large number of hikers; around 5 million per year.

== Geology ==
Bukhansan is a representative granite mountain in the Seoul area, primarily composed of Jurassic granite. It was formed by the intrusion of magma into the surrounding Precambrian gneiss during the Mesozoic era, creating its characteristic jagged peaks through differential erosion. The exposed granite domes, such as Insubong, are significant geological features that have made the mountain a world-renowned destination for rock climbing.

== Name ==
Since 2002 there has been a movement to revert the name of Bukhansan to Samgaksan. For many years up until now, the three main peaks of the park have collectively been called "Bukhansan"; however, the original collective name of these three peaks was Samgaksan, meaning "three-horned mountain." The head of the Gangbuk-gu District Office in Seoul is leading a petition to have the central government change the name back to the original.

== Gallery ==
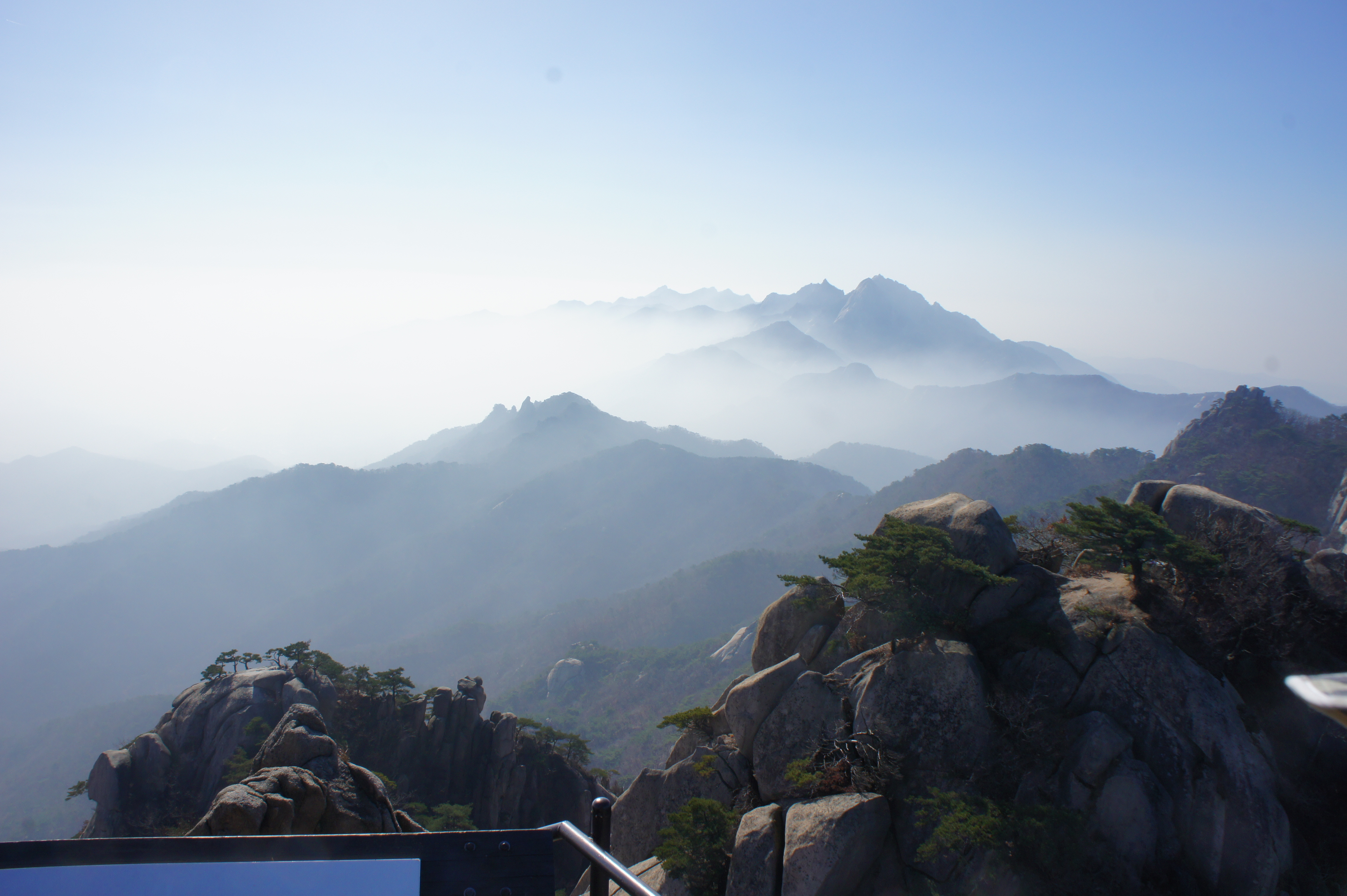

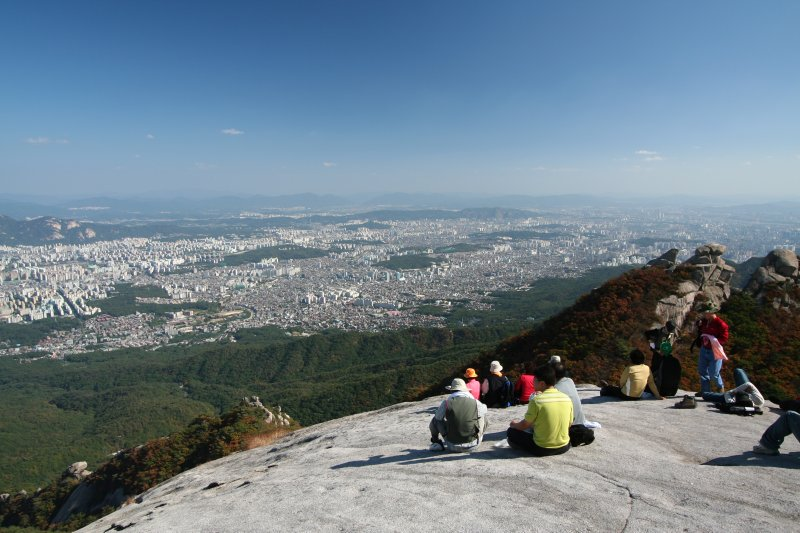

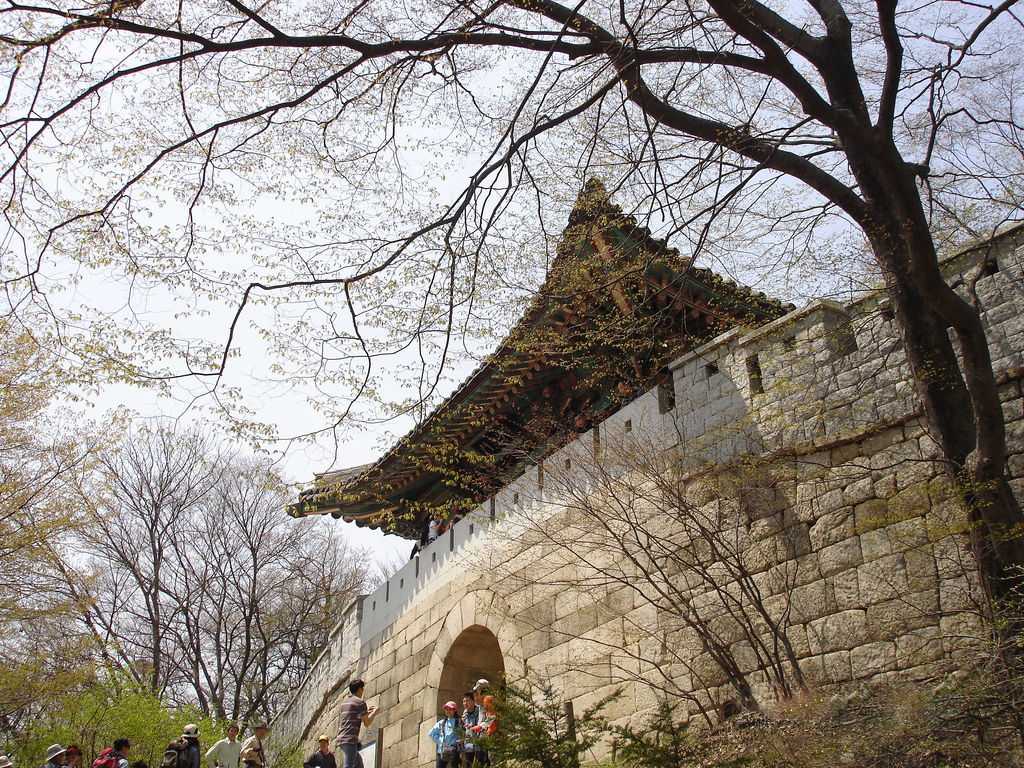

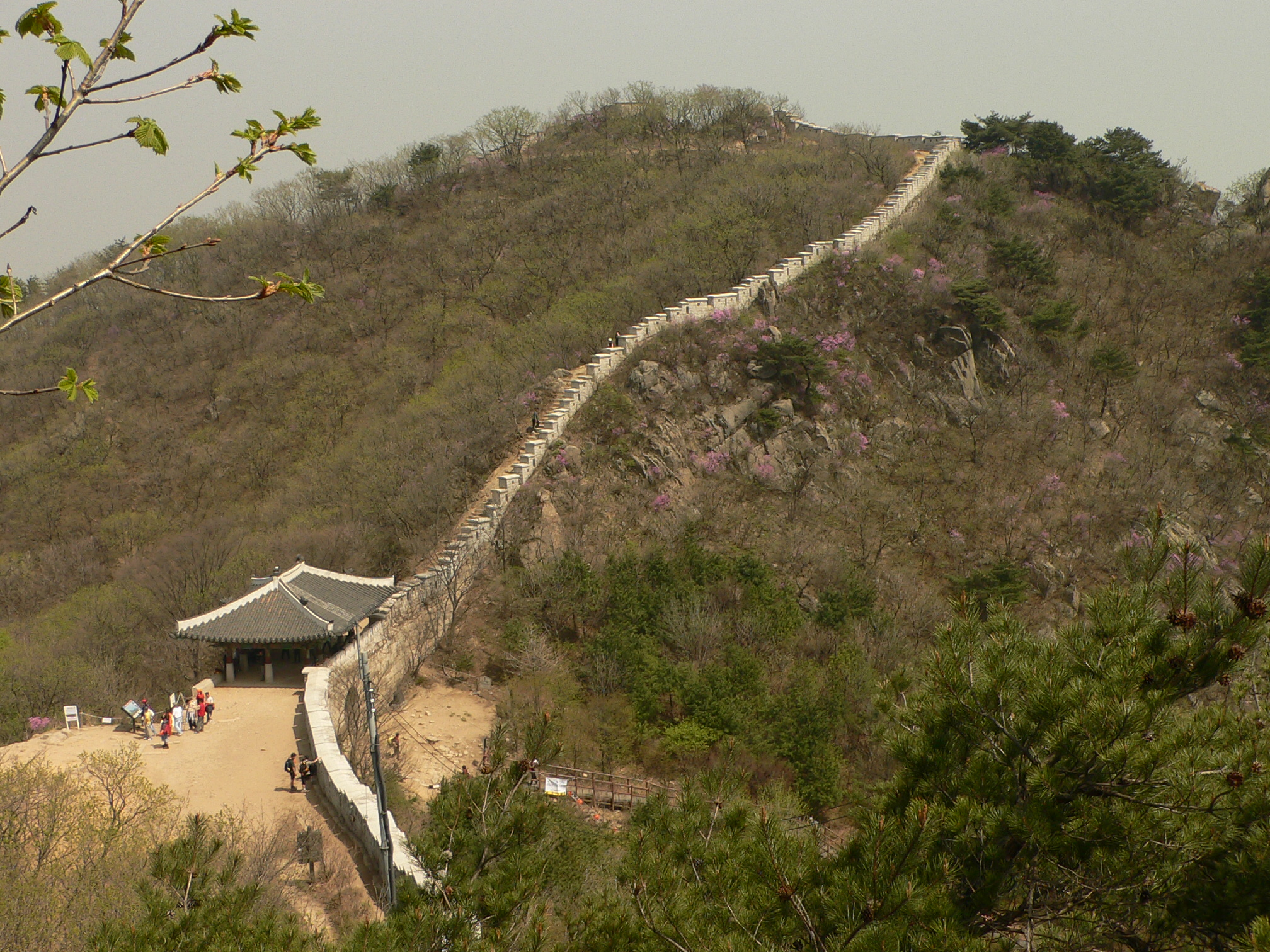

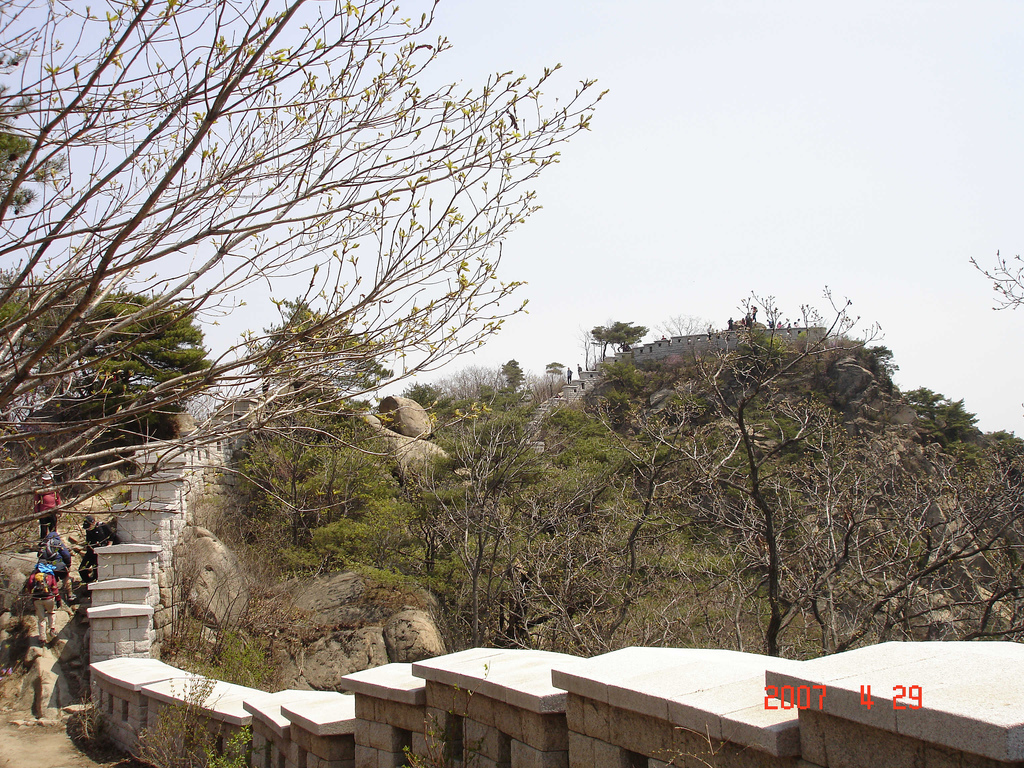

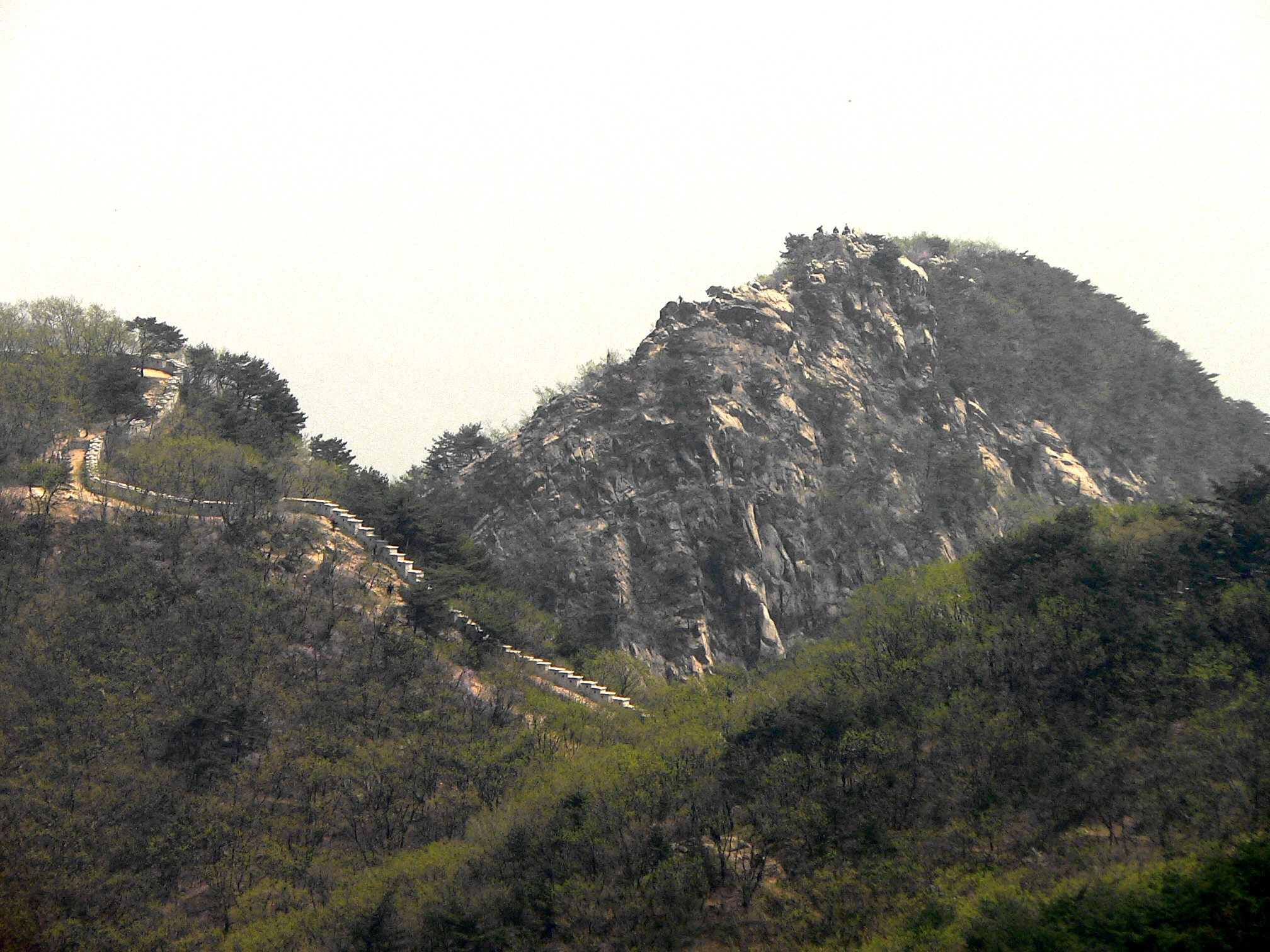

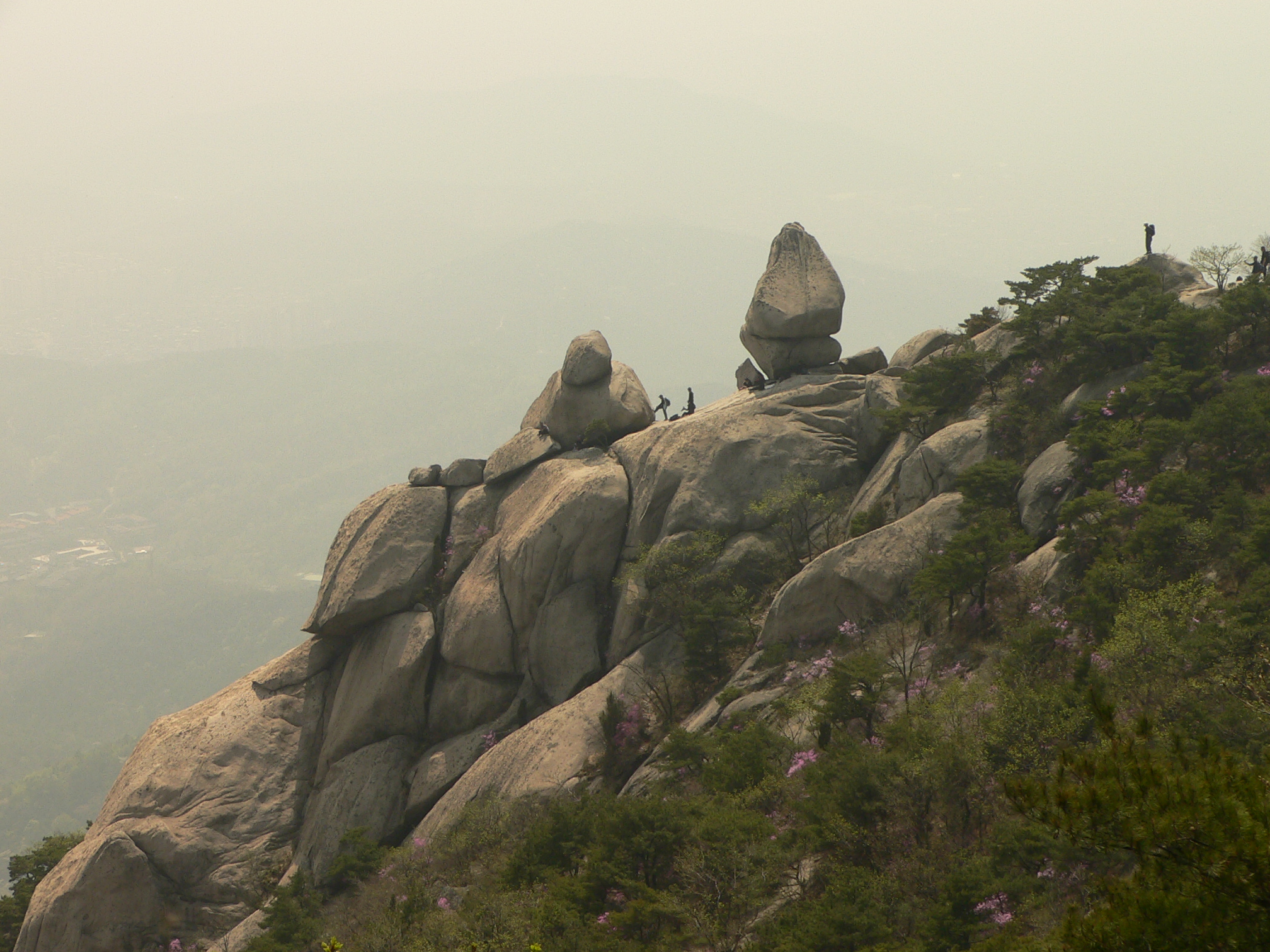

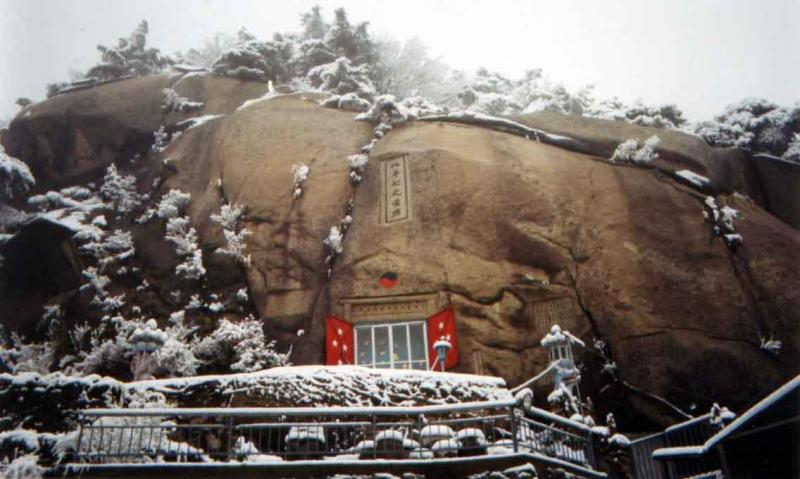
A shrine in Bukhansan

== Films and literature ==
Daum webtoon manhwa PEAK by author Hong Sun-soo and artist Im Gak-hyuck is a fictional work based on the mountain rescue team working in this mountain.
