= Command of the Northern Approaches =

1624–1884 Korean military camp

- Coat of Arms of Joseon
- Active: 1624
- Disbanded: 1884
- Country: (Korea) Joseon
- Allegiance: (Korea) King of Joseon
- Branch: Joseon Army
- Type: Capital Guard
- Role: Garrison Army
- Size: 23,500
- Part of: Five Army Camps
- Garrison/HQ: Bukhansanseong

Insignia
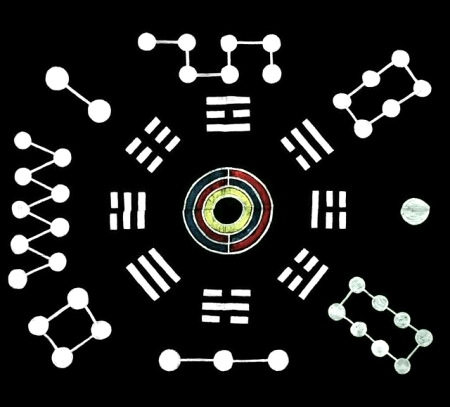
- Ensign

Korean name
- Hangul: 총융청
- Hanja: 摠戎廳
- RR: Chongyungcheong
- MR: Ch'ongyungch'ŏng

The Command of the Northern Approaches (Korean: 총융청; Hanja: 摠戎廳) was a military camp established during the late Joseon Dynasty in order to strengthen the defense of the outskirts of Hanseong through the Bukhansanseong Fortress. The Command of the Northern Approaches was established to strengthen the authority of the Seoin faction, which accompanied the king and princess and provided security after the Injo Coup. It also organized the local military and defense forces in Gyeonggi Province into a unified command structure.

== Establishment ==
The Command of the Northern Approaches was established in 1624 (the 2nd year of King Injo of Joseon's reign) due to the need for defense in the outskirts of the capital following Yi Gwal's Rebellion and the deteriorating relationship with the Later Jin Dynasty. The installation of the Command of the Northern Approaches system was prompted by the vulnerability revealed when the rebel forces easily penetrated the defensive line in the outskirts of Gyeonggi Province and occupied Seoul the following year. When the Command of the Northern Approaches was initially established, a military camp was set up in Bukiyeong (North Second Camp) in Sajik-dong.

Although the rebellion was suppressed, both domestic and external difficulties increased. This vulnerability highlighted not only the relationship with Later Jin but also the weakness of royal authority as King Injo was forced to flee to Gongju due to Yi Gwal's pursuit. To address this vulnerability, the Chongyunggun, focused on defending royal authority, was established, strengthening the existing army called the Eoyeonggun and organizing the Chongyunggun centered around the Sokeogun in Gyeonggi Province. Lee Seo, the Gyeonggi governor at the time, was appointed as the responsible official and given the title of Gibojongyungsa (畿輔摠戎使). In June of the second year, his title was changed to Chongyunggun Gibojongyungsa, and the region under his jurisdiction, Gyeonggi Province, became known as the Chongyunggun for the first time.

However, in 1669 (the 10th year of King Hyunjong's reign), it was relocated to Samcheong-dong and in 1747 (the 23rd year of King Yeongjo's reign), it was further moved to Yeonyungdae to manage Bukhansanseong, taking charge of the defense of the northern outskirts of the capital in Gyeonggi Province.

== Organization ==
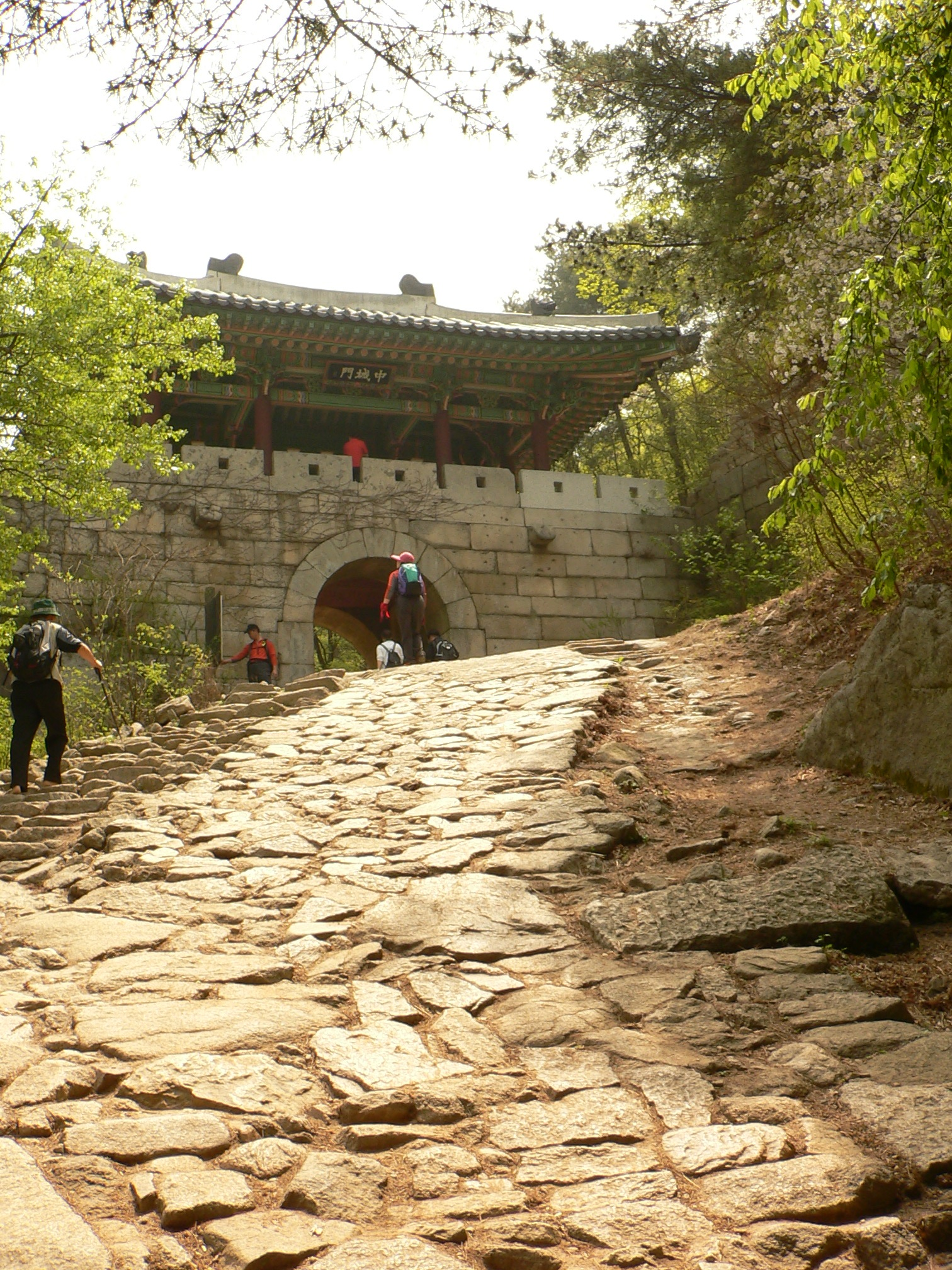
A gate in Bukhansan, mountain located on the north side of Seoul, South Korea.

Initially, the total strength of the Chongyung forces, which included the local military, defense forces, and detached cavalry, amounted to about 20,000 personnel. The Chongyunggun was organized with various troops, including the Jeonggun (正軍), Sokogun (束伍軍), and Byeoldaemagun (別隊馬軍), in Gyeonggi Province.

The internal organizational structure consists of 2bu (divisions) = 6sa (brigades) = 26cho (regiments) (壯抄 10cho, 牙兵 10cho, 屯牙兵 3cho, 屯壯抄牙兵 3cho), with 1 officer assigned to each cho, 1 officer for the central army, 2 officers for Cheonchong, 6 officers for Pachong, and 26 officers for Chogwan, forming the basic composition. Notably, there are Dunchong and Dunabyeong, which cannot be found in other military camps, indicating that they may be the rear guards of the Chongyungsa, the central military headquarters. Therefore, even in the "Sokdaejeon," it is sometimes described as only 4sa (Pachong 4 officers) = 20cho (Chogwan 20 officers) alone.

=== Commander ===
The commander (Chongyungsa) was an officer position in charge of the Command. Yi Seo (李曙) became the first commander. He concurrently held the position of Dang Sang of the Bibyeonsa (the Ministry of Personnel Affairs) on a regular basis. In 1750 (the 26th year of King Yeongjo's reign), it was combined with the Gyeonggi Army, but was abolished in 1760. In 1764, it concurrently held the position of Jojiseojejo (the Chief of Paper Manufacturing Bureau) on a regular basis. The principal officer oversaw the selection of soldiers for the Byungjo Ilgunsaek (one army color) and was responsible for the rotational training of the five commands: Suwon, Gwangju (廣州), Yangju, Jangdan, and Namyang. Under the Chongyungsa, there were one Zhongjun (中軍), two Chonchong (千摠), six Pachong (把摠), twenty-six Chogwan (哨官), five Gungwan (軍官), seventeen Gyoryeongwan (敎鍊官), and other positions such as Bujang (部將). The headquarters (職廳) were located outside Changuimun Gate (彰義門).

=== Composition ===
These internal troops were divided into three armies from October 15 to the following year's October 15th, with each army rotating its assigned positions every four cho. However, when they were not on duty, civilian soldiers had to pay 6 du, while slave soldiers had to pay 3 du. Additionally, based on the assigned names like Chochong, it seems that they were selected from among the conscripts and had to offer their share of jebeonmi if they were assigned military duties. Besides the basic organizational structure, the Naeyoung also had training officers, military officers, and supervisory officers, similar to other military camps. It included officers for leisure activities (Kanryanggungwan, Zaijagungwan) and had 995 civilian soldiers responsible for miscellaneous tasks.

In addition, there were "良軍需保" (good military suppliers) and "奴軍需保" (slave military suppliers). Each of them paid 6 du as a contribution. There were also many "吹鐵牙兵" (blowing iron soldiers) and numerous "둔전" (guards) belonging to the Chongyungsa. Therefore, the Chongyungsa was operated not by the national treasury but by its own procurement expenses. Most of the troops were composed of local militias or private armies from the region, defending Seoul from internal and external threats.

=== Systems ===
On the other hand, during the early stages when the Naeyoung system was not fully established, the external military camps operated under the 7-yeongje or 5-yeongje system without clear divisions. However, with the establishment of the internal and external military camp system, the Naeyoung adopted the Yangbu system, divided into left and right sections, while the external camps followed the 3-yeongje system. In particular, the outer regions of Gyeonggi Province, including Suwon and Yangju, experienced several changes in the jurisdiction of military officers due to the dynamics between the camps. However, around the 13th year of King Sukjong's reign (1687), the 3-yeongje system was firmly established. According to the "Mangiyoram," it states, "In the 13th year of Sukjong's reign, at the request of Suocheong, Namyang was moved to Nampo, and only Suwon, Changnyeon, and Yangju were established." This 3-yeongje system is also recorded in the "Mangiyoram," stating that in the 15th year of Sukjong's reign, Yangju was renamed as Paju, but during the military reorganization in the 30th year of Sukjong's reign, it was changed to Jangdan, suggesting that Paju Daejeong came after that.

Thus, the old military system of the 2nd division (internal camp) and the three-camp system (external camp) was reorganized into a three-camp system in the 30th year of King Sukjong's reign (1704), and the internal camp was abolished. The central camp became the 3rd division, and the left and right camps became two divisions each. Each division had two units, and each unit had five seconds, resulting in a total of 15,181 regular soldiers. The remaining military personnel and newcomers were designated as military suppliers, and the yangin had to pay 12 du (6 du after the Junic System was implemented), while the nogun had to pay 6 du. This brought the total number of troops to 23,157, completing the military camp system. Based on this, it seems that the internal camp system was merged into the three-camp system. However, the organization of the internal camp system is still intact within the military system of the Chongyungsa, indicating that the Chongyungsa itself, although conceptual, still maintained the internal camp system (本廳) and the external camp system (屬營) in the form of the 2nd and 3rd divisions.

=== Division ===
The initial organization of the military in Gyeonggi Province consisted of five divisions: Suwon, Gwangju, Yangju, Changpum, and Namyang, with three units in each camp, three companies in each unit, and three squads in each company, totaling about 20,000 soldiers. In November of the second year of King Injo's reign (1624), it was reorganized according to the score system described in General Cheokgyegwang's "Ryeonbyeongshilgi" (練兵實記), with seven camps, twelve units, twenty-five companies, and 123 squads, to defend the outskirts of the capital.

However, after the Qing invasion of Joseon, conscription by the Qing Dynasty was conducted in the Eoyeonggun, the Royal Army, resulting in weakened defense capabilities. To strengthen this weakened defense, the Command of the Northern Approaches underwent a transformation into the Nei-Waiying system. In the twenty-fourth year of King Injo's reign, Chongyungsa Gwiryeon was appointed to select ten soldiers from the Command of the Northern Approaches as the Zhuangchaojun (壯抄軍) and three soldiers as the Tunzhuangchao (屯壯抄), who would be stationed in the capital for three months during winter to perform duties related to palace security. To reinforce the northern forces, in 1644, Gu In-gi, the Chongyung Commander, selected 10 units of Jangcho (將抄軍) and 3 units of Dunjangcho (屯將抄) to station in the capital for three months during the winter, assuming the task of guarding the royal palace perimeter.

In the reign of King Sukjong, ten soldiers known as Yabing (牙兵) were stationed in the Bonting (本廳) located in Samcheong-dong, and three soldiers selected from the local population were added, establishing the Inner Unit system within the Chongyungcheong. From this point on, the Chongyungcheong adopted a structure with two inner units (Neiying) and three outer units (Waiying). In 1674 (the coronation year of King Sukjong), 10 units of Ayong (牙兵) and 3 units of Dunayong (屯牙兵) were added as subordinate troops to the Chongyung Command, and the Inner and Outer Military System (內營制) was established. Thus, the Chongyung forces were organized into two divisions, the Inner Forces and the Outer Forces, as shown in the diagram. Each division and unit had training officers, such as the Zhigugwan (知穀官) and Gipaegwan (旗牌官), and when Suwon was promoted to Yusubu, the Central Forces were relocated to Paju.

In 1750 (the 26th year of King Yeongjo's reign), due to financial constraints, the Command of the Northern Approaches was combined with the Gyeonggi Army, and the headquarters were established in Bukhansanseong in the form of a military expedition. In 1757, the Kyengrichong (Administration Bureau) that managed Bukhansanseong was transferred to the Chongyung Command, which became responsible for the defense of the northern outskirts of Gyeonggi Province centered around Bukhansanseong. In the 26th year of King Yeongjo's reign (1780), the Chongyungsa was temporarily merged with the Gyeongibyungsa due to financial constraints. They were sent to the Bukhansanseong fortress. However, in the 36th year, it was restored to the previous system, and for a brief period in the 40th year, it changed to a five-division system.

In the 11th year of King Jeongjo's reign (1787), it reverted to the three-division system. At that time, the "마" (cavalry) and "보" (infantry) divisions, which were organized into 83 units, were reduced to a total of 43 units, consisting of 12 units of infantry (束伍步軍) with 2 units per division, 6 units of "別騎士" (renamed cavalry from the previous system), and 1 unit of "欄後軍" (rear guard) assigned to the central division, according to the "Mangiyoram." The Chongyung system was temporarily restored to the two-division, three-district structure, but after 1792 (the 16th year of King Jeongjo's reign), the Inner and Outer Military System was maintained, avoiding the Inner Forces system. However, while the Chongyung forces numbered 83 units during the reign of King Yeongjo, it was significantly reduced to 43 units during the reign of King Jeongjo. After 1793, as part of King Jeongjo's efforts to strengthen royal authority, the Jangyong Outer Forces centered around Hwaseong were established, and all Chongyung forces were incorporated into it.

== Duties ==
The primary role of the Command of the Northern Approaches was not to directly defend the capital and protect the king, but rather to indirectly contribute to the defense of the capital by guarding the outskirts against the Later Jin. To reinforce the Chongyung forces, the government attracted farmers to settle in the villages of each division and extensively cultivated farmland to secure military provisions. The forces operated under a self-sustaining system where they provided their own provisions and were paid with boin (保人) certificates according to the military rank system. In 1624 (the second year of King Injo's reign), Namhansanseong Fortress was reconstructed, and subsequently, the Suocheong (Command Headquarters) was established, gradually dividing the defense of the Gyeonggi area between Namhansanseong and Suocheong. After the Manchu invasion in 1636, conscription by the Qing Dynasty mainly targeted the Seoin faction.

However, with the establishment of the Suwonseong (Suwon Fortress) in the fourth year of King Injo's reign, the defense of the southern part of Gyeonggi Province gradually shifted to the Suwonseong. Therefore, it is evident that the Chongyungsa, which had been responsible for overseeing the entire Gyeonggi Province until the resignation of Lee Seo in the twelfth year of King Injo's reign, exercised supervision over the Suwonseong. During the reign of King Hyojong, the Suwonseong became a military camp, and the northern part of the capital came under the responsibility of the Command of the Northern Approaches centered around the Bukhansanseong, while the southern part came under the jurisdiction of the Suwonseong.

== Dissolution ==
During the early reign of King Sunjo of Joseon, the Jangyong forces were abolished. The Command of the Northern Approaches existed until the 19th century, renamed as Chongwiyeong (총위영) in 1846 (during the reign of King Heonjong, 헌종 12), but restored to its original name in 1849 (during the reign of King Cheoljong). In 1882 (during the reign of King Gojong, 고종 19), the Chingunyeongje (親軍營制) was introduced, and the Chongyungcheong, Oyeongcheong (御營廳), and Geumwiyeong (禁衛營) were integrated into the Jangeoyeong (壯禦營), but later returned to the system of five military camps. They regained their function temporarily before being disbanded in 1884 (the 21st year of King Gojong's reign) when the Chingunyeong (Capital Guard Command) system was established.

== See also ==
- Joseon Army
- Five Army Camps
- Bukhansanseong
