= Dobongsan =

Mountain in South Korea

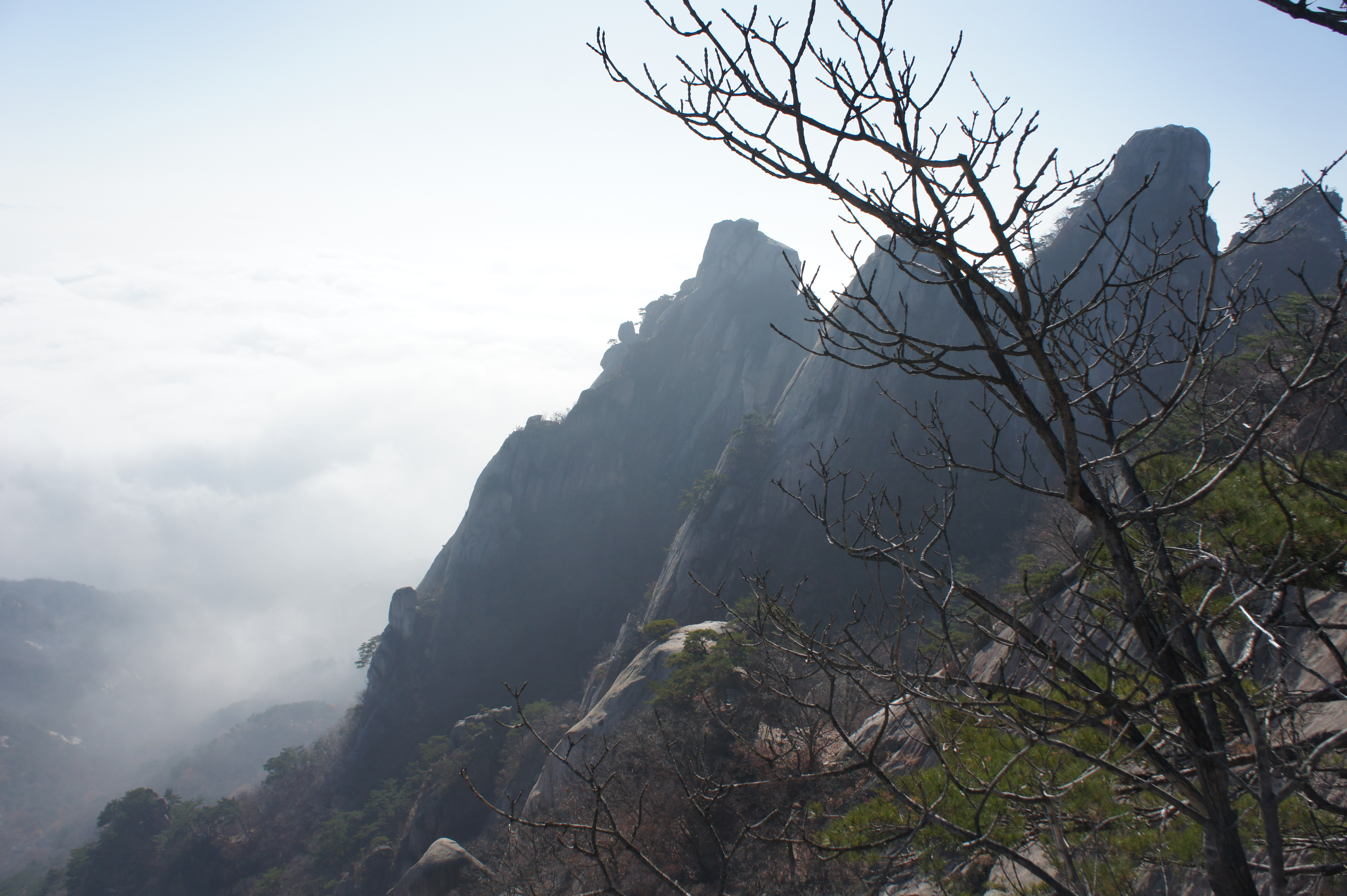
- Mount Dobongsan peaks Seoninbong (708 m), Manjangbong (718 m), Jaunbong (740 m) and Shinseondae (730 m) taken from trail leading to summit.

Highest point
- Elevation: 739.5 m (2,426 ft)
- Coordinates: 37°41′54.73″N 127°0′53.88″E

Geography
- Location: Bukhansan National Park, South Korea

Climbing
- Easiest route: Dobongsan Station

Korean name
- Hangul: 도봉산
- Hanja: 道峰山
- RR: Dobongsan
- MR: Tobongsan

Dobongsan (Korean: 도봉산) is a mountain in Bukhansan National Park, South Korea. It extends across Seoul, the national capital, and the cities of Yangju and Uijeongbu, in the province of Gyeonggi Province. It has an elevation of 739.5 m (2,426 ft). Nearby Dobongsan Station is named after it.

It is known for the magnificent rock formations of the Manjangbong, Seoninbong, Jubong, Obong and Uiambong Peaks. The Seoninbong summit has 37 hiking courses connecting to it, including the famous Bakjwi (Bat) Course. The mountain is also home to Cheonchuksa Buddhist Temple, the oldest temple in the region, and several other temples including Mangwolsa, Wonhyosa and Hoeryongsa, as well as a number of beautiful valleys called Donong, Songchu, Obong and Yeongeocheon. Furthermore, it is easily accessible by public transportation.

== Gallery ==
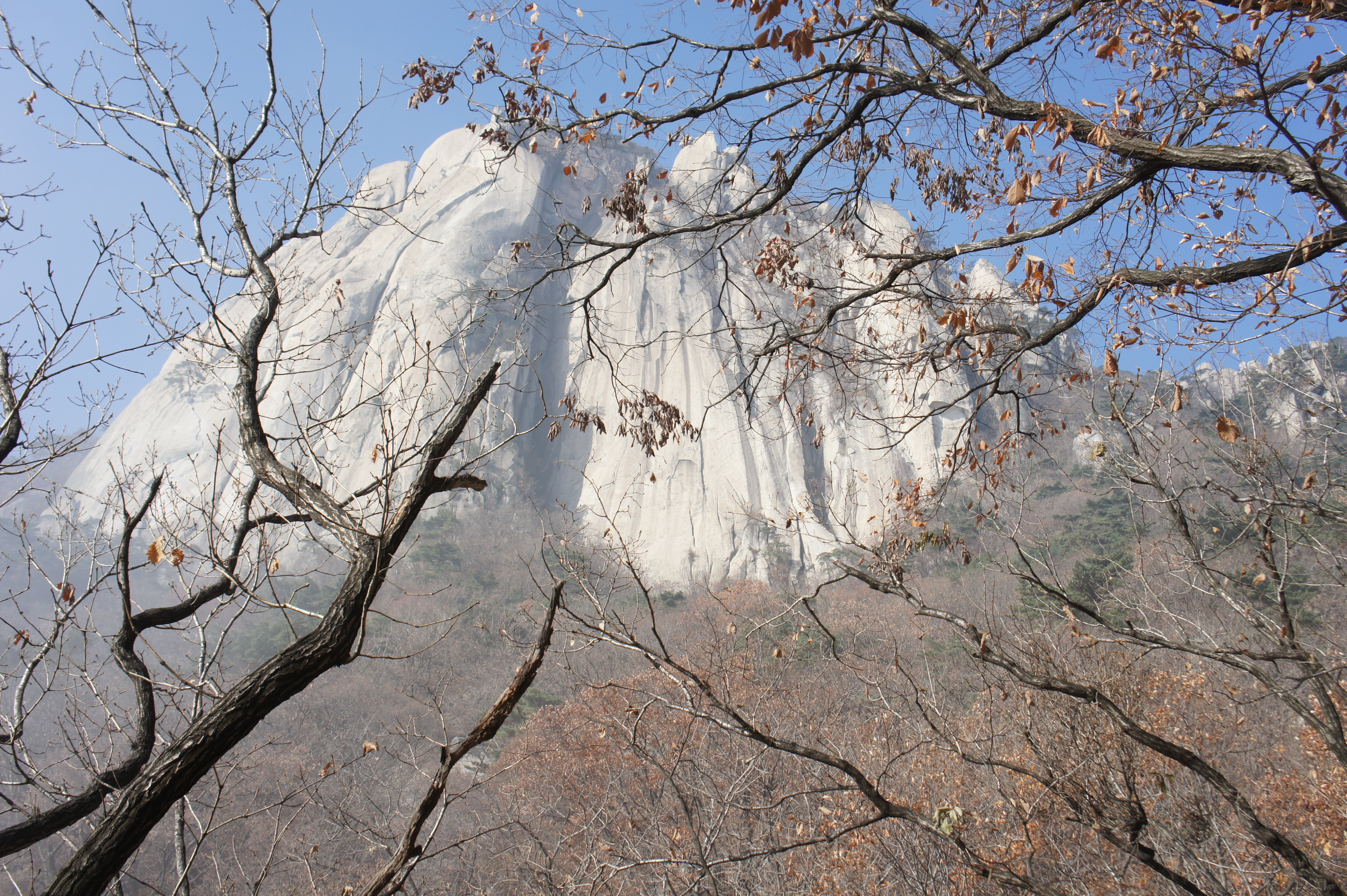
East face of Seoninbong Peak, Dobongsan taken from the trail leading to Manworam Temple.

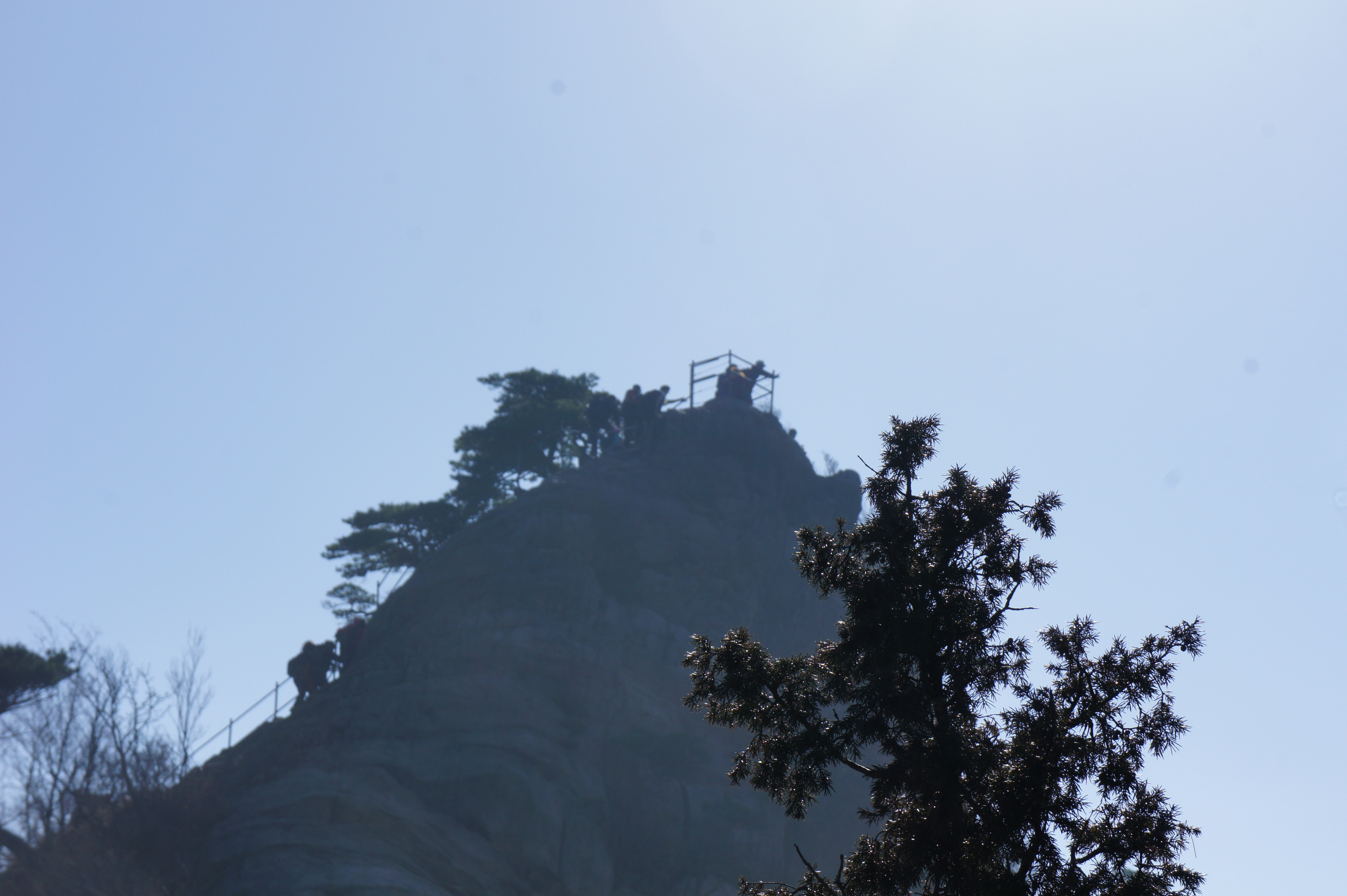
Observation area on a peak of Dobongsan.

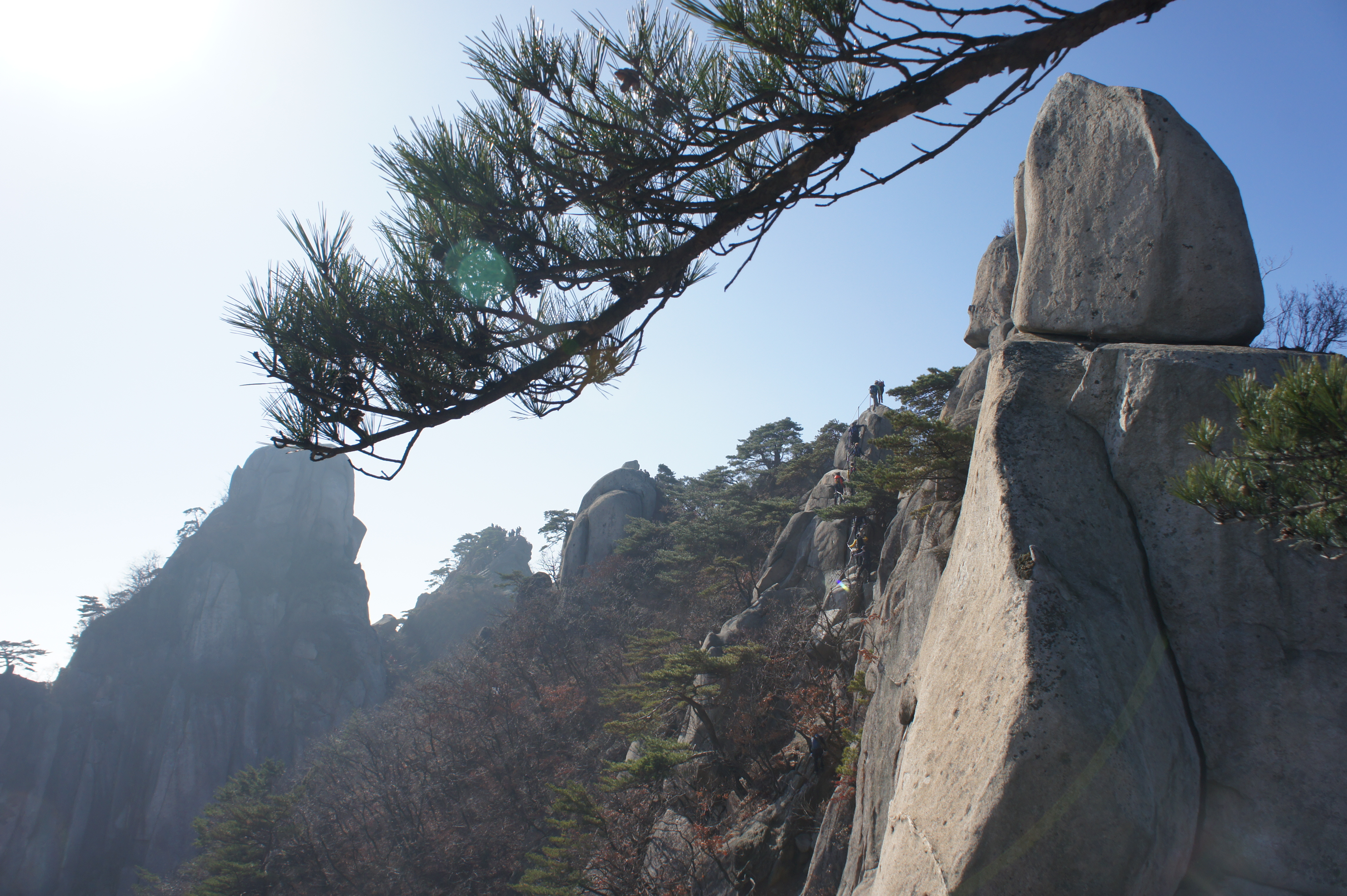
Rugged trail leading to peak of Dobongsan.

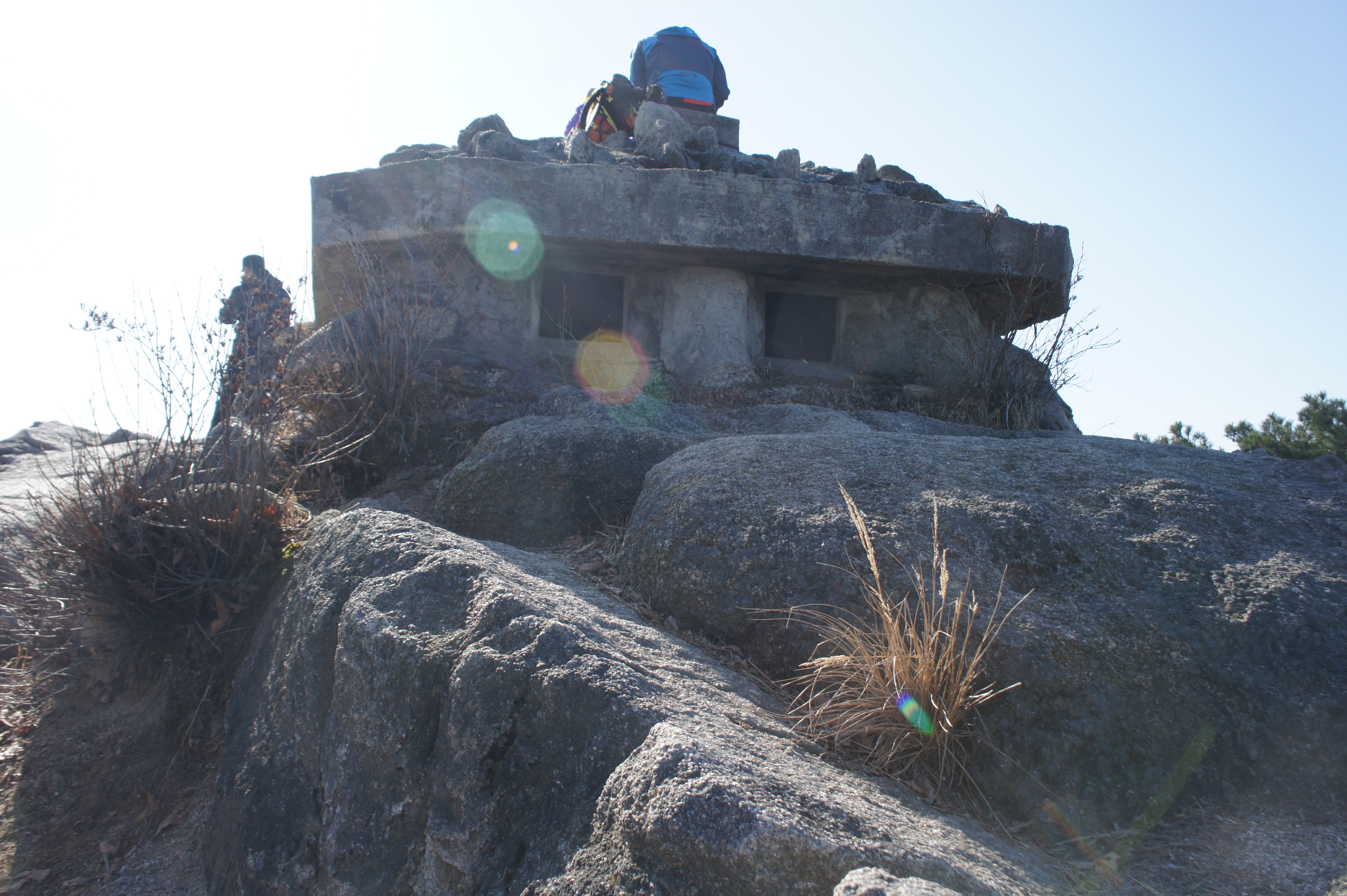
Wartime bunker on Dobongsan summit trail in Korea.

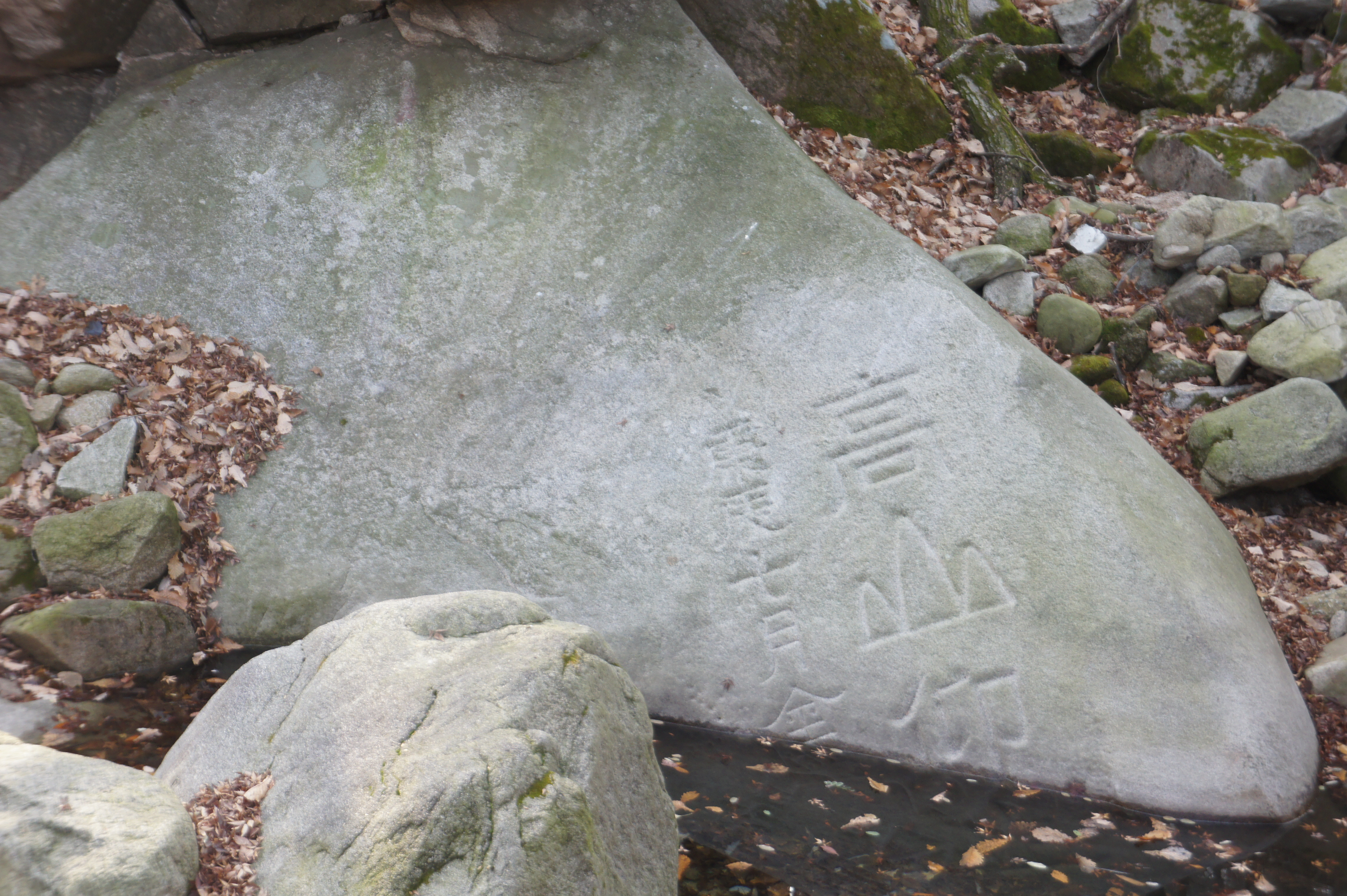
Petroglyph in stream bed at the foot of Dobongsan.

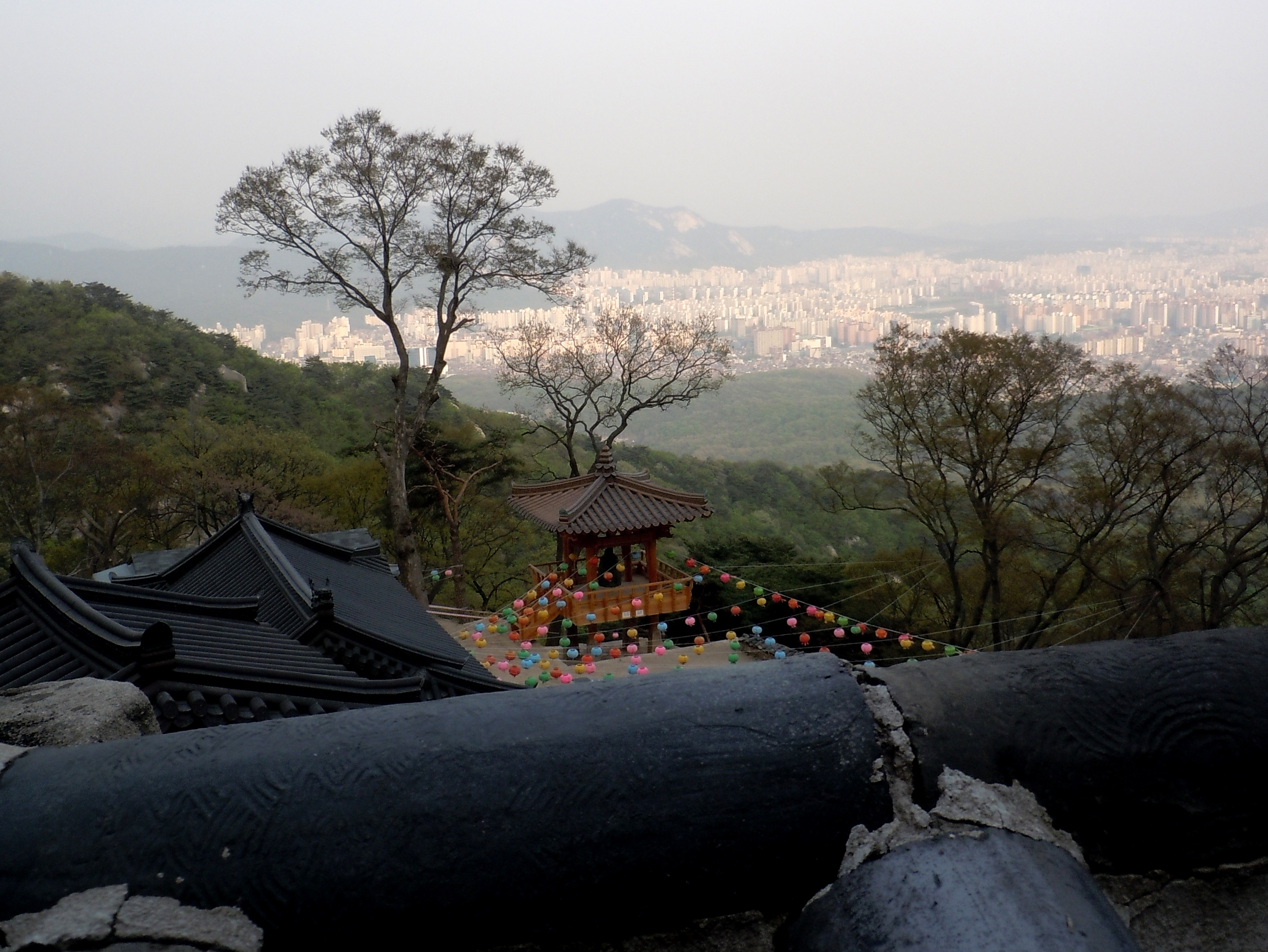
Temple on Dobongsan

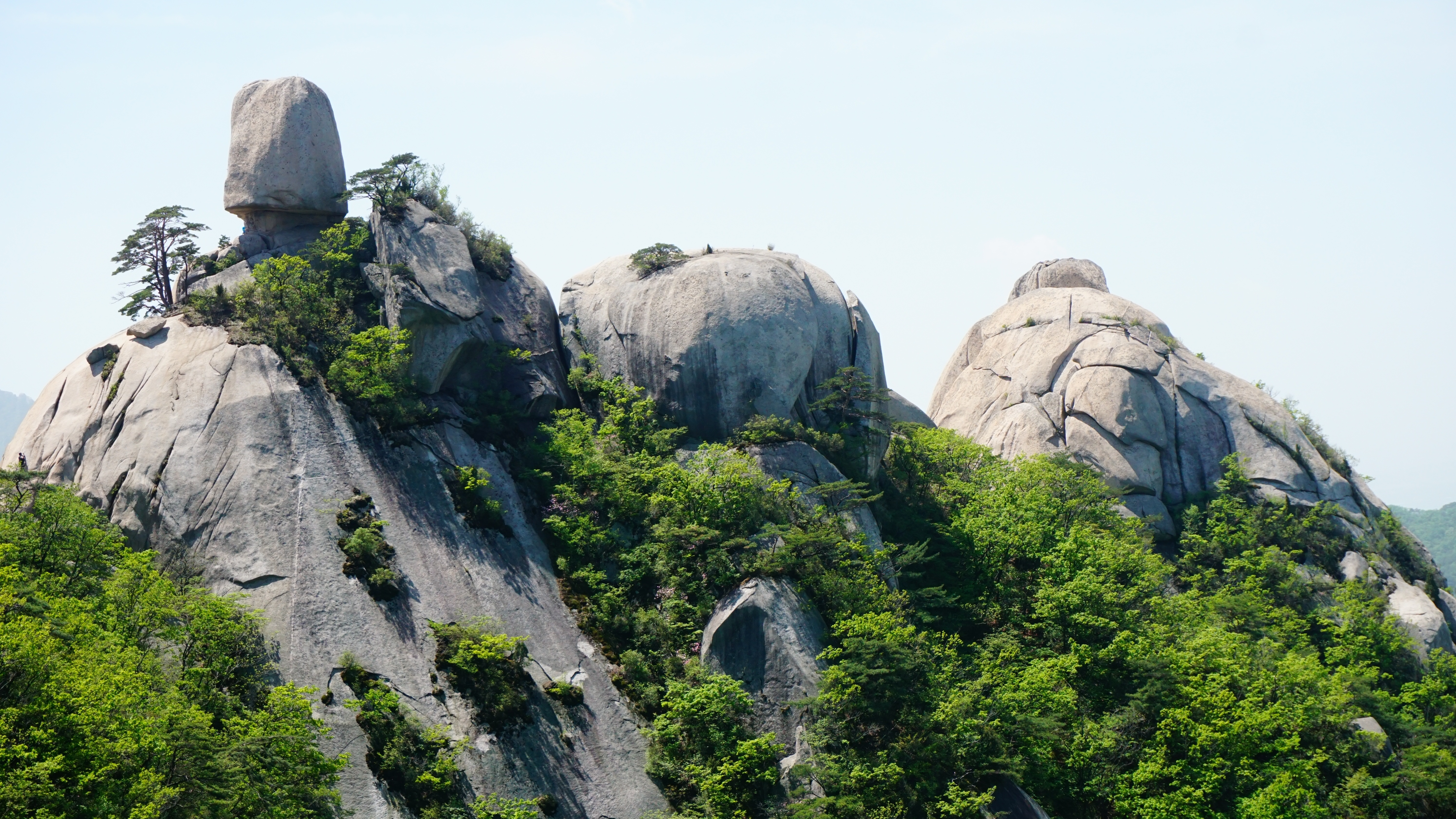
Obong

== See also ==
- List of mountains in Seoul
- List of mountains in Korea
