= Bukhansanseong =

Mountain fortress in South Korea

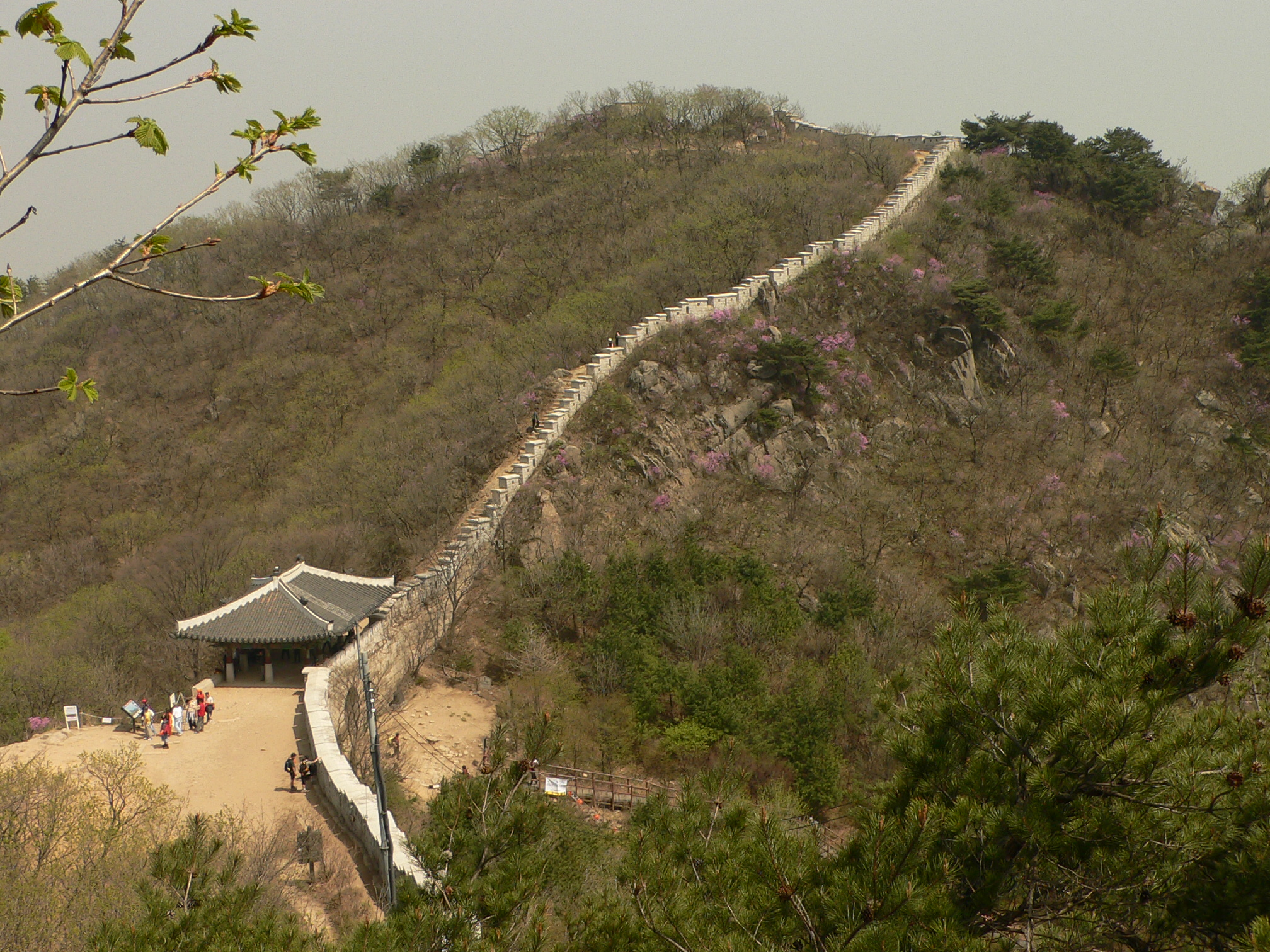
- Part of the fortress wall (2005)
- Interactive map of Bukhansanseong
- Type: Korean fortress
- Location: Bukhansan National Park, South Korea
- Coordinates: 37.6451°N 126.9845°E
- Built: 1711
- Built by: Sukjong of Joseon

Historic Sites of South Korea
- Official name: Bukhansanseong Fortress
- Designated: 1968-12-05
- Reference no.: 162

Korean name
- Hangul: 북한산성
- Hanja: 北漢山城
- RR: Bukhansanseong
- MR: Pukhansansŏng

Bukhansanseong (Korean: 북한산성; Hanja: 北漢山城) is a Joseon-era Korean fortress in Bukhansan National Park, South Korea. The present fort was completed in 1711, though plans for the structure date back to 1659. The name is also given to a fortress mentioned in the Samguk sagi, constructed by Gaeru of Baekje in 132 CE, and the two are often conflated although the putative connection is contested.

The modern Bukhansanseong was built to protect the approach to Seoul, filling a gap in Korea's defences that had become apparent during the second Manchu invasion of 1636 and the earlier Imjin War. The Bukhansanseong was used as a royal retreat in emergencies, and contains 120 rooms.

== History ==
=== Three Kingdoms of Korea period ===
It was first built in 132 CE by Gaeru of kingdom of Baekje. During the Baekje era, this fortress was used for the defense of the capital when Baekje set up its capital at Wiryeseong Fortress in Hanam.

=== Joseon period ===
The current Bukhansanseong Fortress was built in 1711 CE by King Sukjong of Joseon. After the Japanese invasions of Korea (1592–98) and Second Manchu invasion of Korea (1636), fierce discussion broke out in the royal court about constructing fortress that can protect the kingdom against external threats. Although discussion about building new fortress began in 1451 CE during the era of king Munjong of Joseon, Actual construction of the Bukhansanseong Fortress began on 3 April, in 1711 during 37th year of King Sukjong of Joseon. The construction of Bukhansanseong Fortress was relatively faster than discussion and planning period. 12.7 km of Fortress outer wall was built just in 6-month time (October in 1711). Haeng-gung (행궁, Temporary Palace), was built in May 1712, and Jongseongmun, (중성문), which was built to protect inner fortress and essential facilities, such as Haenggung or jung-heung-sa (중흥사), was finished in 1714.

== Structure ==
Total length of Bukhansanseong Fortress is 12.7 km and total area of the Fortress is 6.2 km^{2}. There were 6 great gates, 8 secret gates, 2 water gates, and 143 seongrang (성랑, sentry post)

Names of Bukhansanseong Gates
| Korean | English | Classification |
|---|---|---|
| 북문 | Bungmun | North Gate |
| 대서문 | Daeseomun | Great West Gate |
| 중성문 | Jungseongmun | Great Gate |
| 대동문 | Daedongmun | Great East Gate |
| 대성문 | Daeseongmun | Great Gate |
| 대남문 | Daenammun | Great South Gate |
| 수문 | Sumun | Water Gate and Secret Gate |
| 서암문 | Seoammun | Secret Gate |
| 백운봉암문 | Baegunbongammun | Secret Gate |
| 용암문 | Yongammun | Secret Gate |
| 보국문 | Bogukmun | Secret Gate |
| 가사당암문 | Gasadangammun | Secret Gate |
| 부왕동암문 | Buwangdongammun | Secret Gate |
| 청수동암문 | Cheongsudongammun | Secret Gate |

Bukhansanseong Fortress also has one Temporary Palace, three Jangdae (장대, Commanding Post), three Yuyoung (유영, Military Camp)for defensive purpose. Three different units were stationed in Bukhansanseong Fortress, called Samgunmun (Hunryeongdogam, Geumweiyoung, and Eoyoungcheong). They were stationed in three different location within Bukhansanseong Fortress, and the main responsibility of those units was the protection of the Bukhansanseong Fortress.

Defensive Structures
| Korean | English | Classification |
|---|---|---|
| 행궁 | Haenggung | Temporary Palace |
| 북장대지 | Bukjangdaeji | Northern Commanding Post |
| 남장대지 | Namjangdaeji | Southern Commanding Post |
| 동장대 | Dongjangdae | Eastern Commanding Post |
| 훈련도감 유영지 | Hunryeongdogam Yuyoungji | Military Camp |
| 금위영 유영지 | Geumweiyoung Yuyoungji | Military Camp |
| 어영청 유영지 | Eoyoungcheong Yuyoungji | Military Camp |

13 Buddhist temples were also established within the wall of Bukhansanseong Fortress for Buddhist monks soldiers. Only 6 Buddhist temples remain today, but all lost temples are designated as historical site.

Name of Buddhist Temple in Bukhansanseong Fortress
| Korean | English | Classification |
|---|---|---|
| 중흥사 (지) | Jeungheungsa(ji) | Buddhist Temple & Historical site |
| 서암사(지) | Seo'amsa(ji) | Buddhist Temple & Historical site |
| 태고사 | Taegosa | Buddhist Temple |
| 상운사 | Sangwunsa | Buddhist Temple |
| 진국사(노적사) | Jingooksa(Nojeoksa) | Buddhist Temple (*reestablished and renamed) |
| 봉선암 | Bongseong'am | Buddhist Temple |
| 국녕사 | Guknyeongsa | Buddhist Temple |
| 용암사(지) | Yong'amsa(ji) | Buddhist Temple & Historical site |
| 원각사(지) | Wongaksa(ji) | Buddhist Temple & Historical site |
| 원효암 | Wonhyo'am | Buddhist Temple |
| 보광사(지) | Bogwangsa(ji) | Buddhist Temple & Historical site |
| 보국사(지) | Boguksa(ji) | Buddhist Temple & Historical site |
| 부왕사(지) | Buwangsa(ji) | Buddhist Temple & Historical site |

In addition, 7 Armories, 99 wells, and 22 small reservoirs were under the control of Bukhansanseong Fortress.

== See also ==
- Namhansanseong
- History of Korea
- List of fortresses in Korea
- Hwaseong Fortress
