= Joseon Army (1881–1897) =

Reformed army of Korea

- Flag of Korea (1882–1910)
- Active: 1881
- Disbanded: 13 October 1897
- Country: Korea
- Allegiance: King of Joseon
- Branch: Royal Guards; Central Army; Provincial armies and Militias
- Type: Army
- Role: Ground warfare
- Size: 30,000–50,000
- Engagements: Imo Incident; Gapsin Coup; Donghak Peasant Revolution; Eulmi Incident

Insignia
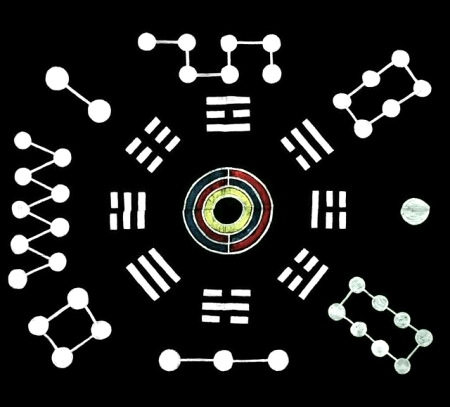
- Ensign

The Joseon Army of the late 19th century (Korean: 조선군대; Hanja: 朝鮮軍隊) was the modernized army of the Korean dynasty of Joseon. After the Treaty of Ganghwa, King Gojong and Queen Myeongseong spearheaded the modernization of the armed forces. The army was known for the Donghak Peasant Revolution, its defense of Gyeongbokgung Palace, and defending Queen Min from the Japanese. Despite this, the new modernized army was too weak to defend itself from foreign threats and could not prevent the assassination of Queen Min. Gojong declared Joseon the Empire of Korea and contributed the modernization of the armed forces.

== History ==
After opening its ports in 1876, Joseon learned of the world situation. It realized its progress, leading Joseon to promote a progressive movement for 'enlightenment' policies called the Enlightenment Movement (Gaehwaundong). But it took the longest out of all the other modernization projects. In 1880, under King Gojong and his consort Queen Min's joint patronage, they created the Office for Extraordinary State Affairs (Tongnigimu-Amun), consisting of 12 departments charged with diplomacy, trade, finance, and military affairs.

=== Modernization and the Imo Incident ===
In 1881, Gojong and Min spearheaded the military modernization efforts. Joseon dispatched the so-called Gentlemen's Sightseeing Group to Japan or Courtiers' Observation Mission (Sinsayuramdan). They invited the Japanese Army attaché Lieutenant Horimoto Reizō to serve as an adviser in creating a modern army. The Japanese gave military training to eighty to one hundred young men of the aristocracy, establishing the Special Skills Force (Pyŏlgigun, Korean: 별기군). They also sent a royally appointed advisor (Yeongseonsa) and students to Tianjin to learn about the manufacture of firearms and munitions. In January 1882, the government reorganized the Five Army Camps (ogunyeong) into the Palace Guards Garrison (Muwiyŏng, Korean: 무위영) and the Capital Guards Garrison (Changŏyŏng, Korean: 창어영). However, these units were resentful towards the Special Skills Force for better treatment and equipment. Additionally, the army discharged more than 1,000 soldiers in overhauling the military; most were old or disabled. The army did not pay them in rice for thirteen months leading up to the Imo Incident, which claimed the lives of some Japanese military advisors and their legislation and some Joseon officials. Daewongun returned to power momentarily to restore order. Daewongun dismantled the Muwiyŏng, the Changŏyŏng, and the Pyŏlgigun and revived the Five-Army Camps. In December 1882, after Daewongun's arrest, the government disbanded the Five-Army Camps once more. The Chinese lines under Yuan Shikai reorganized and trained into a new Joseon military formation, the Capital Guards Command (Chingunyeong, Korean: 친군영).

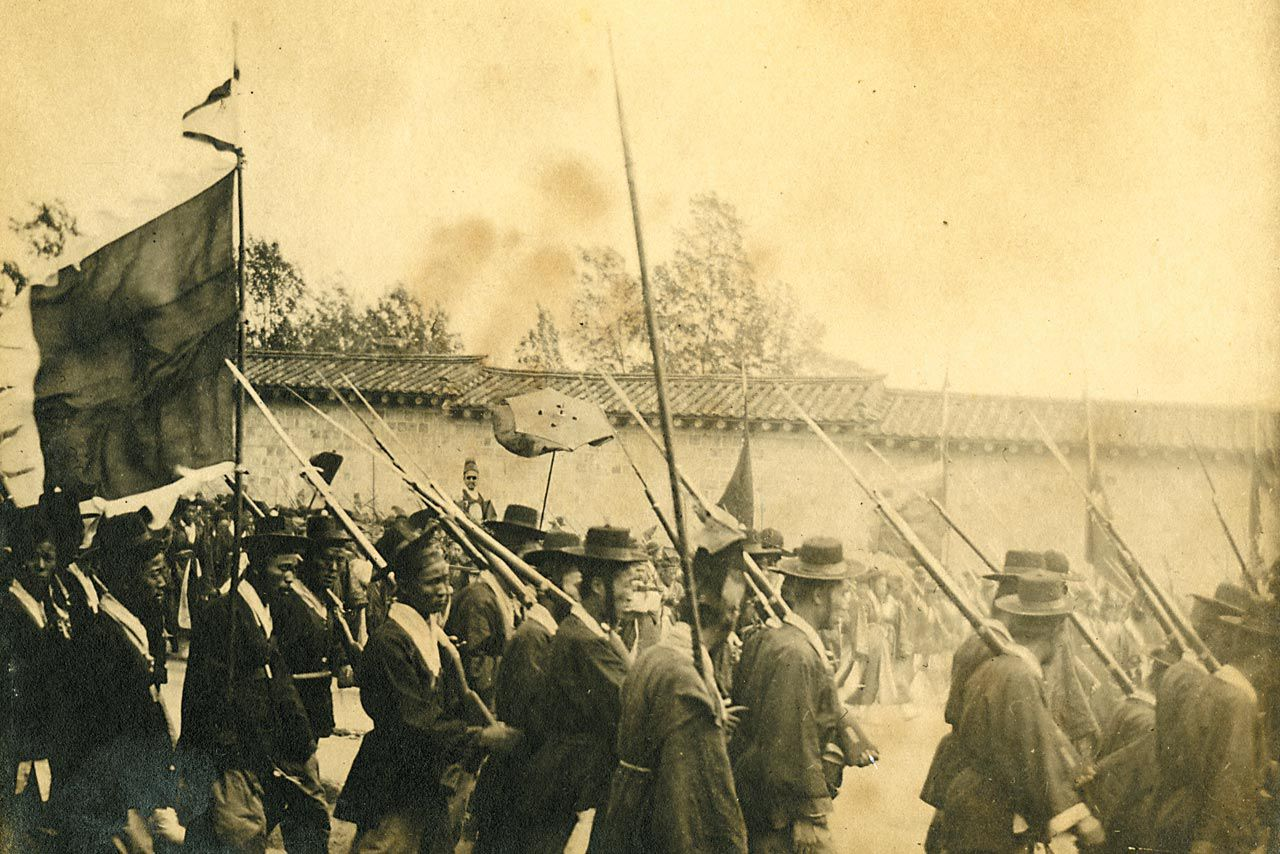
Modernized Joseon Army procession with King Gojong in the background

Gojong and Min requested the United States for more American military instructors to speed up the military modernization of Korea. In October 1883, American minister Lucius Foote arrived to take command of the modernization of Joseon's older army units that had not started Westernizing. They established their first military factories and a modern armory (Gigichang) and created new military uniforms in 1884. In April 1888, General William McEntyre Dye and two other military instructors arrived from the United States, followed in May by a fourth instructor. They brought about rapid military development. They established a new military school called Yeonmu Gongwon and an officers' training program to begin making the armies become more and more on par with the Chinese and the Japanese. After the UK occupied Port Hamilton (Geomun Island) in 1889, the Joseon government took a more effective national defense.

=== Donghak Peasant Revolution ===
The Joseon Army, as it existed in the early 1890s, consisted of about 3,000–50,000 soldiers at the time of the Donghak Peasant Revolution. In January 1894, the modernized army was deployed against the Donghak Peasant Revolution but lost many battles in the beginning due to their sheer numbers and innovative tactics. When Gojong requested help from the Qing to suppress the rebels, the Japanese sent troops to Seoul, demanding the Joseon Government send the Qing back. The government refused, and Japan stormed Gyeongbokgung. Despite resistance from Capital Guards Command, Japan occupied the palace and established a pro-Japanese government beginning the Gabo Reform and the Sino-Japanese War. As per the Gabo Reform, the government disbanded the Capital Guards Garrison. Japan allied with the Joseon Army and finally suppressed the Donghak rebels in December 1895. The Japanese forced the Qing out of Joseon after winning the war.

=== Gabo Reform ===
There were about 5,000 soldiers in 1895. During the Gabo reform, the government, under the direction of the Japanese, established the Hullyeondae or the "Military Training Division." They are an elite regiment of royal guards trained and equipped by the Japanese and led by old Korean Army members who hold pro-Japanese sentiments. Gojong of Korea established the Capital Guards (Siwidae (시위대), (侍衛隊)). The minister of the military supervises the training of the Capital Guards. On 8 October 1895, the Japanese convinced the officers of the Hullyeondae that the royal family was seeking help from the Russians and plotted to assassinate Queen Min. One thousand Hullyeondae troops stormed the palace and defeated the Capital Guards, allowing the ronin to assassinate her. As a result, Gojong ordered the deaths of pro-Japanese officials, ending the Gabo Reform. After her death, Gojong disbanded the Military Training Division for their part in the assassination and the Capital Guards in August 1895 for failing to stop the Japanese.

He reorganized them into the Chinwidae, a modernized 1,000-strong royal guard armed with Berdan rifles trained by Russian military advisors beginning in 1896, serving as the core of an improved army. Soldiers sometimes transferred to other units from this core unit, including five regiments of about 900 soldiers each. Gojong organized the provincial armies, the Jibangdae in response to the assassination, and then reorganized them into the Jinwidae, modernized provincial armies in 1897. On that same year, he proclaimed Joseon the Korean Empire dedicated to modernizing the country and the army. When the Joseon Dynasty became the Korean Empire, their numbers grew to 28,000 before 1907.

== First Formation ==
=== Special Skills Force ===
The Pyŏlgigun (Korean: 별기군, "Special Skills Force" or "Special Army") was the first modernised military force of Korea. First conceived in 1876, it was formed in 1881 and trained by Japanese officers led by Horimoto Reijo, military attaché at the Japanese legation. It received better treatment than the old Korean Army, whose soldiers' salaries were in arrears on account of the costs of the Byeolgigun. This led in 1882 to the Imo mutiny, in which soldiers rioted and Horimoto Reizō was killed.

In May 1881, as part of its plan to modernise the country, the Korean government invited the Japanese military attaché, Lieutenant Horimoto Reizō, to serve as an adviser in creating a modern army. From 80 to 100 young men of the aristocracy were to be given Japanese military training and make up the newly formed Special Skills Force.

=== Palace Guards Garrison ===
Muwiyeong (무위영 (武衛營)) was a military camp established in November 1881 (the 18th year of King Gojong's reign). The existing Five Military Camps (Ogunyeong, 五軍營) were reorganized into two camps: Mu Wi Yeong (武衛營) and Jang Eo Yeong (壯禦營). As part of this reform, three of the original five camps—Hunryeondogam (訓鍊都監), Yonghoyeong (龍虎營), and Howicheong (扈衛廳)—were merged into Mu Wi Yeong.

The military structure historically adhered to a traditional organization, led by a commander-in-chief (Daejang, 大將) who oversaw a central army known as Junggun (中軍). Within this central army were left and right divisions (Jwabyeolgun, 左別軍 & Ubyeolgun, 右別軍), with subordinate officers (Chogwan, 哨官) under their command. Notable changes included the renaming of several military titles, such as “Nangcheong (郎廳)” to “Gunsaek (軍色),” “Jongsagwan (從事官)” to “Hyangsaek (餉色),” “Jwabyeoljjang (左別將)” to “Geumgun Byeoljjang (禁軍別將),” and “Ubyeoljjang (右別將)” to “Seongi Byeoljjang (善騎別將).” Additionally, Mu Wi Yeong represented a continuation of Mu Wi So (武衛所), which was established in April 1874, serving as an elite royal guard and a protection force for the palace.

However, in 1882, Mu Wi Yeong was abolished by Heungseon Daewongun (흥선대원군).

=== Capital Guards Garrison ===
Jangeoyeong (장어영 (壯禦營)) was a military camp in November 1881, during the 18th year of King Gojong’s reign. It was established as part of a reorganization of the Five Military Camps (Ogunyeong, 五軍營) into two camps (Yangyeong, 兩營) to enhance military command efficiency, soldier training, and equipment management. This reform merged three of the original camps—Chongyungcheong (摠戎廳), Eoyeongcheong (御營廳), and Geumwiyeong (禁衛營). Shin Jeong-hui (申正熙) was appointed as the first commander (Jang Eo Daejang, 壯禦大將), and the camp’s administration included one Dojejo (都提調) and two Jejo (提調), with other personnel remaining consistent with those from Chongyungcheong.

The organizational structure adhered to traditional military practices, featuring a commander-in-chief (Daejang, 大將) leading a central army (Junggun, 中軍), supported by left and right divisions (Jwabyeolgun, 左別軍 & Ubyeolgun, 右別軍), each commanded by subordinate officers (Chogwan, 哨官).

Jang Eo Yeong functioned as an elite royal guard unit dedicated to defending the capital, but it was abolished in 1882.

=== Martial Arts Department ===
The Martial Arts Department (무예청 (武藝廳)) was a division of the Military Training Command, who served as guards for King Seonjo during the Imjin War. It was an organization composed of skilled martial artists who were responsible for guarding the five grand palaces and providing close protection to the king. The officers belonging to the office were specially referred to as Martial Arts Special Guards (무예별감) or simply Martial Guards ("무감", 武監). It was also known as the military officials (mugwan (무관 (武官)).

The establishment process of the Martial Arts Department is detailed in King Sunjo of Joseon's work called Pure Study Records (순제고). The Martial Arts Department selected exceptional individuals with outstanding martial arts skills from the military training center (훈련도감).

After the prohibition on wearing civilian clothing in 1883, all Martial Arts Special Guards were required to wear standard traditional military uniforms and were equipped with modern rifles and hwando (swords). In 1894, the Martial Arts Department disbanded after the Gabo Reforms and the Eulmi Incident as part of the military reforms leading to the establishment of the Imperial Korean Armed Forces.

== Capital Guards Command ==
The Chingunyeong (친군영), also known as the Capital Guards Command, was a military unit in Korea that was responsible for protecting the royal family and the capital city. It was the central military system established in Joseon in response to the Imo Rebellion. The Joseon government, seeking measures to strengthen and fortify the capital defense forces after the Imo Rebellion, sought assistance from the Qing Dynasty to train its troops and supply modern weapons.

In November 1882 (the 19th year of King Gojong's reign), a unit trained by Yuan Shikai at the training center was called the 1,000-member Newly Established Capital Left Camp (신건친군좌영), and a unit trained by Zhu Xianmin at the East Separate Camp (동별영) was called the 500-member Capital Right Camp (친군우영).

Then, in October 1883, a training center was established and referred to as the Capital Front Camp (친군전영). In July 1884, a unit that moved to the Training Ground (연무대) was designated as the Capital Rear Camp (친군후영), and in November of the same year, the Capital Garrison (금위영) was established forming a new central military system consisting of Capital Five Camps (친군 5영). In addition, the traditional military camps of the Dragon and Tiger Camp (용호영), Royal Guard Command (어영청), and the Command of the Northern Approaches (총융청) were incorporated into the new system.

In addition, in 1885, the Capital Guards Command organization expanded beyond Seoul to the provinces. The Pyongyang Garrison (평양 감영) was established as the Capital Western Camp (친군서영) in Pyeongan Province, and in 1886, the Coastal Defense Camp (해방영) was established. In 1887, the Capital Central Camp (친군 심영) in Ganghwa, the Capital South Camp (친군 남영) in Daegu, Gyeongsang Province. These camps were trained and occasionally deployed together with the central army. However, the Capital Guard Command of the central army was reorganized and developed into four camps: General Defense (총어), Unified Defense (통위), Strong Defense (장위), and Logistical Support (경리) in 1888. The Southern Military Camp (무남영) in Jeonju in 1893, the North Camp (북영) in Jongseong in 1894, the Southern Garrison (진남영) in Cheongju, and the Defensive Garrison (진어영) in Chuncheon.

=== Organization ===
The basic organization of the Capital Military Camp (친군제영) consisted of one Camp Commander (영사), ten Soldiers (병방), one Camp Officer (영관), one Staff Officer (참군), five Scouts (초관), five Separate Branch Officers (별군관), one Military Doctor (군의), five or six Sentries (초장), twenty-five Servants (집사), eight or nine Separate Warriors (별무사), around ten staff members, one Assistant Secretary for Government Orders (정령대령서리), two or three Special Situation Secretaries (기별서리), five or six Scouts (초서), five or six Storekeepers (고직), two or three Office Clerks (청직), and eighty-seven Ceremonial Guards (의례병).

In addition, there were eighty-seven Patrol Enforcers (순령수), forty-four Lantern Troops (등롱군), forty-four Tent Troops (장막군), over two hundred Waiting Troops (대령군), five Five Sentries (초), forty to fifty Firearm Soldiers (화병), around ten Separate Formation Breakers (별파진), over thirty Diversionary Cavalry (복마군), over sixty Gate Guards (수문군), five Grooms (마부), and around fifty Miscellaneous Staff (잡색원).

== Third Formation ==
=== Military Training Division ===
The Hullyeondae (Korean: 훈련대; Hanja: 訓練隊; "Military Training Division") was a Korean Army Regiment established under Imperial Japanese direction as a part of the second Gabo Reform in 1895, the 32nd year of Gojong of Korea's reign. On 17 January in the same year, Japanese legation minister Inoue Kaoru suggested the king found a new regiment of Royal Guards. This elite regiment, trained and equipped by the Japanese, were officered by members of the old Korean Army.

The Regiment was composed of three battalions, and a headquarters company, totaling about 1000 Soldiers. The first battalion was commanded by Major Woo Beomseon. The second battalion was commanded by Major Yi Doohwang, and the third battalion was commanded by Major Yi Jinho. All of these commanders had participated successfully during operations against the Donghak peasant rebels and the Chinese Army in 1894–1895. The regiment was composed of the most progressive element of the Korean Army.

Convinced that Queen Min was conspiring with the Russians to bring their troops into the country, the Regiment attacked the Imperial Palace on 8 October 1895, allowing the ronin to kill the Empress.

=== Capital Guards ===
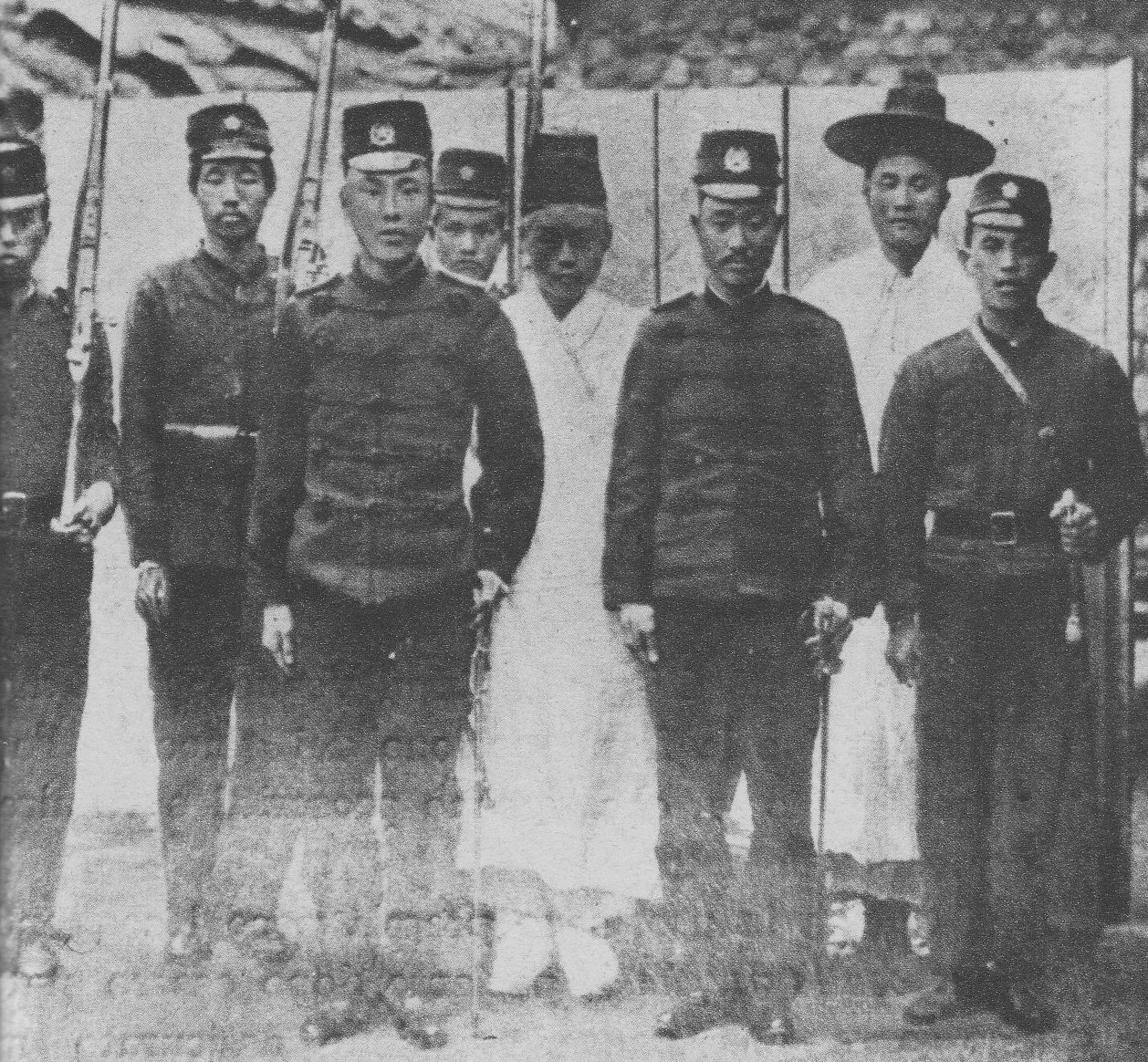
Siwidae, the Capital Guards before the Eulmi Reforms of 1895.

The Capital Guards are the escort troops of the king of the late Joseon Dynasty and were organized according to the promulgation of Imperial Decree No. 120 on 25 May, 32nd year of King Gojong (1895) of Joseon. Under the supervision of the military minister, he was in charge of the Capital Guards in the palace, and the organization was 1 regiment (2 battalions), 1 battalion (2 companies), and 1 company (3 platoons). When the Eulmi Incident (乙未事變), which killed Empress Myeongseong, occurred in August, three months after its establishment, it was disbanded and transferred to the training unit for not preventing the assassination. In March of the first year of Gwangmu (1897), the Capital Guards were re-established while reorganizing the 中央軍 into Russian style. According to a report by the Russian Admiralty of 10 December 1896, Khmelev, captain of the Russian cruiser Admiral Kornilov, trained demonstrators, translated Russian garrison corrections into Korean, and used Russian military terminology. has been used With a total of 1,070 people, 200 people were organized into 1 company and 5 companies into 1 battalion.

=== Provincial Armies ===
In May 1896, the Jibangdae expanded and was divided into eight battalions ranging from 200 to 600 troops and assigned battalion commanders (majors) to command them. But in September 1896, the standard number of troops in a unit drew to 400 troops, and they expanded into fourteen battalions with 5,600 troops.

== Equipment ==
=== Uniforms ===
Seeking to strengthen national defense, King Gojong founded Korea’s first modern military unit, the Gyoryeonbyeongdae (Drill Battalion), in April 1881. This unit was also known by the nicknames Byeolgigun (別技軍) and Wae-byeolgi (倭別技). Japanese officer Horimoto Reizō (掘本禮造) served as training instructor, and 80 volunteers were selected from the existing Five Army Camp (Ogunyeong) to begin training.

In May 1881, the Ministry of State Affairs (Tongni Gimu Amun) arranged for the royal guard unit, the Muwiso (武衛所), to supply the new soldiers’ uniforms. Later, the Military Affairs Bureau’s Drill Department (Gyoryeonguk) under the same ministry provided military equipment. Byeolgigun uniforms consisted of a hat, jacket, and trousers. The hat resembled the traditional jeollip (戰笠, Korean war cap), but its crown was flat, making it closer in form to the Western boater hat. The jacket had a stand-up collar (matgit) and fastened with buttons at the center front. Soldiers wore Western-style belts at the waist, and trousers matching or slightly lighter in color than the jacket.

According to the Seungjeongwon ilgi (承政院日記, Journal of the Royal Secretariat), on August 27, 1881, King Gojong, together with high-ranking officials, inspected the training of the Byeolgigun at Chundangdae. On this occasion, he ordered the unit to appear in full uniform with weapons. After their drills and demonstrations (siye, 試藝), he praised them as highly elite, likely impressed by their distinct attire and Western-style weaponry compared to older Korean troops.

The Confucian scholar-official Kim Hyeong-gyu (金衡圭) mentioned in his diary, Cheongu ilnok (靑又日錄), that Byeolgigun uniforms included a small jeollip, a jacket (gwaeja-ui), and a single-layer garment (dan-ui), with both sword and gun worn together. In Pungun Hanmal Bisa (風雲韓末秘史), serialized in the Dong-A Ilbo in 1931 by Yun Hyo-jeong (尹孝定, 1858–1939), it was noted that Byeolgigun uniforms were entirely grass-green (choroksaek), leading people to call the soldiers the “Green Uniformed Troops” (chorok gunbok).

These uniforms were also believed to have been worn by central garrison soldiers in the 1880s–1890s with some additional features. The hat had a Western shape but was made in the traditional Korean jeollip style, decorated with peacock feathers at the crown. An inscription on the red band across the front of the brim indicates a rank and unit such as a sojang (哨長, captain) of the Jeonyeong (前營, Front Camp) of the Royal Guards. The jacket with squared lapels, slightly longer in back than front, with a stand-up collar and five buttons down the front.

In 1895 at the time of Queen Min's assassination and after the Gabo Reform, the army adopted western uniforms with pith helmets, white uniforms with blanket rolls for the central and provincial army soldiers and black uniforms for officers and the royal guards. At the start of the Gwangmu Reform, they began adopting German-style uniforms.

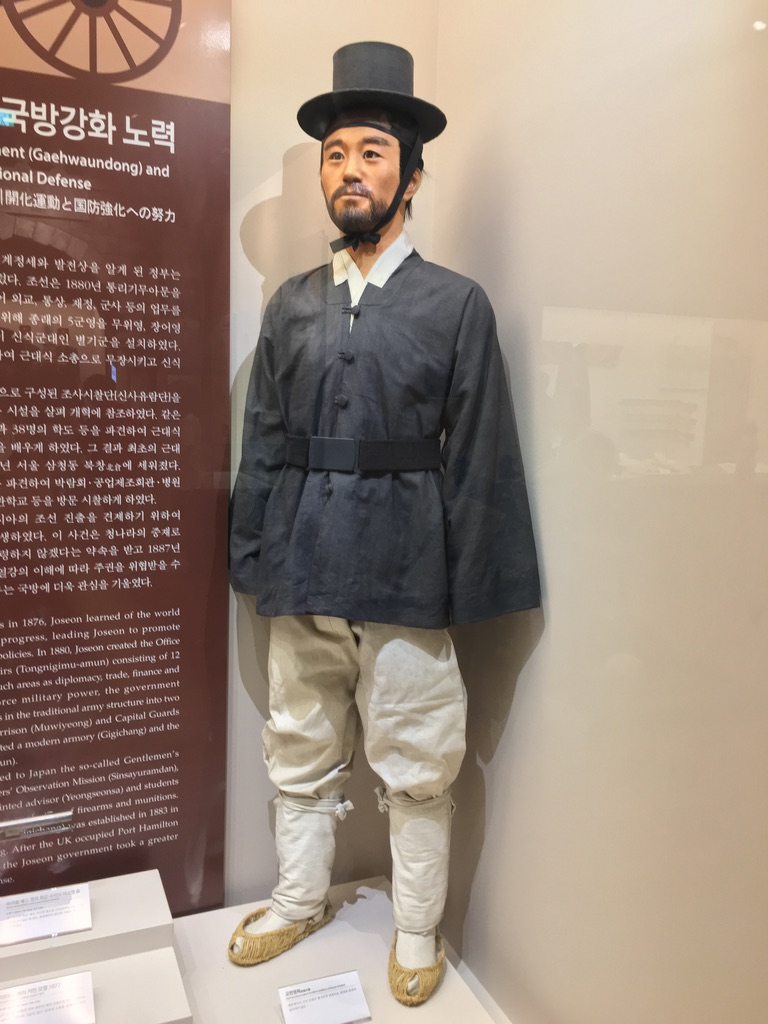
In the modern military of the Kingdom of Joseon, the military uniform of the Byeon-gi Army consists of separate upper and lower garments.

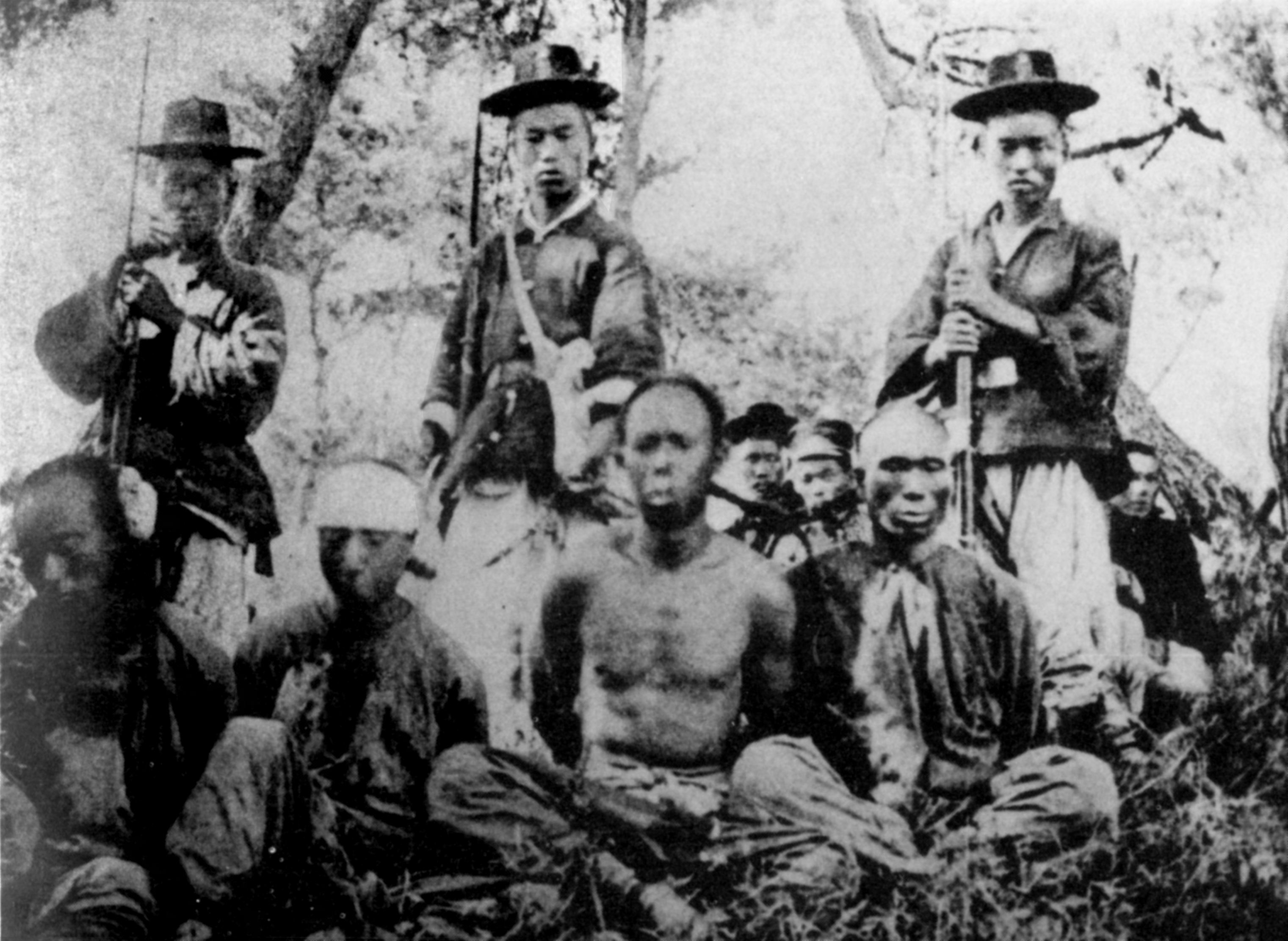
Korean soldiers wearing western-style overcoats with white ankle-length baggy pants guarding Chinese prisoners.

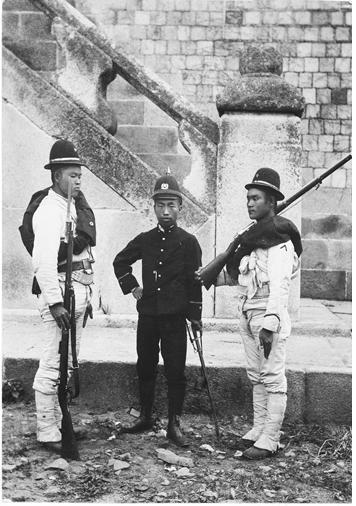
Royal Guards of the Late Joseon Dynasty wearing western uniforms.

=== Weapons ===
The Joseon dynasty attempted to reverse-engineer European firearms to counter their rising threat in the 19th century. When the Americans captured Ganghwa Island's coastal fortresses, the Joseon Army first used these modern weapons to reinforce the island. After signing the Treaty of Ganghwa, Japan, Qing, the United States, and the European nations started importing modern weapons such as rifles, artillery, machine guns, western sabers, and bayonets in 1883 until its annexation in 1910. From 1887, Gojong even tried to make weapons by themselves which however never succeed.

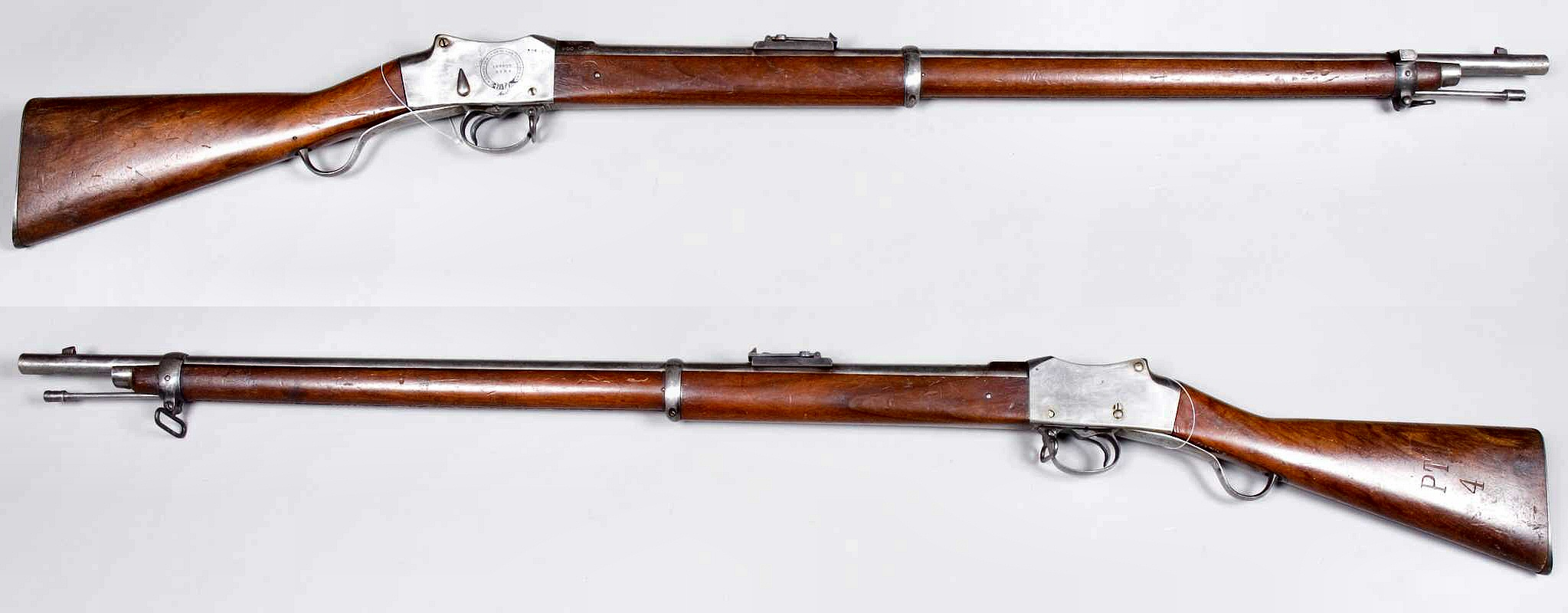
Martini-Henry m1871. Acquired from Great Britain in (1881-1884)

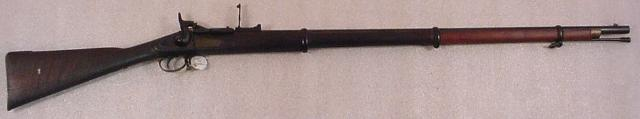
Snyder Enfield rifle. Acquired from Great Britain in (1881-1884)

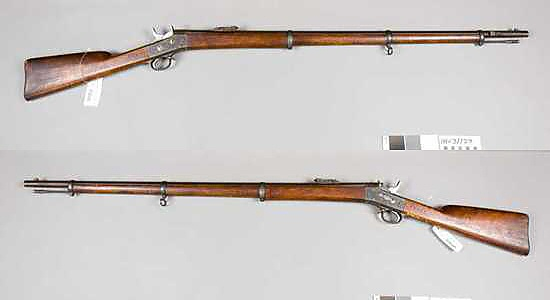
Remington Rolling Block rifle. Acquired from the United States in (1884-1895)

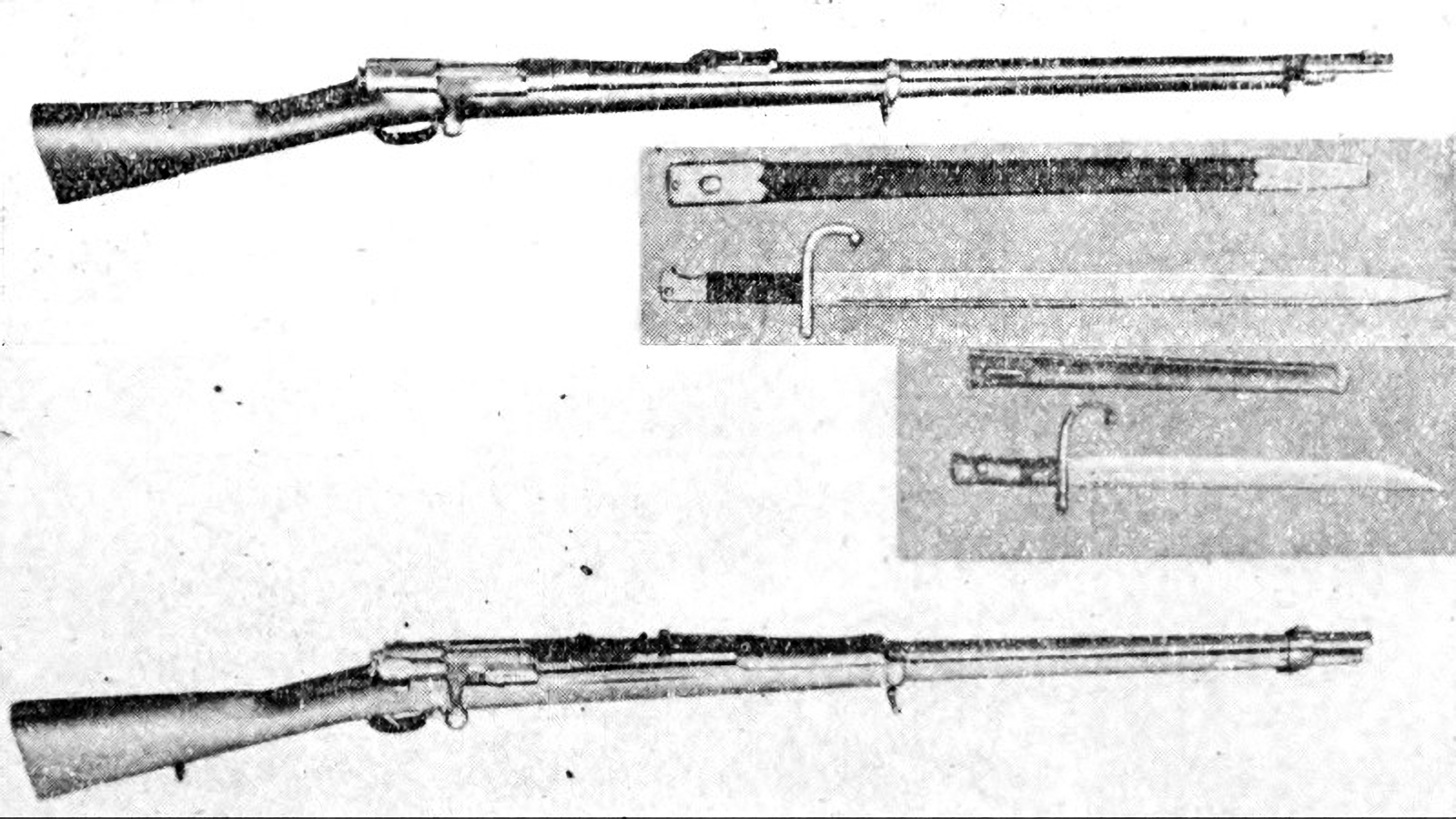
Murata Type 13 rifle (top) with Murata Type 22 carbine (bottom). Acquired from the Japanese Empire in (1880s~).

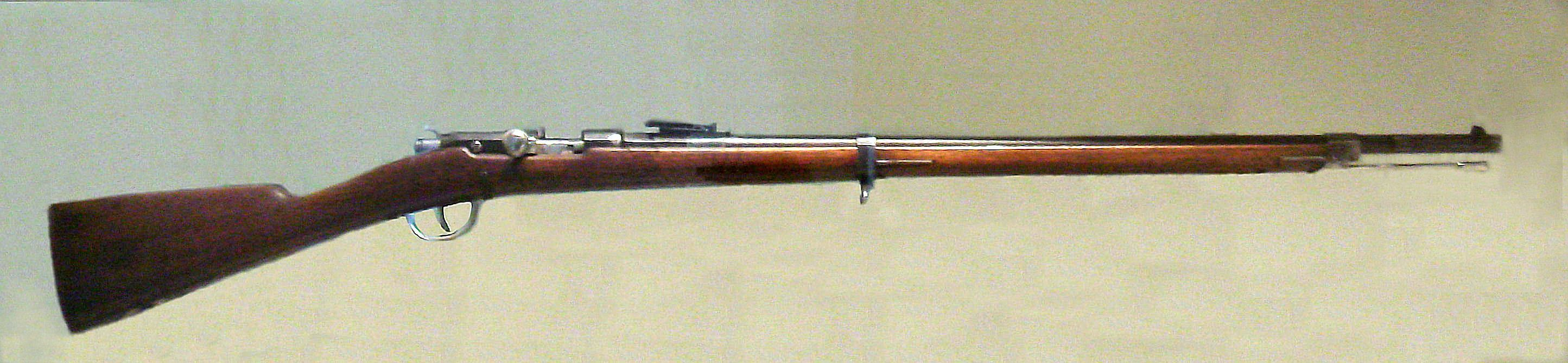
Fusil Gras M80 1874. Acquired from France.

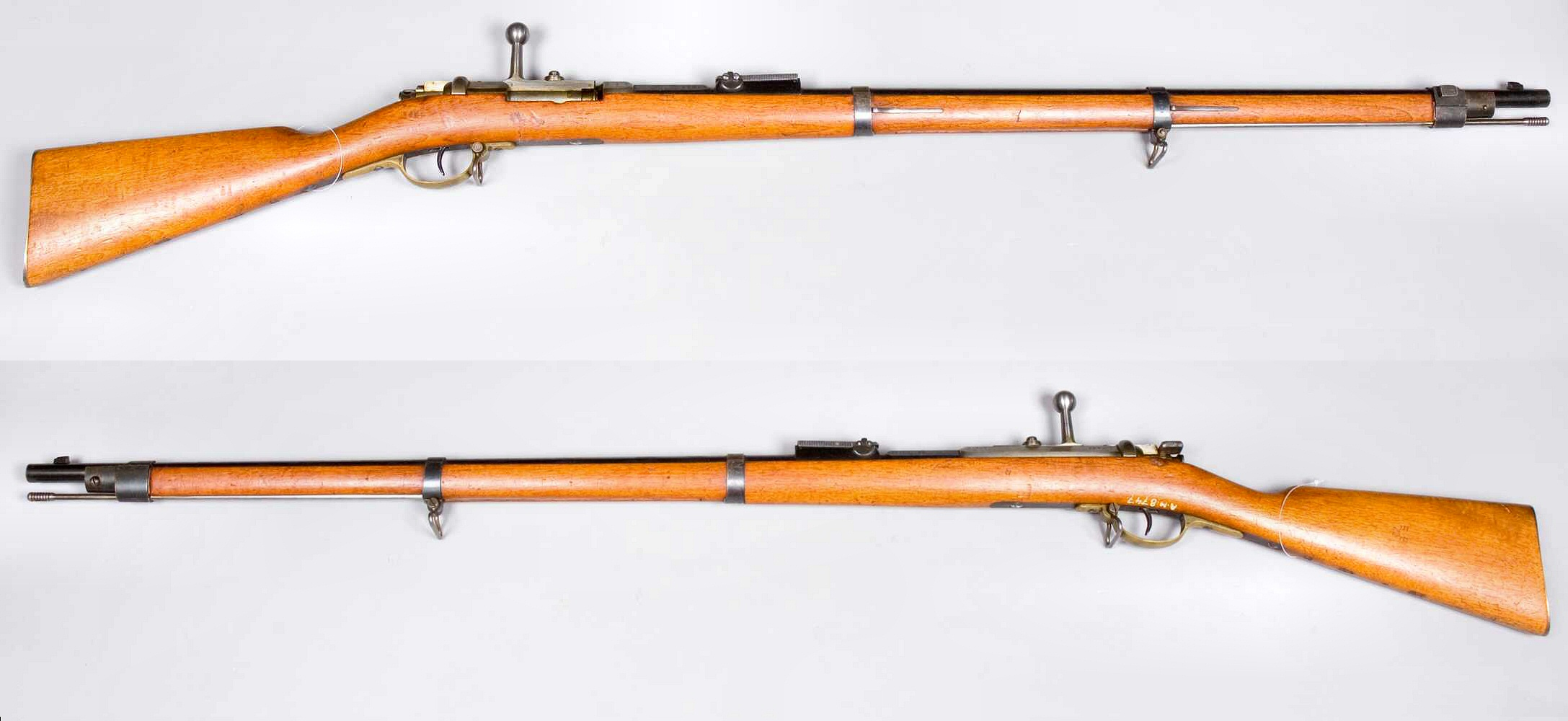
Mauser Model 1871. Acquired from the German Empire in (1893~). It was the standard-issued rifle of the modern Joseon Army.

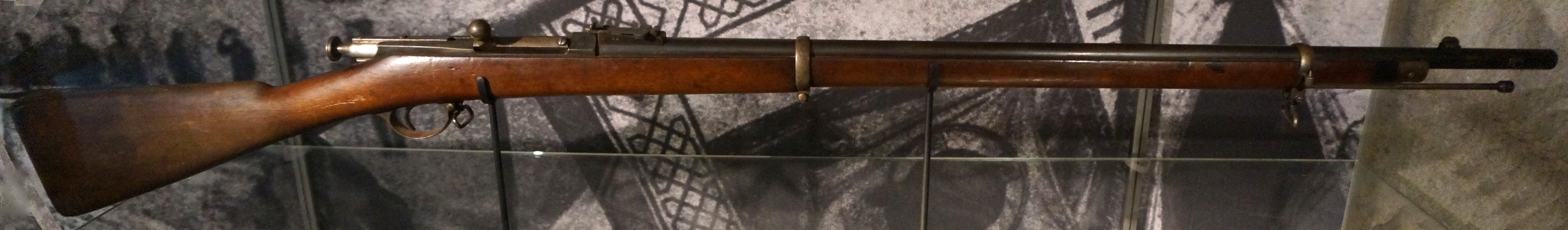
Berdan rifle. Acquired from the Russian Empire in (1896~). The royal guard used them, but they were not often the Mauser Model 1871.

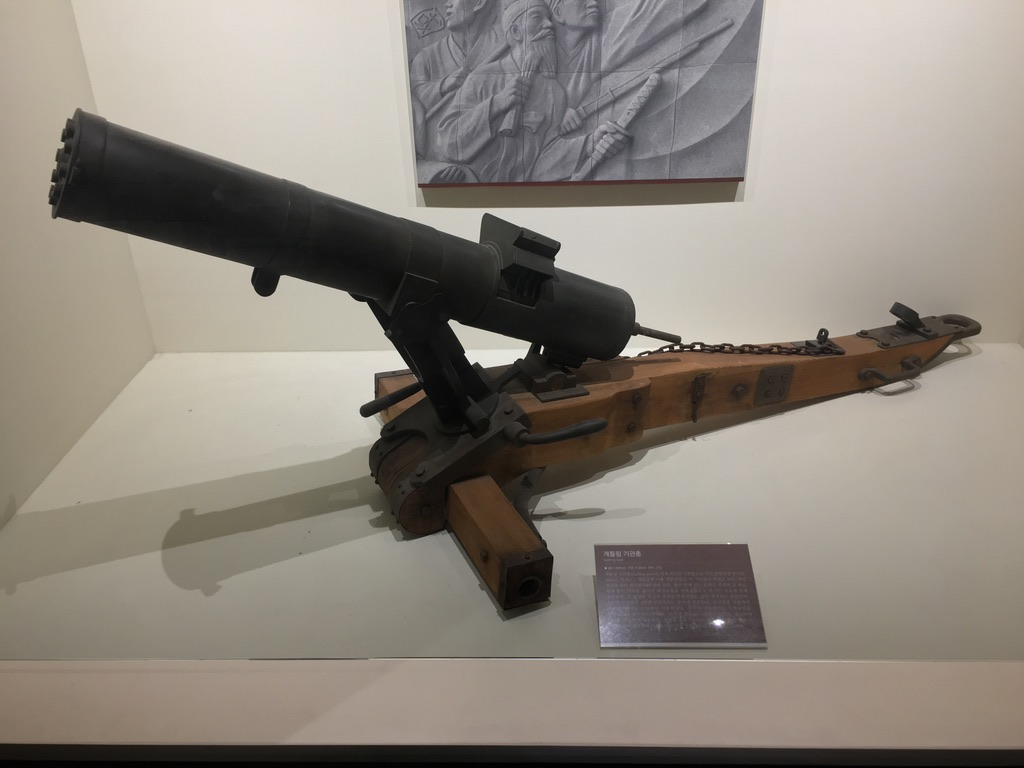
Gatling Gun. Used during the Donghak Peasant Revolution. Acquired from the United States (1883~).

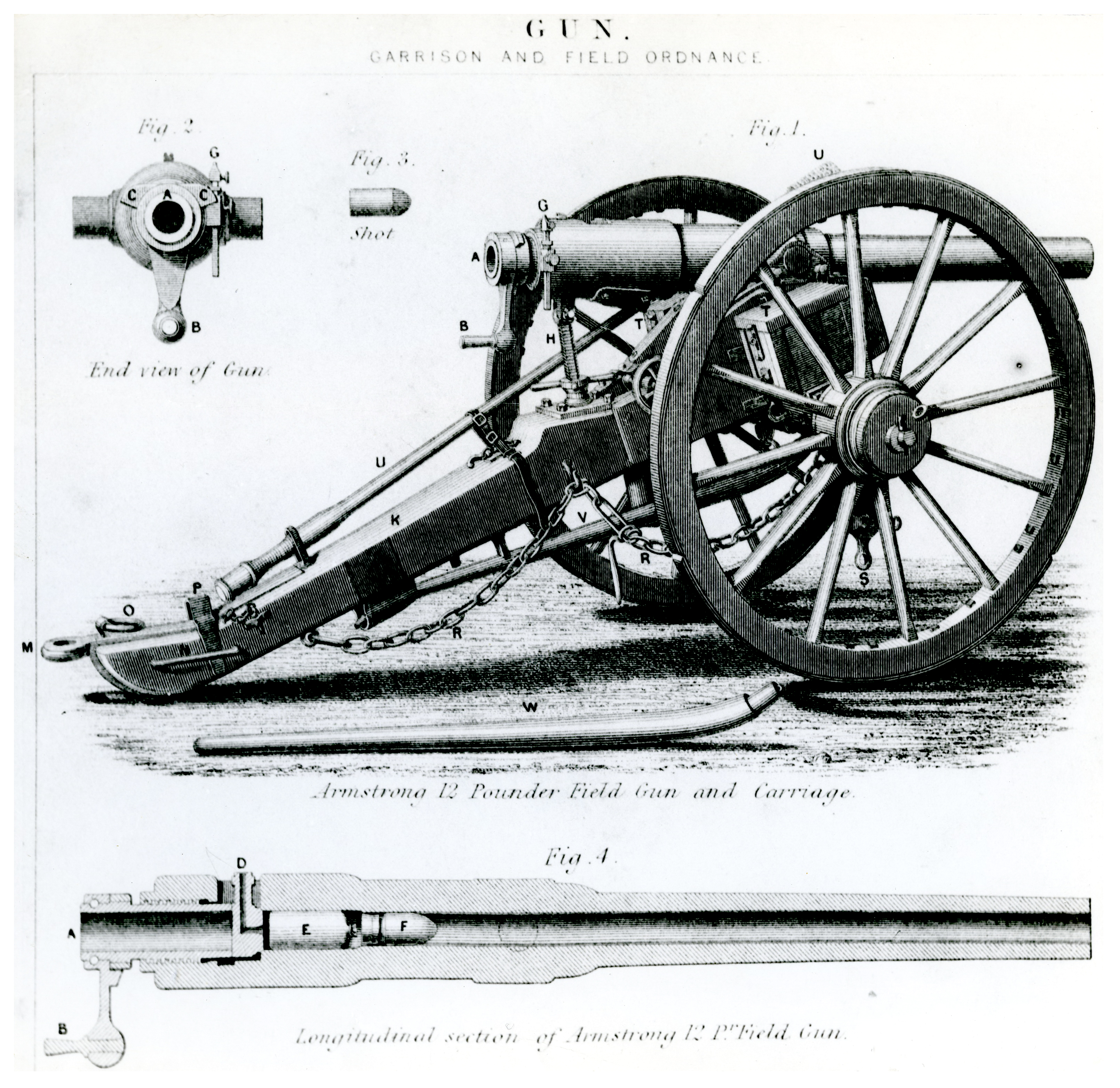
Armstrong 12 Pounder Field Gun. Acquired from Great Britain (1880s)

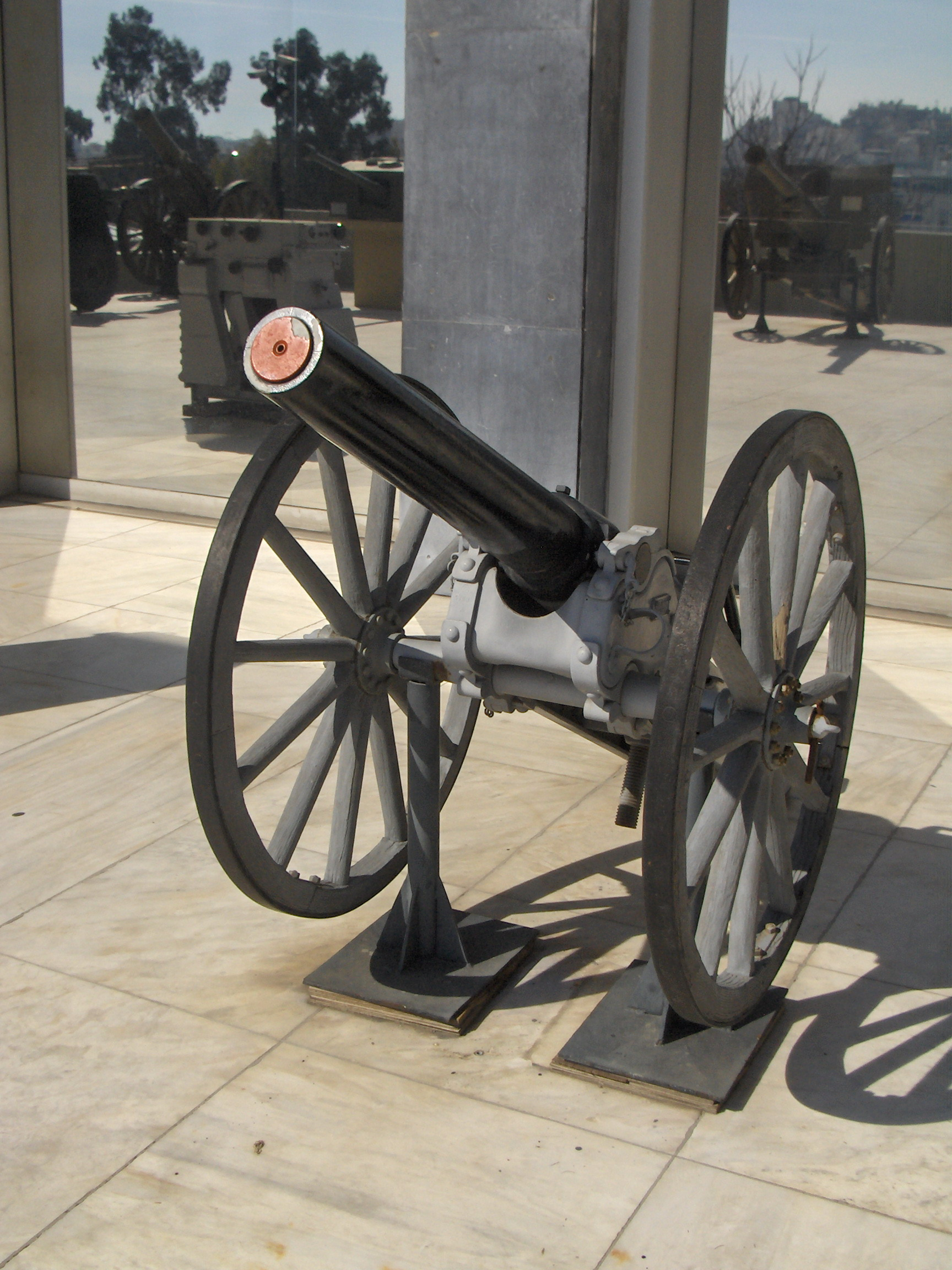
Krupp 75mm mountain gun. Acquired from the German Empire in (Unknown).

== See also ==
- Joseon Navy
- Joseon Dynasty
- Hong Gye-hun
- Righteous Army
- Imo Incident
- Donghak Peasant Revolution
- Sino-Japanese War
- Eulmi Incident
- Imperial Korean Armed Forces

== Bibliography ==
- Keene, Donald (2002). Emperor of Japan: Meiji and His World, 1852–1912. New York: Columbia University Press. ISBN 0-231-12341-8.
- Keltie, J.S., ed. (1900). The Statesman's Year Book: Statistical and Historical Annual of the States of the World for the Year 1900. New York: MacMillan.
- Kim, Djun Kil (2014). The History of Korea, 2nd Edition Greenwood. Santa Barbara, California: ABC-CLIO. ISBN 1-610-69582-8.
- Kim, Jinwung (2012). A History of Korea: From "Land of the Morning Calm" to States in Conflict. Indiana University Press. ISBN 0-253-00024-6.
- Lee, Seongjin (2009). 구한말의 호위제도 고찰 (in Korean). 한국경호경비학회지.
- Nussbaum, Louis Frédéric (2002). Japan Encyclopedia (translated by Käthe Roth). Cambridge MA.: Harvard University Press. ISBN 0-674-01753-6.
