= Baby Riot of 1888 =

1888 civil unrest due to rumors in Korea

- Hangul: 영아 소동
- Hanja: 嬰兒騷動
- RR: Yeonga sodong
- MR: Yŏnga sodong

The Baby Riots of 1888 took place in the summer of 1888 in Joseon Korea. Rumours circulated that foreigners in Seoul were kidnapping young Korean infants and children, gouging out their eyes for use as camera lenses, grinding their internal organs for use in medicine, and eating them. These rumours implicated both the western powers that were present in Korea at the time, as well as the Japanese. These riots saw Koreans gathering outside hospitals, schools and churches run by foreigners to rail against the 'baby-snatchers' inside. Many in the foreign community were alarmed by the ferocity of the riots and made preparations to leave Korea, and diplomatic representatives of the foreign legations pressed the Joseon government to repudiate the rumours, which they did reluctantly. While it was initially speculated that the Heungseon Daewongun instigated the incident in a manner similar to the Imo Incident, or the combination of Catholic zeal and local anti-Christian sentiment, many began to speculate that these rumours were deliberately spread by the order of Yuan Shikai, the ambassador and representative of the suzerain Qing dynasty in China, either to scare off foreign investment in Korea or provoke a military intervention. For his part, Yuan emphatically denied this to his superior, Li Hongzhang.
