= Office of Martial Arts Guards =

1630–1897 Korean military unit

- Coat of Arms of Joseon
- Active: 1630
- Disbanded: 13 October 1897
- Country: (Korea) Joseon
- Allegiance: (Korea) King of Joseon
- Branch: Joseon Army (late 19th century)
- Type: Palace Guard; Central Army
- Part of: Military Training Agency
- Engagements: Imjin War; 1728 Musin Rebellion; Eulmi Incident

Insignia
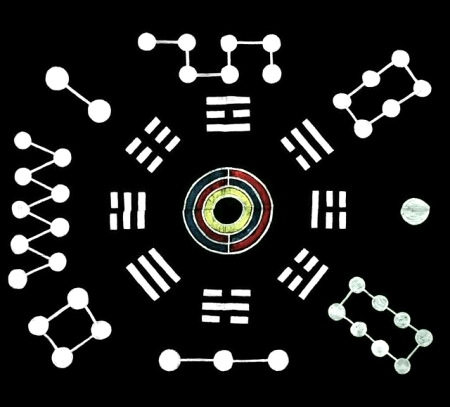
- Ensign

- Flag of Korea (1882–1910)

The Office of Martial Arts Guards (Korean: 무예별감; Hanja: 武藝別監) was a division of the Military Training Command, who served as guards for King Seonjo during the Imjin War. It was an organization composed of skilled martial artists who were responsible for guarding the five grand palaces and providing close protection to the king. The officers belonging to the office were specially referred to as Martial Arts Special Guards (무예별감) or simply Martial Guards (무감; 武監). It was also known as the military officials (무관; 武官; mugwan).

== Summary ==
The establishment process of the Office of Martial Arts Guards is detailed in King Sunjo of Joseon's work called Pure Study Records (순제고). After the end of the Japanese invasion of Korea, a specialized organization called the Martial Arts Office was established to provide exclusive protection to the king. The Office of Martial Arts Guards selected exceptional individuals with outstanding martial arts skills from the military training center (훈련도감) and served as the king's bodyguards. In 1894, the Martial Arts Department disbanded after the Gabo Reforms and the Eulmi Incident as part of the military reforms leading to the establishment of the Imperial Korean Armed Forces.

== Organization ==
In 1630 (the 8th year of King Injo's reign), the Martial Arts Department was established with a staff of 30 people and was placed under the supervision of the Military Training Command (훈련도감; 訓鍊都監). Personnel were selected from the equestrian training (훈국마), infantry (보군), and specialized troops (별기군).

In 1781 (5th year of King Jeongjo's reign), the 102 members of Martial Arts Department were divided into two units to guard the royal palaces: left (좌) and right (우), with each section consisting of 1 leader (총) and five subordinates (영). Each subordinate had ten people, so one subordinate had nine people, and one leader commanded five subordinate. When there was training, a chief of training (행수별감) was appointed by the head (통장) to lead the training.

By 1802 (2nd year of King Sunjo's reign), the department had a total of 198 personnel selected from the Hun'gukma (訓局馬), Bogun (步軍), and Byeolgigun (別技軍) units.

=== Martial Arts Special Guards ===
The military personnel of the Martial Arts Department were called the Martial Arts Special Guards (무예별감; 무감; Muyebyeolgam). It is said that the title of Martial Arts Special Guards was bestowed upon the ten training officers who accompanied King Seonjo during the Imjin War and returned with him to Hanyang, acknowledging their efforts. Then it was given to the 30 soldiers from the Military Training Division who guarded King Seonjo, and this title continued with the establishment of the Martial Arts Department in 1630. They guarded the palace gates and the king's residence, surrounding the king's carriage during royal processions. When guarding the palaces, one person stood at each of the left and right gates, and two people stood at the rear gate.

The Martial Arts Special Guards were selected from the Special Core Army (별기군) of the Military Training Command (훈련도감; Hullyeoldogam). The Martial Arts Special Guards consisted of skilled individuals with strong physical abilities and proficiency in techniques among the cavalry, infantry, and their affiliated personnel. They were constantly engaged in learning martial skills. At times, they were also dispatched as martial arts instructors to the Military Training Agency, Capital Garrison (금위영; 禁衛營), Royal Guards Command (어영청; 御營廳), and the Command of the Northern Approaches (총융청; 摠戎廳).

=== Offices ===
The composition of the Martial Arts Department consisted of the Chief Martial Arts Office (Muyecheong Daeryeong Mugam (무예청 대령 무감 (武藝廳待令武監) consisted of 46 members, while the Deputy chief martial arts office (Muyecheong Gadaeryeong Mugam (무예청 가대령 무감 (武藝廳假待令武監) had 40 members serving as guards (Siwi (시위, 侍衛). The remaining 87 members of the Gate Martial Arts Office (Munmu Muyecheong Mugam (문무무예청 무감 (門武藝廳武監) stood guard at various palace gates. The Men and women martial arts office (남여무예청) had 19 personnel, the Old and New martial arts office (구후무예청) had four personnel, and the Firearm martial arts office (화병무예청) had two personnel.

== Training ==
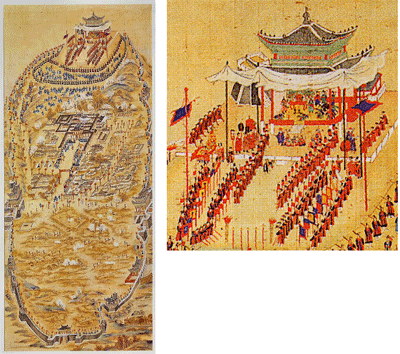
The painting of Seojangdae at night depicting King Jeongjo's visit to Hwaseong and leading military training.

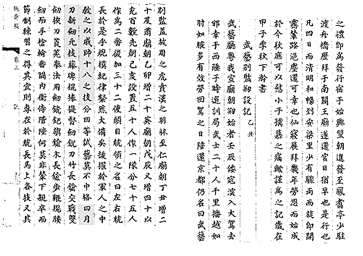
The shaded portion of 『Sunjego (純齋稿)』's "Martial Arts Byeolgam Changseolgi (武藝別監創設記)" makes it clear that the martial arts byeolgam was trained in the eighteen techniques.

During the Joseon era, the area of Namsan's Bokrok (present-day Yejang-dong and Jangchung-dong) was entirely military camps. The current Hanok Village was the headquarters of the Eoyeongcheong (어영청), and Jangchungdan Park was the headquarters of the Geumwiyeong (금위영), known as the "18 Martial Arts Acres" (십팔기터). The Martial Arts Special Guards military personnel trained at Bipajeong (currently Dongguk University) in spring, summer, and autumn, and at Hadogam (currently Dongdaemun History & Culture Park) during winter. They ensured the continuity of their lineage by enlisting their own sons in the Dae-nyeon-gun from an early age, allowing them to learn the Muyesinbo. Learning the Muyesinbo was considered impossible without starting martial arts training at a young age. (Currently, the Muyesinbo are designated as a separate category known as "Traditional Military Training" (전통군영무예) and have been designated as the 51st Seoul Intangible Cultural Property. The textbook, "Muyedobotongji," was inscribed on the UNESCO Memory of the World Register by North Korea in 2017.)

== Uniforms ==
Martial Arts Department soldiers wore green iron helmets and purple hoods, but their attire changed to red following the simplification of clothing on April 4, 1778. The 문무예청 (gate martial arts office) wore red-colored clothing with yellow straw hats (황초립) and tiger beards attached to their caps.

An excerpt from the first article of the Joseon Dynasty Annals for the second year of King Jeongjo, April 4 describes the uniform requirements for the Martial Arts Special Guards.

"The Martial Arts Special Guards shall wear a celestial hat (천익), a straw hat (초립), and a tiger beard (호수) without question when seated in the palace or on duty. On occasions other than guarding the gates, they shall wear a hood (두건) and a celestial hat (천익)."

— Joseon Dynasty Annals, second year of King Jeongjo, April 4.

Furthermore, the military manuscript called "Man-gi Yoram" from 1808 provides a more detailed description of the attire of the Martial Arts Special Guards.

"There are 46 members in the Daeryeong Muyecheong (Commanders of the Large Martial Arts), and 40 members in the Gadaeryeong Muyecheong (Commanders of the Great Martial Arts), all wearing red military uniforms. They carry swords only during guard duty. There are 87 members in the Mun Muyecheong (Civil Martial Arts Commanders), wearing red celestial hats (홍천익) and yellow straw hats (황초립), with tiger beards (호수) attached."

— "Man-gi Yoram"

The Chief Martial Arts Office and the Deputy Chief Martial Arts Office wore red military uniforms and carried swords while serving as guards. The remaining 87 members of the Gate Martial Arts Office (문무예청 ( Munmu Muyecheong Mugam (門武藝廳武監)) wore red-colored Hongcheolik and yellow Hwangchorip hats (黃草笠), with tiger beards attached to their caps, and the red cheollik (철릭, a type of traditional Korean garment).

The Men and women martial arts office, Old and new martial arts office, and Firearm martial arts office wore black-colored military uniforms. During guard duties, they wore the same uniforms as the gate martial arts office which were multicolored.

After the prohibition on wearing civilian clothing in 1883, all Martial Arts Special Guards were required to wear standard traditional military uniforms.

== Equipment ==
The Gate martial arts office stood guard at various palace gates, wielding spears and swords. According to the Man-gi Yoram, 58 members wielded muskets (조총), 29 members wielded Samreungjang (三稜杖), a three-sided cudgel used for striking offenders, while standing guard at the palace gates, and one-third of the members carried bows (삼릉장). The four superior heads (상두) carried a halberd (탁달, 脫鐸) and stood at the left, right, and rear gates without having swords. They were identifiable by their distinctive attire, which included red iron helmets, yellow chest plates, and swords known as yodo.

The Martial Arts Special Guards were proficient in the Muyesinbo, with the native sword (bongukgeom, 본국검) and crescent moon blade (woldo, 월도) which were considered the most important techniques. During the royal procession (대조회), when the royal guards (갑사) were in charge of protection, those who carried the straight sword (능장) would switch to staff (석전) or red rattan staff (주등장). When performing royal processions outside the capital, the chief of training (행수별감) from both sides would wear military uniforms and carry swords.

In 1883, after Joseon opened their doors, they were equipped with modern rifles and hwando (swords).

== See also ==
- Joseon Army
- Joseon Army (late 19th century)
- Joseon
- Korean martial arts
- Muyesinbo
- Muyedobotongji
- Eulmi Incident
