= Pyŏlgigun =

First Korean modernised military

The Pyŏlgigun, Byeolgigun, Gyoryeonbyeongdae, or Waepyeolgi (Korean: 별기군; Hanja: 別技軍, "Special Skills Force" or "Special Army") was the first modernised military force of Korea. First conceived in 1876, it was formed in 1881 and trained by Japanese officers led by Horimoto Reizō, military attaché at the Japanese legation. It received better treatment than the old Korean Army, whose soldiers' salaries were in arrears on account of the costs of the Byeolgigun. This led in 1882 to the Imo mutiny, in which Horimoto Reizō was tortured and murdered by disgruntled Korean soldiers.

== History ==
In 1876, the Japanese Empire had forcibly opened up Korea to the world with the Ganghwado treaty. Although the Korean government and royal court wasn't so keen on it, the country began to rapidly modernize, and thus the government had to follow suit. The government sent envoys to Japan, and China to study their military technology and thus had reached the conclusion that the armed forces should modernize-though some western rifles and gear were being shipped to korea post 1876(though it was mostly limited in numbers and scattered regiment by regiment)

In May 1881, as part of its plan to modernise the country, the Korean government and King Gojong of Korea invited the Japanese military attaché, Lieutenant Horimoto Reizō, to serve as an adviser in creating a modern army. From 80 to 100 young men from the former 'Five Military Garrisons' or 오군영 that were reintegrated into the Muwiyŏng and the Jangeoyŏng were hand-picked by the royal court and were to be given Japanese military training and make up the newly formed Special Skills Force. The recruits, after being selected, were trained directly under military governors and authorities like the Commandant of the Special kills Forces Kim No Hwan and Magistrate of Nam-Won Yun Ungnyŏl

Although due to its 1 year and two months long existence we cannot exactly know how or what these troops were, after the initial creation, the Gyoryeonbyeongdae is presumed to have been used as essentially a Royal guard of some sort despite being the first broadly 'modern' army in Korean history, as there is a 1881 record in the Annals of the Joseon Dynasty, that Gojong had summoned them to the Yeonmu-dae(연무대) for an ceremonial inspection.

However, there was resentment towards the formation on the part of the soldiers of the army units that were not integrated into the Gyoryeonbyeongdae who viewed it with envy as the formation was much better equipped and treated than themselves. More than 1,000 soldiers had been discharged in the process of overhauling the army; most were either old or disabled and the rest had not been given their pay in rice for thirteen months. Thus, some soldiers had come to bitterly despise the Gyoryeonbyeongdae, more specifically their Japanese Officers and the Min clan related commanders who reportedly 'sabotaged' their supply for their personal gain.

== Trivia ==
- Although the unit itself is widely misunderstood to be a separate unit than that of the Old Joseon Army, it was directly under the Mu-Wi-Yeong unit of the Armed Forces, and was commanded according to traditional military hierarchy and structure. Another common misconception is that it was led by the Japanese, however this is not exactly true. Only the de jure and de facto trainers on the ground were Japanese, and the rest of the Commanders were Korean, with the likes of Pandonnyongbusa(roughly translatable as Director of the Office of the Royal Family's Welfare.) Min Gyeom Ho
- The lower level officers and practically all of the troops, were not massacred immediately by other troops during the Imo Incident. After the initial mutiny, by the order of Grand Prince Regent Daewon, many returned to whatever unit they served in prior. Although it is still unconfirmed as to why the other troops let these men live, it is most likely possible that the non Byulgigun troops weren't that focused on slaughtering their brethren altogether and was focused primarily on the Yeoheung Min clan related officers, which were usually at the very top, not below anywhere else.

== Bibliography ==
- Keene, Donald (2002). Emperor of Japan: Meiji and His World, 1852–1912. New York: Columbia University Press. ISBN 0-231-12341-8.
- Kim, Djun Kil (2014). The History of Korea, 2nd Edition Greenwood. Santa Barbara, California: ABC-CLIO. ISBN 1-610-69582-8.
- Kim, Jinwung (2012). A History of Korea: From "Land of the Morning Calm" to States in Conflict. Indiana University Press. ISBN 0-253-00024-6.
- Nussbaum, Louis Frédéric (2002). Japan Encyclopedia (translated by Käthe Roth). Cambridge MA.: Harvard University Press. ISBN 0-674-01753-6.
