= Imo Incident =

1882 military uprising in Seoul, Joseon

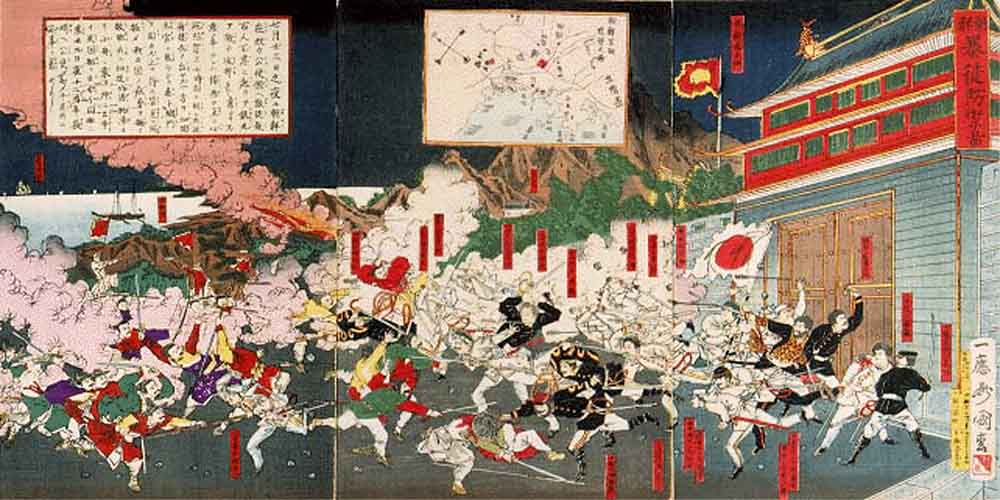
- Contemporary nishiki-e depicting the attack on the Japanese legation in Seoul

Korean name
- Hangul: 임오군란
- Hanja: 壬午軍亂
- RR: Imogullan
- MR: Imogullan

The Imo Incident, (Note: "Imo" refers to the 19th year in the sexagenary cycle, which was traditionally used in East Asia as a calendar and used to date significant events. It corresponds to the year 1882.) also sometimes known as the Imo Mutiny, Soldier's riot or Jingo-gunran in Japanese, was a violent uprising and riot in Seoul beginning in 1882, by soldiers of the Joseon Army who were later joined by disaffected members of the wider Korean population. The revolt broke out in part due to King Gojong's support for reform and modernization, as well as the employment of Japanese military advisors. Some sources credit rumors as the spark which ignited violence, where many Korean soldiers were worried by the prospect of incorporating Japanese officers in a new army structure. The trigger for the riot is largely attributed to a reaction about unpaid soldiers' wages, who found sand and bad rice in soldiers' rations. At the time, soldiers could be paid in rice.

The rioters killed many government officials, destroyed homes of high government ministers and occupied the Changdeokgung. They also turned on the members of the Japanese legation in the city, who barely escaped aboard the British ship HMS Flying Fish. During the day of rioting, a number of Japanese were murdered, including military advisor Horimoto Reizo. The rioters also attacked the home of Min Gyeom-ho, who held joint appointments of Minister of Military Affairs and high-level official of the Agency to Bestow Blessings, lynched lord Heungin, Yi Choe-eung and attempted to murder Queen Min, even reaching the Royal Palace. The poverty-stricken people of Seoul from Wangsim-li and Itaewon joined in the riot and Queen Min escaped to the home of Min Eung-sik by disguising herself as a lady of the court.

Some explain the flare-up of violence by pointing to provocative policies and conduct by Japanese military advisors who had been training the new Special Skills Force since 1881.

== Background ==
Before the 19th century, Korea pursued a strict policy of isolation. Except for official tributary missions to China and occasional diplomatic missions to Japan, which after the mid-18th century became fewer and confined to the island of Tsushima, Koreans were prohibited from leaving the country. All foreigners were barred entry into the country except for Chinese officials on diplomatic missions, and the Japanese who were only allowed to trade at waegwan enclaves in Busan. Foreign trade was mainly limited to China, conducted at designated locations along the Korean–Manchurian border and with Japan in Busan.

=== Korean politics ===
In January 1864, King Cheoljong died without a male heir and King Gojong ascended the throne at the age of 12. However, King Gojong was too young and the new king's father, Yi Ha-ŭng, became the Daewongun or Lord of the Great Court who ruled Korea in his son's name. Originally the term Daewongun referred to any person who was not actually the king but whose son took the throne. With his ascendancy to power the Daewongun initiated a set of reforms designed to strengthen the monarchy at the expense of the yangban class, he also pursued an isolationist policy and was determined to purge the kingdom of any foreign ideas that had infiltrated into the nation. In Korean history, the king's in-laws enjoyed great power and the Daewongun acknowledged that any future sons-in-law might threaten his authority. Therefore, he attempted to prevent any possible threat to his rule by selecting as a new queen for his son, an orphaned girl from among the Yŏhŭng Min clan, a clan which lacked powerful political connections.

With Queen Min as his daughter-in-law and the royal consort, the Daewongun felt secure in his power. However, after she had become queen, Min recruited all her relatives and had them appointed to influential positions in the name of the king. The Queen also allied herself with the Daewongun's political enemies, so that by late 1873 she had mobilized enough influence to oust the Daewongun from power. In October 1873, when the Confucian scholar Choe Ik-hyeon submitted a memorial to King Gojong urging him to rule in his own right, Queen Min seized the opportunity to force her father-in-law's retirement as regent. The departure of the Daewongun led to Korea's abandonment of its isolationist policy. Subsequently, the Treaty of Ganghwa in 1876 had led to the opening of Korea.

=== Implementation of the enlightenment policy ===
The Korean government immediately after the opening of the country to the outside world, pursued a policy of enlightenment aimed at achieving national prosperity and military strength through the doctrine of tongdo sŏgi, or Eastern ways and Western machines. To modernize their country, the Koreans tried selectively to accept and master Western technology while preserving their country's cultural values and heritage. After the Treaty of Ganghwa was signed, the court dispatched Kim Ki-su, a respected scholar and official to head a mission to Japan. Although Korean kings had sent emissaries to Japan in the past, this was the first such mission since 1810. Kim met a number of officials who showed him some of Japan's reforms and he reluctantly meet with the Japanese emperor. However, Kim left Japan without its modernization and reforms leaving much of an impression on him, and rather than using the trip as an opportunity to introduce Korea to the rapidly changing world as demonstrated by Japanese reform efforts, the mission was treated as one of the occasional missions sent to Japan in the interests of kyorin ('neighborly relations'). Kim Ki-su did present the King with the journal of his observations, titled Iltong kiyu (Record of a Journey to Japan).

It was another four years before the King sent another mission, in 1880. The mission was headed by Kim Hong-jip, who was a more enthusiastic observer of the reforms taking place in Japan. While in Japan, the Chinese diplomat Huang Zunxian presented him with a study called Chaoxian Celue (朝鲜策略; "A Strategy for Korea"). It warned of the threat to Korea posed by the Russians and recommended that Korea maintain friendly relations with Japan, which was at the time too economically weak to be an immediate threat, to work closely with China, and seek an alliance with the United States as a counterweight to Russia. After returning to Korea, Kim presented the document to King Gojong, who was so impressed with the document that he had copies made and distributed to his officials. Many conservatives were outraged by the proposal to seek alliance with Western barbarians or even to maintain friendly relations with Japan. Some even plotted a coup, the King responded by executing one prominent official and banishing others. The document became the basis of Korean foreign policy.

In January 1881, the government launched administrative reforms and established the T'ongni kimu amun ('Office for Extraordinary State Affairs') which was modeled on Chinese administrative structures. Under this overarching organization were 12 sa or agencies, dealing with relations with China (Sadae), diplomatic matters involving other foreign nations (Kyorin), military affairs (Kunmu), border administration (Pyŏnjŏng), foreign trade (T'ongsang), military ordnance (Kunmul), machinery production (Kigye), shipbuilding (Sŏnham), coastal surveillance (Kiyŏn), personnel recruitment (Chŏnsŏn), special procurement (Iyong), and foreign-language schooling (Ŏhak). In May 1881, until their return home in September of that year, a technical mission was sent to Japan to survey its modernized facilities. They traveled all over Japan inspecting administrative, military, educational, and industrial facilities. In October, another small group went to Tianjin to study modern weapons manufacturing, and Chinese technicians were invited to manufacture weapons in Seoul.

=== Japanese insecurities over Korea ===
During the 1880s, discussions about Japanese national security focused on the issue of Korean reform. The discourse over the two were interlinked, as the German military adviser Major Jacob Meckel stated, Korea was a "dagger pointed at the heart of Japan". What made Korea of strategic concern was not merely its proximity to Japan but its inability to defend itself against outsiders. If Korea were truly independent, it posed no strategic problem to Japan's national security but if the country remained backward and uncivilized it would remain weak and consequently would be inviting prey for foreign domination. The Korean Peninsula represented the most likely point on the Asian mainland from which an naval invasion of Japan could be launched, just as the Mongol Empire unsuccessfully invaded Japan in the 13th century after conquering Korea. The importance of Korea was reinforced by the Japanese experiences in the Imjin War in the late 16th century. As early as 1873, influential Japanese generals and statesmen such as Saigō Takamori had called for an invasion of Korea.

The political consensus in Japan was that Korean independence lay, as it had been for Meiji Japan, through the importation of "civilization" from the West. Korea required a program of self-strengthening like the post-Restoration reforms enacted in Japan. The Japanese interest in the reform of Korea was not purely altruistic. Not only would these reforms enable Korea to resist foreign intrusion, which was in Japan's direct interest, but in being a conduit of change, they would also have opportunity to play a larger role on the peninsula. To Meiji leaders, the issue was not whether Korea should be reformed but how reform might be accomplished. There was a choice of adopting a passive role requiring the cultivation of reformist elements within Korea and rendering them assistance whenever possible, or adopting a more aggressive policy, actively interfering in Korean politics to assure that reform took place. Many advocates of reform in Japan, swung between these two positions.

Japan in the early 1880s was weak, as a result of internal uprisings and samurai rebellions during the previous decade. The country was also struggling financially with inflation as a result of these internal factors. Subsequently, the Meiji government adopted a passive policy, encouraging the Korea court to follow the Japanese model but offering little concrete assistance except for the dispatch of the small military mission headed by Lieutenant Horimoto Reizo to train the Pyŏlgigun. What worried the Japanese was the activities of the Chinese, who appeared to be thwarting the fragile group of reformers in Korea. The Qing government had loosened its hold over Korea in 1876, when the Japanese succeeded in establishing a legal basis for Korean independence. However, Li Hongzhang and many other Chinese high officials were alarmed by the Japanese annexation of the Ryukyu kingdom, from their perspective what had happened to this former tributary state could happen to another as well.

=== Shufeldt treaty ===
After 1879, China's relations with Korea came under the authority of Li Hongzhang, who had emerged as one of the most influential figures in China after playing an important role during the Taiping Rebellion, and an advocate of the self-strengthening movement. In 1879, Li was appointed as governor-general of Zhili Province and the imperial commissioner for the northern ports. He was in charge of China's Korea policy and urged Korean officials to adopt China's own self-strengthening program to strengthen their country in response of foreign threats, to which King Gojong was receptive. The Chinese were wary of the Japanese intentions and sought to thwart Japanese influence on the peninsula after the conclusion of the Gangwha Treaty. The United States provided a possible solution: Li concluded that if he encouraged Korea to enter into treaty talks with the Americans, China could use the United States to offset Japan's growing influence. The Americans had shown an interest in entering into treaty negotiations with the Koreans and had dispatched Commodore Robert Shufeldt to East Asia waters. Shufeldt had first visited Japanese officials in 1880, to see if they would mediate between American officials and the Koreans, but the Japanese did not respond to his offer. In 1880, following Chinese advice, King Gojong decided to establish diplomatic ties with the United States, which was a break with tradition. Shufeldt then traveled to Tianjin, where he met with Li Hongzhang, who negotiated on behalf of the Koreans at the talks. After negotiations through Chinese mediation (1881–1882), the Treaty of Peace, Amity, Commerce, and Navigation was formally signed between the United States and Korea in Incheon on May 22, 1882.

The 14-article document provided for the protection of shipwrecked sailors, coal supplies for American vessels entering Korea, trading rights in selected Korean ports, the exchange of diplomatic representatives, granted the Americans extraterritoriality rights and most-favored-nation status in Korea. In return, the United States agreed not to import opium or arms into the country, Korean tariffs were kept high, extraterritoriality was made provisional upon the reform of Korean laws and judicial procedures to conform to America's, and there was no mention of permitting missionary activity. However, two significant issues were raised by the treaty, the first concerned Korea's status as an independent nation. During the talks with the Americans, Li Hongzhang insisted that the treaty contain an article declaring that Korea was a dependency of China and argued that the country had long been a tributary state of China. But Shufeldt firmly opposed such an article, arguing that an American treaty with Korea should be based on the Treaty of Ganghwa, which stipulated that Korea was an independent state. A compromise was finally reached, with Shufeldt and Li agreeing that the King of Korea would notify the U.S. president in a letter that Korea had special status as a tributary state of China. The treaty between Korean government and the United States became the model for all treaties between it and other Western countries. Korea, later signed similar trade and commerce treaties with Great Britain and Germany in 1883, with Italy and Russia in 1884, and with France in 1886. Subsequently, commercial treaties were concluded with other European countries.

=== Establishment of the Pyŏlgigun ===
In 1881 as part of their plan to modernize Korea, King Gojong and his consort Queen Min had invited the Japanese military attaché Lieutenant Horimoto Reizō to serve as an adviser in creating a modern army. Eighty to one hundred young and fit men (Note: Sources differ on the exact number of soldiers that made up the Special Skills Force, some sources state there were 80 members while others state there were 100.) of all former Five Army Garrisons to be given Japanese military training and a formation called the Pyŏlgigun ('Special Skills Force') was established. In January 1882, the government also reorganized the existing five-army garrison structure into the Muwiyŏng ('Capital Guards Garrison') and the Jangeoyŏng ('Capital Garrison' or 'Brave Defense Garrison') post the 80~100 men were enrolled into the Pyŏlgigun However, there was resentment towards the Pyŏlgigun on the part of the soldiers of the regular army who were envious of the formation as it was much better equipped and treated than they were. Additionally, more than 1000 soldiers had been discharged in the process of overhauling the army, most of them were either old or disabled and the rest had not been given their pay in rice for 13 months.

In June, King Gojong having been informed of the situation, ordered that a month's allowance of rice be given to the soldiers. He directed Min Gyeom-ho, the overseer of government finances and the Queen Min's nephew, to handle the matter. Min, in turn, handed the matter over to his steward who sold the good rice he had been given and used the money to buy millet that he mixed with sand and bran. As a result, the rice became so rotten and foul smelling as being inedible.

== Events of the incident ==
=== Initial riot ===
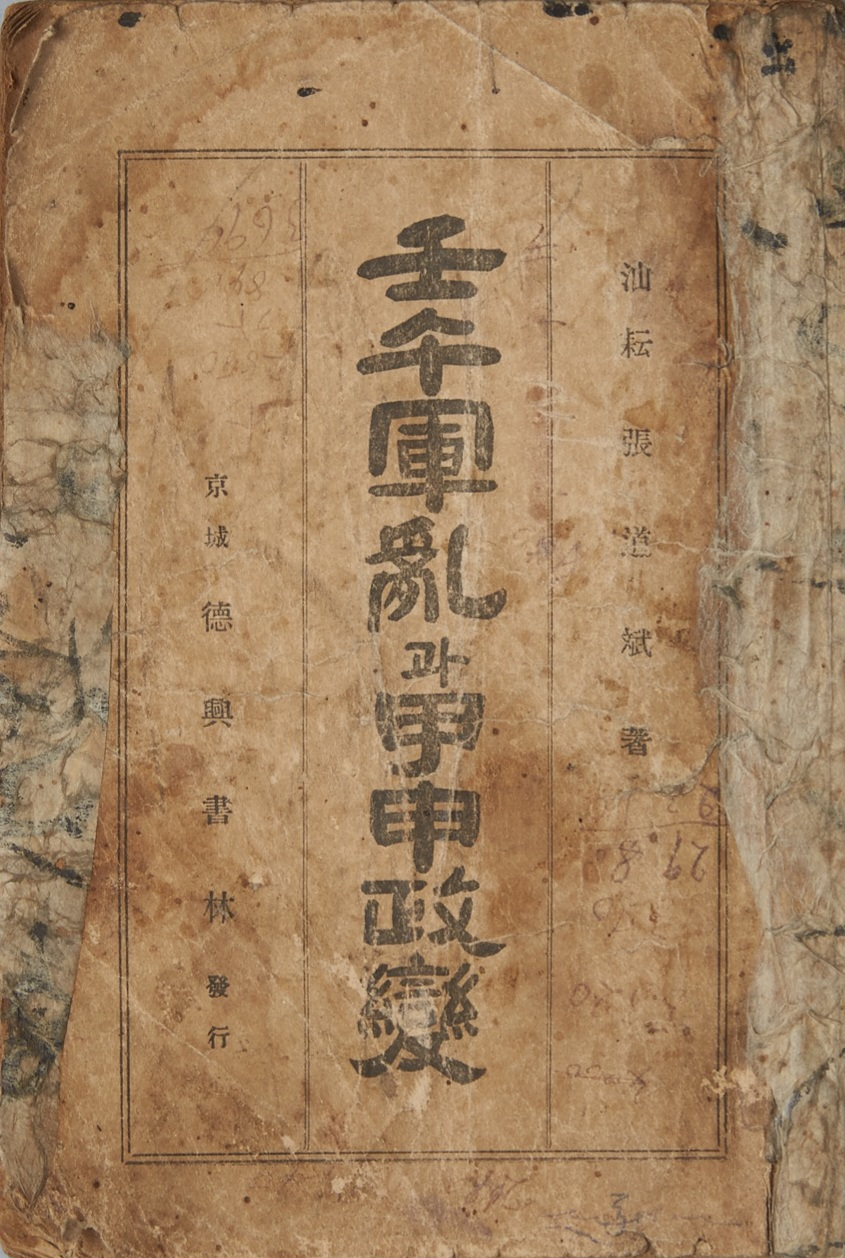
The book, Imo Incident and Gapsin Coup

The distribution of the alleged rice infuriated the soldiers. On July 23, 1882, the riot broke out in Uigeumbu. The enraged soldiers then headed for the residence of Min Gyeom-ho, whom they had suspected of having swindled them out of their rice. Min on hearing word of the revolt, ordered the police to arrest some of the ringleaders and announced that they would be executed the next morning. Min Gyeom-ho assumed that this would serve as a warning to the others. However, after learning what had transpired, the rioters broke into Min's house to take vengeance, as he was not at his residence the rioters vented their frustrations by destroying his furniture and other possessions.

The rioters then moved on to an armory from which they stole weapons and ammunition, they were now better armed than ever before in their careers as soldiers. The rioters then headed for the prison and after overpowering the guards, they released not only the men who had been arrested that day by Min Gyeom-ho but also many political prisoners as well. Min, who was in the royal palace, now summoned the army to quell the rebellion but it had become too late to suppress the mutiny. The original body of rioters had been swelled by the poor of the city and other malcontents and as a result, the revolt had assumed major proportions.

=== Flight of the Japanese legation ===
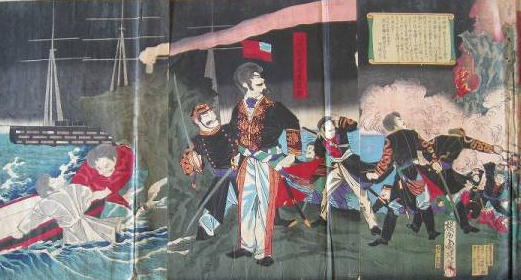
"The Korean Uprising of 1882" — woodblock print by Toyohara Chikanobu, 1882.

The rioters now turned their attention to the Japanese. One group of rioters headed to Lieutenant Horimoto's quarters and took turns in stabbing the military instructor, administering many small wounds until they slowly killed him. Another group, some 3,000 strong, armed themselves with weapons taken from a looted depot and headed for the Japanese legation. Inside the legation was the minister to Korea, Hanabusa Yoshitada, seventeen members of his staff and ten legation police officers. The mob surrounded the legation shouting its intention of killing all the Japanese inside.

Hanabusa gave orders to burn the legation and important documents were set on fire. The flames quickly spread, and under cover of the flames and smoke, members of the legation escaped through a rear gate. The Japanese fled to the harbor where they boarded a boat which took them down the Han River to Incheon. At first they took refuge with the Incheon commandant but when word arrived of the events in Seoul, the attitude of their hosts changed and the Japanese realized they were no longer safe. They escaped to the harbor during rain and were pursued by Korean soldiers. Six Japanese were killed, while another five were seriously wounded. The survivors carrying the wounded, then boarded a small boat and headed for the open sea where three days later they were rescued by a British surveyor ship, HMS Flying Fish.

=== Attack on the royal palace ===
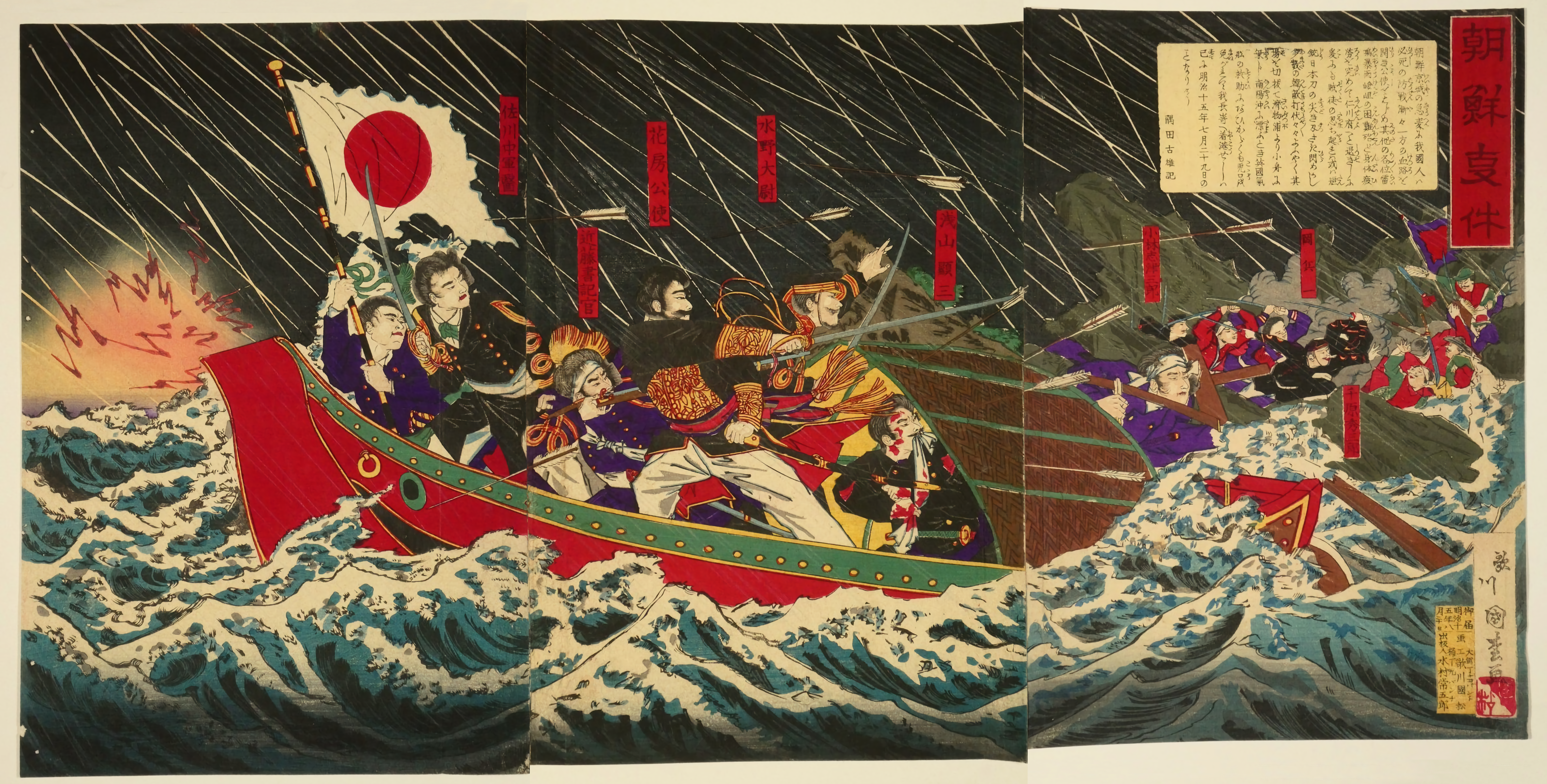
Ukiyo-e depicting the flight of the Japanese legation in 1882.

The day after the attack on the Japanese legation, on July 24, the rioters forced their way into the royal palace where they found and killed Min Gyeom-ho, as well as a dozen other high-ranking officers including Heungin-gun Yi Choe-Heung, the older brother of the Daewongun, who was previously critical of Korea's isolation policy. They also searched for Queen Min intending to kill her because of her membership to the hated Min family, and as a result of the perceived the corruption in the government which was completely under her control. The queen narrowly escaped, however, dressed as an ordinary lady of the court and was carried on the back of a faithful guard who claimed she was his sister. She found refuge in the home of Min Eung-sik in Chungju, Chungcheong Province.

== Aftermath ==
In the midst of the chaos, the regent father of the king, the Heungseon Daewongun, who had supported soldiers' complaints, took power and tried to re-establish order. The Japanese government sent Ambassador Hanabusa back to Seoul with four naval warships, three cargo ships and a battalion of armed soldiers.

=== Japanese response ===
There was significant indignation in Japan at the treatment of its nationals and the events were seen as an affront to the reputation of the Japanese nation. The foreign office under Inoue Kaoru commanded Hanabusa to return to Seoul and meet with senior Korean officials and to persuade them to set a date by which the rioters would be brought to justice in a manner which was satisfactory to the Japanese government. If the rioters were to make surprise attacks on the Japanese, they would then be compelled to use military force to against them, regardless of what measures the Korean government might have taken. Hanabusa was instructed that if the Koreans showed any signs of hiding the perpetrators and not punishing them or if they refused to take part in any discussions with the Japanese, this would constitute a clear breach of peace. In that case, a final letter would be sent to the Korean government by an envoy, indicting it for its crimes and then Japanese forces would occupy the port of Chempulpo and await further orders. Hanabusa was advised that if China or any other nation offered to mediate, it should be refused. The instructions, however, concluded on a conciliatory note, in that the Japanese government did not consider that the Korean government had intentionally harmed peaceful relations and there should a sincere attempt to restore the traditional good relations between the two countries. The incident could even provide a means of securing a lasting peace and in view of Korean national feelings, the Japanese had judged that it was premature to send a punitive expedition. The minister Hanabusa would only return to Seoul and be protected by army and navy troops, because of the concern that there was no predicting what further violence might be unleashed by the rioters.

Nevertheless, despite optimism of a peaceful resolution to the crisis, the Japanese government authorized the call-up of reserves in the beginning of August. Inoue Kaoru also notified western ministers in Tokyo of the government's decision to send troops and warships to Korea to protect Japanese citizens. He emphasized that the government's intentions were entirely peaceful, however, an offer by the American government to mediate was immediately declined. The emperor, worried about the situation in Korea, dispatched Chamberlain Yamaguchi Masasada to the country as a personal envoy. He remained there until the Treaty of Chemulpo was signed.

=== Chinese response ===
The Chinese received word about the rebellion through Li Shuchang, the Chinese minister in Tokyo in Japan. On August 1, Zhang Shuosheng dispatched ships of Beiyang Fleet under the command of Ding Ruchang to Korea with Ma Jianzhong on board by request of Joseon's Queen. About 4,500 troops, under General Wu Changqing arrived in Korea. The Chinese troops effectively regained control and quelled the rebellion and were then stationed at various points throughout Seoul. In the aftermath of rebellion, the Daewongun was accused of fomenting the rebellion and its violence, and was arrested by Chinese troops. On September 25, three high-ranking Chinese naval officers paid a courtesy call on the Daewongun and as they were leaving they asked him to attend an important meeting at their residence in the city. The Daewongun was obliged by rules of etiquette to return the call and went to the Chinese encampment the next day, as requested. Initially, there were the usual exchanges of politenesses between the two parties but at a signal, (Note: Which was the lifting of a wine glass in a toast to the long life of the Daewongun.) Chinese troops burst into the room seized the Daewongun and put him into a palanquin. He was carried off to the warship Weiyuan and while still inside the palanquin, was taken to China. He was not released from the palanquin until the Weiyuan reached Tianjin. In Tianjian, he was interrogated by Li Hongzhang, who unsuccessfully tried to make him admit responsibility for the events surrounding the uprising. Li ordered the Daewongun put back in his palanquin and he was carried off to a town about sixty miles southwest of Beijing, where for three years he was confined to one room and kept under strict surveillance.

== Consequences ==
After the Imo Incident, early reform efforts in Korea suffered a major setback. The aftermath of the event also brought the Chinese into the country where they began to directly interfere in Korean internal affairs.

=== Reassertion of Chinese influence ===
After the incident, China reasserted its suzerainty over Korea and stationed troops in Seoul, commanded by Wu Changqing. The Chinese undertook several initiatives to gain significant influence over the Korean government. As well as stationing troops in Korea, two special advisers on foreign affairs representing Chinese interests were dispatched in Korea; the German Paul Georg von Möllendorff, who was a close confidant of Li Hongzhang, and the Chinese diplomat Ma Jianzhong. Wu Changqing, together with a staff of officers, took over the training of the Korean army and additionally provided the Koreans with 1,000 rifles, two cannons and 10,000 rounds of ammunition. Furthermore, the Ch'in'gunyŏng, (Capital Guards Command) was also created consisting of four barracks designated the right, left, front, and rear; this new Korean military formation was trained along Chinese lines by Yuan Shikai.

The Chinese further supervised the creation of a Korean Maritime Customs Service in 1883, with von Möellendorff as its head. Korea was again reduced to a tributary state of China with King Gojong unable to appoint diplomats without Chinese approval and troops stationed in Seoul in order to protect Chinese interests in the country. The Chinese government began to turn its former tributary state into a semi-colony and its policy toward Korea substantially changed to a new imperialistic one where the suzerain state demanded certain privileges in her vassal state.

In October 1882, the two countries signed a treaty stipulating that Korea was a dependency of China and granted Chinese merchants the right to conduct overland and maritime business freely within Korean borders. It also gave them substantial advantages over the Japanese and Westerners and also granted the Chinese unilateral extraterritoriality privileges in civil and criminal cases. China also obtained concessions in Korea, notably the Chinese concession of Incheon. Under the treaty the number of Chinese merchants and traders greatly increased, striking a severe blow to Korean merchants. Although it allowed Koreans reciprocally to trade in Beijing the agreement was not a treaty but was in effect issued as a regulation for a vassal, it also reasserted Korea's dependency on China.

=== Japanese military buildup ===
The crisis in Korea persuaded top civilian leaders in Japan that it was undesirable to postpone expenditure on a larger military. During the 1870s, the Japanese government was faced with internal uprisings and samurai rebellions, which had led to rampant inflation and financial difficulties. Consequently, the government had decided in late 1880 to stabilize the currency by increased taxation and financial retrenchment. However, the Imo mutiny had underscored the urgency of military expansion, as Japan's limited military and naval power was made apparent. In contrast to the Chinese who had quickly dispatched an expeditionary force to Seoul, where they quickly established order and controlled the situation with their military superiority over the rioters, the Japanese had been forced to pursue a reactive or passive policy.

To many in the country, including Yamagata Aritomo, the lesson was clear — that a conscript army of forty thousand men was no longer adequate to Japan's needs and neither was a navy lacking transport ships to dispatch troops abroad: were hostilities to break out with Korea or China, the country would be in a serious predicament. In September 1882, Iwakura Tomomi had also informed the Dajōkan that increased naval strength was essential for a maritime country like Japan. If Japan went to war, it would not have enough vessels to protect the home islands and if it used its fleet to protect the home islands it would not be able to mount an attack overseas. As the Chinese were building up their naval forces, and Japan would be unable to defend itself against China in a possible future conflict. Iwakura argued that it was of the utmost urgency to spend more on the navy even if this meant raising taxes.

Even Finance Minister Matsukata Masayoshi, who had implemented the fiscal retrenchment policy, agreed that financial resources had to be found for a military and naval buildup if the international situation required. Spurred on by anxieties over China, Japanese military expenditures grew steadily in the 1880s. In 1880 the share of military spending had amounted to 19 percent of total government expenditures, in 1886 it had risen to 25 percent and by 1890 it stood at 31 percent. In 1883, plans called for a substantial expansion of the Imperial Japanese Army with twenty-eight infantry regiments, including four imperial guard regiments; seven cavalry battalions; seven field artillery battalions, each consisting of two field-gun battalions and one mountain-gun battalion; seven engineer battalions; and seven transport battalions. The proposed composition of forces with increased cavalry, engineer and transport units was intended to reorganize the army as a force capable of fighting on the continent. The Imperial Japanese Navy also developed its own plans with the expansion of the fleet to forty-two vessels, thirty-two of which would have to be newly constructed. Within the next two years, twelve new vessels were purchased or put under construction.

=== Eventual confrontation ===
In 1884, pro-Japanese Korean reformers attempted to overthrow the pro-Chinese government with Japanese military backing. China easily defeated the coup, leading to a period of total Chinese supremacy in Korean affairs. To avoid immediate war, China and Japan signed an agreement in 1885 to withdraw their armies from Korea and require prior notification. This incident served as a crucial powderkeg that led to the First Sino-Japanese War in 1894.

== Bibliography ==
- Duus, Peter (1998). The Abacus and the Sword: The Japanese Penetration of Korea. Berkeley: University of California Press. ISBN 0-52092-090-2.
- Iwao, Seiichi. (2002). Dictionnaire historique du Japon (Vol. I), (Vol. II) (with Teizō Iyanaga, Susumu Ishii, Shōichirō Yoshida et al.). Paris: Maisonneuve & Larose. ISBN 978-2-7068-1632-1; OCLC 51096469
- Kang, Jae-eun (2002). The Land of Scholars : Two Thousand Years of Korean Confucianism (translated by Suzanne Lee). Paramus, New Jersey: Homa & Sekey Books. ISBN 1-931-90737-4.
- Keene, Donald (2002). Emperor of Japan: Meiji and His World, 1852–1912. New York: Columbia University Press. ISBN 0-231-12341-8.
- Kim, Jinwung (2012). A History of Korea: From "Land of the Morning Calm" to States in Conflict. New York: Indiana University Press. ISBN 978-0-253-00024-8.
- Nussbaum, Louis Frédéric (2002). Japan Encyclopedia (translated by Käthe Roth). Cambridge MA.: Harvard University Press. ISBN 0-674-01753-6.
- Pratt, Keith L.; Rutt, Richard; Hoare, James (1999). Korea: A Historical and Cultural Dictionary. Psychology Press, Routledge. ISBN 978-0700704637.
- Rhee, Syngman (2001). The Spirit of Independence: a Primer of Korean Modernization and Reform (translated by Han-Kyo Kim). Honolulu: University of Hawaii Press. ISBN 0-824-82349-4.
- Seth, Michael J. (2010). A Concise History of Modern Korea: From the Late Nineteenth Century to the Present. Rowman & Littlefield. ISBN 978-0-742-56713-9.
- Seth, Michael J. (2011). A History of Korea: From Antiquity to the Present. Rowman & Littlefield. ISBN 978-0-742-56715-3.
- Tsuru, Shigeto (2000). The Political Economy of the Environment: the Case of Japan. Vancouver: University of British Columbia. ISBN 0-774-80763-6.
