= Science and technology in Vietnam =

The main managing agency responsible for science and technology (S&T) in Vietnam is the Ministry of Science and Technology (MOST). MOST's responsibilities include scientific research, technology development and innovation activities; development of science and technology potentials; intellectual property; standards, metrology and quality control; atomic energy, radiation and nuclear safety; and state management on public services in fields under the Ministry’s management as stipulated by law.

== Background ==
The origins of science and technology in Vietnam can be traced to rudimentary developments dating to around 20,000 BCE, during the Sơn Vi culture, a Late Paleolithic culture in Vietnam characterized by stone tools associated with the manufacture of implements from river pebbles. Archaeologists have discovered pebble tools similar to those found elsewhere in the world dating from the same period in the provinces of Sơn La and Phú Thọ. By knapping stone to produce sharp-edged tools for hunting and gathering and self-defense against potential threats, these early inhabitants took some of the first steps toward applying rudimentary knowledge to the transformation of the material world. Following the Stone Age, the Đông Sơn culture, a Bronze Age culture dating from approximately 1000 BCE to 100 CE, emerged in the Red River valley of northern Vietnam.

The culture marked a high point in metallurgy and sophisticated bronze casting, combined with intensive wet-rice cultivation, the domestication of livestock, poultry, waterfowl, and other animals within the rice civilization, as well as advanced seafaring and shipbuilding techniques. Đông Sơn bronze drums, with their elaborate geometric motifs and complex mathematical symmetry, reflect not only a sophisticated aesthetic sensibility but also advanced control of furnace temperatures and mold-casting techniques. Because of the prominence of Đông Sơn bronze casting, it has sometimes been mistakenly assumed that its inhabitants were unfamiliar with iron smelting and forging. In fact, archaeologists have discovered numerous iron weapons and tools, as well as iron slag, at Đông Sơn sites, indicating that ironworking existed alongside bronze casting. At the Gò Chiền Vậy site in Hoài Đức, Hanoi, part of the well-known Vườn Chuối archaeological complex, an iron hoe dating to approximately 2,400 years ago was discovered, providing direct evidence of ironworking technology during the Đông Sơn period.

Particularly notable is the axe from burial M.37. It is a cast-iron axe produced by casting and still preserves two distinct casting seams. Archaeologists have also discovered a fragment of a cast-iron hoe. Thus, the Đông Sơn people were familiar not only with iron forging, carried out below the melting temperature of iron alloys, but also with cast iron technology, in which molten iron was poured into molds to produce tools. Đông Sơn metalworkers presumably constructed blast furnace-type furnaces capable of reaching temperatures sufficient to melt iron, through furnace design and possibly advances in bellows technology, nearly 2,000 years before the technique arrived in the West. European metalworkers did not master cast-iron technology until approximately 1300.

The Đông Sơn culture was characterized by intensive wet-rice agriculture, the domestication of water buffalo and pigs, fishing and seafaring, and, most notably, sophisticated bronze-casting techniques exemplified by the characteristic Đông Sơn bronze drums, decorated with geometric patterns, scenes of warfare, animals, and boats. Legends surrounding the era of the Hùng kings, including the iron horse of Saint Gióng, the construction of Cổ Loa Citadel, and the magic crossbow, suggest ancient traditions concerning metallurgy, military engineering, and large-scale construction. Following the Đông Sơn period, Vietnam entered a prolonged period of conflict with China, beginning with the Qin–Vietnam War. Through contact and exchange, various technologies and scientific developments associated with the Han dynasty—recorded in Chinese sources, including negative numbers in mathematics, seismological instruments, advances in metallurgy, junk-type vessels, and turtle carts—were transmitted southward into Vietnam. Vietnamese medical practices likewise combined indigenous materials and knowledge with techniques associated with traditional Chinese medicine, contributing to the development of Vietnamese traditional medicine.

In shipbuilding, Chinese texts record the existence of so-called "copper ships" in Jiaozhou, the Han Chinese name for the region corresponding to northern Vietnam, at least 1,500 years before the emergence of copper-sheathed vessels in Britain: "[...] in the river there are copper ships cast by the Việt king; when the river tide recedes, people can see them." Another account states: "The Việt people cast copper into boats; when the waters of rivers and lakes recede, they can be seen." These ancient Vietnamese copper ships may have consisted of wooden hulls covered with a thin layer of copper, perhaps developed in response to the severe problem of shipworm infestation in tropical waters. Without such protection, wooden hulls could deteriorate rapidly, requiring frequent replacement of bottom planks. Joseph Needham suggested that, if this interpretation is correct, copper-sheathed junks may have originated from an indigenous tradition rather than from the vessels of Lake Nemi.

The development of watertight compartments in shipbuilding has been attributed to shipyards in Jiaozhou during the period associated with Lu Xun (4th–5th centuries CE). This technique may have formed part of the maritime shipbuilding tradition of the Gulf of Tonkin at the time. Such bulkheads could prevent water from flooding the entire vessel when the hull was damaged. Sailors could isolate a flooded compartment and pump out the water, allowing the vessel to remain afloat and return to a place of safety. Two boat outriggers excavated at Hà Mãn in Thuận Thành, Bắc Ninh province, provide evidence for the use of structural partitions as early as the late Đông Sơn period, around the 2nd–3rd centuries CE. The partitions of the Hà Mãn boat apparently served to connect the strakes of the hulls rather than to isolate watertight compartments. Nevertheless, the development from the Hà Mãn structural partitions to the use of a keel and watertight bulkheads in vessels associated with Lu Xun may have been separated by only a relatively short step.

Following the Dong Son period, Vietnam came into an extended period of conflict with China beginning with the Baiyue-Qin War. Via contact, many other Han discoveries that were translated into Chinese (negative numbers in math, seismometers, advancements in metallurgy, junk ships, and wheelbarrows to name just a few) made their way south to Vietnam. Vietnamese medical discoveries employed native ingredients that had incorporated practices from Chinese traditional medicine.

Vietnam also created an imperial examination system which produced a scholar-bureaucrat class of scientific researchers and publications. In the Battle of Bạch Đằng in 938 when Ngô Quyền developed a technique of sinking intruding Chinese navy fleets. The same original technique of sinking naval fleets developed by Ngô Quyền was later employed by Vietnamese generals to repel the Mongol invasions of Vietnam, an empire that would later go on to rule much of China, Russia, Europe and the Arab world.

Science and technology during the Lý dynasty developed alongside the consolidation of the independent Đại Việt state and encompassed a wide range of fields, including architecture, mechanical engineering, metallurgy, military technology, and maritime technology. Planners during the reign of Emperor Lý Thái Tổ employed a method of collineation measurement to carefully determine the locations and orientations of structures within the imperial citadel of Thăng Long. This method formed part of the broader “process” of imperial capital planning used by Chinese dynasties such as the Song and Yuan. It involved surveying a straight line through three points, using natural landmarks in combination with artificial markers, and applying the principle of similar triangles on an urban scale. In the case of the Thăng Long Citadel, Tản Viên Mountain, Nùng Mountain, Tam Mountain, Khán Mountain, and other peaks served as natural landmarks.

In mechanical engineering, machines were not only employed in production but were also designed for ceremonial and spiritual activities. According to the Sùng Thiện Diên Linh stele, during the reign of Emperor Lý Nhân Tông (1066–1128), he ordered the construction of the Quảng Chiếu lantern pavilion:

“Erect a high platform at Quảng Chiếu; facing the courtyard before the Đoan Môn Gate, set up a pillar in the center and seven tiers outside. A dragon-shaped body coils around and supports golden lotuses; embroidered silk lanterns enclose auspicious flowers. Conceal machinery beneath the ground and set the wheels turning; let the light blaze beneath the heavens, dazzling like the sun.”

According to scholars Phạm Văn Triệu and Phạm Lê Huy, this Quảng Chiếu lantern pavilion was a form of single-column structure, with the central column functioning as a rotating shaft supported by a stone bearing. Other rotating mechanical devices also existed, including the “Thôi luân vũ đình” (a rotating stage that could be pushed to turn), dating to the reign of Lý Nhân Tông, and the “Diên Mệnh” lantern, whose pennants and banners could be made to move, dating to the reign of Lý Thần Tông.

The Lý court went beyond monumental mechanical devices and also created highly sophisticated mechanical figures, or automatons, capable of performing relatively complex movements in response to commands: “A monk was carved, his body clad in a cassock; a concealed mechanism moved a lever and raised a mallet to produce a sound. Upon hearing the teaching, his face became solemn; gazing upon the sage, he bent his back and bowed his head.”

Metallurgy also developed significantly, as demonstrated by the casting of large bells such as the Sùng Thiện Diên Linh temple bell, reportedly weighing as much as 6–7 tonnes. To prepare for possible conflict with the Song dynasty, in 1106 Lý Nhân Tông ordered the construction of a type of vessel known as the Vĩnh Long (永隆), which had two compartments. In 1124, the emperor commissioned another type, the Tường Quang (祥光), also featuring two compartments. These were probably large seagoing vessels with two decks, allowing them to carry substantial quantities of cargo.

Science and technology under the Trần dynasty subsequently built upon the achievements of the Lý period and made significant advances in military technology, medicine, astronomy, and calendrical science.

In response to the wars against the Mongol–Yuan forces, the Trần dynasty placed considerable emphasis on improving weapons and developing techniques for manufacturing gunpowder weapons. Modern popular media often describes Hồ Nguyên Trừng as the father of Vietnamese firearms and artillery. However, the Thần Từ Cổ Tích stele, in the appendix Lịch Đại Gia Ban, compiled by Trương Hán Siêu in 1312, already mentions firearms and ammunition: “captured the rebellious Chế Chí, seizing elephants, horses, weapons, guns and shots.”

Thus, the Trần dynasty was familiar with firearms and ammunition by 1312. This was 25 years after the earliest mention of firearms in the History of Yuan, 15 years after the date attributed to the Shangdu hand cannon—the oldest surviving metal firearm currently known—approximately 30 years before the earliest illustrations of firearms in European books, and 62 years before the birth of Hồ Nguyên Trừng.

Nearly 80 years after Trương Hán Siêu's inscription, firearms produced a decisive moment in the century-long conflict between Đại Việt and Champa. In 1390, the Cham king Chế Bồng Nga was struck by a projectile fired by troops under the command of the Trần general Trần Khát Chân and was killed. The battle took place along a section of the Luộc River, with Chế Bồng Nga aboard the royal vessel while Trần Khát Chân's troops lay in ambush on the riverbank. The course of the battle suggests that Trần-period firearms possessed sufficient accuracy and range to accurately engage an individual vessel from a distance of several hundred metres. The projectile also had sufficient energy to penetrate the vessel's wooden planking while retaining enough kinetic energy to cause a fatal injury.

In addition, during the medieval period, the design of Vietnamese armour and helmets took shape and was depicted in sculptures and reliefs preserved in temples. In naval warfare, the Vietnamese developed the Mông đồng, a type of warship used by naval forces.

In medicine, Tuệ Tĩnh systematized knowledge of indigenous medicinal plants under the principle of “Nam dược trị Nam nhân” (“Southern medicines for Southern people”), laying the foundations for traditional Vietnamese medicine. In astronomy and calendrical science, Đặng Lộ successfully constructed the Linh Lung Nghi, a sophisticated and precise astronomical observation instrument, and adapted the Yuan dynasty's Shoushi calendar by means of the Hiệp Kỷ calendar to better suit Vietnam. Another Trần-period figure described as knowledgeable in calendrical science was Trần Nguyên Đán. He compiled the Bách thế thông kỷ thư, a work concerning calendrical systems and astronomical phenomena throughout successive dynasties.

In the 15th century Vietnamese scholar Hồ Nguyên Trừng was known for his innovations on firearms and cannons and helped transfer knowledge of Vietnamese firearm technology once living in exile in China. Firearm and cannon technology developed by the Vietnamese would prove vital to the conquest of Champa by the Đại Việt in the Cham-Vietnamese War of 1471 and overall Vietnamese matchlocks during this period were considered world-class not only with Ming China but also European observers of the Trịnh–Nguyễn civil war. By the 1800s, Nguyễn rulers such as Emperor Minh Mạng claimed the legacy of Confucianism and China's Han dynasty for Vietnam in relation to its neighbouring states.

During the reign of Emperor Minh Mạng, a number of innovative machines were constructed, including sawmills powered by water power and water buffaloes, as well as wood-cutting machines powered by buffaloes. In particular, in 1834, with Minh Mạng's approval, Trương Viết Súy constructed a water-powered gunpowder mill known as Thủy hỏa ký tế.

In 1837 and 1838, following Western designs, state craftsmen succeeded in constructing water-powered machines for sawing and cutting timber, water pumps for irrigating fields, and even a fire engine.

Most notably, in 1839, based on Western designs, the master craftsmen Hoàng Văn Lịch and Vũ Huy Trịnh, together with their artisans, successfully constructed the first steamship in Vietnam. Emperor Minh Mạng praised their achievement highly. The following year (1840), Minh Mạng ordered them to construct a new and more advanced vessel and to repair another that had been damaged. Unfortunately, the program appears to have been discontinued thereafter.

In more recent history, Vietnamese (both domestic scientists and Overseas Vietnamese) inventors and scientists have produced several great discoveries. Đàm Thanh Sơn, a theoretical physicist, Eugene H. Trinh, and Bui Tuong Phong, the creator of the Phong reflection model, are three examples of Vietnamese Americans having done great scientific work. Hung Nguyen Xuan, Đái Duy Ban, Hoàng Tụy (known for the Tụy cut in global optimization) are three examples of notable scientists in Vietnam. Ngô Bảo Châu, a citizen of Vietnam and France, was awarded a Fields Medal for his work in the mathematical theory of automorphic forms. Đỗ Đức Cường is also credited as the co-inventor of the ATM along with John Shepherd-Barron & Donald Wetzel. AXIE Infinity was a 2018 NFT-based video game by Sky Mavis (co-created by Nguyễn Thành Trung), which had started to become immensely popular by 2021.

== Socio-economic context ==
=== Structure of the economy ===
Vietnam has become increasingly integrated into the world economy, particularly since its efforts to liberalize the economy enabled it to join the World Trade Organization in 2007. The manufacturing and service sectors each account for 40% of GDP. However, almost half the labor force (48%) is still employed in agriculture. One million workers a year, out of a total of 51.3 million in 2010, are projected to continue leaving agriculture for the other economic sectors in the foreseeable future.

In manufacturing, Vietnam is expected to lose some of its current comparative advantage in low wages in the near future. It will need to compensate for this loss with productivity gains, if it is to sustain high growth rates: GDP per capita has almost doubled since 2008. High-tech exports from Vietnam grew dramatically during 2008–2013, particularly with respect to office computers and electronic communications equipment. A big challenge will be to implement strategies that increase the potential for enhancing technology and skills currently present in large multinational firms to smaller-scale domestic firms. This will require strategies to enhance technical capacity and skills among local firms that are, as yet, only weakly integrated with global production chains.

Many foreign multinational firms have gravitated towards Vietnam in recent years but the number of patents nevertheless remains low: 47 were granted between 2002 and 2013. Even though 11% of Southeast Asia's high-tech exports came from Vietnam in 2013 (excluding the Republic of Korea and Japan), according to the Comtrade database, the majority of high-tech exports from Vietnam were designed elsewhere and assembled in Vietnam. Even if foreign firms change their behavior and intensify their in-house R&D, this will only boost R&D in Vietnam if the multinationals can train a sufficient number of local personnel and work with skilled local suppliers and firms.

=== Higher education ===
Since 1995, enrolment in higher education has grown tenfold to well over 2 million in 2012. By 2014, there were 419 institutions of higher education. A number of foreign universities operate private campuses in Vietnam, including Harvard University (USA) and the Royal Melbourne Institute of Technology (Australia).

The government’s strong commitment to education (6.3% of GDP in 2012), in general, and higher education, in particular (1.05% of GDP in 2012), has fostered significant growth in higher education but this growth will need to be sustained to retain academics. The Law on Higher Education (2012) gives university administrators greater autonomy, although the Ministry of Education retains responsibility for quality assurance.

== Science, technology and innovation ==
=== Institutional context ===
There are a large number of universities and an even larger pool of research institutions in Vietnam. This poses a challenge for ministries in terms of co-ordination. To some extent, market forces are likely to eliminate the smaller and financially weaker units.

The autonomy which Vietnamese research centres have enjoyed since the mid-1990s has enabled many of them to operate as quasi-private organizations, providing services such as consulting and technology development. Some have ‘spun off’ from the larger institutions to form their own semi-private enterprises, fostering the transfer of public sector personnel employed in science and technology to these semi-private establishments. One comparatively new university, Ton Duc Thang (est. 1997), has already set up 13 centres for technology transfer and services that together produce 15% of university revenue. Many of these research centres serve as valuable intermediaries bridging public research institutions, universities and firms. 60% of the population in Vietnam is below 30 years old and more than 25000 eligible engineers graduate from college every year.

=== Policy developments ===
The Law on Higher Education (2012) offers university administrators greater autonomy and there are reports that growing numbers of academic staff are also serving as advisors to NGOs and private firms. The Strategy for Science and Technology Development for 2011–2020 drawn up by the Ministry of Science and Technology in 2012, builds upon this law by promoting public–private partnerships and seeking to transform ‘public S&T organisations into self-managed and accountable mechanisms as stipulated by law’. The main emphasis is on overall planning and priority-setting, with a view to enhancing innovation capability, particularly in industrial sectors. Although the Strategy omits to fix any targets for funding, it nevertheless sets broad policy directions and priority areas for investment, including:

- research in mathematics and physics;
- investigation of climate change and natural disasters;
- development of operating systems for computers, tablets and mobile devices;
- biotechnology applied particularly to agriculture, forestry, fisheries and medicine; and
- environmental protection.

The Strategy foresees the development of a network of organizations to support consultancy services in the field of innovation and the development of intellectual property. The Strategy also seeks to promote greater international scientific co-operation, with a plan to establish a network of Vietnamese scientists overseas and to initiate a network of ‘outstanding research centres’ linking key national science institutions with partners abroad.

Vietnam has also developed a set of national development strategies for selected sectors of the economy, many of which involve science and technology. Examples are the Sustainable Development Strategy (April 2012) and the Mechanical Engineering Industry Development Strategy (2006), together with Vision 2020 (2006). These dual strategies call for a highly skilled human resource base, a strong policy for investment in research and development, fiscal policies to encourage technological upgrading in the private sector and private-sector investment and regulations to steer investment towards sustainable development.

=== Research trends ===
In 2011, domestic research expenditure amounted to 0.19% of GDP, one of the lowest ratios in Southeast Asia. Women accounted for 41% of the country's researchers in 2012, one of the highest ratios in Southeast Asia. Vietnam was ranked 44th in the Global Innovation Index in 2025, it has increased its ranking considerably since 2012, where it was ranked 76th. The number of Vietnamese publications in Thomson Reuters' Web of Science has increased at a rate well above the average for Southeast Asia but from a low starting point: Vietnamese scientists had 570 articles catalogued in international journals in 2005 and 2 298 in 2014. By 2014, Vietnam had a modest scientific publication density of 25 publications per million inhabitants. This places Vietnam behind Thailand (94), Vanuatu (74) and the Solomon Islands (30) but ahead of the Lao Peoples' Democratic Republic (19). Vietnamese publications catalogued in international journals focus mainly on life sciences (22%), physics (13%) and engineering (13%), which is consistent with recent advances in the production of diagnostic equipment and shipbuilding. Almost 77% of all papers published between 2008 and 2014 by Vietnamese scientists had at least one international scientist in collaboration.

=== Performance of Vietnamese students in International Science Olympiads ===
Vietnam's rank based on number of Gold Medals in last 10 years(2014-2023):

- Physics - 6-th
- Chemistry -4-th
- Biology - 13-th
- Mathematics - 5-th

== See also ==
- Ministry of Science and Technology (Vietnam)
- Ministry of Health (Vietnam)
- Vietnam Union of Science and Technology Associations
- Vietnam Academy of Science and Technology
- Ho Chi Minh City University of Science
- Hanoi University of Science and Technology
- List of Vietnamese inventions and discoveries

== Sources ==
This article incorporates text from a free content work. Licensed under CC-BY-SA IGO 3.0. Text taken from UNESCO Science Report: towards 2030, 693-731, UNESCO, UNESCO Publishing.
