= Uchigatana =

Type of Japanese sword

Uchigatana (打刀)
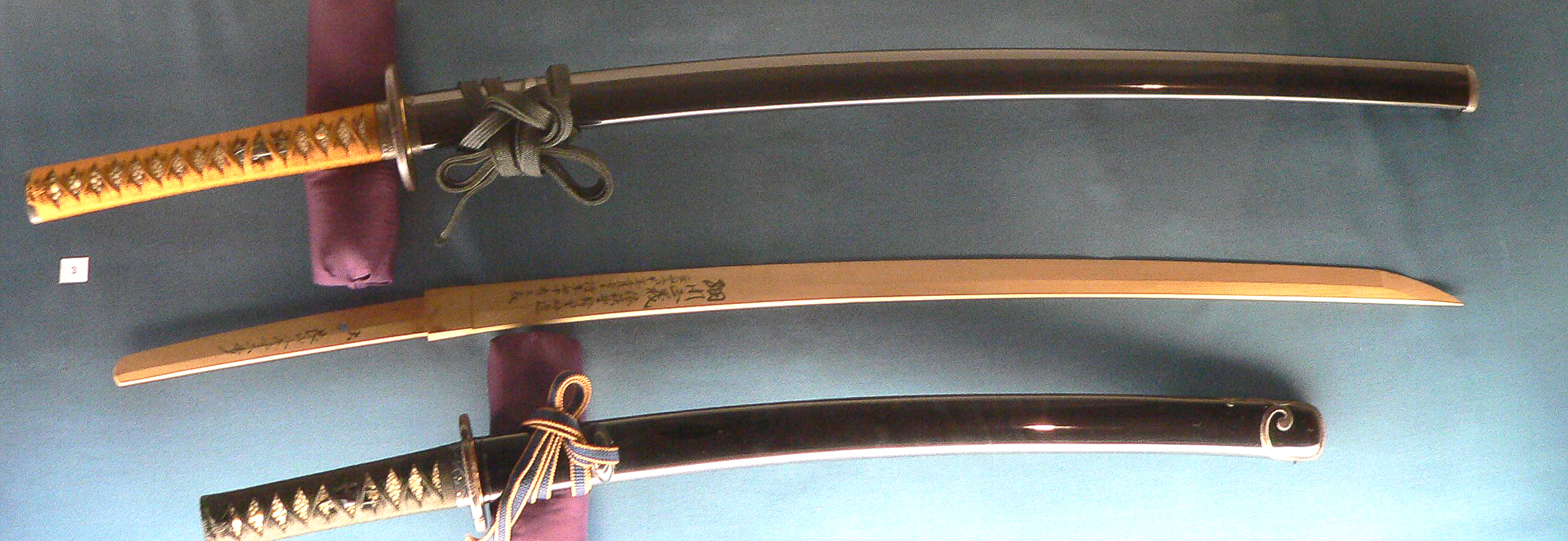
- Uchigatana full exterior (upper section)
- Type: Sword
- Place of origin: Japan

Production history
- Produced: Kamakura Period (1185–1333) to present

Specifications
- Blade length: 60+ cm

An uchigatana (打刀) is a type of Japanese sword worn by the samurai class of feudal Japan. The uchigatana was the descendant of the tachi. The official term for katana in Japan is uchigatana and the term katana often refers to single-edged swords from around the world.

== History ==
The production of swords in Japan is divided into specific time periods:

- Jokoto (ancient swords, until around 900 )
- Koto (old swords from around 900–1596 )
- Shinto (new swords 1596–1780 )
- Shinshinto (new new swords 1781–1876 )
- Gendaito (modern swords 1876–1945 )
- Shinsakuto (newly made swords 1953–present)

From the Heian to the Muromachi Period, the primary battlefield sword was the tachi. Its long blade and sharp edge made it ideal for use on horseback. During the fifteenth century, the uchigatana came into use, and during the Muromachi Period (1336 to 1573) use of the uchigatana became widespread.

The word uchigatana can be found in literary works as early as the Kamakura Period, with uchi meaning "striking" and gatana (katana) meaning "sword", so that uchigatana means "striking sword". The uchigatana was originally used only by individuals of low status or rank, such as the ashigaru.

Most uchigatana made during the early Kamakura Period were not of the highest standard, and thus, were considered disposable, virtually no examples from these early times exist today. It was not until the Muromachi Period, when samurai began to use uchigatana to supplement the longer tachi, that uchigatana of higher quality were made. During the Momoyama period, the tachi was almost totally abandoned and the custom of wearing a pair of long and short uchigatana together (called the daishō) became the dominant symbol of the samurai class.

== Description ==
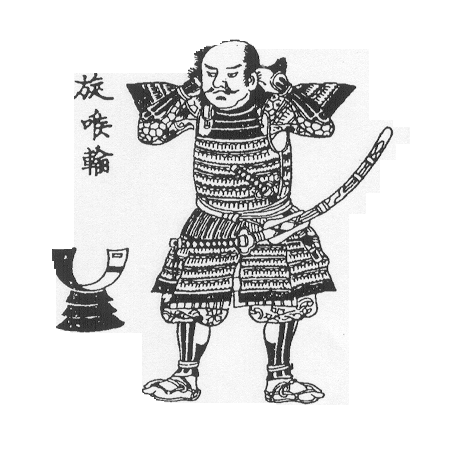
A Japanese Edo period wood block print of a samurai wearing a tachi, the cutting edge of the tachi is worn pointing down as opposed to the uchigatana or katana which would be worn cutting edge up.

The blade length of the uchigatana during the 16th century is said to have been from 60 cm to no more than 70 cm, with a stout sugata, a steep saki-zori, and it could be used as a one handed sword due to its thin kasane (thickness) and short tang (nakago) making it relatively light.

As opposed to the tachi, the uchigatana was worn edge-up in the belt, this and usually being slightly smaller than the tachi was the main difference between the tachi and the uchigatana. Since the uchigatana is worn differently than the tachi, the signature (mei) carved into the tang of the uchigatana is also opposite to the tachi mei, making the words still upright instead of upside down as when one wears the tachi in the manner of the uchigatana.

Uchigatana had become popular for several reasons. Firstly, the uchigatana had proven more convenient to wear, and did not get in the way of using a polearm as much as a tachi. The uchigatana's rapid acceptance had also owed to the frequency of battles fought on foot as well as to a developing emphasis on soldiers' speed, indicating that battlefield combat had sharply intensified. Since the uchigatana was shorter than the tachi, it could be used in more confined quarters, such as inside a building. Furthermore, tactics of the period had dictated unseating mounted soldiers by cutting off the mounts legs; hence, mounted combat had become seen as inherently disadvantageous.

== Use ==
Unlike the tachi, with which the acts of drawing and striking with the sword were two separate actions, unsheathing the uchigatana and cutting the enemy down with it became one smooth, lightning-fast action. This technique was developed in the arts of battojutsu, iaijutsu, and iaido.

The curvature of the uchigatana blade differs from the tachi in that the blade has curvature near the sword's point (sakizori), as opposed to curvature near the sword's hilt (koshizori) like the tachi. Because the sword is being drawn from below, the act of unsheathing became the act of striking. For a soldier on horseback, the sakizori curve of the uchigatana was essential in such a blade, since it allows the sword to come out of its sheath (saya) at the most convenient angle for executing an immediate cut.

== See also ==
- Japanese sword
- Tachi
- Ōdachi
- Wakizashi
- Tantō
- Daishō
- Katana
- Japanese sword mountings
