= Korean armour =

Type of armour

Korean armour refers to various types of armour traditionally used in Korea before the modern era. The earliest examples of armour from the Korean peninsula date back to the Korean Three Kingdoms period. Korean armour also included horse armour and other kinds of early anti-ballistic armour before the 20th century.

== Introduction ==
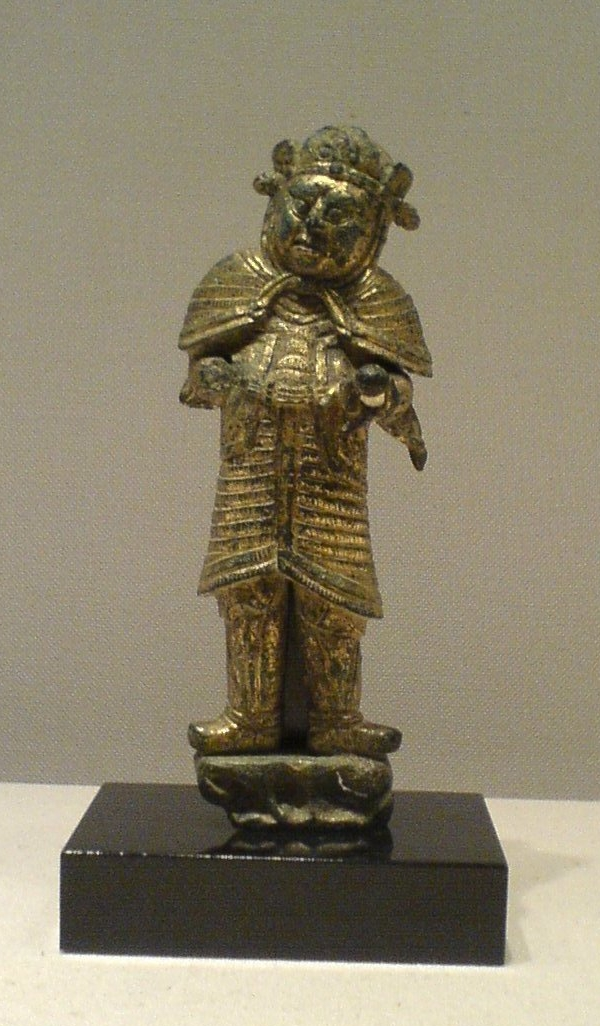
A cheonwang (Heavenly King) in lamellar armour, Silla, 8th c.

The earliest armour types appeared during the Bronze Age and were likely made of animal skins, bone or wood. The earliest findings of iron armour were from the Gaya confederacy and Goguryeo, while bone armour could be found in Baekje.

Metal armour was relatively widespread during the Three Kingdoms period due to constant warfare, but its usage declined once Korea was unified and Japanese pirates or steppe nomads became the main concerns. Following the collapse of Unified Silla in the tenth century and its conquest by Goryeo, warfare shifted toward the northern and central part of Korea and lighter armours became more common. This resulted in the decline of heavy armour typically used by the southern states.

The first known use of iron plate mail in Korea was used by the Gaya confederacy between 42 and 562 AD. A large number of iron and steel artifacts, including iron armour, iron horse armour such as helmets and bits, and smaller iron ingots (often used as money), have been found in the Daeseong-dong Ancient Tombs, a World Heritage Site, in Gimhae. Gimhae (Korean: 金海 김해) means "Sea of Iron" as if the city's name symbolizes the abundance of iron in the area. Surviving examples are currently on display at the Gimhae National Museum in South Korea.

Battles were most often fought on difficult terrain, with ranged combat using composite bows and later gunpowder weapons. Cavalry was favored against the constant Jurchen raids during the Joseon period. Fighting against the larger forces of China and Japan, Koreans favored mobility and ranged tactics which limited the reliance upon vastly armoured units despite a strong inclusion of melee training.

During later periods, Korean armour also included forms of brigandine, chain mail, and scale armour. Due to the cost of iron and steel equipment that were often too high for peasant conscripts, helmets were not always full steel and stiffened leather caps were not uncommon.

Korean armour pieces, from top to bottom, typically consisted of a helmet or a cap, a heavy main armour coat with pauldrons or shoulder and forearm protection, leg coverings (supplemented by the skirting from the main coat), groin protection, and limb protection. In terms of armament, Korean militaries employed heavy infantry equipped with swords or spears along with shields, pikemen, archers, crossbowmen, and versatile heavy cavalry capable of horse archery. Korean naval warfare saw large deployments of heavy wooden shields as a means of protecting personnel on the top decks of Korean ships.

After the rise of the Joseon, Korean combat armour saw a change from mainly using chain mail, plated mail, and lamellar armor to mostly brigandine. By the time of the mid-Joseon, provincial troops were equipped with padded armour while the central units could afford metal-made armour.

== Three Kingdoms period ==
Korean armour during the Korean Three Kingdoms period consisted of two major styles: the 'Chalgap' lamellar armour similar to the ones used by the equestrian steppe nomads and Sinitic empires to the west and plate armour, found in the Gaya Confederation and Silla. The lamellar often consisted of bronze, iron, bone, or stiffened leather; plates were always of iron, steel, or bronze. The best-preserved armours from the three kingdoms period originate almost exclusively from the Gaya confederacy. The armour from Gaya is the best example of plate armour from ancient times, rivaling those of the Mediterranean basin from the same period. These Gaya-style plate armours are categorized into three types- one is made by joining vertical steel bands to form a single plate, another by joining horizontal bars, and the other by putting small triangular steel pieces together. The first type is found in Gaya and Silla, while most examples for the other two are located in Gaya, and some have been found in northern Baekje. Similar styles have also been found in Kyushu and Honshu, Japan.

Lamellar armour was the most common type armor during the Goguryeo dynasty, made of small steel plates woven together with cord. Ancient tombs of the Jjoksaem District of Hwango-dong, Gyeongju, North Gyeongsang, uncovered the first example in 2009. Goguryeo murals found in North Korea also shed light on what Goguryeo's armour looked like.

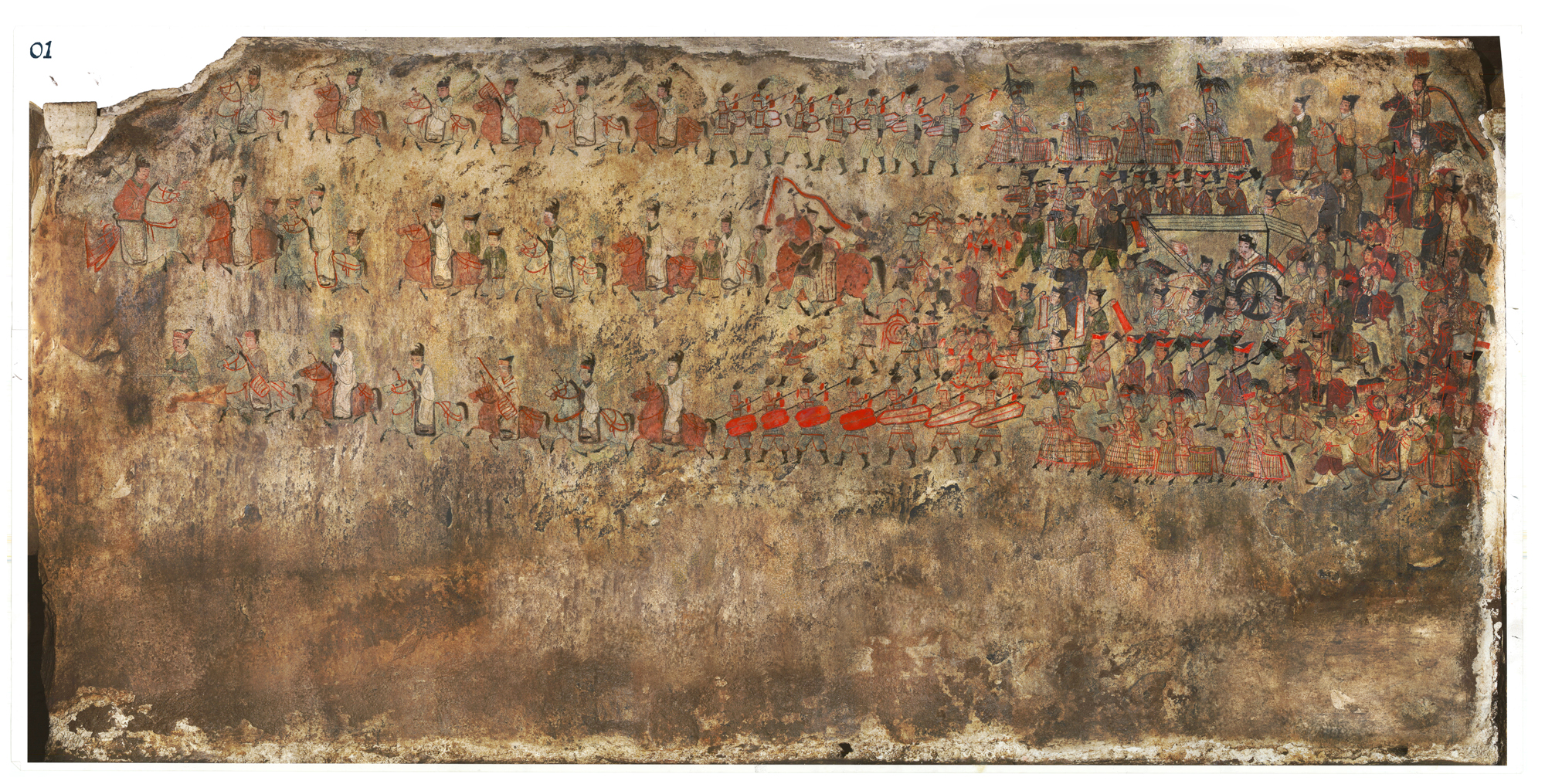
Procession Murals of the Goguryeo Military (Anak Tomb No.3, North Korea)

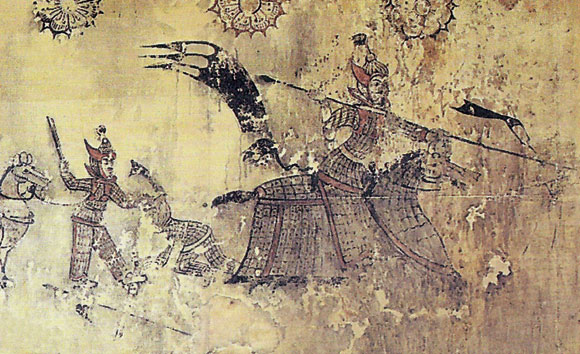
Goguryeo Cataphract (개마무사)

Goguryeo and Paekche soldier replicas

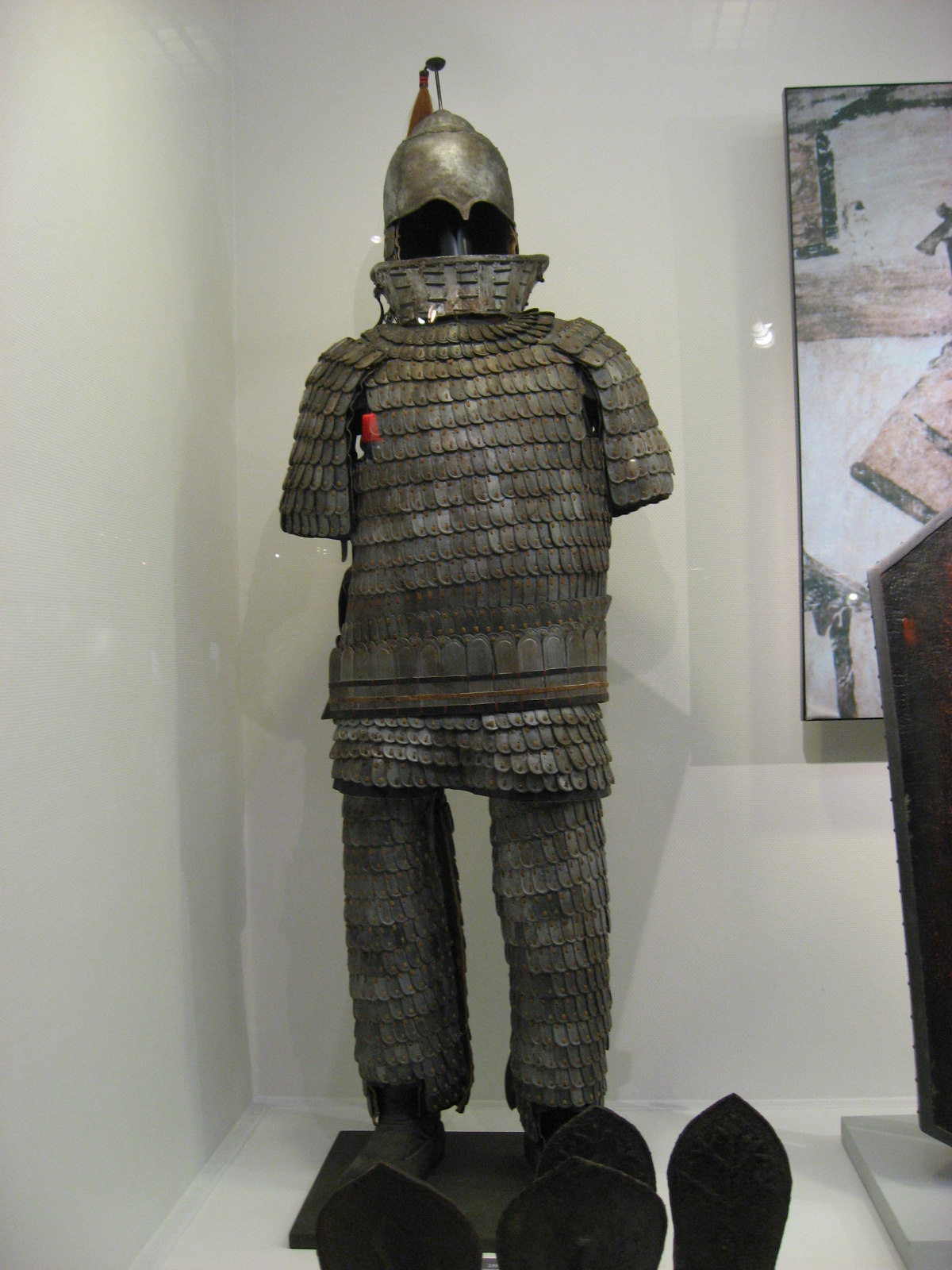
Korean armour from Goguryeo, worn by Cataphract

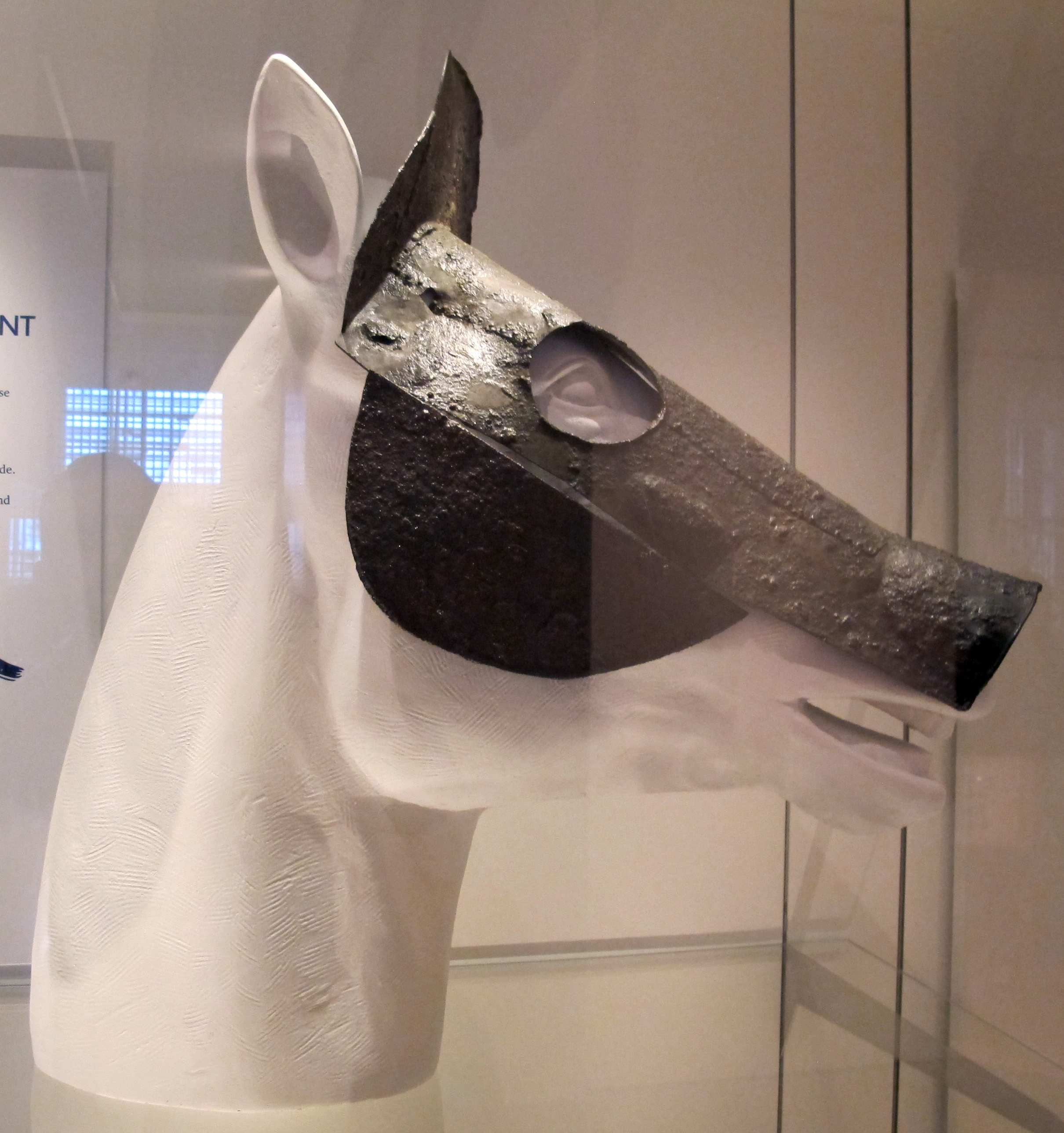
Gaya horse armour

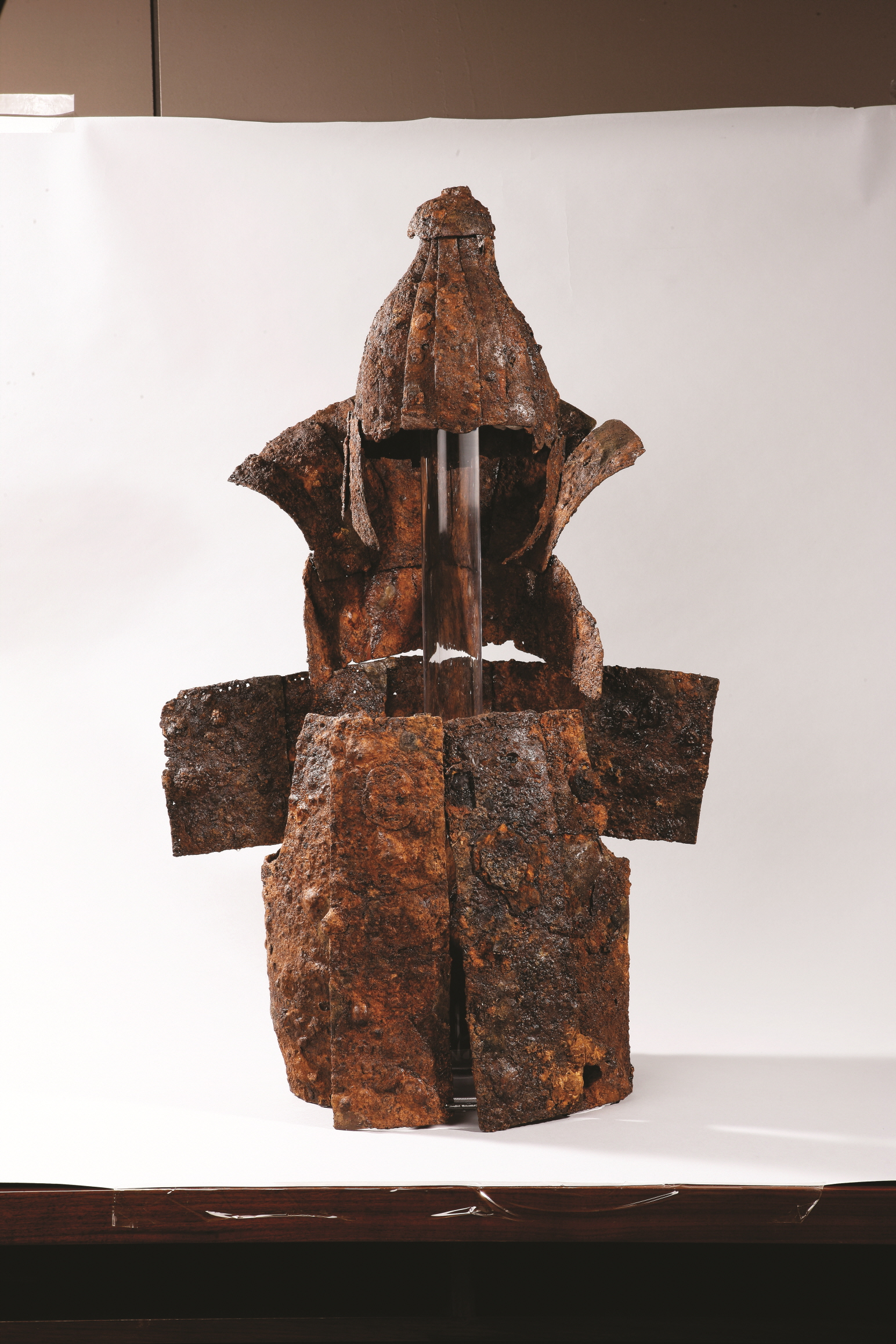
Shilla plate armour

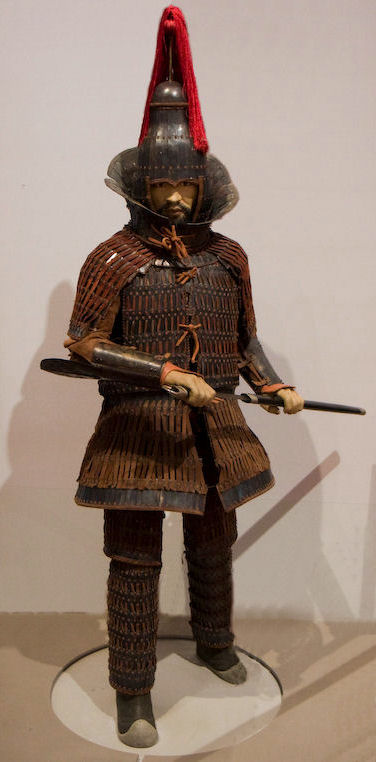
Gaya armour

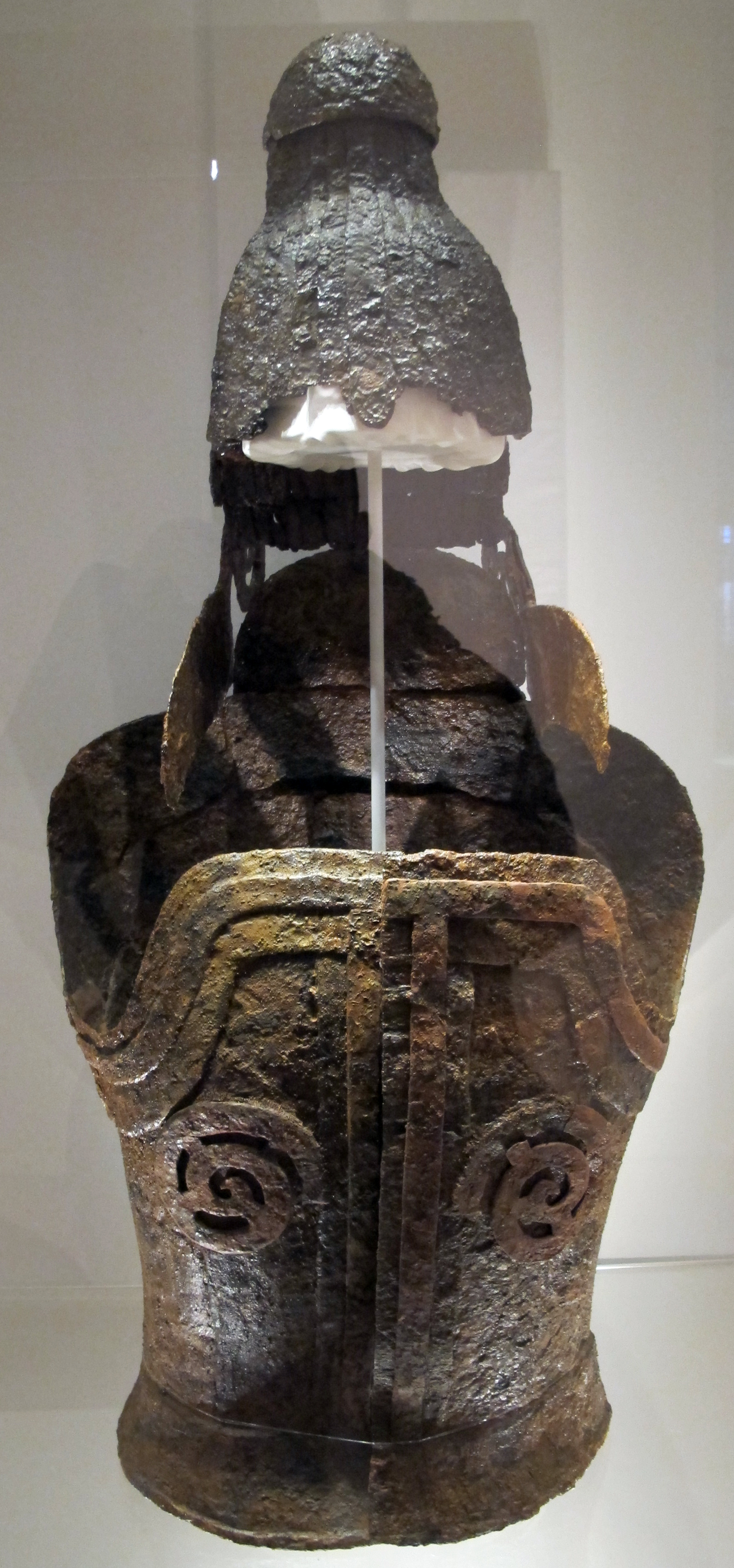
Gaya armour

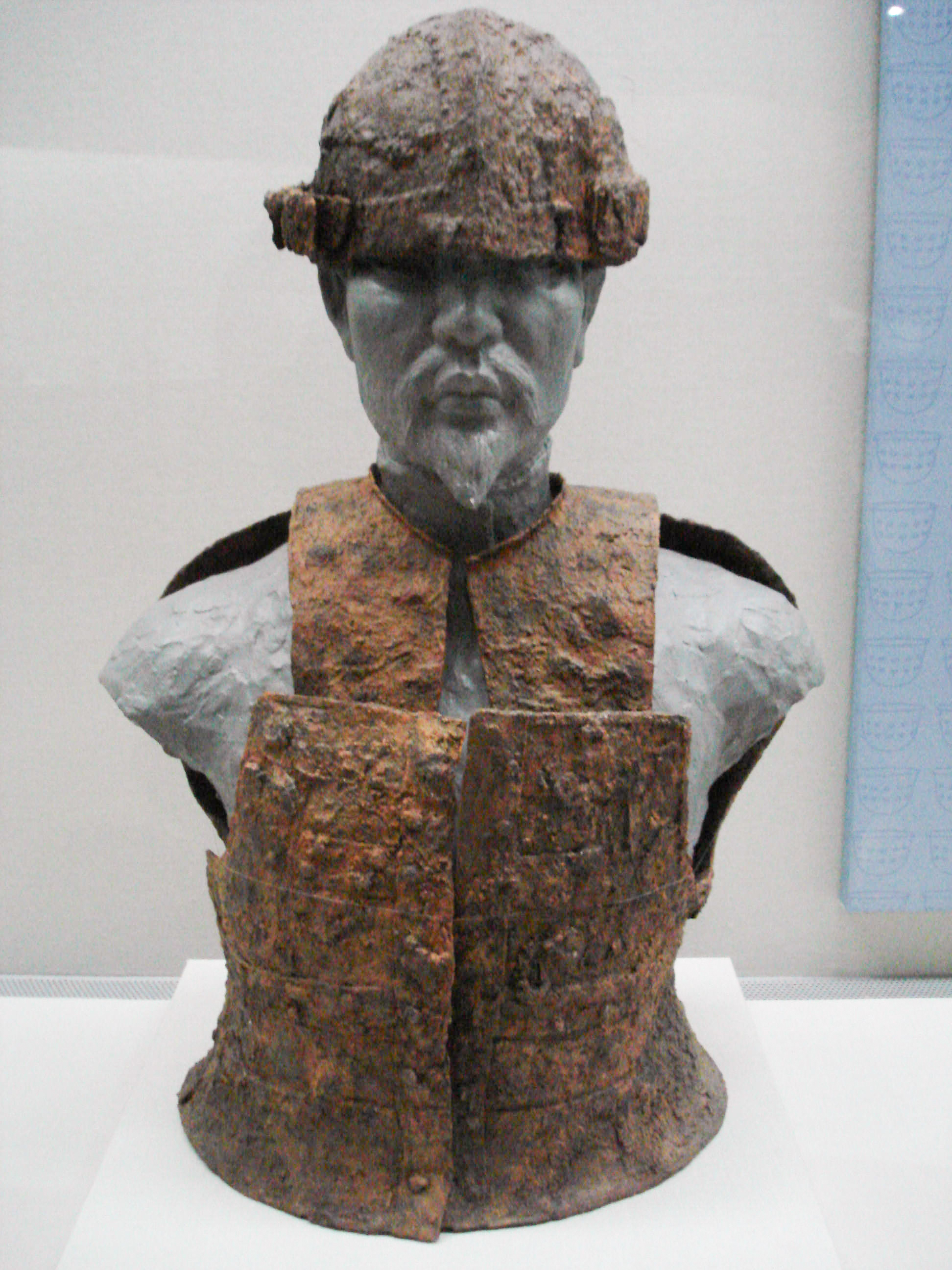
Gaya armour and helmet (5th century)

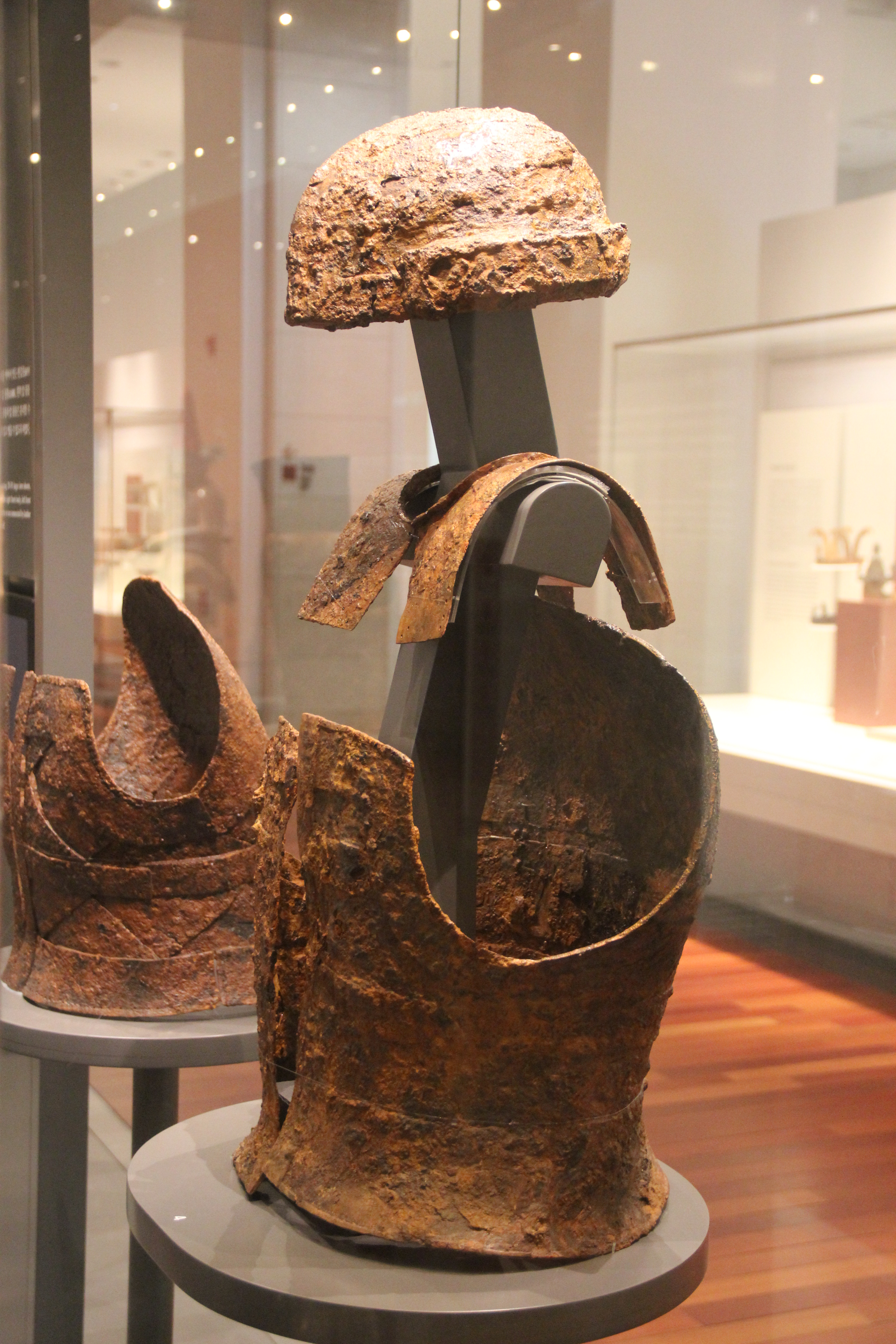
Gaya confederacy armour

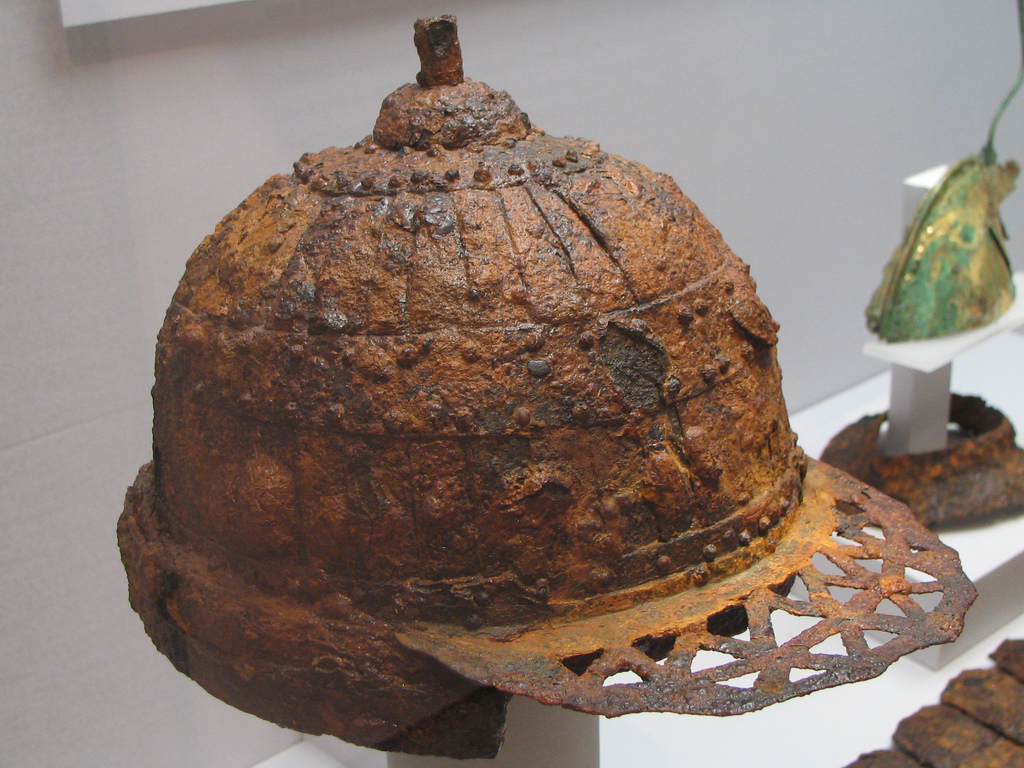
Gaya helmet

== Goryeo dynasty armour ==
During the Goryeo dynasty, a distinctive style of armor known as the durumagi-type armor (두루마기형 갑옷), or robe-shaped (po-hyeong, 포형, 袍型) armor appeared. According to the Goryeosa (History of Goryeo), various types of armor differing in material and color were produced under state supervision, including uigap (의갑, 衣甲) – clothing armor, cheolgab (철갑, 鐵甲) – iron armor, uibaekgap (의백갑, 衣白甲) – white clothing armor, baekgab tomo (백갑토모, 白甲兎牟) – white armor with helmet, uijugap (의주갑, 衣朱甲) – red clothing armor, and jagap (자갑, 紫甲) – purple armor. When military officials wore armor, they carried their helmets over their backs rather than on their heads. In addition, soldiers wore an army robe called jeonpo (전포, 戰袍).

The exact form and structure of the armor are not clearly known. However, Xu Jing’s Illustrated Account of Goryeo (Goryeodogyeong) records that Goryeo’s elite Dragon-Tiger Central Fierce Army (Yongho Jungmaenggun, 용호중맹군, 龍虎中猛軍), numbering about 30,000 men, all wore armor. This armor was a robe-shaped suit with the upper and lower parts connected, without shoulder guards (bubak, 부박, 覆膊). Another general’s armor was described as iron lamellae (cheolchal, 철찰, 鐵札) covered with black leather, each plate stitched together with patterned silk so they were held in place. Furthermore, Japanese illustrations such as the Mōko Shūrai Ekotoba (몽고습래회사, 蒙古襲來繪詞, “Illustrated Account of the Mongol Invasions”) show that during the Goryeo-Mongol allied invasions of Japan, Goryeo soldiers wore long vest-like lamellar armor (찰갑, 札甲) and robe-shaped textile armor (포형 갑옷).

General Chonji wore the gyeongbeongap (경번갑/鏡幡甲).

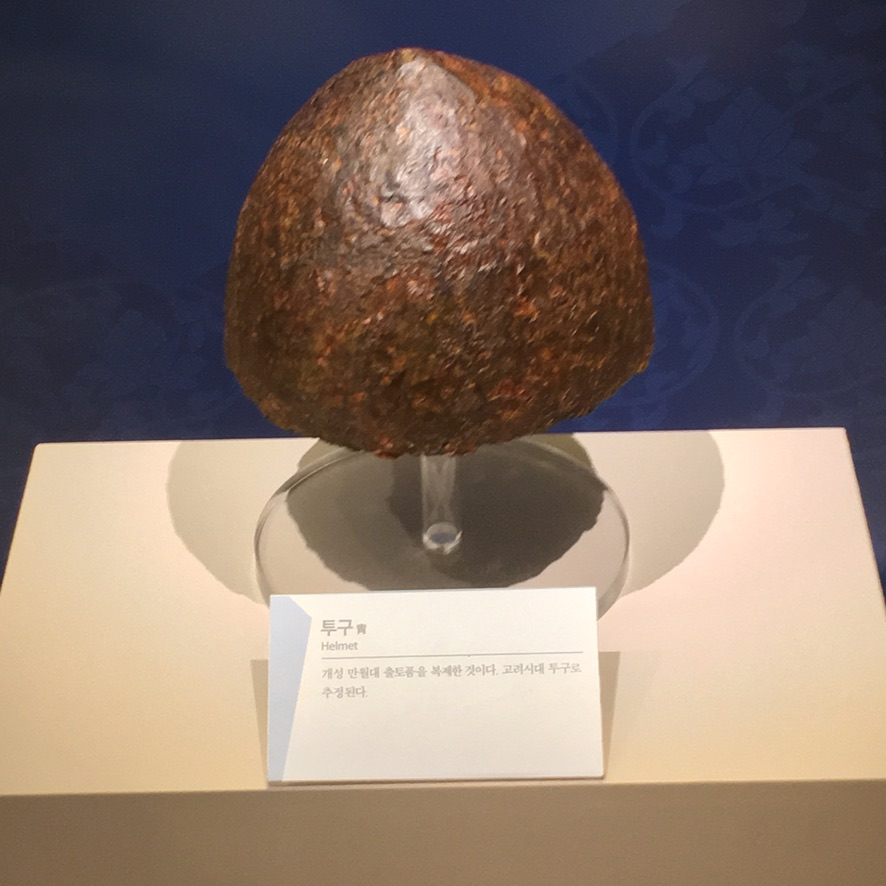
Helmet presumably from the Goryeo dynasty.

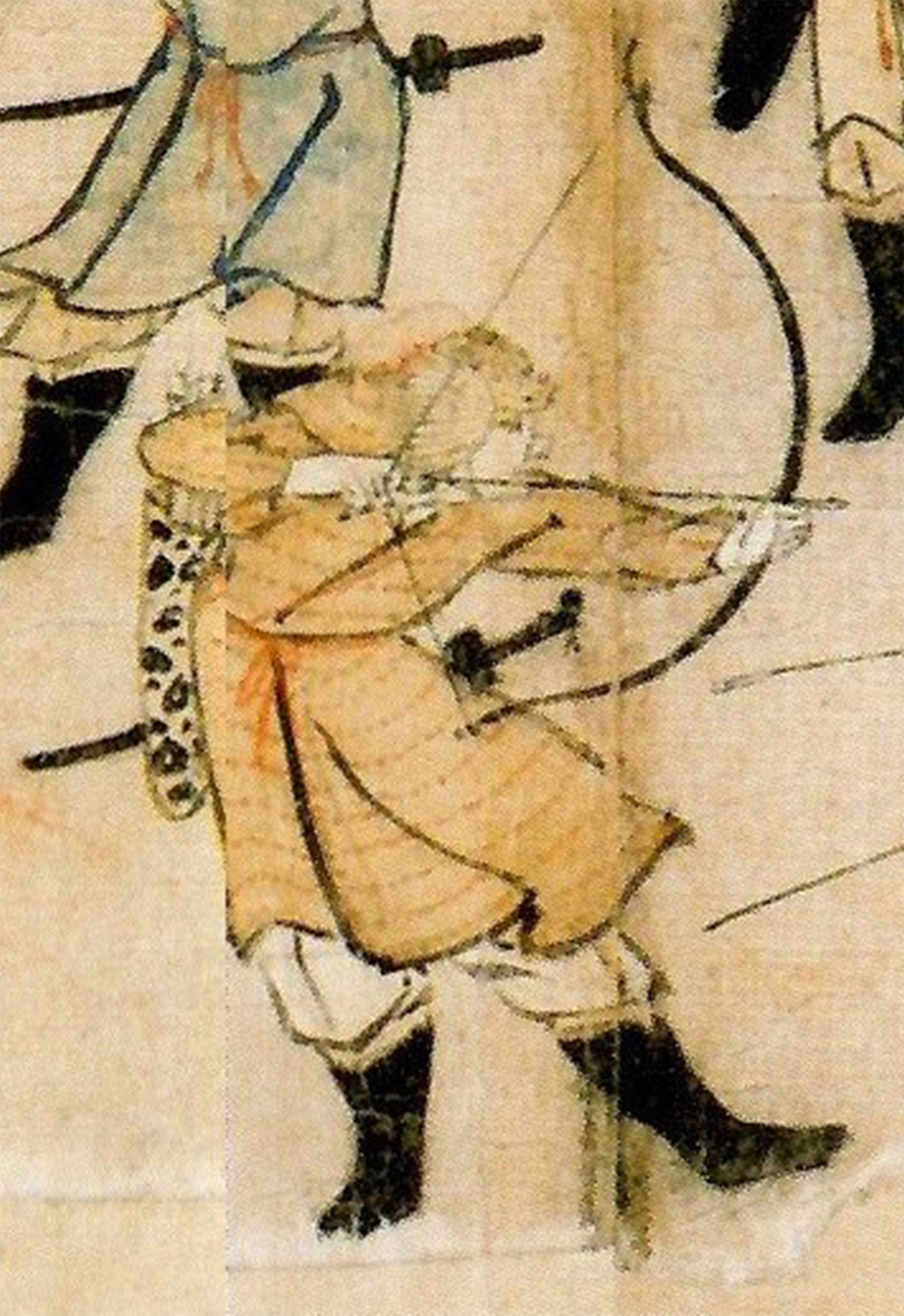
A Goryeo Soldier wearing a durumagi.

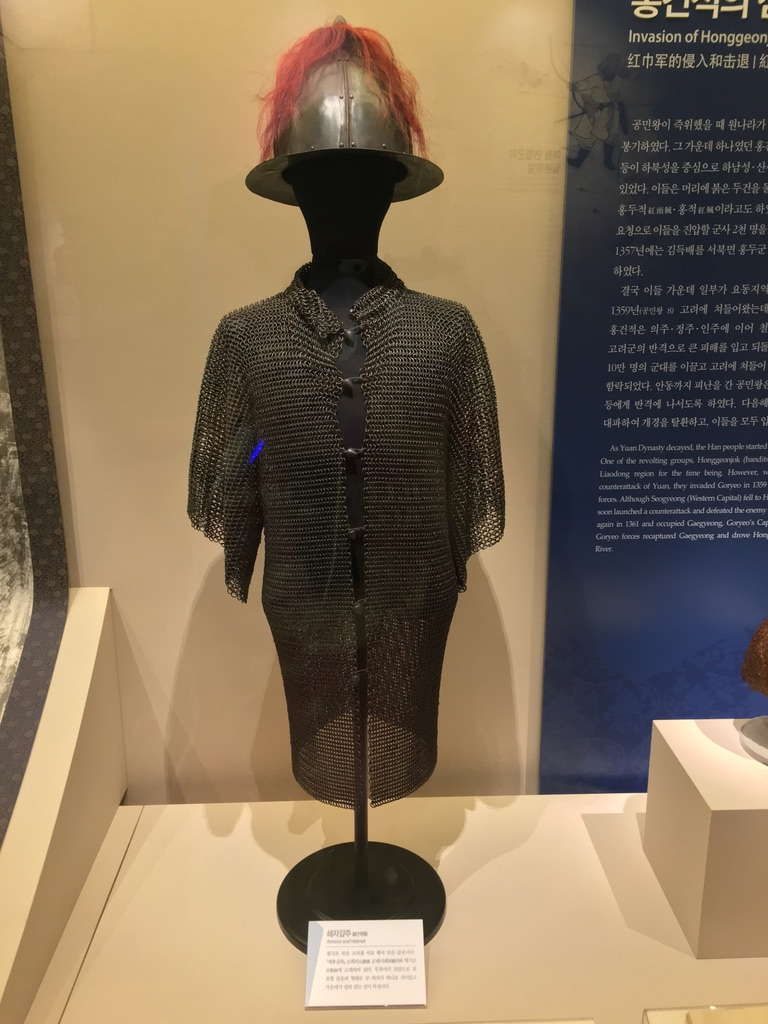
Chain Mail and helmet.

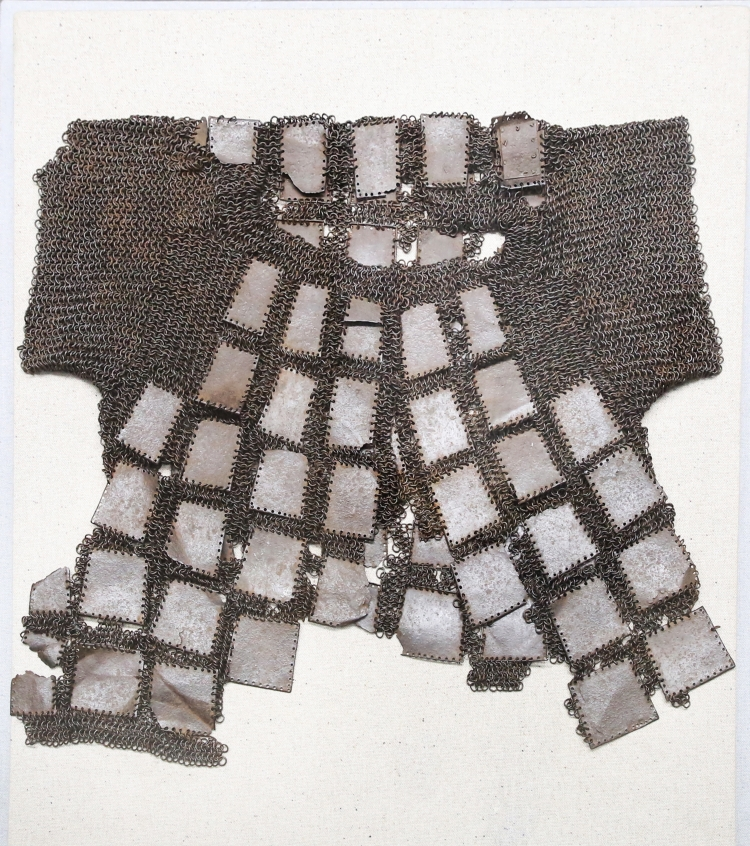
Mail and plate armour(경번갑), Goryeo, 14th c.

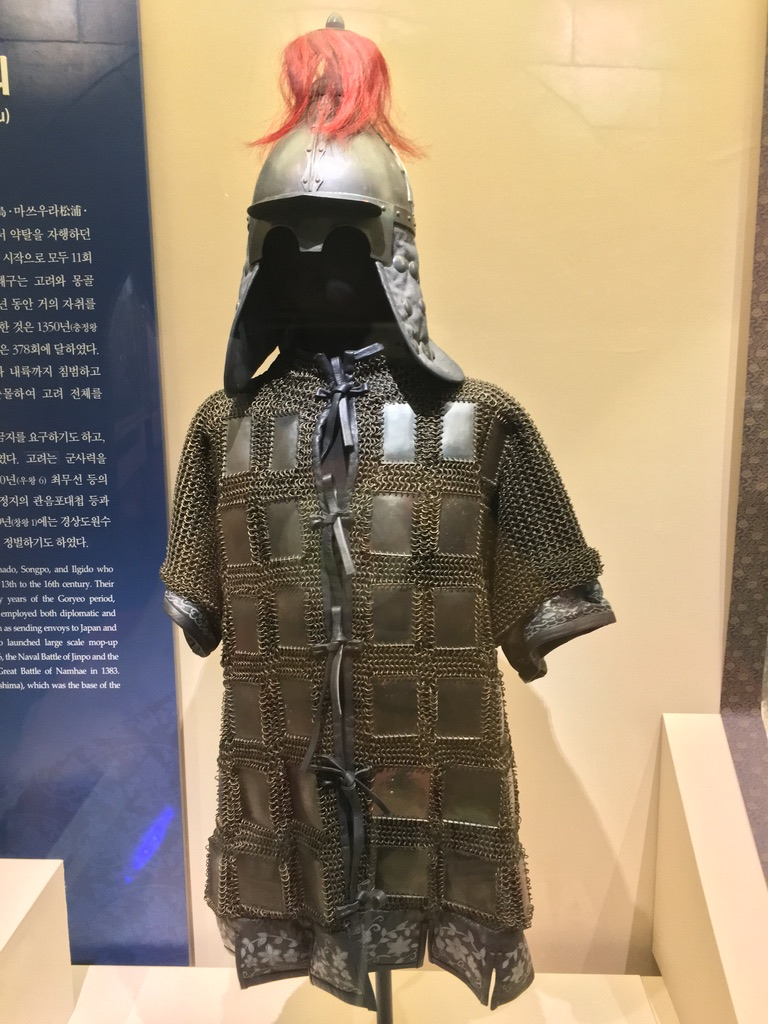
Mail and plate armour and helmet.

== Joseon dynasty armor ==
Armor from the Joseon dynasty can be classified into roughly two time periods, the early dynasty (c.15~16th centuries) and the late dynasty (c. 17th~19th centuries). The exact transition point from the early to late dynasty armor remains unresolved. Still, it appears to be around the Japanese invasions of Korea (1592–1598) and the Manchu invasion of Korea, the two and only total wars that Korea faced during the Joseon dynasty. Throughout both periods, however, padded armor (eomshimgap, Korean: 엄심갑; Hanja: 掩心甲) was popular among the common soldiers, as Joseon required peasant conscripts to provide their equipment and the armor offered body protection at a low price. Sets of leather armor are called Pigabju. Iron armor was largely seen within units stationed in the capital, which formed the main striking power of the Joseon land forces.

Most Korean armor of this period utilized scales or lamellae composed of metal (usually iron) plates attached to the exterior of the armor coat. Starting as early as 1457, due to issues of cost and transport, an initiative was begun to replace the metal components of a majority of armor issued to personnel with hardened leather. While warmer, lighter, and more flexible than iron scales/lamellae, armor utilizing hardened leather scales provided less effective protection in combat.

In the early dynasty, the Joseon Army and Navy wore chain mail and plate armor from the late Goryeo dynasty. In contrast, lamellar armor, the traditional form of Korean armor, also persisted with some influences from the Mongols received during the 13~14th centuries. A complete metallic armor set was composed of a helmet similar to kettle hats with attached neck defenses of mail or lamellar, a body armor reaching down to the thighs or knees, and a set of shoulder guards which protected the upper arm as well.

By the time of the Japanese invasions of Korea from 1592 to 1598, some Korean military armor components had been switched over from iron to hardened leather, but extant examples and contemporary documentation indicate that those Korean personnel wearing armor still utilized iron scales and such armor proved to be effective against most Japanese weaponry (not so much against firearms) in combat.

Over time, Korean scaled armor changed in style. Initially the scales were on the exterior of the armor and thus attached to a base leather and fabric backing, but by the later Joseon era the scales (by this time mostly hardened leather) were riveted inside the armor coat, forming a type of brigandine armor. Called dujeong-gap, this became the primary form of Korean armor and often reached below the knees when worn, and the helmet assumed a conical shape. Officers, senior/elite soldiers, and cavalry still had metal plates/scales in their armor (for mounted forces this was called gabsa while for non-mounted forces this was called pengbaesu), while peasant/low-ranking soldiers wore armor with hardened leather plates/scales.

In the mid-19th century there was an attempt to develop anti-ballistic armor called Myeonje baegab. It was made by sewing sheets of textiles and cotton and combining them into a thick vest to respond to the overwhelming firepower of rifles fielded by Western powers such as France and the United States. Although this attempt was partially in line with the current method of producing anti-ballistic vests, it does not appear to have proved effective.

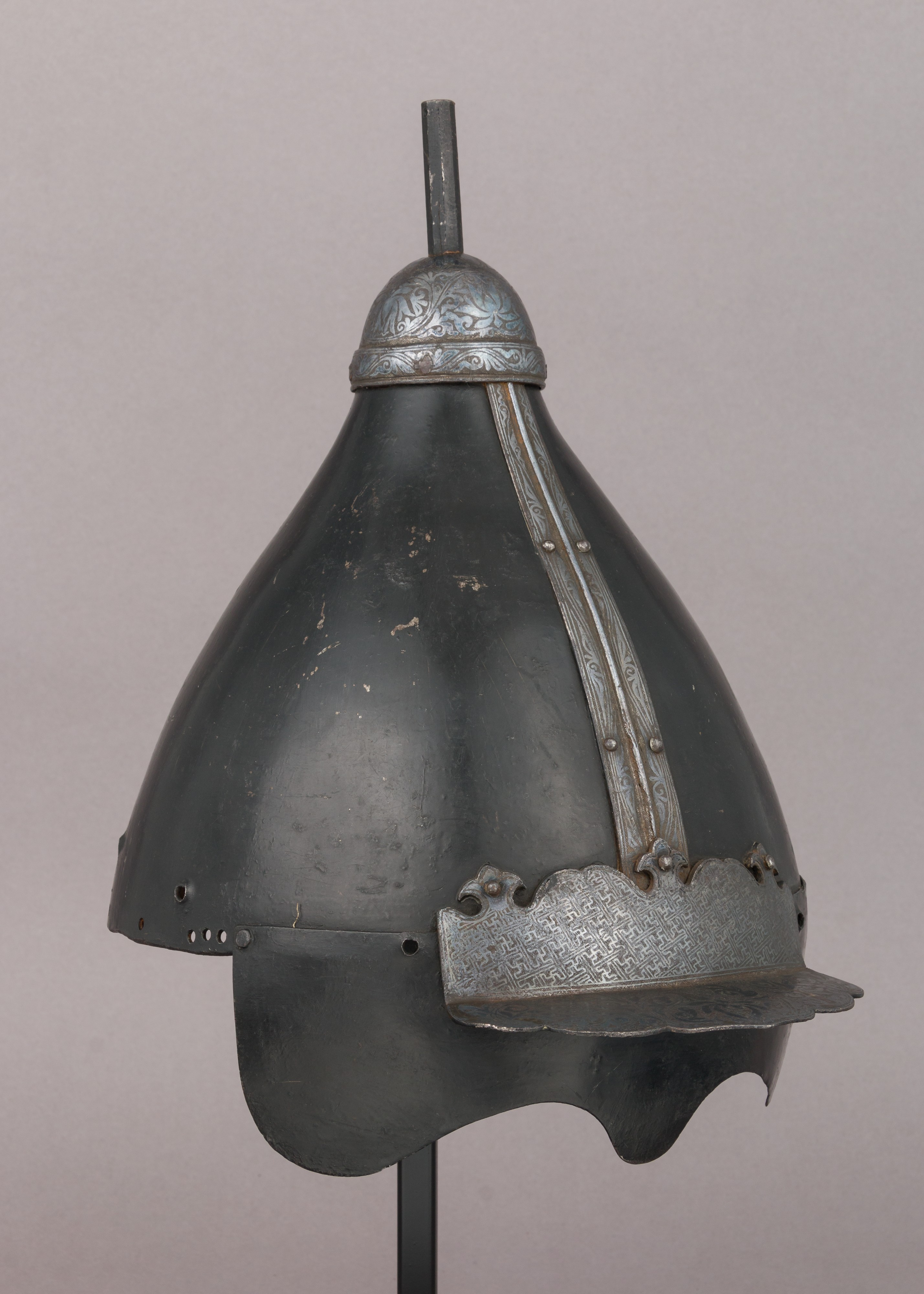
Helmet, Joseon, 17th-18th c.

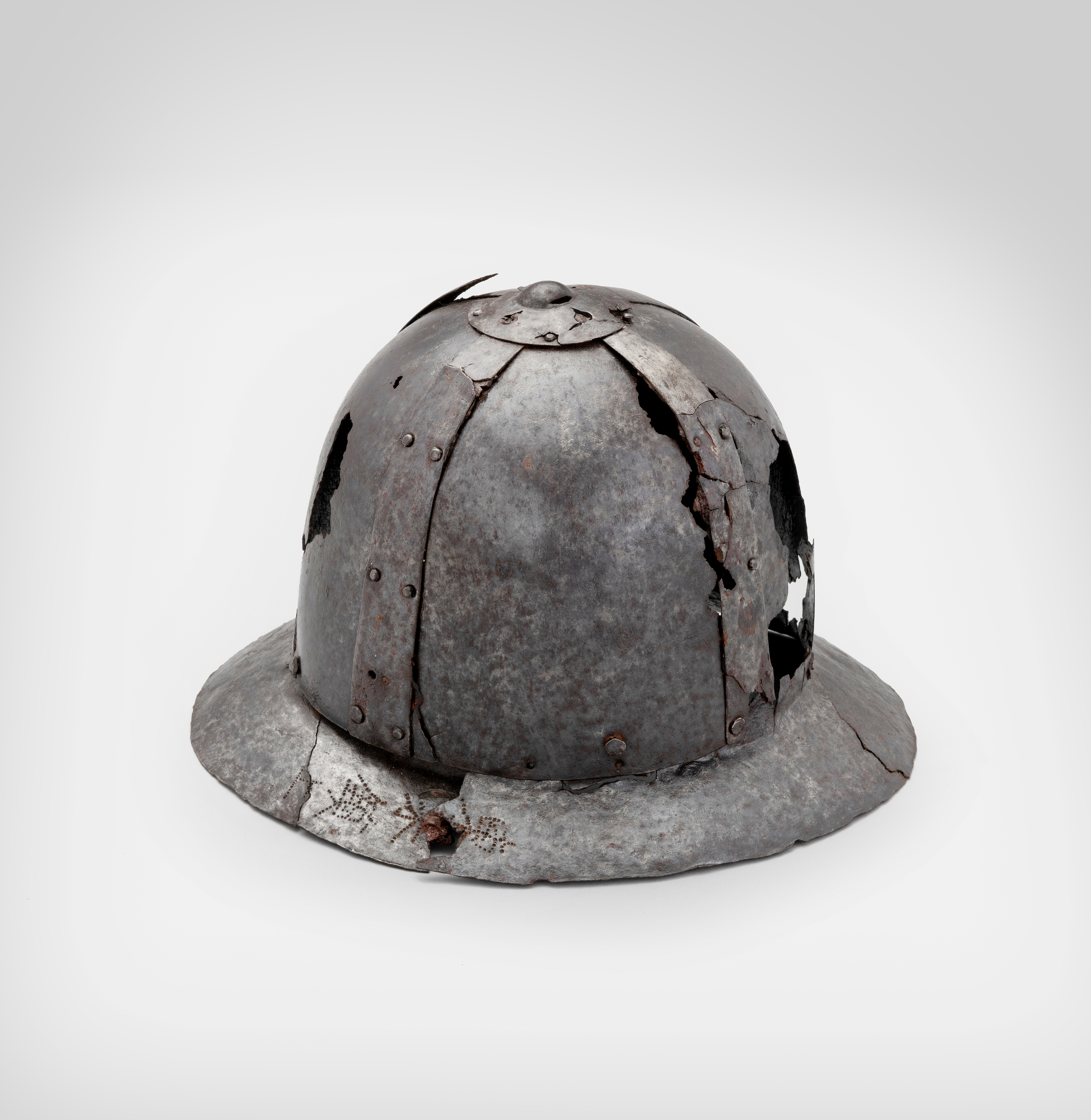
Iron Helmet from the Imjin War(첨주형 투구)

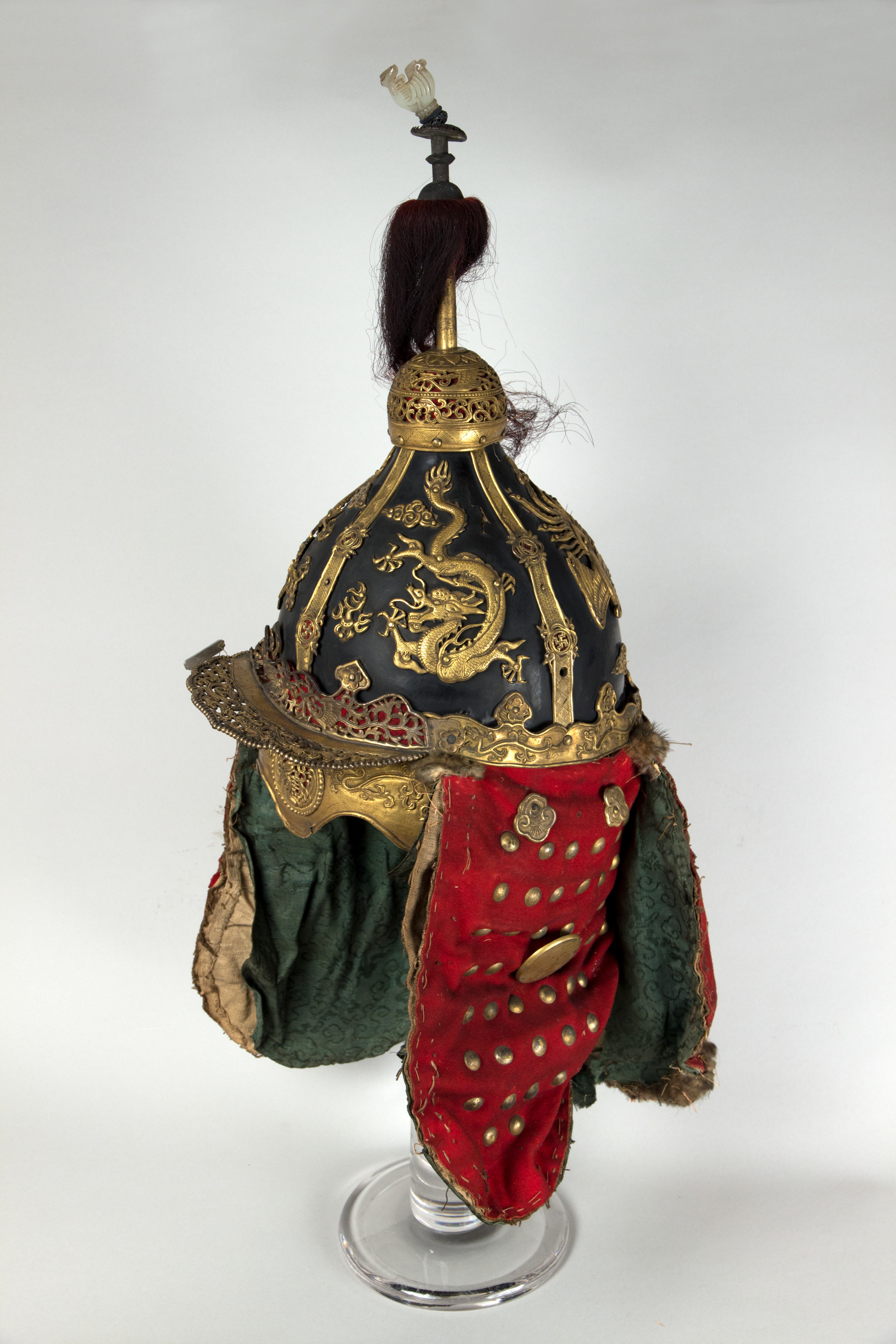
Helmet, Joseon(두정투구)

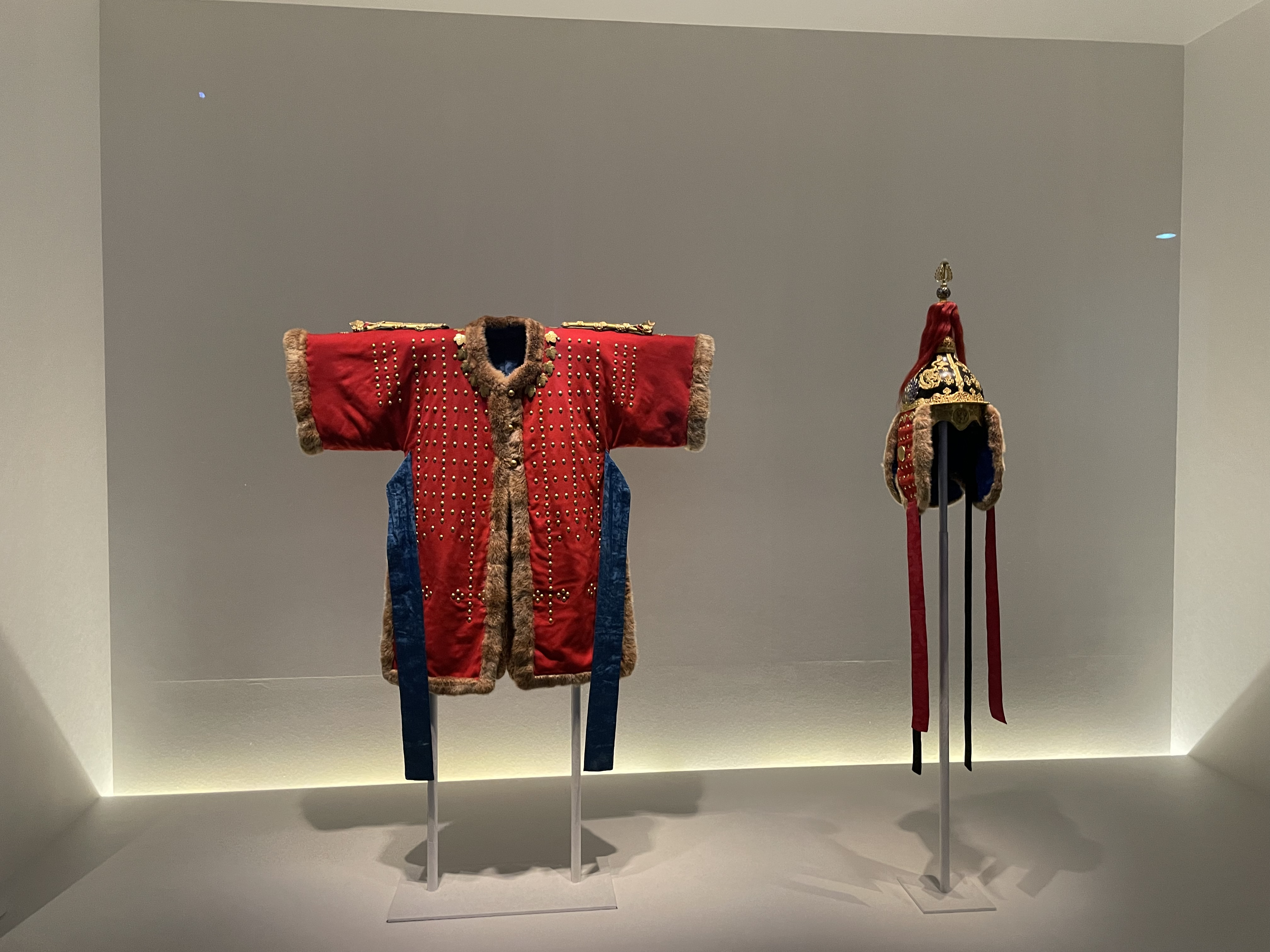
Brigandine, Dujeong-gap(두정갑)

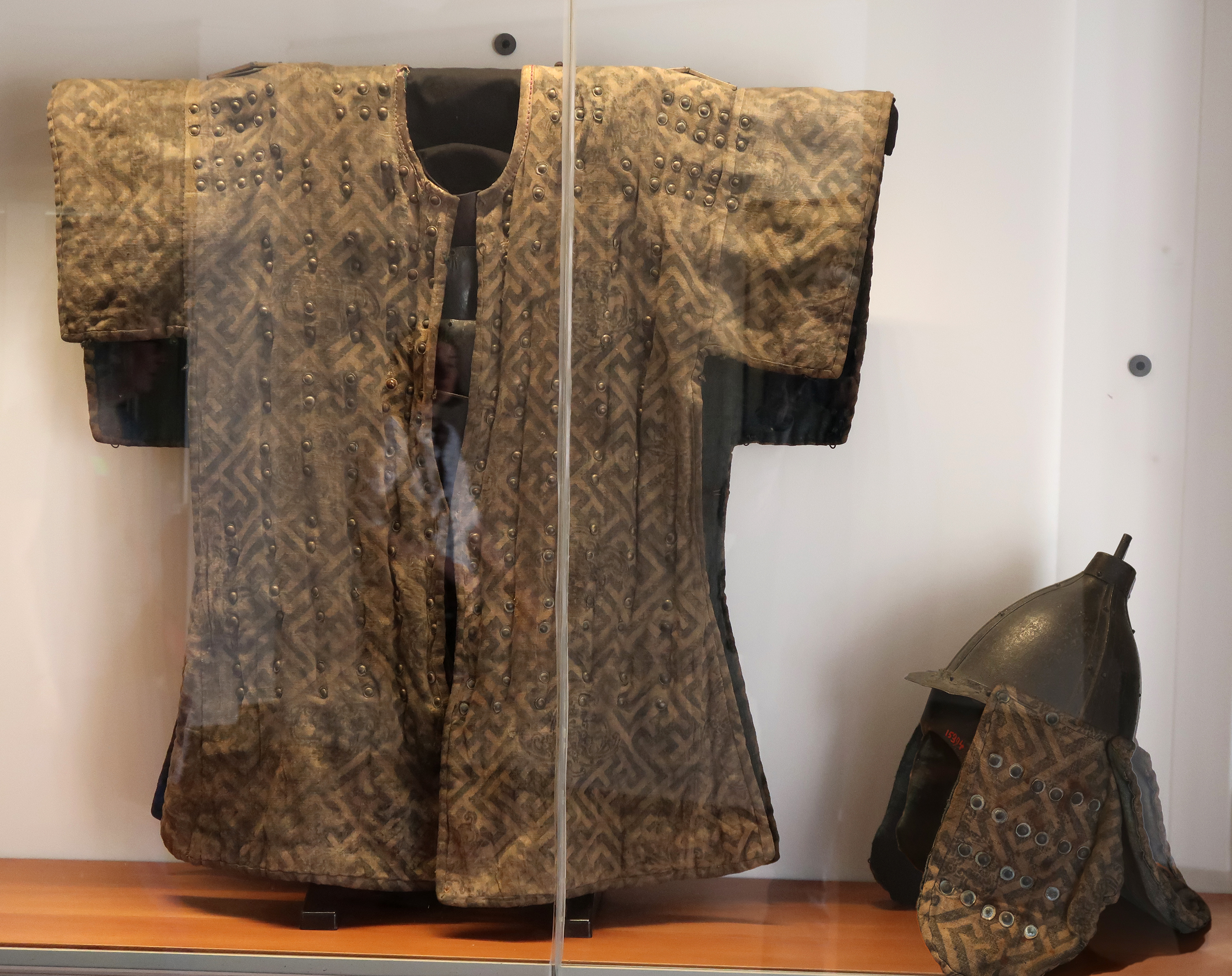
Brigandine armour, Joseon(두정갑)

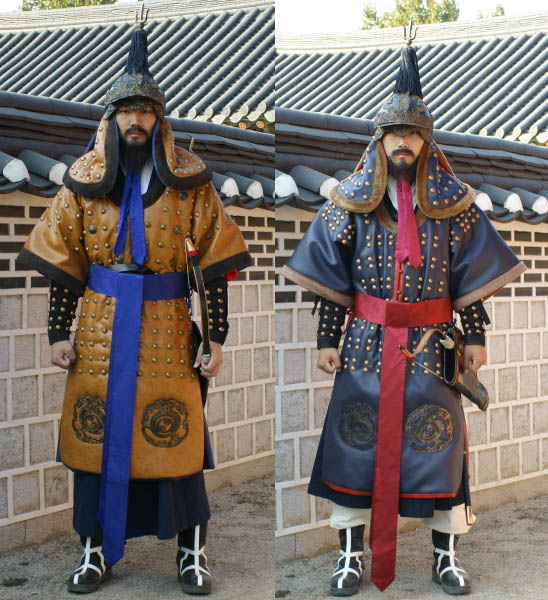
Modern reenactors wearing a complete Dujeong-gap set. While conventionally shown as red, the fabric is made of various colors.

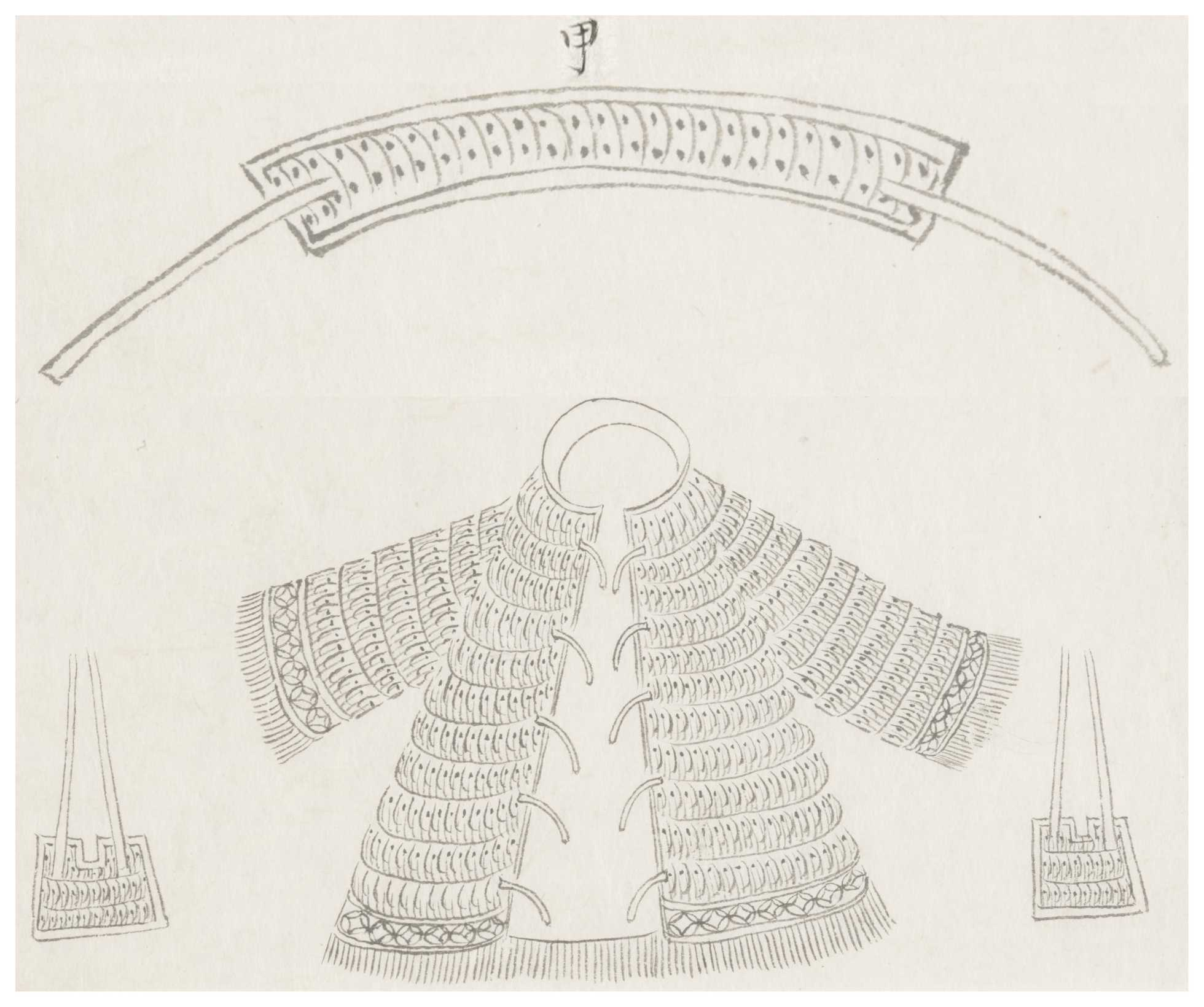
Lamellar armour of Joseon(유엽갑)

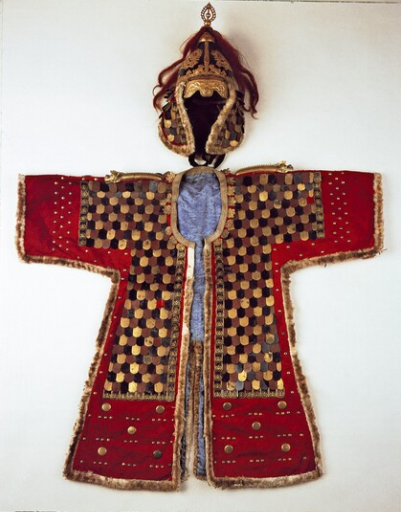
Scale armour set, Duseokrin-gap(두석린갑) at Wereldmuseum Leiden

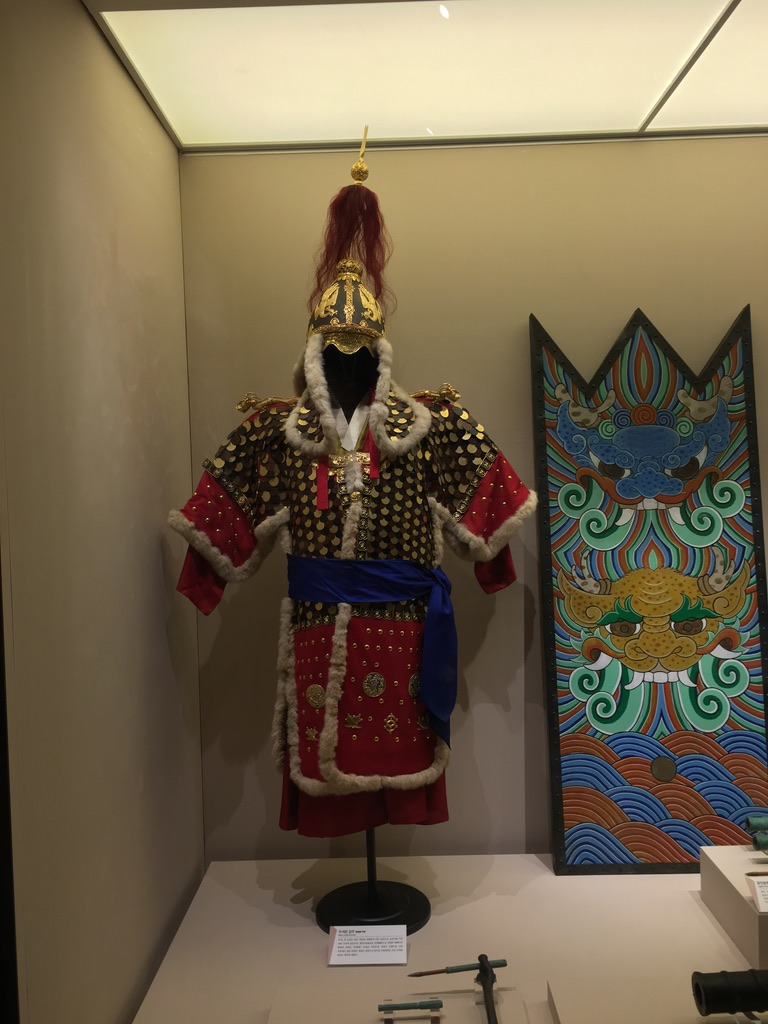
Duseokrin-gap(두석린갑)

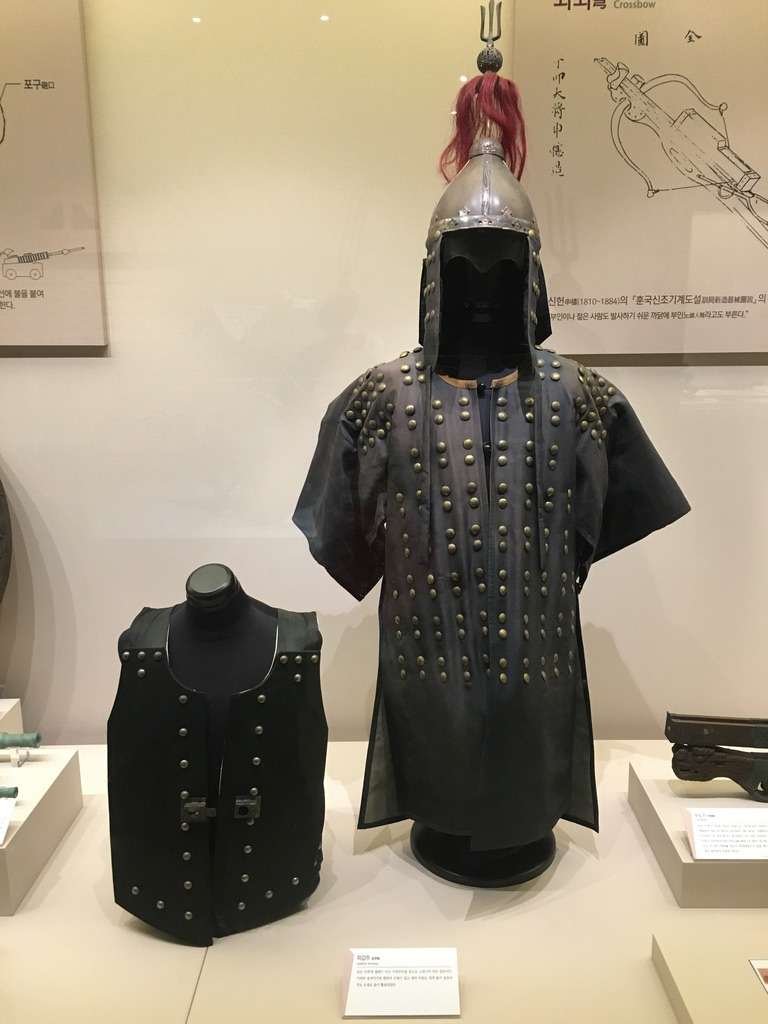
Sets of armour worn by peasant conscripts(엄심갑)

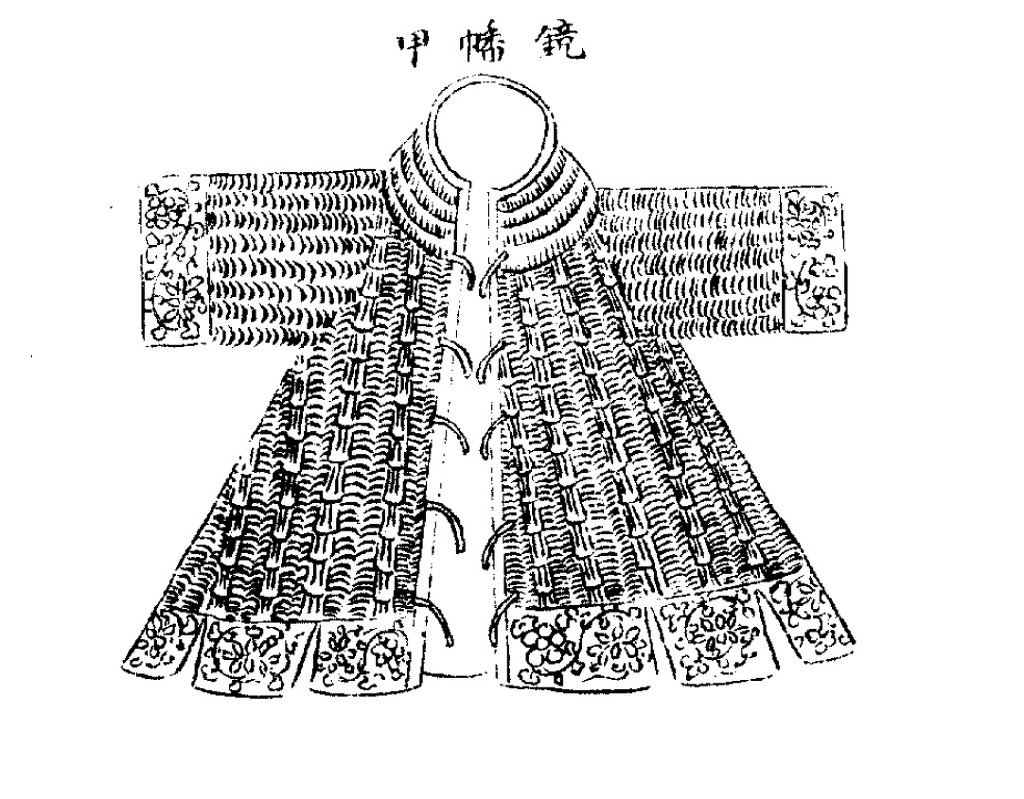
14th century Mail and plate

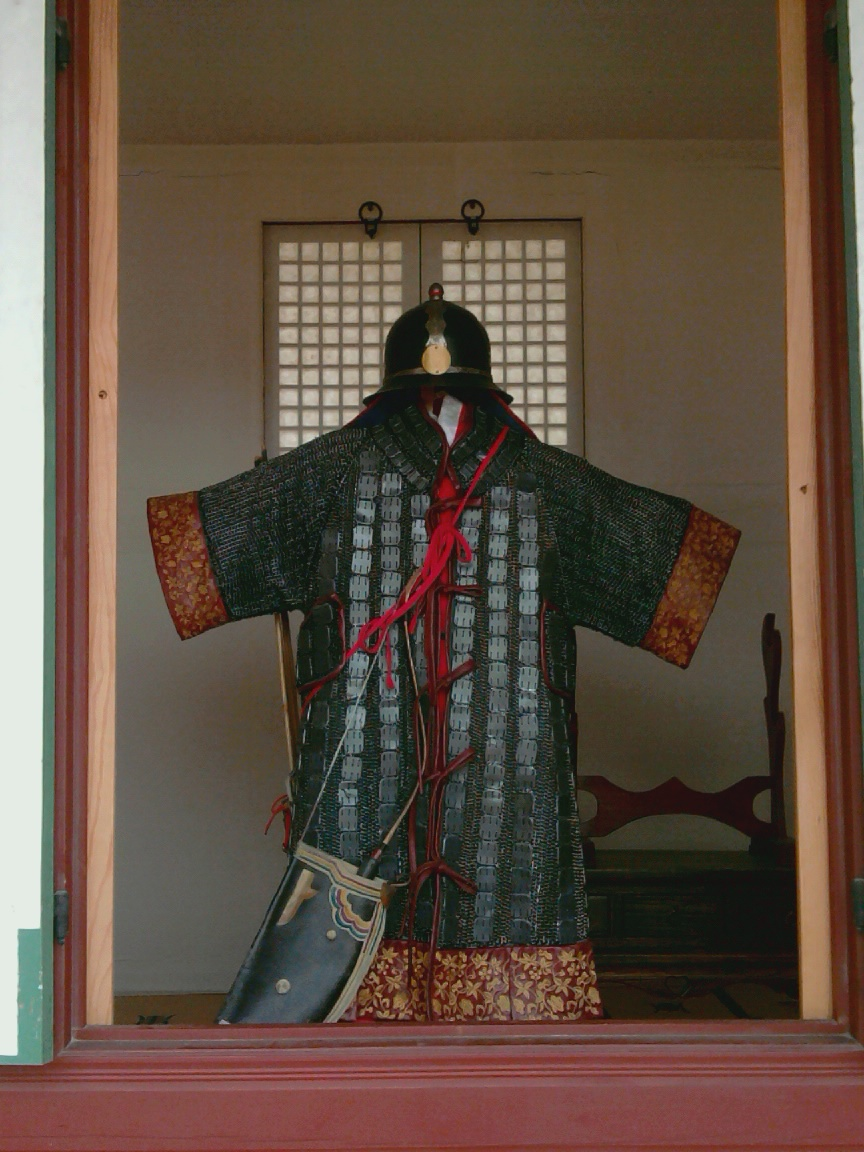
Mail and plate(경번갑) and Iron helmet

== See also ==
- Korean sword
- Korean knife
- Korean martial arts
- Plated mail - armours similar to Gyeongbeon-gap (경번갑/鏡幡甲)
