= Vietnamese armour =

Type of armor

Vietnamese armour (Vietnamese: áo giáp Việt Nam, chữ Hán: 襖甲越南) is military body armour made in the region of Vietnam.

== Pre-history to 2nd-century ==
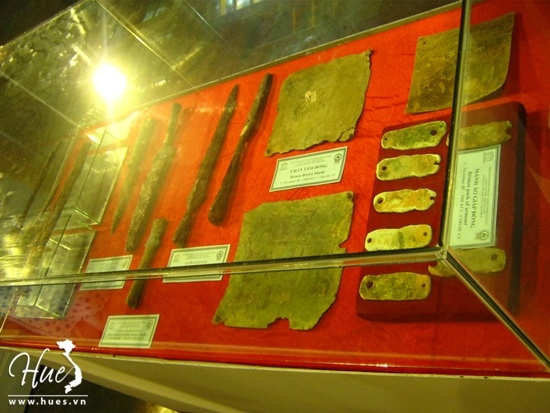
Đông Sơn lamellar armor

History does not provide records of the development of armour in Bronze Age and Iron Age Vietnam. Physical relics are the only source for studying the origins of the practice.

The most common type found in Northern Vietnam is mirror armour, which is a square or rectangular metal or wooden plate fastened to the warrior's chest. This type of armour could provide protection against slashing and glancing blows. For limb protection, bronze vambraces and greaves, sometimes shaped like multiple rings were coiled around the wearer's forearms and legs although they were cast as single pieces. Most vambraces and greaves have small tintinnabulums attached to them. This is a feature seen also in later armour.

Less common is lamellar armour, which consists of small metal scales fastened together to provide flexible protection. A full set of lamellar armour has not been found, but quantifies of individual scales survive. Each scale has two holes for a connector, suggesting that the method of construction may have been different from Chinese and Korean counterparts. It is not yet understood whether lamellar and mirror armour were used in conjunction or worn separately.

== 3rd to 19th-century ==
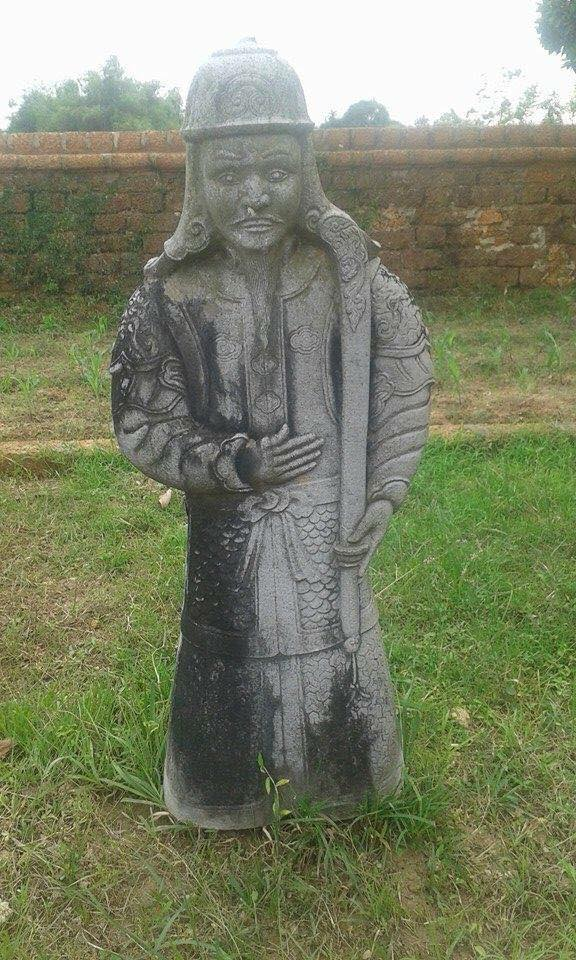
Armor of Revival Lê dynasty

Physical evidence of Middle Age and pre-modern Vietnamese armour found by far is rare. Evidence is acquired almost solely through depictions in historical texts and arts. History of Song informs that in 981, the Song was victorious over Annam and took ten thousands suits of armour as booty.

Armour were fabricated from various materials. The better known are iron and leather. Warlord Nguyễn Nộn wore a suit of iron that failed to protect him from a pike thrust in his back. The Compilation of Lê Dynasty's customs noted that each magistrate of each county or market was required to collect 100 buffalo hides and 2 horns each hide to fashion armours and weapons.

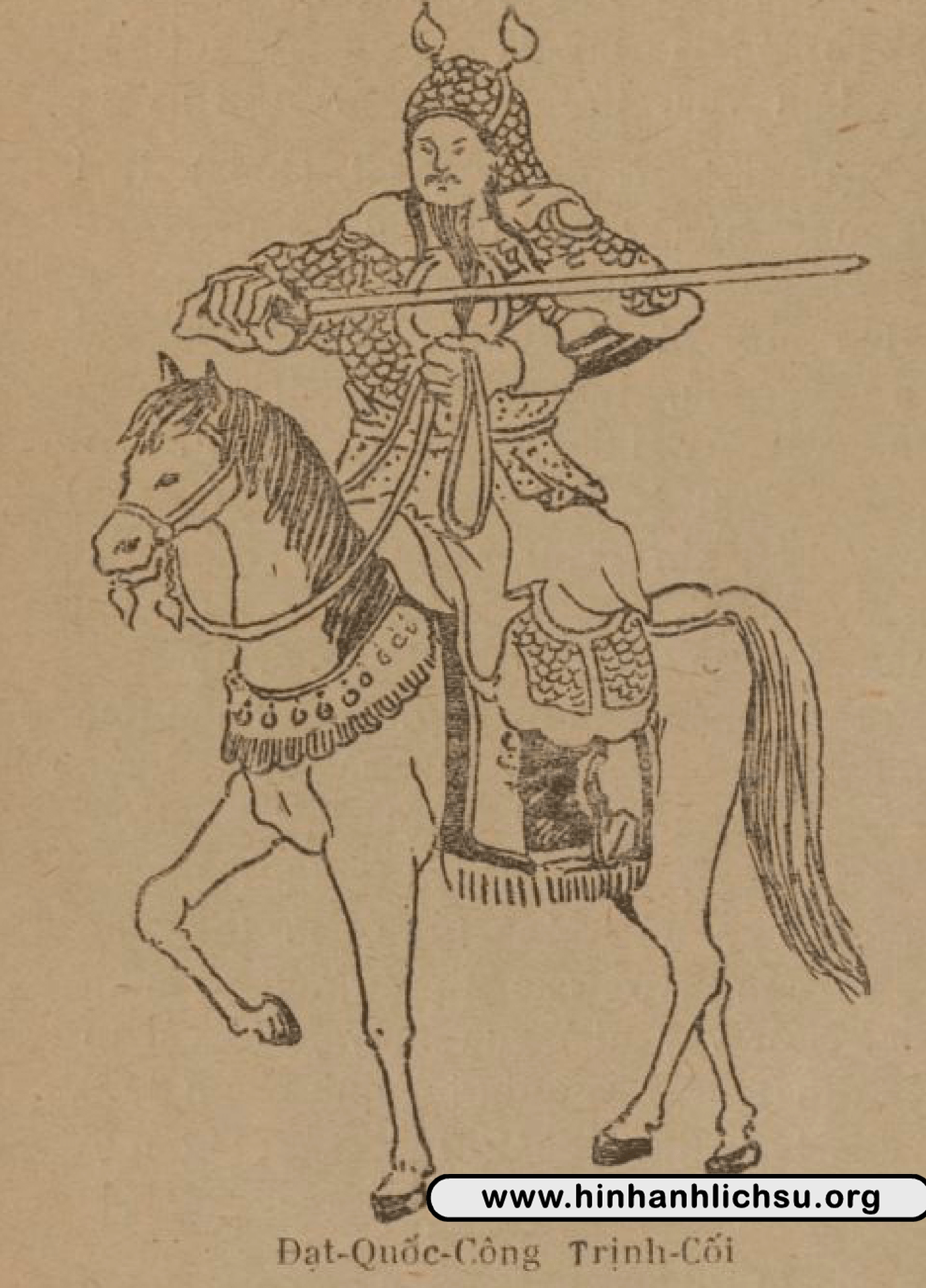
Painting of Trịnh Cối (?–1584) wearing armor under the Later Lê dynasty

== Gallery ==
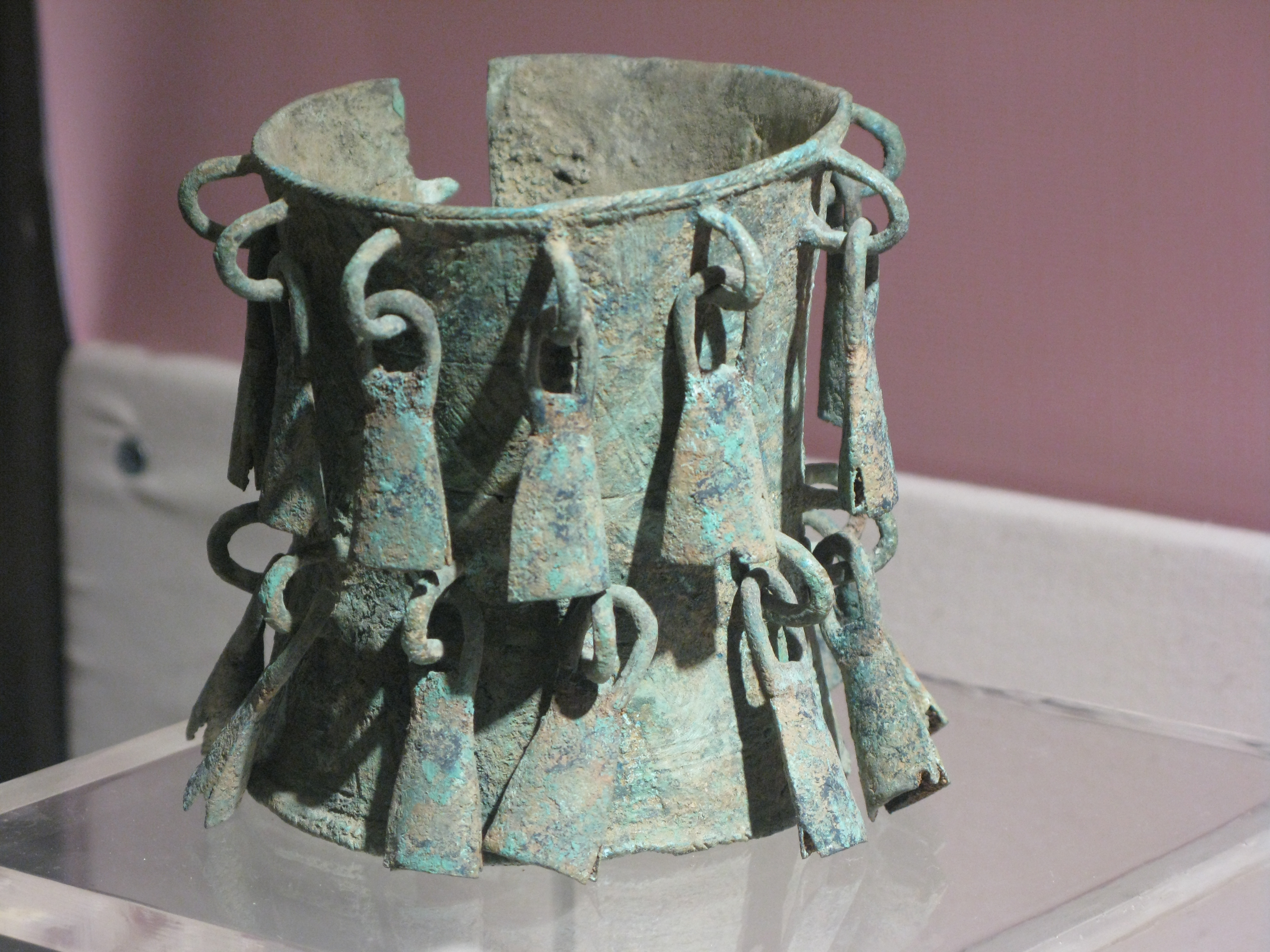
Bronze greave - 4th BC.

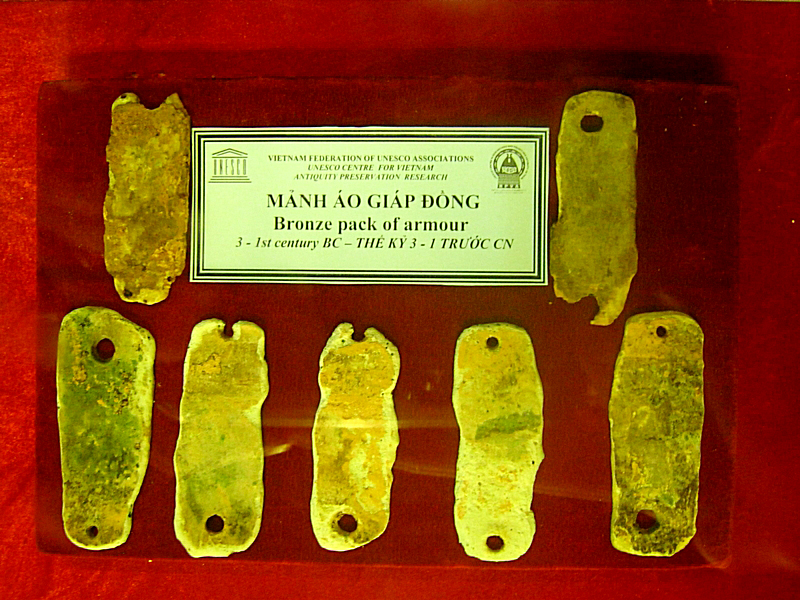
Bronze lamellae - 3rd to 1st BC.

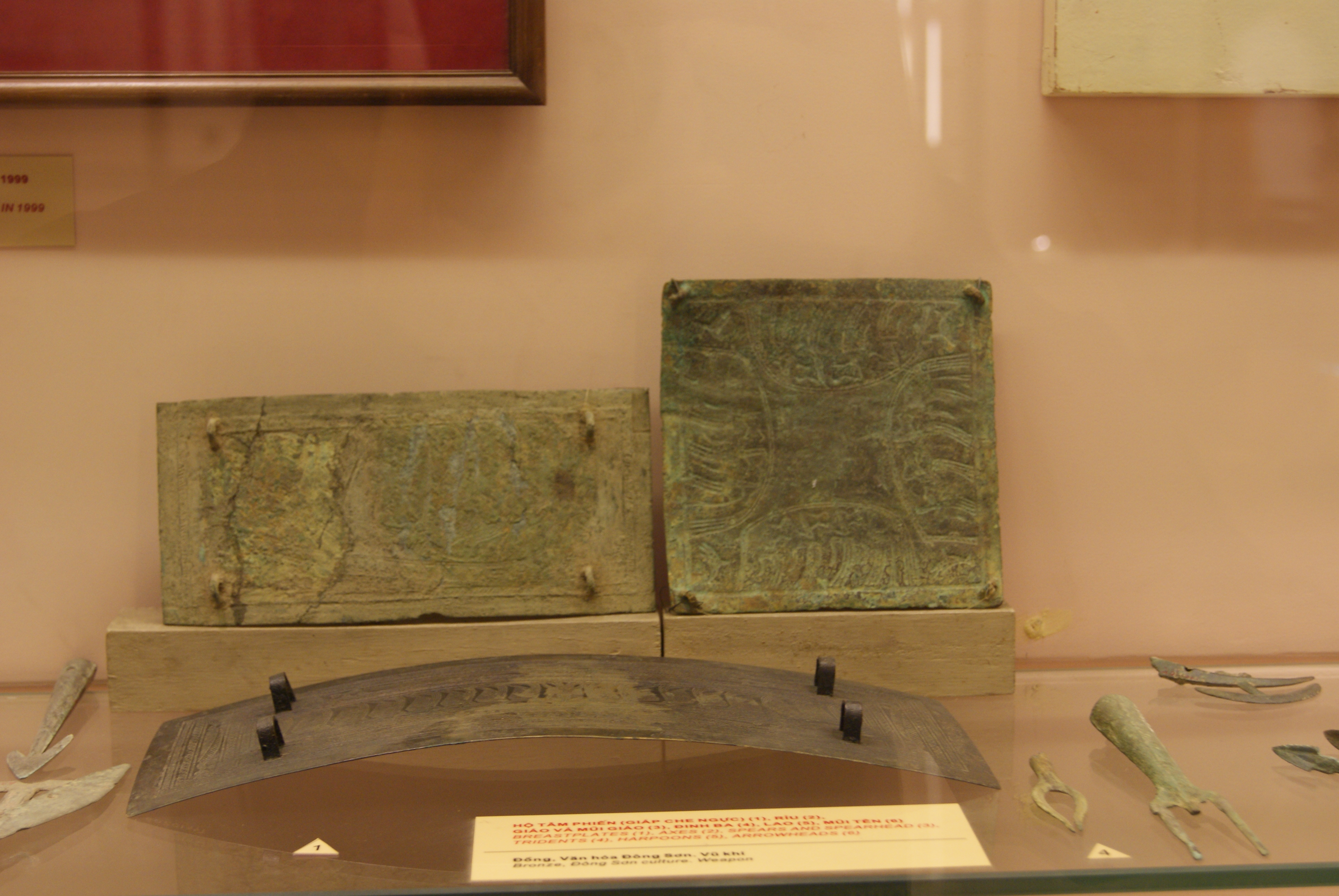
Breastplate in the Đông Sơn period

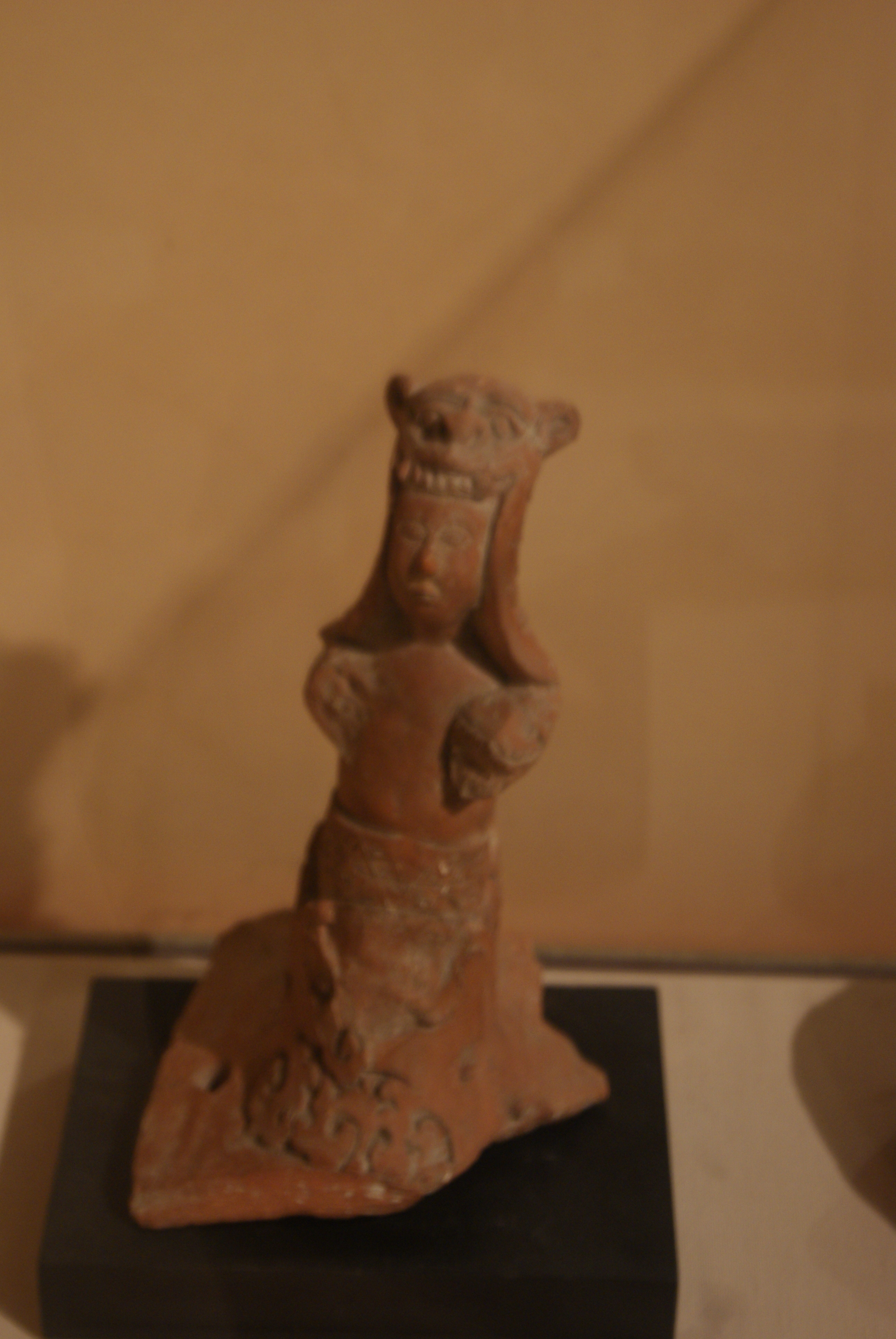
Small figurine of an armoured warrior with lion helmet - 13th century.

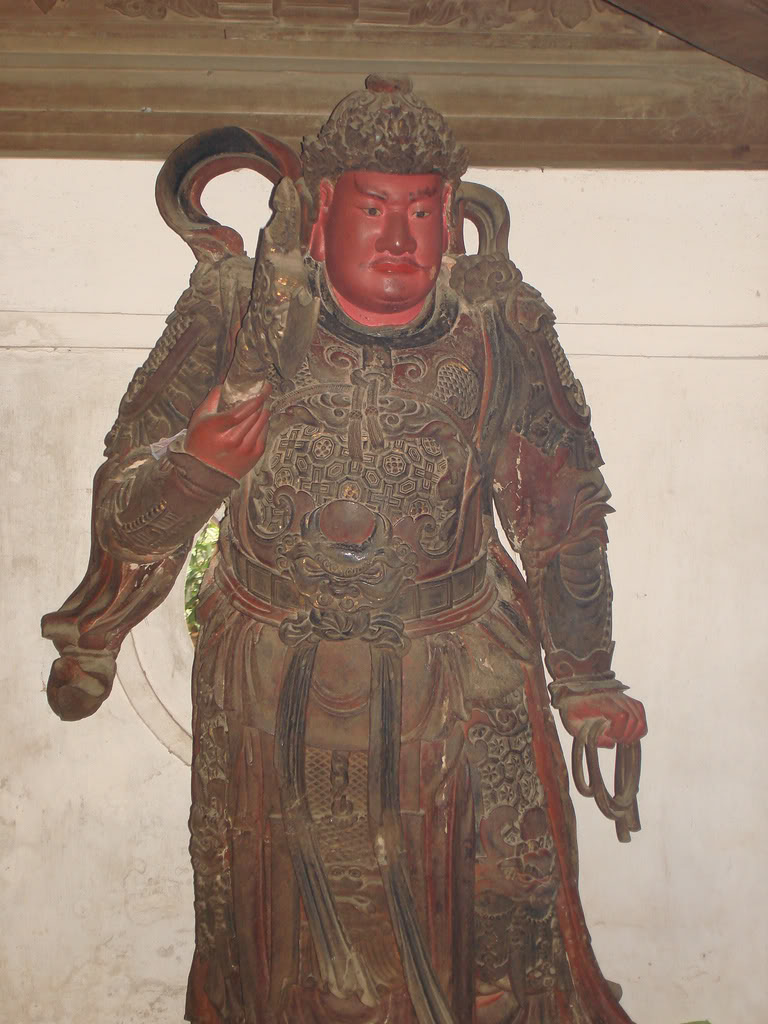
Lacquered wood statue of a Guardian King of Buddhism, Tây Phương Temple, Hanoi.

== See also ==
- Lamellar armour
- Mirror armour
- Military history of Vietnam
