= Hwandudaedo =

Ancient Korean sword variety

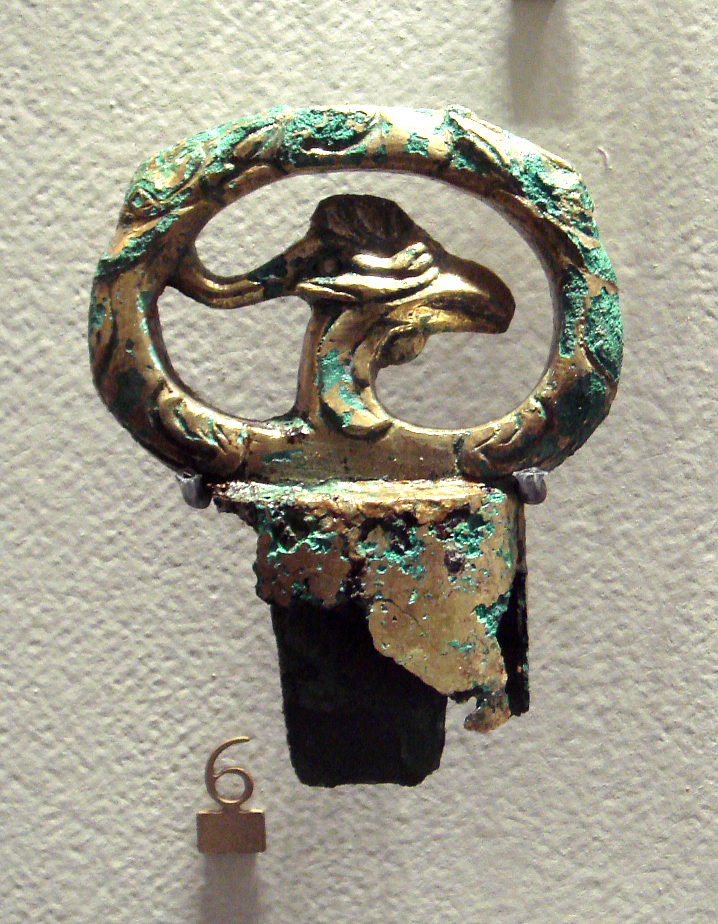

Korean name
- Hangul: 환두대도
- Hanja: 環頭大刀
- RR: hwandudaedo
- MR: hwandudaedo

Hwandudaedo (Korean: 환두대도; lit. ''sword with ring pommel' or 'ring-pommelled sword'') is the modern Korean language term for one of the earliest original types of Korean sword, which appeared in the Proto–Three Kingdoms period. These swords were at first symbols of a ruler's power, but their availability increased in the 5th century, and they became a more widespread symbol of military or political rank. The frequency of finds declines in the 6th century.

In the ancient period during Baekje dynasty, this sword spread from Baekje to other regions, including Japanese archipelago.

The hwandu-daedo was a large military sword designed for battle, with a thick back and a sharpened blade. This sword's name was given because of the round shape of the pommel (modern Korean 대도 daedo). The swords were richly decorated, with inlay work and, especially, elaborate pommel shapes.

Hwandudaedo subtypes are distinguished by decoration. They are known in Korean as Sohwandudaedo (no decoration on the pommel rings), Samyeophwandudaedo (pommel ring with three opened leaves), Samruhwan-dudaedo (three pommel rings forming a triangle), Yonghwandu-daedo (pommel with a dragon), Bonghwandu-daedo (pommel with phoenix), Bonghwang-mun (a pattern of a legendary bird), and others.

Korean swords in Joeson period are called Hwando.

== See also ==
- Hwando
