= Sơn Vi culture =

Culture of the late Palaeolithic and early Mesolithic Age in Vietnam

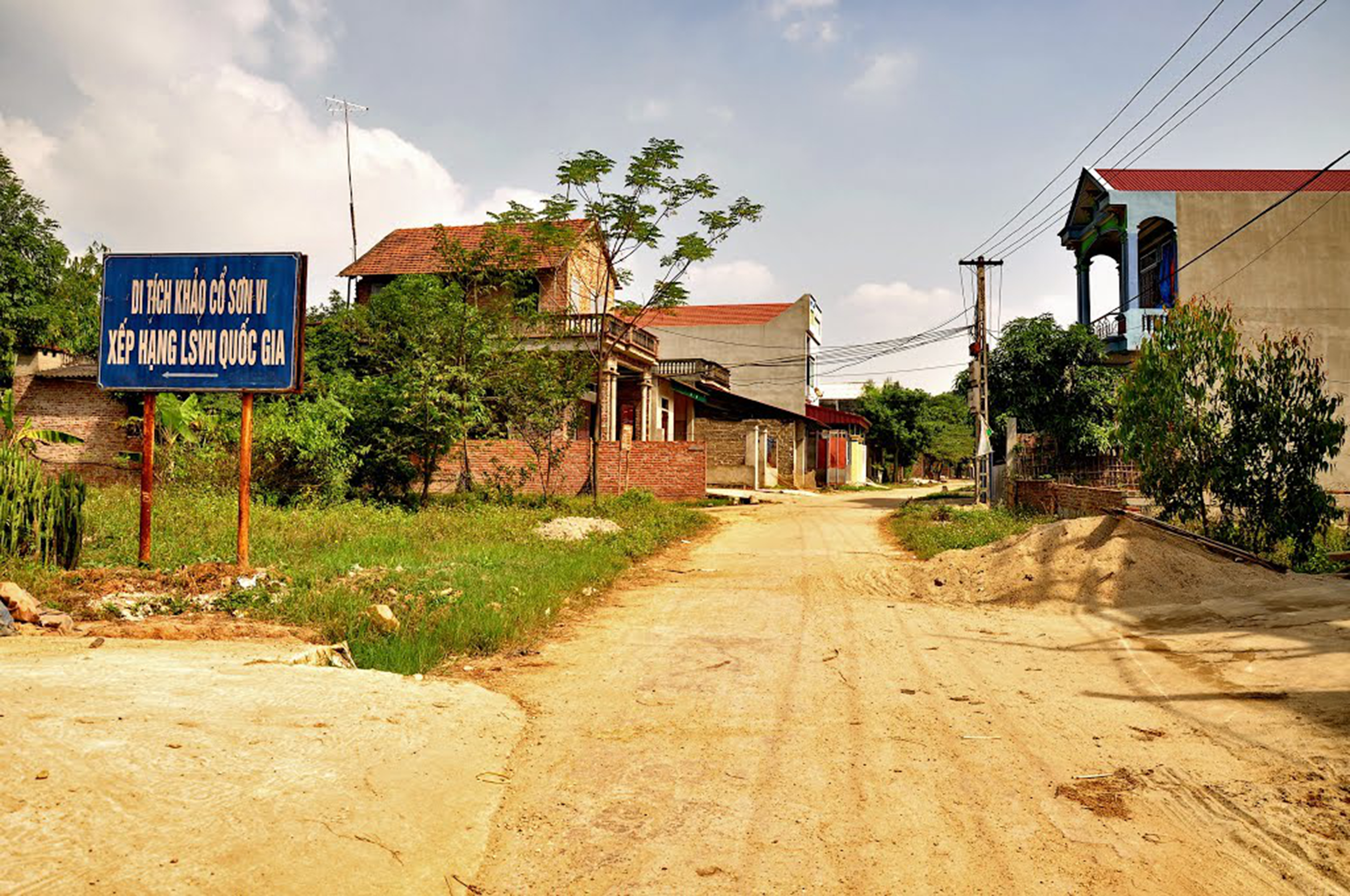
Son Vi site in 2013

The Sơn Vi culture is the name given to a culture of the late Palaeolithic and early Mesolithic in Vietnam, which preceding the Hòa Bình culture.

It's named after Sơn Vi (vi), a commune (xã) in Lâm Thao District, Phú Thọ Province, where relics from this culture were first founded.
