= Korean knife =

Korean knives are a sub-division of Korean swords in that both have been used or are used for martial arts purposes, and as well in the martial arts. This article gives a brief introduction to this interesting field within the greater sphere of Korean martial arts.

== Korean knife fighting ==
In Korean dramas depicting ancient times, knives are often used. Usually, assassins and pirates used them to kill government officials or immobilize guards.

Korean knives were either thrown at the target or the assailant would creep up behind the guard and slice his throat.

=== Types of knives ===
all of them have sheathes

- Dan Geom (small knife, usually with a curved hilt) (단검)
- Bi Su (hidden knife, commonly used by assassins) (비수), also used for combat in Hapkido
- Jang Do (small knife used for self-defense, usually carried by women) (장도)

== Korean knife making masters ==
- Choe Yong-Mook (초용묵)
- Park Yong-Ki (박용기)
- Choi Sang-Gil (최상길)

== See also ==
- Korean sword
