= Korean swordsmanship =

Art and skill of the sword in Korea

- Hangul: 검술
- Hanja: 劍術
- RR: geomsul
- MR: kŏmsul

Since the 1970s, there has been a revival of traditional or reconstructed methods of swordsmanship (劍術 geom sul, or 劍法 geom beop) based on the Korean sword in South Korea (Korean Bon Kuk Geom Beop 본국검법 "National Sword Methods"), supplementing and influencing the creation and practice of Kumdo (the Korean martial art influenced by Japanese Kendo, Muyedobot'ongji and Wubei Zhi). There are historical sources on which such reconstructions are based, dating to the 17th and 18th centuries, notably the Muyejebo (“Martial Arts Illustrations”) of 1610, its 1759 revision Muyeshinbo, supplemented with 12 additional fighting methods by Prince Sado who originated the term Sip Pal Ki (“Eighteen Fighting Methods”), and the renewed revision of 1790, Muyedobotongji.

Korean sword practice entails the study and use of one or more of five sword architectures: the single-handed sabre (To); the single-handed sword (Geom); the two-handed saber (Ssangsoodo); the Spear Sword polearm (Hyup Do); and the Glaive polearm (Wol Do).

Any of these weapons can be studied following one of two disciplines. The study of Korean sword as a weapons system is commonly called Geom Beop ("sword methods") while the use of sword study as a form of personal development or sport is commonly called Geom Do (검도, 劍道) "Way of the Sword") which is adaptation of Japanese Kendo (剣道). In either case, additional equipment and practices have been added to further the study and safety of the subject. These include but are not limited to body armor (Ho-gu, Japanese: Bōgu) bamboo swords (Juk-To, Japanese: Shinai) and wooden swords (Mok-Geom, Japanese: bokken) and a range of materials for piercing or cutting.

== Historical background ==
=== Early history ===
Production of Korean swords starts in the 4th century with the Hwandudaedo or "ring-pommel swords". No direct accounts of swordsmanship during the Three Kingdoms of Korea are extant, but there are 12th-century historiographical works (Samguk Sagi, "History of the Three Kingdoms" by Kim Bu-sik, 1145; Samguk Yusa, "Memorabilia of the Three Kingdoms") which attest that systematic training of martial skills existed in each of the three early Korean states. In the ancient period during Baekje dynasty, this sword spread from Baekje to other regions. According to the research of Professor Suh Yeong-kyo, a specialist in ancient Korean history, evidence indicates that a culture of combat—such as one-on-one duels using melee weapons among heavy cavalrymen existed in ancient Korea, including during the Three Kingdoms period.

Archaeological evidence suggests that straight double-edged and single-edged swords remained prominent during the North South States Period. But with the beginning of the Goryeo era (10th century), advances in metallurgy led to the abandonment of the straight sword in favor of the curved blade.

=== Joseon era ===
The earliest written sources on military training in Korea date to the 17th century. An organized approach to Korean sword was documented in the Army Account of Military Arts and Science (Chinese: 武備志; pinyin: Wǔ Bèi Zhì), a Ming dynasty strategy book written in 1629 by Mao Yuanyi. In his work, Mao identifies Korean fencing (Chinese: 朝鮮勢法; pinyin: Cháoxiǎn shìfǎ) as a series of sword methods originating from the area of Korea. Mao reports that these methods had been brought to China during a time when Chinese sword work had declined and were ascribed to about the 9th century by Mao, or about the time nearing the end of the Unified Silla Period.

The traditional straight type was revived as a type of "dress sword," carried as a badge of office by scholars and bureaucrats during the Joseon Dynasty (1392-1897). With the rise of Neo-Confucianism in Korea during the 16th century, long and pointed items came to be seen as "aggressive" by Confucian standards. these swords were commonly short, single-handed weapons with blunted tips. Often heavily decorated, these items tended to be more symbolic, but could be pressed into service for self-defense. Among the Military, curved, single-handed sabers (To) were the preferred side-arm.

The Muyejebo ("Martial Arts Illustrations") was published in 1610. This is the oldest native Korean martial arts manual. It was commissioned by King Sunjo (1567-1608), and compiled by one of the king’s military officers, Han Kyo. It covered six disciplines, including the Ssangsudo or "two-handed sabre."

The Joseon military was described by Hendrick Hamel in 1667, who observed that, "The horsemen always wear a suit of armor and helmet. They carry a sword, a bow and arrows and a kind of flail with sharp points. The soldiers wear suits of armor and helmets, have muskets, swords and short pikes and carry 50 shots... Each city appoints a number of monks from the monasteries in its surroundings to maintain the fortresses and strongholds in the mountains. In times of great need these monks are used as soldiers. They are armed with sword, bow and arrows." Korean sword-work had plainly fallen to being only one of many options for the Korean warrior.

During the reign of King Youngjo (1724–1776), the Muyejebo was revised and supplemented with 12 additional fighting methods by Crown Prince Sado, as the Muyesinbo (1759). The sword features more prominently in this compilation, supplementing the older Ssangsudo section with coverage of the Yedo (short sword), Bonkuk geom ("national sword"), Ssang geom (twin swords) and four variants of Japanese swordsmanship

King Cheongjo (1776–1800) had the Muyesinbo revised by Park Je-ga and Lee Duk-moo, supplemented with six equestrian disciplines, and published 1790 as the Muyedobotongji. Of special note is the introduction by the editors, included to address a variety of shortcomings noted in the introduction to the work. These diagrams, found at the end of chapters, structured training into a succession of techniques and have often inspired the execution of the material in each chapter as a single form (hyeong) rather than a series of techniques.

=== Modern history ===
Traditional Korean swordsmanship fell into decline with the modernization of the army, beginning as King Kojong hired Japanese Lt. Horimoto Reizo to train the Pyolgigm, or "Special Skills Force" to march and shoot in European fashion in 1881. And in 1883, Japan accepted 40 Korean candidates for enrollment in various Japanese schools of commerce and technology. Half of this number were also enrolled in the Toyama Military Academy to be trained as officers for duty in the future Korean army. Distracted by events in other parts of the World, Western influences on the development of Korean Military Science lost out to Japanese designs. In this way, developments in Japan regarding sword practice had immediate impact on Korean sword practices. As Japan had adopted German and French sabre material for their Police forces, these practices were implemented with the Korean Police following the Kabo Reforms of 1894. Korean police cadets at the Kyongmuchong or Police Academy were required to learn Kyok Geom (Japanese Gekki ken aka kenjutsu) as one of its training subjects.

Japanese found the use of European single-handed sabers inadequate against Japan's larger Russian adversaries in the Russo-Japanese War (1905-5) and in 1933 re-instituted the two-handed saber as the official Japanese sidearm for officers and non-commissioned officers. Koreans associated with the Japanese such as Korean Police and Military Officers-in-training did likewise. With the occupation of Korea by Japan in 1910, Japanese sword practices increasingly supplanted Korean sword work in the urban areas. This was enhanced by the acceptance of Kendo in the Korean educational system in 1931 as well as a series of high-profile competitions between Korean and Japanese players during the 1930s and 1940s.

In 1920, the Choson Chaeyukhoe (Choson Athletics Association) was established, and a year later, Kang Nak-won opened Choson Mudogwan, the country's first private school to teach Kumdo exclusively. Japanese Military sword was also reinforced by the efforts of Japanese sword master Nakamura Taisoburo who was stationed in Manchuria at this time. Drawing on the calligrapher's repeated practice of the character "Ei" with its eight basic strokes, Nakamura develops Ei-Ji Happo (literally: "8 Laws of the Character Ei ") as a drill for practicing the basic cuts and thrusts of his sword material. This would later be formalized into "Happo-giri" (literally: "Eight Directions of Cutting") and become an integral part of his style, Nakamura-Ryu Batto-jutsu.

In the modern Republic of Korea, Kendo, as in the case of other Japanese elements, remained in Korean culture albeit renamed as Kumdo with little or no emphasis on its Japanese connections. Early efforts to resurrect traditional Korean practices such as Ssireum (wrestling), Taek Kyon (Martial Sport) and Geom Beop (sword method) was part of the discourse on post-1945 Korean nationalist historiography and encountered strong opposition by elements in Korean Society that felt such practices recalled anachronistic culture of pre-Occupation Korea.

Changes in the political fortunes in Korea since the 1980s, including the easing of repressive governmental oversight, has allowed for a renewed interest in practices and traditions of Koreas' Martial past, producing a number of groups who seek to showcase these activities, such as the Sib Pal Gi Preservation Society (2001).

== Joseon era swordsmanship ==
The study of Korean sword study is conducted in a variety of practices including exercises and drills, single person form, two-person form and validation cutting. Seen as a zero-sum circumstance, the excess of any one element can only mean a deficit concerning the other two elements. In each case, an activity is meant to instill in the swordsman a near-reflexive ability to assess a circumstance and execute the appropriate meld of these elements to produce the intended outcome. For this reason practitioners rely heavily on the use of cutting targets of various materials to demonstrate successful outcomes concerning any particular technique.

Noticeably absent in the Korean sword methods are tactics and strategies associated with individualized engagements such as dueling as found in European and Japanese traditions. Though not unfamiliar with affairs of honor, Korean culture is dominated by Buddhist and Neo-Confucian thought, both of which proscribe the use of violence. Therefore, Korean swordwork can be said to have been shaped primarily by Military practice and utilized most often in a melee environment requiring awareness of a variety of vectors and angles apart from directly to the front.

A cursory examination of Bon Kuk Geom Beop reveals that of the 26 sword methods, 5 are thrusting methods and 15 are cutting or slashing methods. In like manner Military sword work introduced to the Korean Military during the Japanese Occupation (Toyama Ryu) is also heavily skewed in favor of cutting over thrusting. Lastly, techniques associated with Korean Geom Beop reveal a ratio of roughly 12 cutting techniques to 4 thrusting techniques.

The use of the shield was not successfully integrated into the Korean Military despite its mention in a variety of Korean historical manuals. Korean sword, then, integrates a variety of parries which are intended to redirect the opponent's attack and produce an opportunity (K. Teum) for the defender to counter the attack. These parries are most often accomplished with the use of the spine of the sword or the sides of the blade rather than with the blade edge.

=== Bon Kuk Geom Beop ===
"Native Sword Methods" (K. Bon Kuk Geom Beop - 본국검법) is first identified in Korean legends of the Kingdom of Silla, one of the domains comprising "The Three Kingdoms" Period (37 BC – 660 AD). The Yuji Sungnam relates a story of a seven-year-old boy from the Silla Kingdom who traveled across the Kingdom of Paekshe, demonstrating his "sword dance" (gummu) and drawing large crowds. However, when finally summoned to perform his dance before the king, the boy ended his performance by plunging his sword into the king, killing him, and was, in turn, cut down by the king's retainers. In honor of the young boy's sacrifice, the Silla people created a masked sword dance resembling the boy's face.

The earliest written account of these sword methods is found in the encyclopedic work Army Account of Military Arts and Science (Chinese: 武備志; pinyin: Wǔ Bèi Zhì), written in 1629 by Mao Yuan-I. In his work Mao, identifies Korean fencing (Chinese: 朝鮮勢法; pinyin: Cháoxiǎn shìfǎ) as a series of sword methods originating from the area of Korea. These methods, identified only as "Native Sword Methods" (Bon Kuk Geom Beop - 본국검법) had, according to Mao, been brought to China during a time when Chinese sword work had declined and were ascribed to about the 9th century.

With the revisions of the Muyedobotongji (1790) the authors sought to overcome perceived short-comings in earlier materials by including a "Complete Illustrations addendum to certain chapters, most notably those concerning sword-work. Meant originally as a sequential drill of sword techniques intended to catalog the contents of the chapter, these addendums have become stylized exercises for modern Martial Arts practitioners. The Muyedobotongji generally, and the Bon Kuk Geom Beop chapter in particular, may be cataloged as military manuals, meaning that they provide only an overview of the information necessary for personnel to perform their duties.

=== Eighteen skills ===
The "skills" set forth in the Muyeshinbo concern various armed and unarmed disciplines and are not limited to swordsmanship. Of the six disciplines of the original Muyejebo, only the sixth deals with the sword: 1. staff (gonbang), 2. shield (deungpae), 3. multi-pronged spear (nangseon) 4. long spear (jangchang), 5. three-pronged spear (dangpa) and 6. two-handed sword (ssangsudo).

Of the twelve additional disciplines of the Muyeshinbo, eight concern bladed weapons:

- Yedo (short sword)
- Wae geom (Japanese sword)
- Gyojeon (sword sparring techniques)
- Woldo (moon-sword)
- Hyeopdo (spear-sword)
- Ssang geom (twin swords)
- Jedok geom (admiral sword)
- Bonguk geom (traditional Korean sword)

The remaining three being Jukjangchang (long bamboo spear), Gichang (spear with flag), pyeongon (flail) and gwonbeop (unarmed fighting).

=== Twenty-six methods ===
Muyedobotongji identifies 26 methods for using a sword through the recombination of basic body movements, cuts and thrusts. With the repetition of some methods, the total number of executed methods in this text is 33. Consistent with Ming writing form, each method is assigned a poetic name intended to embody the nature of the sword method.

- Method 1: Jikum Dae Jukse (“Hold the Sword; Face the Enemy”)
- Method 2: Woo Nae Ryak (“Turn to the Right”)
- Method 3: Jinjun Kyuk Jukse (“Advance Forward to Attack the Enemy”)
- Method 4: Gumkye Doklipse (“Golden Rooster Stands on One Leg”)
- Method 5: Hoo Il Kyuk Se (Rear Single Strike)
- Method 6: Il Jase (Thrusting Stance)
- Method 7: Maeng Ho Unlinse (“Wild Tiger Hides in the Forest”)
- Method 8: An Jase (“Wild Goose Character”)
- Method 9: Jikbu Songsuse (“Jik-boo sends a scroll”)
- Method 10: Balcho Shimase ( “Parting the Grass, Searching for the Snake”)
- Method 11: Pyo Doo Ab Jung Se (“Press the Leopards Forehead”)
- Method 12: Cho Chun Se (“Rising Sun”)
- Method 13: Zwa Hyub Soo Doo (“Left Insert Animal Head”)
- Method 14: Hyang Woo Bang Juk Se (“Face Right and Block the Enemy”)
- Method 15: Jun Ki Se (“Spread the Flag”)
- Method 16: Jin Jun Sal Juk Se (“Advance Forward and Kill the Enemy”)
- Method 17: Zwa Yo Kyuk Se (“Left Waist Attack”)
- Method 18: Woo Yo Kyuk Se (“Right Waist Attack”)
- Method 19: Hoo Il Ja Se (“Rear Single Thrust”)
- Method 20: Jang Kyo Boon Soo Se (“Long Dragon Spouts Water”)
- Method 21: Balk Won Chool Dong Se (“White Ape Leaves the Cave")
- Method 22: Woo Chan Kyuk Se (" Right Needle Strike")
- Method 23: Yong Yak Il Ja Se ( " Bravely Skip and Single Thrust")
- Method 24: Hyang Woo Bang Juk Se (“Face Right and Block the Enemy")
- Method 25: Hyang Jun Sal Juk Se (“Face front and kill the enemy")
- Method 26: Shi Woo Sang Jun Se (“Rhinoceros and Ox Face in Battle ”)

There are 8 sword positions and 4 stances from which a swordsman might mount an attack or defense including:

- Jung Dan Se - Middle Guard Position (중 단 세);
- Ûm Se - High Guard Position (음 세);
- Sang Dan Se - Superior Guard Position Offense (상 단 세);
- Pal Dan Se - Superior Guard Position Defense (八相勢);
- Woo Dan Se - Superior Guard Position Right;
- Jwa Dan Se - Superior Guard Position Left;
- Ha Dan Se - Low Guard Position (하 단 세);
- Yang Se - Rear Guard Position (양 세).

There are also a variety of zones and avenues of approach of which the swordsman needs to be aware.

The third method, Jinjun Kyuk Jukse (“Advance Forward to Attack the Thief”), identifies the single most basic sword movement, that of walking forward a given number of steps to execute a single Straight Descending Cut (“Chungmyôn Pegi”). Modern sword practices have compounded this by including all twelve cuts, and three thrusts at this point, so obviating the need for a number of the subsequent methods.

== Modern schools of Korean swordsmanship ==
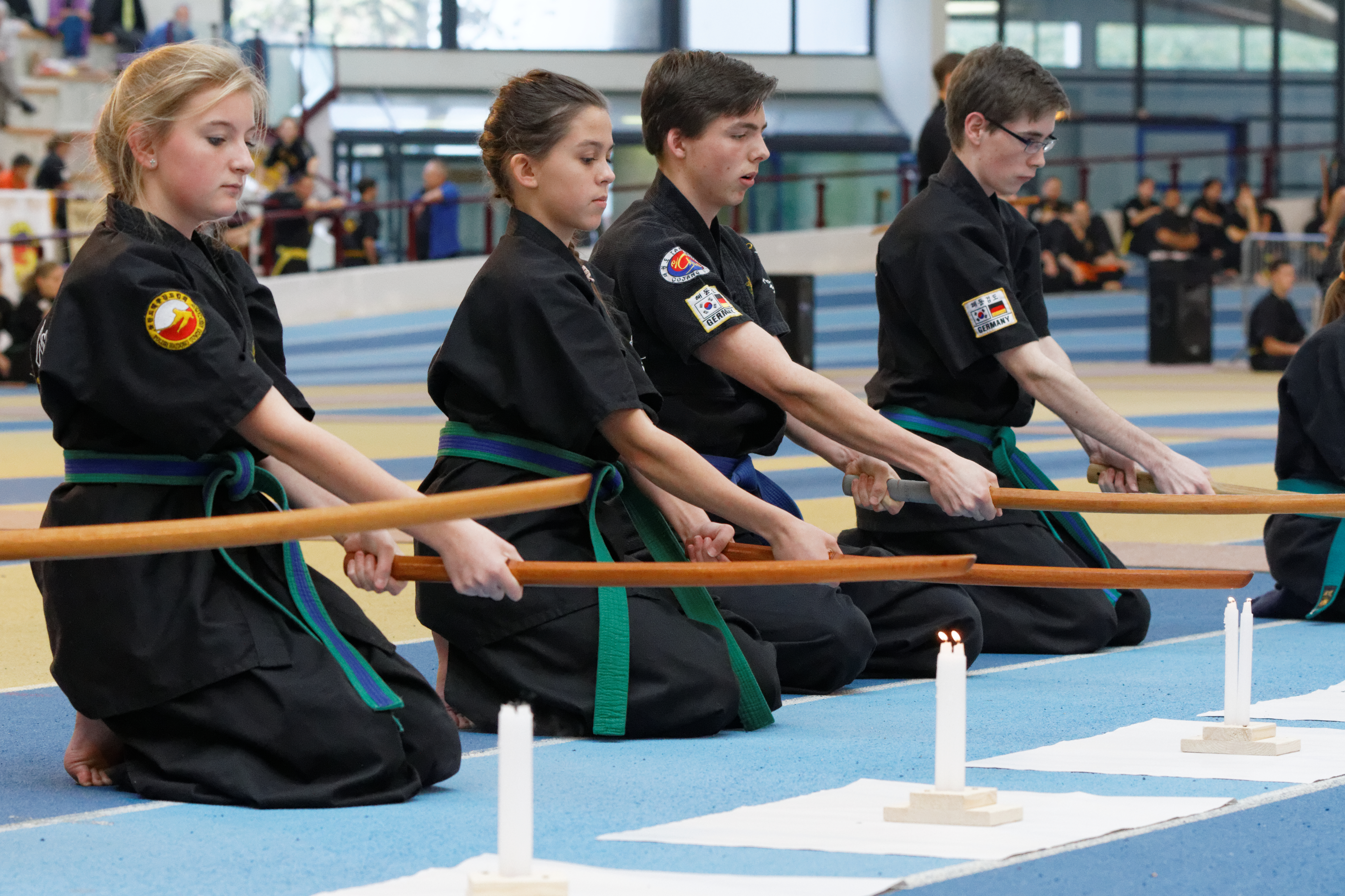
2nd European Haidong Gumdo Championships: candle extinguishing.

Kumdo, the Korean martial art influenced by the Japanese Kendo and Korean martial arts text, Muyedobot'ongji. It was established in 1895.

After the end of Japanese rule in Korea in 1945, there was a patriotic tendency to avoid Japanese martial arts in favour of historical, native traditions, and a number of explicitly "native Korean" styles have become current in South Korea during the 1970s to 1980s.

Shim Gum Do was established in 1971 by Chang Sik Kim in Korea, from 1978 also as the American Buddhist Shim Gum Do Association.

The Sib Pal Gi Association was founded in 1981 based on a system of martial arts taught by Kim Kwang-Seok since 1969, and supposedly directly derived from the techniques of 1790 (including, but not limited to sword disciplines). The Sib Pal Gi Preservation Society (십팔기 보존회) was founded in 2001 by students of Kim Kwang-Seok with the purpose of public performance and the dissemination of public awareness of the Korean martial arts.

Haidong Gumdo, established 1983 as the Hai Dong Gumdo Association, in 1996 was incorporated as the World Hai Dong Gumdo Federation (WHDGF).

Hankumdo, developed by Myung Jae Nam in 1986 and first publicized in 1997, originated as a method of defending against sword attacks, but diverged to include sword techniques in its curriculum.

== See also ==
- Korean sword
- Gummu (Korean sword dance)

== Additional sources ==
- Kim Kwang-sŏk (1995), "The National Sword: Teaching Joseon-era swordsmanship" (Ponʾguk kŏm : Chosŏn kŏmpŏp kyojŏng 本國劍 : 朝鮮劍法敎程), Tongmunsŏn.
- 1963花郞流發刀術十段 創師 南廷補 慶北體育會 創立者«直係者九段 金喆本部長» 大韓劍道 範士 南昇熙
- http://www.호신술.net
- Chong-nyul Pak (박종률), "The origin of our swordsmanship: The true Korean Way of the Sword" (Uri kŏmdo ŭi wŏllyu : haedong kŏmdo ŭi silche 우리검도의원류： 해동검도의실제), Seoul: Hangminsa, 1997.
- Comprehensive Illustrated Manual of Martial Arts; YI Duk-moo1 & PARK Je-ga (1795); Trans: KIM Sang H; Turtle Press, 2000 ISBN 1-880336-53-7
- HWA RANG KUMDO Manual, Korea Hwarang Kumdo Central Assn.; Publ 1996 ISBN 89-7336-648-3
- HAE DONG KUMDO Manual, 1998 ISBN 89-357-0118-1
- SAMGUK YUSA; Ilyon (1206-1289); trans: HA Tae-Hung & Grafton K Mintz; Yonsei Univ Press (7th Ed.) 2004 ISBN 89-7141-017-5
- Comprehensive Illustrated Manual of Martial Arts (Muyedobotongji); trans.: KIM Sang H; Turtle Press 2000; Book 3, Chap 2
- http://www.합기도.com / 金喆總本部道場/國際護身術敎1974
