= Muyesinbo =

Korean martial arts manual published in 1759

- Hangul: 무예신보
- Hanja: 武藝新譜
- Revised Romanization: Muyesinbo
- McCune–Reischauer: Muyesinbo

- Shippalgi
- Hangul: 십팔기
- Hanja: 十八技
- Revised Romanization: Sippalgi
- McCune–Reischauer: Sipp'algi

The Muyesinbo (Korean: 무예신보; lit. 'New Compendium of Martial Arts'; alternatively Muyeshinbo) is a Korean martial arts manual published in 1759. The book is a revision of the older Muyejebo, made during the reign of King Youngjo (1724–1776). It adds twelve disciplines or "skills" of both armed and unarmed fighting by Prince Sado to the original six which were descbribed in the Muyejebo. No copies of the Muyesinbo have survived, but its contents can be determined by tracing back and comparing the Muyejebo with the later Muyedobotongji.

Prince Sado also originated the term Sib Pal Gi (십팔기, 十八技, “Eighteen [Fighting] Methods” or possibly "Eighteen [Warrior's] Tools” if using 十八器), shortened from Bonjo Muye Sib Pal Ban (본조무예십팔반, 本條武藝十八般, "A Treatise on the 18 Martial Categories of the Yi Dynasty"). This mirrors the Chinese concept of the "Eighteen Arms of Wushu" (十八般兵器) to identify the Korean collection of weapons depicted in the Mu Ye Sin Bo (note that 十八般兵器 is pronounced Sip Pal Ban Byeong Gi in Korean, 십팔반병기, where the words Ban Byeong are left out to render Prince Sado's term, and these omitted words roughly translate as "martial methods" making them essentially superfluous when taken in context).

== Historical background ==
The earlier manual of 1610, Muyejebo (Martial Arts Illustrations) had as its background the Imjin War (1592–1598), which revealed severe shortcomings in the Korean national army causing King Seonjo (1567–1608) to order reforms based on the successful training model of the Chinese General Qi Jiguang (1527–1587).

During the reign of King Yeongjo (1724–1776) the Muyejebo was revised, and supplemented with 12 additional fighting methods by Prince Sado, published in 1759. Prince Sado was the heir-apparent of King Yeongjo, but he suffered from a mental illness which triggered violent outbreaks. After the prince took to randomly killing and raping people in the palace, he was executed by suffocation in 1762, aged 27.

Both the Muyejebo and Muyesinbo formed the basis for the later Muyedobotongji ("Comprehensive Illustrated Manual of Martial Arts") of 1795, which added 4 already depicted disciplines only as executed on horseback (namely: flag spear, twin sabres, moon-knife, and flail) in addition to horsemanship itself as well as a polo-like game, bringing the total number of systems to 24.

== The Eighteen Skills ==
These are the eighteen "skills" (技 skill, ability, method) which are classified into three categories (thrust, slice, and strike) and reflect strong influence from Chinese martial arts.

The first six skills already present in the Muyejebo can also be found in the Muyesinbo:

- Gonbong 곤봉 (long staff), cf. Chinese Gun (棍)
- Deungpae 등패 盾牌 (shield)
- Nangseon 낭선 狼筅 (thorn spear)
- Jangchang 장창 長槍 (long spear), cf. Chinese Qiang 槍 / Shuò 槊
- Dangpa 당파鎲杷 (three-pronged spear)
- Ssangsudo 쌍수도 雙手刀(two-handed sword)

The remaining twelve skills are original to the Muyesinbo:

- Jukjangchang 죽장창 竹長槍(long bamboo spear)
- Gichang 기창 旗槍(spear with flag)
- Yedo 예도 銳刀 (sharp sword): a single-edged sword that was about three feet in length. It was typically used one-handed and was favored by foot soldiers and sailors.
- Wae geom 왜검倭刀 :sword

.

- Gyojeon 교전校劍 (sword sparring techniques):
- Woldo 월도 月刀(moon-blade): a polearm with a curving blade paralleling the Chinese guandao.
- Hyeopdo 협도 (spear-blade): a polearm paralleling the Japanese naginata or nagamaki.
- Ssang geom 쌍검 雙劍 (twin-swords): fighting with two identical swords; twin-swords were made to be carried in a single sheath.
- Jedok geom 제독검 將軍劍 (admiral sword): techniques introduced by Chinese admiral Li Rusong, who fought on the Korean side in the Imjin War. Li used straight-bladed swords (jikdo) with a single edge for slashing and a double-edged sword (geom) for stabbing. The manual gives 14 basic stances for this discipline.
- Bonguk geom 본국검 邦國劍(national sword): a method of swordsmanship stressing traditional Korean origin (as opposed to the more recent adoption of the techniques of the "admiral sword").
- Gwonbeop 권법 拳搏(unarmed fighting skills): based on the 1567 Ji Xiao Shin Shu紀效新書 or "Manual of New Military Tactics" by General Qi Jiguang戚継光 (1528–1588). Of the original 32 methods cited by General Qi, about 19 methods are identified in the Muyesinbo, besides another 14 original methods, yielding a total of 33.
- Pyeongon 편곤 鞭杆(flail): paralleling the Chinese two-section staff

The term Sip Pal Gi in modern Korean martial arts has come to identify three separate but related activities.

== Modern reception ==
In modern Korean martial arts, Sip Pal Gi has come to be used generically, much like "kung fu" in the west. There are, however, small groups of practitioners who use the term Sip Pal Gi historically, for the attempted reconstruction of 18th-century Korean martial arts based on the historical manuals, much in the same way as martial arts reconstruction in the West.

== See also ==
- Korean swordsmanship
- Korean martial arts
- The International hosinsool Federation
