= Korean spears =

Weapons

Over time, various types of Korean spears have developed and evolved. The designs are similar to those of spears found elsewhere in Asia and the world, as much due to a process of convergent evolution as to external influence.

== Types of Korean spears ==
- Jangchang: This long spear was usually about 10 ft (3.0 m) in length with a 4 in (100 mm) blade on the end. It was used for throwing or just plowing through the enemy with long reach.
- Jukjangchang: This spear was longer, about 20 ft (6.1 m), and was made of bamboo. It was used for even greater distances than the regular jangchang. Although they weren't always quick, they were used in groups to keep many enemies at a distance. (see also pike)
- Gichang: This type of spear was about 9 ft (2.7 m) long and had a flag near the end to distract enemies. The blade was larger than the jukjangchang.
- Dangpa: The main advantage of the dangpa was that the user could attack someone from a longer distance, was effective against medium swords, a good anti-cavalry weapon, and the ability to strike with heavy damage. The disadvantages were that, like most spears, the dangpa was not as fast as a skilled swordsman, could not be thrown, and was heavier than other spears. (see also Trident)
- Nangseon: This was a multiple-tipped bamboo spear. It was about 25 ft (7.6 m) long and has many other tips and blades branching from it. About half of it consisted of blades and the other half was just the handle of the spear. It was designed to deceive enemies into thinking it was a tree. The blades were steel and often poisoned, so that the slightest cut would mortally wound the opponent.
- Galgorichang: This was a hook spear that was used as an anti-cavalry weapon. It was about 3 yd (2.7 m) long and it had a hook-like blade on the side of it; somewhat like a scythe, but with a shorter blade. (see also Guisarme)
- Topjang: This was a spear that had a blade with a flat top and saw teeth. "Topjang" literally means 'Saw Spear'.
- Neolbjakchang: Literally means 'wide spear'. This spear was called the wide spear because of its wide blade. The cutting edges weren't on the sides, nor was it a stabbing weapon. It was meant to cut with the top portion of the metal. It was rounded on top and sharpened with precision. The blade faced the opponent when being used. (see also Monk's spade)
- Dajichang: This spear had 2-4 heads and was used only for thrusting.
- Sabarichang: This spear had 3 tips but they were in a tripod formation.
- Yangjimochang: This spear had a long blade and with a large sword-guard. It was used to trap swords in their defense.
- Dongyemochang: This spear was the largest spear ever made in Korea. It was about 9 yd (8.2 m) long. It is questioned if there were at least 2-3 people using it at once or if it was used by one great man. The literal translation is 'very long and great spear'.

== See also ==
- Muyedobotongji
- Muyejebo
