= Gyongdang =

The Korean term Gyongdang or Gyeongdang (敬堂 "royal hall") may refer to:

- a portion of the Pungnap earthen ramparts
- pen name of Chang Hŭnghyo (1564-1633)
- Yeon-gyeong-dang, a building of Gyeongbok Palace, built in 1827/8.
- Gyeongdang 24ban Muye, in the "twenty-four methods" or disciplines of Korean martial arts according to the 1795 Muyedobotongji ("Comprehensive Illustrated Manual of Martial Arts").
