= Conscientious objection in South Korea =

While the Republic of Korea's Constitution states that all citizens, regardless of gender, political, or religious affiliation, should be afforded equal treatment under the law, some scholars, such as Intaek Hwang, claim that the culture of militarism is so pervasive that conscientious objectors are stripped of the rights discussed in the Constitution when universal male conscription became the law in 1948. A Conscientious Objector is defined as "an individual who has claimed the right to refuse to perform military service on the grounds of freedom of thought, conscience and or religion" by the United Nations' Human Rights Commission. Since the signing of the Conscription Law in 1949, stating that every male 18 years of age must serve in the military, Conscientious Objectors, when found, are arrested and subject to violent punishments.

Post 1949 there have been at least 400,000 Conscientious Objectors and draft evaders recorded and over 20,000 have been criminalized and subject to brutal treatment. In South Korea, the majority of Conscientious Objectors are part of Jehovah's Witnesses and Seventh Day Adventists. However, in the early 2000s, more men claimed to be a Conscientious Objector for their political ideologies, instead of religious affiliations. While there is not an official list, there have been cases in which Conscientious Objectors have died because of their injuries sustained in prison. One such example is the case of three men, Chong-Sik Kim, Chung-Gil Lee, and Sang-Bok Jeong. Each of these men faced brutal beatings and starvation during their prison sentence, leading to their deaths in 1975 and 1976.

Until the early 2000s the discourse about Conscientious Objectors amongst South Korean media outlets and political parties was scarce. The culture of militarism was pervasive amongst the government and civilians alike as the nation dealt with international wars and conflicts with North Korea. Post 2001, activists groups such as World Without Wars began fighting against the criminalization of Conscientious Objectors. In November 2018, for the first time in South Korean history, the Constitutional Court ruled that the military must provide an alternative service to those who object to violence and released fifty seven imprisoned Conscientious Objectors.

== Timeline ==
- 1945: End of Japanese Colonial Rule
- 1948: Korea is split into the Republic of Korea and the Democratic People's Republic of Korea.
- 1948: The Constitution of the Republic of Korea is formed.
  - Article 19-21 discuss Freedom of Conscience and Religion.
- 1948: Creation of Military Service Act
- 1950–1953: Korean War
- 1963–1979: President Park Chung Hee's term
  - 1971: Park declares state of emergency
- 2009: A Korean Presidential Commission acknowledged deaths of 5 Conscientious Objectors
- 2018: Fifty-seven Conscientious Objectors freed from prison
- 2019: Pardons 1,800+ conscientious objectors
- 2020: Alternative service applications; Military Manpower Administration assesses applications

== Conscientious objectors movement ==
With the end of World War Two and the end of Japanese colonial rule in South Korea, the United States and the Soviet Union split Korea into two nations, the Republic of Korea and the Democratic People's Republic of Korea. In 1948, the Constitution of the Republic of Korea was written and implemented, solidifying the right of freedom of consciousness and religion. However, South Korea had just escaped the traumatic and violent Japanese colonization, creating an atmosphere of anxiety and defensiveness. Therefore, the government decided to create the Military Service Act, which established that all men must join the army to protect and serve the new nation.

When President Park Chung Hee was elected in 1963, he made it his mission to have a 100% conscription rate, meaning that every man beginning at age eighteen until age twenty-two had enlisted and served in the army. In order to establish this, in 1971 President Park declared that South Korea was in a state of emergency, claiming that South Korea was vulnerable to North Korean invasion. President Park created systems to trap Conscientious Objectors, making it seemingly impossible to avoid military service. Park manufactured identification documents that could be checked by any government official at any time. By establishing a comprehensive registry of citizens, Park was able to monitor who had completed their military service and who had not. He also ordered soldiers to raid Jehovah's Witnesses' churches to arrest eligible men who had avoided enlistment. To incentivize military service, President Park created employment opportunities specifically for veterans. While these practical systems proved effective, Park also shaped public perception of Conscientious Objectors by framing military service as a means to combat classism and promote equality. In a society already harboring disdain for draft evasion—fueled in part by the pervasive anxiety over a Northern invasion—Park's portrayal of Conscientious Objectors as opponents of equality and democracy further marginalized and silenced them.

While internationally 80% of criminalized Conscientious Objectors reside in South Korea, the humanitarian issue of criminalizing Conscientious Objectors was not a heavily debated topic amongst the media in South Korea, rendering the debate stagnant whilst men served their sentences until 2001. Some scholars claim that this is because of the media attention growing activist groups gained. World Without War was a particularly influential group of activists as they objected to Korean soldiers aiding the United States in the war in Iraq, adding to a group of individuals who claimed to be a Conscientious Objector based on their political beliefs, rather than because of religious affiliation. Currently, World Without Wars is meeting with other activist groups in the hope to further gain rights and protections for Conscientious Objectors. The introduction of a feminist perspective not only included women in the conversation about conscientious objection but also challenged the militaristic proceedings of other activist groups and counter the hegemonic masculinity constructed and perpetuated by universal male conscription.

== Religious persecution ==
For years, Conscientious Objectors were considered a group of abnormal minority of religious people who chose the doctrine of the Church over the sanctity of the state. This is largely due to the mass arrests of Jehovah's Witnesses for refusing to join the military and the criminalization of Seventh Day Adventists who refused to bear arms. While both Jehovah's Witnesses and Seventh Day Adventists are Christian denominations, their relationship to conscription has differed. Both Jehovah's Witnesses and Seventh Day Adventists were imprisoned and treated inhumanely, however in the 1960s their sentencing was determined by different courts. In the 1960s Jehovah's Witnesses refused to even enlist in the army and were therefore tried in a civilian court whereas Seventh Day Adventists would enlist in the army but refuse to hold guns, and were therefore tried in military courts. With President Park's changes in the 1970s however, both Jehovah's Witnesses and Seventh Day Adventists were tried in military courts, often facing longer and more violent punishments than if they were tried through the civilian courts. Additionally, Seventh Day Adventists and Jehovah's Witnesses had a different relationship with the law and conscription. While the Seventh Day Adventists released a collective statement and appealed to the military and Constitutional Court to petition for legal objection to military service, Jehovah's Witnesses as a collective did not take legal action. Further, Seventh Day Adventists criticized conscription as an act that was against the Church and therefore posed the Church against the State. On the other hand, Jehovah's Witnesses formulated conscientious objection as a matter of individual conscience.

Even before the Constitutional Court's decision of 2018, starting with a court in Seoul in 2004, some local courts had acquitted Jehovah's Witnesses and other religion-based conscientious objectors on the basis of the constitutional principle of religious liberty.

== Criminalization of dissent ==
Feminist scholars and activist groups criticize President Park's means of obtaining a one hundred percent conscription rate, as he created the means to criminalize men who deviated from the hegemonic masculine ideal President Park propagated. Through his fear tactics, President Park painted Conscientious Objectors as possible spies or communists. Further, the propaganda released supporting conscription ensures that being a part of the military is a critical aspect of South Korean men's identity and idea of masculinity that is then legally solidified by the Military Service Act. In the fight against Conscientious Objectors, both the public and the government criminalized deviance from the status quo. The pervasiveness of militarism creates a cause and effect relationship between protecting conscription and arresting Conscientious Objectors.
