= Muyedobot'ongji =

Korean martial arts manual published in 1795

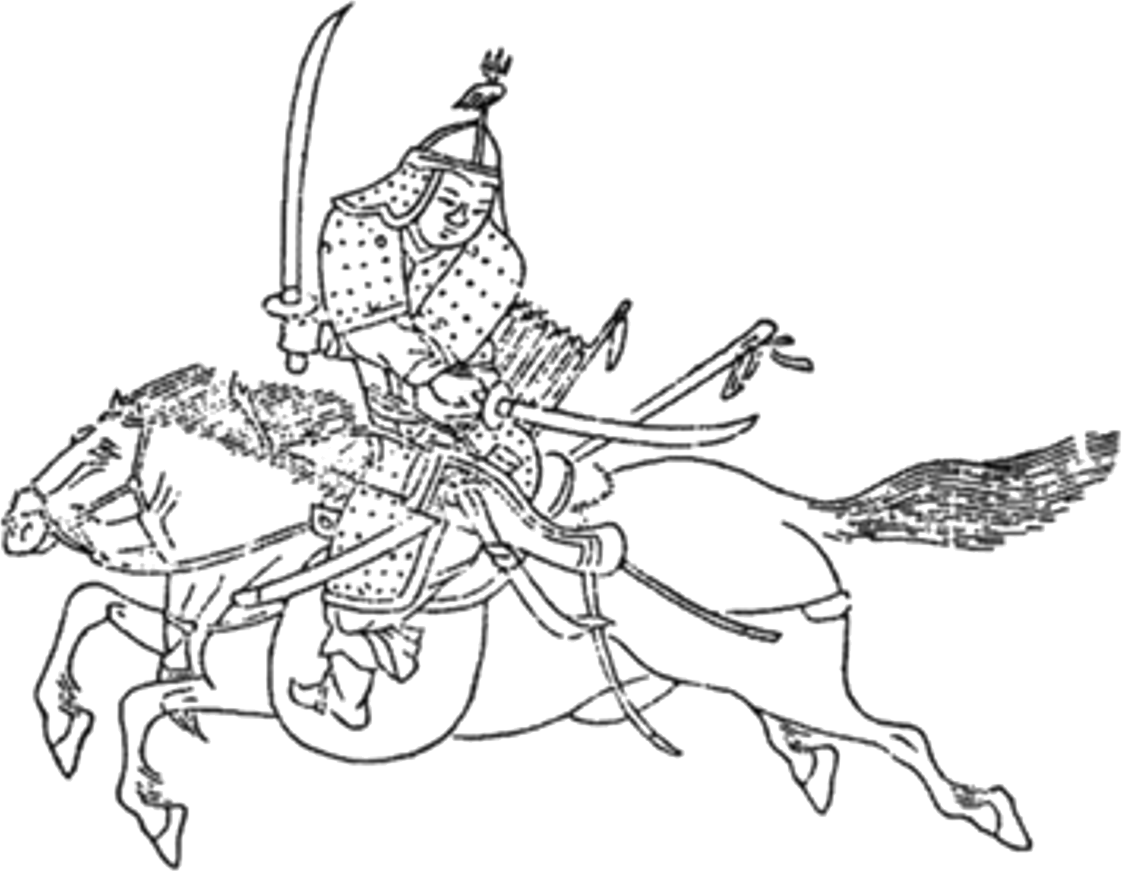

Korean name
- Hangul: 무예도보통지
- Hanja: 武藝圖譜通志
- RR: Muyedobotongji
- MR: Muyedobot'ongji

Muyedobot'ongji (Korean: 무예도보통지; Hanja: 武藝圖譜通志; lit. Comprehensive Illustrated Manual of Martial Arts; Muye Dobo Tong Ji) was a Korean martial arts text written by Yi Tŏngmu, Pak Chega, and Paek Tongsu and published in four volumes in 1795. It was commissioned in 1790 by King Jeongjo (r. 1740–1810). It expanded on the eighteen weapons systems identified in the Muyesinbo of 1758.

It preserved the methods and practices of the earlier work while adding equestrian training. While little more than a field manual for cataloguing required skills, the Muyedobot'ongji is widely regarded as a resource for understanding the nature of Korean military science in the 18th century.

== Background ==
As a result of the high frequency of warfare experienced in Northeast Asia, and in particular the destructive nature of the large number of invasions suffered by the Korean Peninsula, the majority of any documentation of Korean indigenous martial techniques and combat styles has been lost. Much of modern-day scholarship related to the classical or pre-modern Korean martial arts, in particular those that predate the Mongol invasions of Korea (during which Korean palaces and libraries that would have contained many documents germane to the study of martial arts and combat self-defense were destroyed), relies on the study of the Samguk sagi compiled by the scholar Kim Pusik and the Samguk yusa compiled by the Buddhist monk Iryeon. Both works suggest that militant attitudes between and among the three major nations of the Korean Three Kingdoms period (37 BCE – 660 AD) resulted in each nation developing an institution for training its warriors in martial arts and military sciences.

The end of vassaldom to the Mongol Yuan dynasty in the mid-1300s did not bring peace to the Korean Peninsula. The withdrawal/retreat of Mongol hegemony roughly coincided with the collapse of the Kamakura Shogunate in Japan; the resultant instability and the relative lack of control exerted by the subsequent Ashikaga Shogunate led to an increase of incursions by coastal raiding forces, mostly from the Japanese islands. These pirate attacks, as well as raids from the uncontrolled regions in southern Manchuria, provided the Korean state (first as Goryeo and later as Joseon) with some rationale for rebuilding Korean military installations and units. However, as a whole, the ascendance of the Joseon dynasty in Korea in 1392 and the installation of Neo-Confucianism as its guiding philosophy meant that academics, civil pursuits, and cultural arts were overwhelmingly emphasized at the expense of martial arts and military pursuits. As a result, many national and local defense structures, as well as the training and practice of armed combat, was limited and just sufficient to repel small-scale raids and tribal attacks.

The Japanese campaigns in Korea during 1592–8 found a militarily complacent Korea that was woefully unprepared to ward off a major, organized, large-scale military invasion such as the one ordered by Toyotomi Hideyoshi. While elements of the Korean court had attempted to update and otherwise revitalize lackluster Korean military resources, they were frequently opposed by rival factions and therefore unable to make substantive improvements in Korean national defenses on a wide scale until the Japanese invasion demonstrated the need for such an emphasis. In September 1593, after the initial Japanese invasion was stalled and pushed back thanks to Ming Chinese intervention, King Seonjo established a "Royal Military Training Agency." Following the cessation of hostilities and the full retreat of Japanese forces in 1598, the Korean government sought to record all material that they had found useful. As a result, the Muye jebo – 무예제보 (literally “Martial Arts Illustrations”) was published in 1610. The work was compiled by a royal military officer, Han Kyo, and consisted of 6 weapon-based fighting systems. These included the gon bang (long stick), deung pae (shield), nang seon (multi-tipped spear), jang chang (long spear), dang pa (triple-tip spear), and the ssang su do (two-handed saber). Content related to unarmed combat was not included in this manual.

During the reign of King Yeongjo (r. 1724–1776) the Muye jebo was revised and supplemented with 12 additional fighting methods by Crown Prince Sado who originated the term ship pal gi – 십팔기, 十八技 (“Eighteen Fighting Methods”). Though often confused with Chinese practices of the same name and later 20th century practices, the term coined by Prince Sado, a shortened form of bonjo muye ship pal ban – 본조무예십팔반, 文章武藝十八般 ("18 Martial Arts Classes of the Yi Dynasty"), identified this collection of 18 fighting systems. This manual contained the original 6 systems of the muye jebo but also included sections for juk chang 죽창 (long bamboo spear), gi chang 기창 (flag spear), ye do 예도 (short sword), wae geum 왜검 (Japanese sword – presumably this was in reference to the katana), gyo jeon bo 교전보 (illustrations of combat), jedok geum 제독검 (admiral's sword), bon guk geum beop 본국검법 (literally "native sword methods"), ssang geum 쌍검 (literally "twin swords" — this referred to the wielding of two perfectly matched swords in combat, one in each hand), wol do 월도 (literally "moon sword" — this referred to the Korean equivalent of the Japanese naginata, but whose blade was crescent-shaped thus making it more similar to the Chinese guandao), hyeop do 협도 (spear sword — the better-known Japanese counterpart would be a curved yari variant]), pyeon gon 편곤 (flail), and gwon beop 권법 (unarmed combat — note that the hanja 拳法 means "boxing" same as ch. quán-fǎ or jap. kenpō).

The Muyesinbo was revised during the reign of King Jeongjo (r. 1776–1800). The 6 fighting skills that were added were essentially the dismounted methods for such weapons as the spear, sword and flail, which had been described in previous versions for execution from horseback. GwonBeop material was also further modified with the addition of material performed between partners. The material was intended to reflect a combat format in deference to Neo-Confucian thought, by having partners use matched methods which would only produce a "stalemate" rather than a victory of one partner over another. Though ideologically satisfactory, the practice rapidly fell into disuse for its lack of practical combat effectiveness. This revised publication is the Muyedobot'ongji (“Comprehensive Illustrated Manual of Martial Arts”) and was published in 1795.

With the advent of firearms as the predominant method of armed conflict, the methods and techniques in the Muyedobot'ongji largely became relegated to reference material. Many copies were lost or destroyed, along with much knowledge and practice of Korean military science and martial arts, in the latter years of the Joseon dynasty, much of this occurring during the Japanese occupation of Korea in the first half of the 20th century.

== Contents ==
Volumes 1 through 3 focus primarily on polearms and swordsmanship. The fourth volume covers unarmed combat (gwonbeop "boxing"), blunt weapons (staff and flail) and equestrian skills.

Original to the 1795 Muyedobot'ongji are six methods of mounted combat: Gichang (spear fighting on horseback), Masang Ssanggeom (twin swords on horseback), Masang Woldo (crescent sword on horseback), Masang Pyeongon (flail method on horseback), Gyeokgu (ball game on horseback), Masang Jae (horsemanship specialties, such as riding stunts commonly seen in circus acts).

=== Volume 1 ===
1. Long spear or lance – Jang chang (Hangul: 장창, Hanja: 長槍) a 13-foot-long (4.0 m) spear made from the wood of the yew tree. It can also be made from a similarly soft wood, including bamboo in the right climate. It was considered the most effective conventional weapon on the battlefield due to its flexibility and length. The jang chang was widely used in the battle to retake Pyong-yang Fortress during the 1592 war between Chosun (Korea) and Japan.
2. Long bamboo spear – Juk jang chang (죽장창; 竹長槍) 14-foot-long (4.3 m) spear tipped with a 4-inch blade where the shaft was made of bamboo, resulting in more flexibility.
3. Flagspear – Gi chang (기창; 旗槍) A 9-foot-long (2.7 m) staff with a 9-inch-long (230 mm) blade at the end.
4. Trident – Dang pa (당파; 鐺鈀) Trident. The middle spear was longer for deeper penetration. It is between seven feet, six inches and eighteen feet long and has either an iron or wooden tip.
5. Spear on horseback – Gi chang (기창; 騎槍) Use of a spear (typically the Gichang) on horseback.
  Somewhat confusing due to identical sounding words, note that the hanja differ, with the 기창 or flag spear utilizing 旗 (small flag or pennant) which is anchored by the "square" radical (方), while the 기창 or spear on horseback uses 騎 (mounted soldier or cavalry), anchored by the "horse" radical (馬). Although Ma Sang (馬上; literally, "on top of a horse") could have been used as with other mounted weapons in the list, puns are greatly appreciated by Koreans due to many words in their language being pronounced the same.
6. Thorny spear – Nang seon (낭선; 狼先) Spear with nine to eleven branches or thorns extending out from the main shaft, each studded with small metal hooks. These thorns were commonly dipped in poison.

=== Volume 2 ===
1. Long sword – Ssang su do (쌍수도; 雙手刀) Sword that had to be handled with both hands.
  The long sword is wielded using both hands. These frighteningly big, heavy swords were originally called "long swords" (jang do, 장도), or sometimes "applying sword" (yong geom, 용검) or "plain sword" (pyeong geom, 평검). Swords of this type came to be known during invasions of China since they were used by Japanese pirates invading China's coastal areas. Wielding these swords, the Japanese pirates were capable of cutting long spears, or even enemy soldiers, in half with a single stroke. The long sword skills were therefore introduced to Korea in order to prepare its troops for combat against the Japanese pirates.
2. Sharp sword – Ye do (예도; 銳刀) Also known as dan do (?) or hwan do (환도; 環刀). The "hwan" in hwando translates as hoop, loop, or ring, and was also a means of describing chain-mail armor. Since yedo or "sharp sword" was used in addition to hwando, it is safe to assume that this term meant that it could cut through chain-mail, as opposed to referring to a cutlass with rings along the back side of the sword, i.e. opposite the cutting edge (such a sword being the 9 ring broadsword common to Chinese wushu weapons). For clarity, a double-edge sword was called a geom (劍) while a single-edged sword was called a do (刀).
3. Japanese sword – Wae geom (왜검; 倭劍) This chapter describes the use of Japanese swords. Their use was studied during the Imjin Waeran.
4. Combat engagement – Gyo jeon (교전; 交戰) A Japanese method of practicing swordsmanship with a training partner.

=== Volume 3 ===
1. Commander sword – Jedok geom (제독검; 提督劍) Carried around the waist, like the Yedo. This sword can thank its name to commander Li Rusong.
2. Korean sword – Bonguk geom (본국검; 本國劍) Also known as sin geom; 신검 (combining the first syllable from Silla [Sin-Ra; 신라; 新羅], which undergoes assimilation in normal context, and sword [Geom; 검; 劍]). This section represented the swords used by the hwarang from the Silla dynasty. It bore close resemblance to the double edged sword of the Eastern Han
3. Double sword – Ssang geom (쌍검; 雙劍) A set of equally sized swords.
  A fighting skill using two swords, one in each hand. This was one of the most difficult skills to master. Twin swords on horseback required even greater prowess. The fighter could attack and defend at the same time using two swords. The smaller, saber‐size swords with round hand guards (hwando) were generally used for this technique. The swordsman kept a pair of swords, one referred to as male (or yang) and the other one as female (or eum), in a single scabbard to draw them quickly (note that the eum/yang designation also applies to left vs. right). The well-known double swords folk dance (Ssanggeommu) was derived from this skill.
4. Double sword on horseback – Masang ssang geom (마상쌍검; 馬上雙劍) This chapter describes the use of ssang geom from horseback.
5. Halberd – Woldo (월도; 月刀) A weapon, literally "moon knife", which is often compared to a European halberd although it more closely resembles a glaive with a large head.
6. Halberd on horseback – Masang woldo (마상월도; 馬上月刀) This chapter describes how to use the wol do while mounted.
7. Short halberd – Hyeopdo (협도; 挾刀) Shorter version of the wol do.
8. Shield – Deungpae (등패; 藤牌) The use of a shield with a throw sword or throwspear. This chapter counts for two separate methods.

=== Volume 4 ===
1. Unarmed fighting – Gwonbeop (권법; 拳法) This chapter is approximately 20 pages long with no discernible form patterns.
2. Stick – Gon bong (곤봉; 棍棒) This chapter describes how to use the long stick in battle, similar to the Chinese gün (staff)).
  Staff techniques entail strike, stab, block, parry etc. These techniques are fundamentals of all weapon techniques. After mastering staff skills, the study of other pole arms such as spear, sword, trident, moon sword etc. is accessible.
3. Flail – Pyeongon (편곤; 鞭棍) This weapon is made out of a long and short stick connected with a piece of rope or chain. Instead of a steel ball of spikes, the short stick acted as a flail, overfitted with a steel skin that had many painful protrusions.
4. Flail on horseback – Masang pyeon gon (마상편곤; 馬上鞭棍) This chapter described how to use the flail while riding a horse.
5. Korean polo – Gyeok gu (격구; 擊毬) A game that resembles polo.
  Used to upgrade the riding skills of the cavalry, this sport was uniquely played by the Goguryeo cavalry as early as 400 AD. The ball must be scored in a goal, but players must ride, hang or be in whatever position on a horse without touching the ground. Players may only touch the ball with a stick with a tightly bent loop on one end. They can balance the ball on the loop while riding, or throw it (this aspect of play is more similar to the game of lacrosse, albeit mounted, than hitting the ball with a mallet as used in polo).
6. Equestrian skills – Masang jae (마상재; 馬上才) Six equestrian skills that the cavalry should master. This includes taking an upside down posture on the horse, repetitively jumping from one side of the horse to the other, riding under the horse, riding two horses simultaneously, etc. (such skills are commonly referred to as "Trick Riding" nowadays).

== Sources ==
Earlier sources can be traced to Chinese General Qi Jiguang's treatise on troops training, the Ji Xiao Xin Shu (기효신서; 紀效新書, "New Books of Effective Methods"). Ji Xiao Xin Shu was written in 1561. The authors considered that although this type of training had little value for large-scale battle, it was nevertheless useful to train bodily flexibility, reflexes, hands speed, quick yet solid footwork, and jumping capacity, all of which were very valuable for a warrior.

== Improvements ==
As a manual, the Muyedobot'ongji made several improvements over its Chinese sources since many practical comments on training and the value of the described techniques were added, and shows the influence of the neighboring Chinese martial traditions on the Korean peninsula.

The book divides the techniques into stabbing, cutting, and striking techniques, while earlier books divided them into long and short weapon skills. The old classification method had to be abandoned with the development of firearms. The long spear had lost its function as a long-range weapon by the time the book was written. Quite clearly, first bow and arrow, and later the advent of firearms, rendered the long spear obsolete in this role.

== See also ==
- Sib Pal Gi Association
- Korean martial arts
- Korean sword
