= Simgumdo =

Korean martial art

Shim Gum Do
- Focus: Weaponry
- Hardness: Non-competitive
- Country of origin: Korea
- Creator: Chang Sik Kim
- Olympic sport: No
- Official website: shimgumdo.org

- Simgumdo
- Hangul: 심검도
- Hanja: 心劍道
- RR: Simgeomdo
- MR: Simgŏmdo

Shim Gum Do, translated as the "mind sword path", is a Korean Martial Art and style of Korean Swordsmanship of recent invention, originating in Korea.

== History ==
Shim Gum Do emerged from the enlightenment of Chang Sik Kim, during a 100-day meditation and prayer retreat at Hwagyesa temple in Seoul, South Korea, in 1965. In 1971, Chang Sik Kim established the Korean Shim Gum Do Association and began teaching Shim Gum Do in South Korea. He moved to the United States in 1974, and, in 1978 he established American Buddhist Shim Gum Do Association.

The main temple, Shim Gwang Sa, was built in Boston, Massachusetts. The World Shim Gum Do Association was established there as the world's center of Shim Gum Do Associations. The central component of the system is a series of 330 forms (choreographed sequences of techniques) using the sword. The system also includes forms using two swords, a long staff, a short staff, and empty hands, as well as a series of 3000 self-defense techniques called Ho Shin Sul.

Shim Gum Do schools have existed in Italy, Japan, Poland, France, and Norway. The headquarters of the World Shim Gum Do Association as well as the American Buddhist Shim Gum Do Association is Shim Gwang Sa temple located in Brighton, Massachusetts.

== Training ==
From the time of Kim’s enlightenment, training in Shim Gum Do sword techniques has focused on the use of a wooden practice sword, commonly called a mokgum in Korean. After achieving the rank of black belt, Shim Gum Do sword students may use a Korean style steel sword, which has a single-edged blade and is closely related to the Chinese Tang dynasty single-edge swords or the Japanese katana.

Shim Gum Do sword training is organized as a progression of several series of forms. New students learn a series of basic forms and then move onto beginning defense forms before attaining their yellow belt. After learning 15 of these forms, a student may test for a first dan (degree) black belt. Progression may continue through the beginning attack series and on through 14 different series of sword forms. In addition to sword forms, students may learn up to 330 empty-handed forms called Shin Boep ("body dharma"). Advanced students may study Ssang Gum Boep ("two-sword dharma"), Dan Bong Sul ("short staff art"), or Jang Bong Sul ("long staff art"), consisting of 50 forms each.

== Philosophy ==
Although the physical techniques of Shim Gum Do are intended by Chang Sik Kim to be effective fighting techniques, Chang Sik Kim teaches that the foundation of a clear mind and harmony between mind and body’s action is the most important thing a person can learn for defense. He argues that this ideal makes Shim Gum Do a non-violent martial art. In fact, spiritual aspects are highly emphasized in this martial art. It is typically practiced in spaces set up as Buddhist sanctuaries, and students have frequent opportunities for sitting in meditation and receiving dharma instruction.
