= Korean sword =

Swords produced in Korea

The traditions of Korean bladesmithing and swordsmanship have served a central place in the military history of Korea for thousands of years. Although typical Korean land battles have taken place in wide valleys and narrow mountain passes, which favor use of spears and bows, the sword found use as a secondary, close-quarters weapon, in addition to far more prominent role during sieges and ship-to-ship boarding actions. Higher quality, ceremonial swords were typically reserved for the officer corps as a symbol of authority to command the troops. Ceremonial swords are still granted to military officials by the civilian authority to this day.

Korean swords typically fall into two broad categories, the geom, and the do. The Geom is a double-edged weapon, while the Do is a single-edged weapon; although exceptions exist. In common parlance, all swords may be referred to as geom (검; 劍).

The history of the sword in Korea begins with bronze daggers of Bronze Age of which existing artifacts dates back to 10-9th century BCE. Iron use co-existed with Bronze use during the late Bronze Age.

The rarity of traditional Korean swords in the modern day has made them extremely valuable, with high demand from both museums and collectors.

== History ==
=== Early swords ===
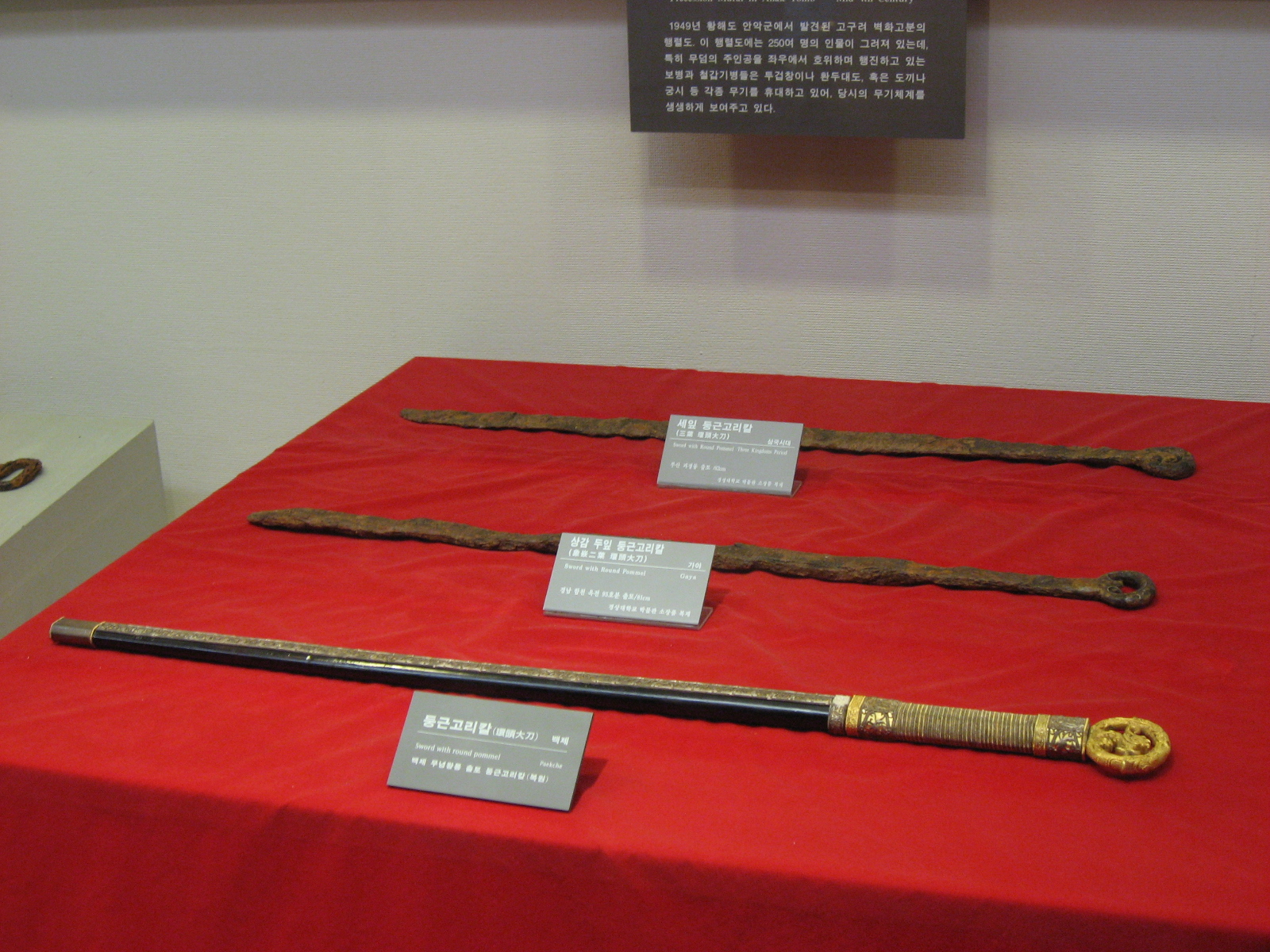
Three Kingdoms era swords generally have a ring pommel. More elaborate swords hold images of dragons or phoenixes in the ring.

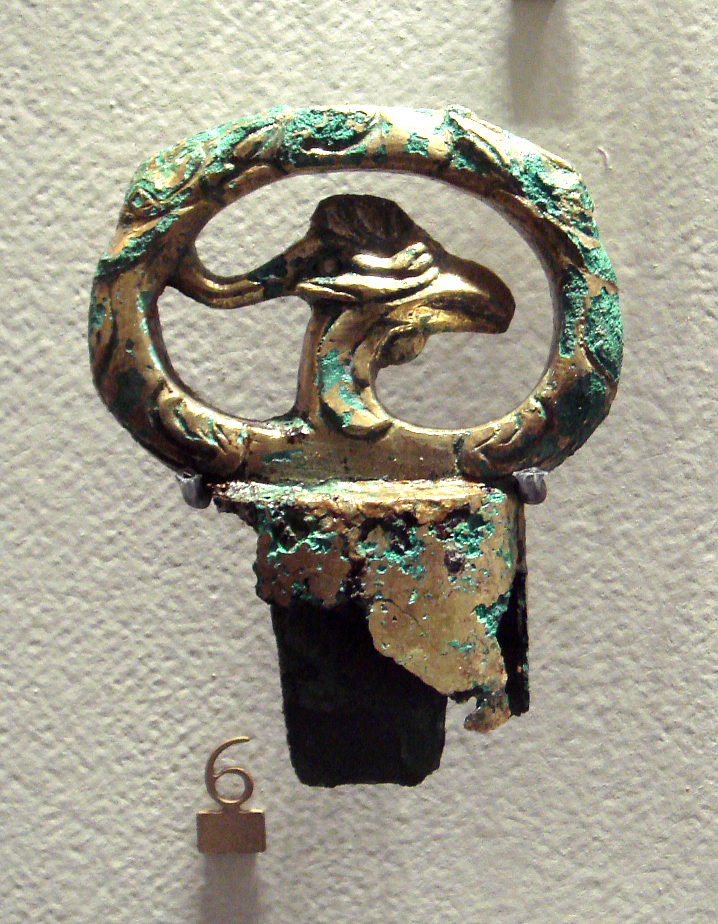
Silla era sword pommel

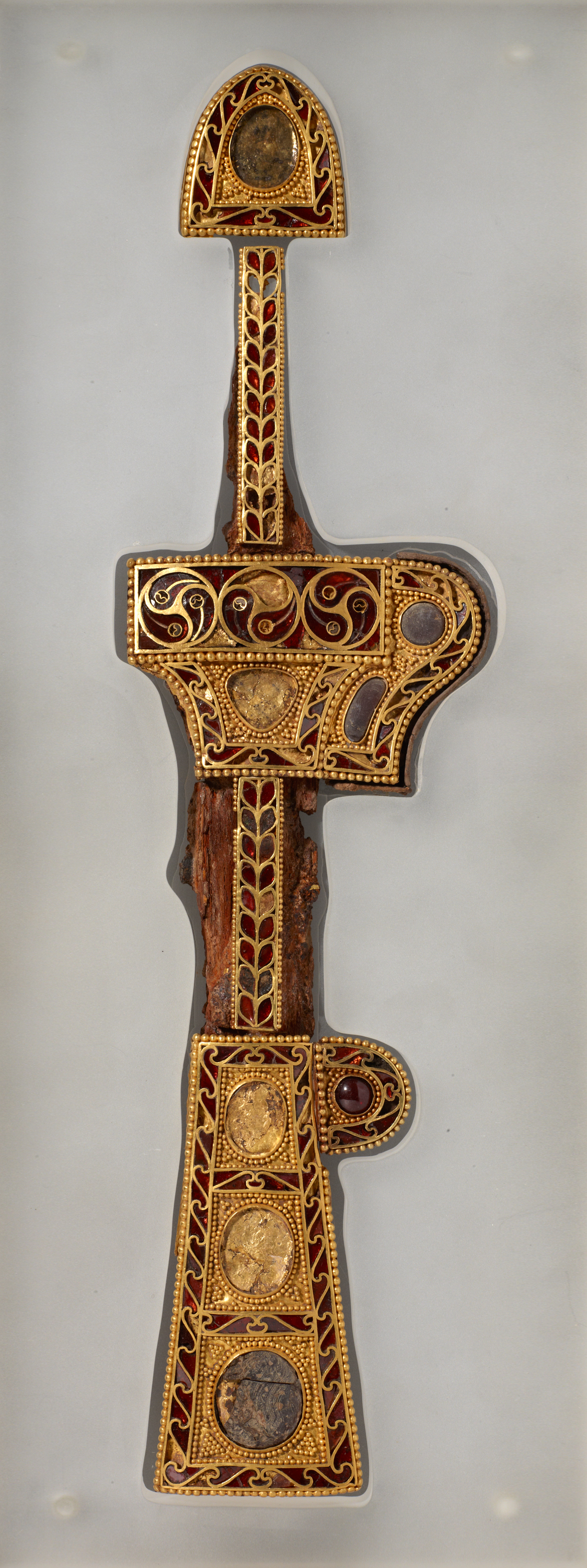
Ornamented sword made during the Silla period

Evidence of sword production dates to the transitional Late Bronze to Early Iron Age (c. 1st century BC), with an earthenware mold for a Bronze Sword found in South Gyeongsang Province.

The earliest Korean sword type is the so-called Hwandudaedo or "ring-pommel sword," prevalent during the 1st to 6th centuries. Until the 3rd century, these swords were very rare and presumably reserved for royalty. They became more attainable in the later 4th and during the 5th century, and are found in many higher class tombs of this period. Their production declined in the 6th century.

By the last third of the Three Kingdoms period (i.e. 450 AD and beyond), steel making techniques had come from China (possibly during the Northern and Southern dynasties period in China) and were also employed in Korean swordmaking by all three Korean kingdoms (Goguryeo, Baekje, and Silla). In 2013, a Chinese Character inscription was discovered on a 5th-century sword from the Geumgwanchong tomb in Gyeongju, North Gyeongsang Province. The scabbard of the sword has the inscription 尒斯智王 Yisaji-wang ("King Isaji").

Long swords during the Korean Three Kingdoms Period were used primarily by cavalry and commanders (who were also usually mounted), not infantry. At this time, land warfare consisted mostly of spearmen and bowmen on foot, mounted archers on horseback using two-handed bows, and mounted swordsmen with twin blades. Swords were not a primary weapon for all combat but were instead used mostly for shock attacks, defensive strokes, and for close-in fighting. Blades were heavy as they were made mostly of bronze and later iron, and pommels were often knobbed and used as balances or for very close-in work. Short swords may have been used in follow-up attacks, as short sword carriers were heavily armored.

During the Goryeo dynasty, a limited number of Korean swords were exported for trade missions in Asia. It is likely that Korean swordmaking was influenced by Mongol and Chinese weapon manufacture after Goryeo's submission as a Mongol vassal after 6 Mongol invasions ending in 1259.

== Joseon Period (Hwando) ==
=== History ===
The sword used for combat during the Joseon Dynasty was called Hwando (Korean: 환도), and in the name 'Hwando (環刀)', 'Hwan(環)' is the Hanja meaning ring. There are differing opinions about the origin of the name. 《Yungwon Pilbi》 (융원필비, 戎垣必備), a military book published in 1813 states that it originated from a ring for tying the sheath to the waist.

Hwando appeared in the late Goryeo dynasty, the prior dynasty of the Joseon dynasty. The name 'Hwando (環刀)' appears first in 《Goryeosa》. It is written that when an envoy from the Yuan Dynasty arrived in April 1277, King Chungnyeol sent Yi Jang-mu (이장무, 李藏茂) to Chungju city to make 1,000 sacks of Hwando.

=== Carrying ===
There were many ways to wear the Hwando, including using a belt called Tti-don (띠돈 메기), wearing it on the back (둘러메기), around the shoulder (뒤꽂이), and around the waist by tying a string to the ring of the scabbard (고리 메기). During the Joseon Dynasty, swords were often worn with the hilt pointing toward the back.

This method is mainly seen in countries that used cavalry as its main force. It is said that this method was designed because if the sword was worn with the hilt facing forward, the sheath at the back would hit the horse and hinder its movement when running fast on horseback. It also has the advantage of being more comfortable when shooting a bow because the hilt does not get in the way. This type of sword-wearing is a fairly common style of sword-wearing that appears in Mongolia, the Ming dynasty, the Qing dynasty.

=== Anatomy ===
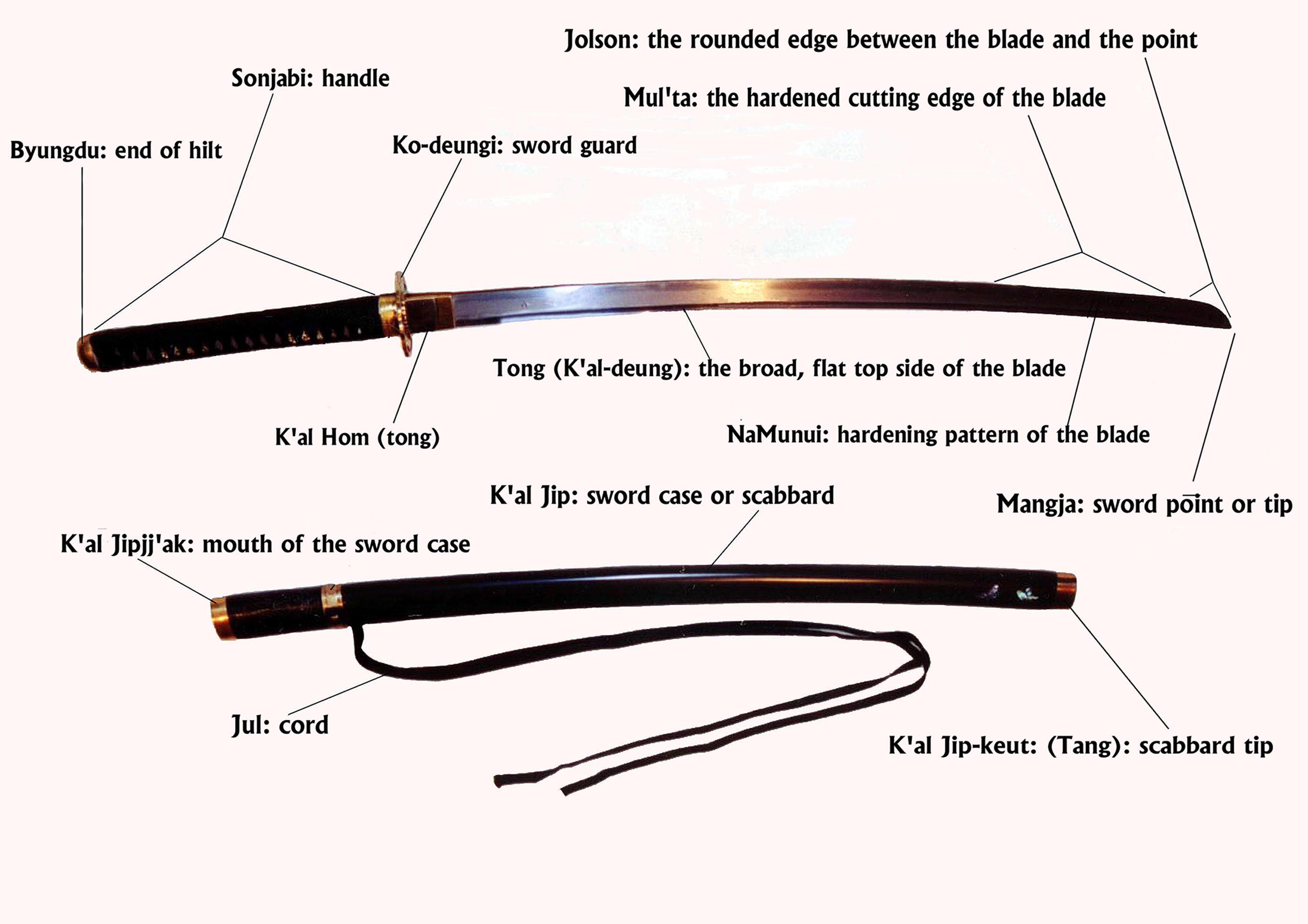
Korean sword nomenclature

The method in which the sword hilt faces backwards is mainly seen in attire using Tti-don, which makes it easy to turn the hilt, but it is difficult to know exactly when Tti-don was used in Korea. However, during the Yuan Intervention period, the mainstream in Mongolia was to kick the sword with the hilt facing forward. Also, in the Hwando paintings from the early Joseon Dynasty depicted in 《Sejong Silok》(世宗實錄) and the 《Gukjo-oyreui》(國朝五禮儀), there is only a ring for the scabbard and no bandon is depicted, and even in the royal tombs of the mid-Joseon Dynasty in the 16th and 17th centuries, figures wearing sword sheaths with rings are carved. Considering this, it appears that it was common until the mid-Joseon Dynasty to wear the sword with the hilt facing forward in a looped manner. The oldest Hwando where Tti-don is found is Yu Sŏngnyong's Hwando. Considering this, it is highly likely that the Tti-don and the method of kicking the sword with the hilt facing backwards were introduced starting around the mid-Joseon Dynasty under the influence of the Ming Dynasty or the Jurchen people.

The Hwando of the early Joseon Dynasty, as recorded in the 《Sejong Silok》(世宗實錄) and the 《Gukjo-oyreui》(國朝五禮儀), is not only greatly curved but also short in length. Looking at the blade length regulations for the Hwando recorded in 《Munjong Silok》(文宗實錄), it is 1.7 ja for infantry use and 1.6 ja for cavalry use, and the length of the handle is 2 gwon for infantry use and 1 gwon 3 ji for cavalry use.

The overall shape of the blade is a curved, single-edged sword. Due to partial heat treatment, there were faint patterns on the blade. The curvature varied, with some swords having a pronounced curve and others being almost straight. Generally, it resembles a Japanese Katana, but unlike the Katana, there is often no distinct boundary line (yokote) at the tip of the blade, making the tip relatively ambiguous.

Regarding cross-sections, there were triangular, single-plane pentagonal, pentagonal, and hexagonal types depending on the shape. However, due to durability issues, triangular swords were used for personal protection or assassination, like the changpogeom (창포검), while the military typically used Hwandos with hexagonal or pentagonal cross-sections. There are very few single-plane pentagonal artifacts, and little is known about their advantages and disadvantages.

There is a record that when Koreans obtained a Japanese sword, they would grind down the back and side slopes (shinogi) to make the sides flat and the edge angular. That shows the differences between Japanese sword and Hwando. However, most surviving Hwandos have clear angular ridges on the blade back, similar to the shinogi of a Japanese sword. The cross-sections of the hwandos unearthed from Dongnae Citadel were also pentagonal and hexagonal, and even swords from the Goryeo period excavated from Cheoin Fortress had angular blade backs.

Also there is a record that Japanese swords as having softer steel on the left and harder steel on the right, with the left side of the blade ground obliquely, indicating a single-plane structure. However, typical Japanese swords do not have steel joined on both sides, and although there were single-plane types in Japan, they were not mainstream.

=== Locking system ===
The lock can be pulled out as one of the characteristic styles of Hwando. Unlike swords from other cultures, the sword had a separate locking device, and there was very little chance that the sword would come out on its own even during vigorous activity. In the early Joseon Dynasty, a locking device called a Binyeojang (비녀장) was mainly used. 'Binyeo (비녀)' of Binyeojang literally means Binyeo, the traditional Korean hairpin.

This was to prevent the sword from falling out of the scabbard, and the hole on the back of the shield was to secure the sword with a Binyeojang. Of course, it was not without its drawbacks. Additional processes were required for production, and of course there was a possibility of damage. And in fact, as it is not like there are no hobbyists in Hwando who can perform the minimal locking role, it is actually rather common for Hwando to also not have a locking device. It can be seen that the locking device was just one of the many styles of Hwando.

== Japanese sword in Korea ==
=== History ===
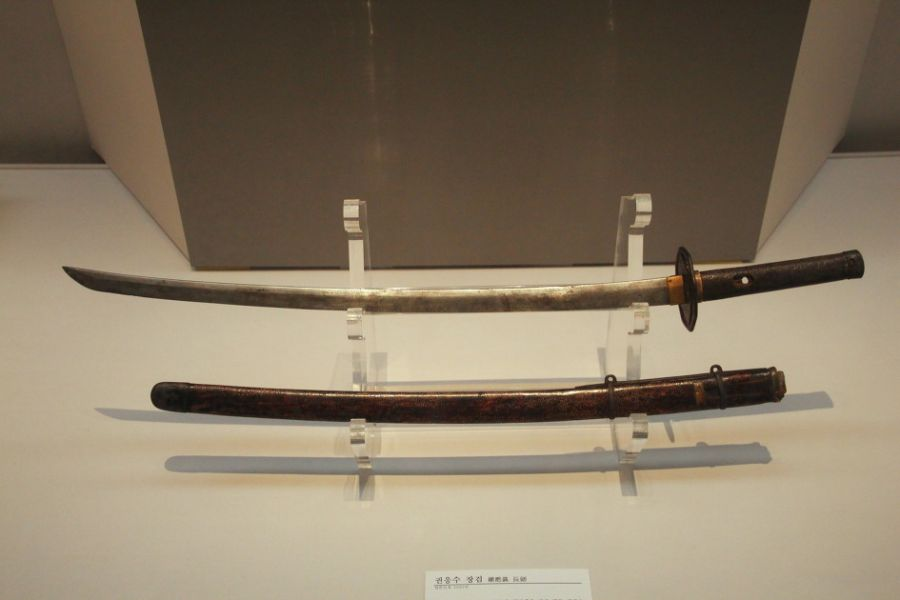
An Uchigatana made by Bizen Osafune. General Kwon Eung-su (권응수, 1546-1608), killed Japanese General Kihachi (喜八) and took it for use during the Imjin War. Its sheath and hilt have been modified to Hwando's style. It is currently on display in Jinju National Museum.

During the Imjin War (1592-1598), the Joseon Army confiscated Japanese swords. However, the Japanese sword introduced during this period was not the origin of the Hwando. The Hwando and the Japanese Sword are similar in appearance, but in the Joseon dynasty, there was a clear distinction between the Hwando and the Japanese sword.

According to historical relics, the Hwando and Japanese sword evolved independently since Goryeo dynasty and took on similar shapes with Katana before the Imjin War. This can be described as convergent evolution, and historical documents show that the Hwando was influenced by the Central Asian Sabre that came through the Yuan dynasty to the Goryeo dynasty rather than the influence of the Japanese sword. Although it is not recorded in the documents, some historians speculate that Joseon craftsmen making Hwando may have adopted some of the styles of Japanese swords through the Imjin War.

== Typology ==
=== Introduction ===
Geom (검; 劍) is the Korean word for "sword;" it is typically used of double-edged swords, but is also applied to single-edged swords. Yedo (예도; 銳刀) is the specific term for a single-edged sword.

Elements of the Korean sword include: geomjip or scabbard, most often of lacquer; hyuljo or fuller (most genuine Korean swords didn't have a fuller); hwando magi or collar; ho in or collar; kodeungi or hand guard; a ring-design pommel; tassels; a round and wide designed sword guard, or a straight lotus design.

=== Various examples of Korean sword design ===
Many different types of Do and Geom exist, ranging from very simple forms found in many nations to unique and artistic designs found solely in Korea.

- Jikdo, literally "straight sword."
- Janggeom (Korean: 장검; Hanja: 長劍): literally "long sword."
- Jingum, literally "true sword." Typically used to signify a blade that is meant for combat, rather than for ceremonial or spiritual purposes.
- Changpogeom, a sword named after the calamus plant (changpo in Korean). The sword is designed to reflect the design of the plant, with a double sided blade tapering to a narrow tip.
- Hwandudaedo (Korean: 환두대도; Hanja: 環頭大刀) or "ring-pommel sword) is a type of single-edged sword used during the Three Kingdoms era.
- Geom is the generic term for "sword," but more specifically also refers to a shorter straight-blade, double-edged sword with a somewhat blunted tip which distinguishes this weapon from its Chinese counterpart, the jian. As a badge of status rather than a weapon, the Geom was often heavily decorated both on its scabbard and grip as well as with engravings and inscriptions on its blade.
- Do, commonly referred to as a Hwando or "military sword," was a single-edged sword, used as a sidearm for the Korean soldier well into the 19th century. Sometimes referred to as a "short sword," relative to the larger sized two-handed Sangsoodo, its length of 24 to 34 in (61 to 86 cm) was comparable to that of the two-handed Japanese Katana which may have been the inspiration for the Ssangsoodo. Reports found in the "Book of Corrections," a Korean record of the Imjin Warum (1592–1598), state that Japanese swords taken in combat were readily pressed into service by simply trimming the length of the hilt. Forged of carbon steel the Do has a single-edged, curved blade, a sword guard, and a grip typically of wood. Earlier practice saw the Do suspended from a cord (Jul) and with a simple metal hanger which allowed the soldier to speedily discard his sheath. In later practice, the sword was suspended from a girdle or belt but retained a simple metal quick-release clip.
- The Ssangsudo (Korean: 쌍수도; Hanja: 雙手刀) is a double-handed single-edged sword used for a limited time in the late 16th and early 17th centuries. Chinese literature and history both ascribe its adoption as a weapon on the Asian mainland to General Qi Jiguang (1528–1588) who is said to have taken Wokou pirate prisoners during his campaigns in Southern China. Qi Jiguang wrote about the sword in his manual the Record of Military Training or Lianbing Shi Ji (練兵實紀) and recommended its use as part of the defense along China's northern border. Since General Qi's other famous training manual, the Jixiao Xinshu (紀效新書), was used in the revamping of the Korean Military it followed that this weapon came highly recommended. Nor did the Koreans overlook that oversized swords had been used by Japanese soldiers during the recent conflict as well as during their own experiences with the Wakou. Intended by General Qi to be carried into combat on wagons or by individuals who drew each other's weapon, the Ssangsoodo measured an overall length of 6 ft (180 cm), 2 ft (61 cm) of which were to be the grip and another 2 ft (61 cm) forward of the handle to be sheathed in brass or copper. Undoubtedly the length and weight of the sword, and the high level of training necessary to wield it, made the sword impractical as a common part of the Korean arsenal. It is also useful to note that the Ming dynasty, which saw this weapon added to its own military, fell to Manchu invaders some 50 years later.
- The Hyup Do or "spear sword" is found in Book Three, Chapter seven. Though commonly taken for a polearm after the fashion of the Japanese Naginata, the text of the Muyedobotongji relates that "the handle is about 4 ft (120 cm)....weighs about 4 lb (1.8 kg).....the illustration in this book is corrected according to the Mubiji and the Japanese Jang Do. They are the same." It is reasonable to conclude that the Hyup Do was much closer to the Japanese Nagamaki.

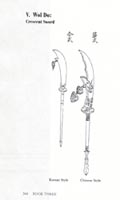
Korean Wol-Do (L) displayed with its Chinese equivalent (R).

- The *Woldo (Korean: 월도; Hanja: 月刀) was a bladed polearm, like its Chinese counterpart the Yaoyindao commonly decorated with a tassel or feather affixed to a prominence on the spine of the blade which assisted the person wielding the weapon with identifying the blade's center of mass. According to the Muyedobotongji, "the length of the handle is 6.4 ft (200 cm); the length of the blade is 2.8 ft (85 cm). The weight is about 3.15 lb (1.43 kg)."
- Ssangdo or Ssanggeom (Korean: 쌍도; Hanja: 雙刀; Korean: 쌍검; Hanja: 雙劍) This literally means "Twin Swords." It can vary from twin long swords or twin short swords. These techniques can also be used on horseback as 'Masang ssanggeom.' The Korean cavalry was famous for using Twin Sword techniques on horseback, while balancing on the horse with grace. Ssangyunggeom are twin swords which are carried in a single scabbard. The sheath is twice as wide because it needs room for the second sword. The sword's length varies from 3 to 4 ft (91 to 122 cm). Usually these swords were double-edged and made entirely of Iron (including the scabbard).
- Hyeopdo (Korean: 협도; Hanja: 俠刀) This is also a large crescent blade that is similar to the 'Pudao' but wider and thicker. A tassel is attached to the end of the blade.
- Hwando (Korean: 환도): This is a single-edged short sword which was strictly used with one hand. This was a common sidearm for many soldiers during the Joseon era.
- Unggeom (Korean: 웅검): This is a single-edged long sword that was used with one or two hands. This was another common side arm for many soldiers during the Joseon era.
- Samgakdo (Korean: 삼각도; Hanja: 三角刀): The samgakdo is a recently used terminology for swords used for mat cutting. The cross section of the sword is triangular in shape; hence the name Samgakdo (which means three-sided sword).
- For martial arts students learning sword forms or Geombeop/Geomsul, practice wood swords or mokgeom are most often used; then those made out of carbonized bamboo or Juk-do; lastly compression sponge, single or double-edged, with or without blood grooves. Modern sword and knife sparring commonly makes use of plastic blades.
- Chilseonggeom (Korean: 칠성검; Hanja: 七星劍): The name of this sword translates as "seven star sword" and it could be either single-edged or double-edged. It is primarily known for its use by Buddhist practitioners. Almost all of these swords had constellation engravings on the blades (usually the Big Dipper, although depiction of any 7 star cluster isn't uncommon).
- Sainchamsageom: This sword's name literally means 'Great Four Tiger Sword.' This is a ceremonial sword that is used for demon slaying and Shamanistic rituals. The ingeom (Tiger Swords) were usually of the same designs but of different strengths. They were all made according to the Year, Month, Day, and Hour of the Tiger. Other examples include the sam-ingeom or 'Three Tiger Sword,' and the i-ingeom or 'Two Tiger Sword.'
- Samjeongdo (Korean: 삼정도; Hanja: 三精刀) the sword given to newly promoted Korean military generals each year by the Ministry of National Defense.
- The Seven-Branched Sword is a peculiar specimen forged in Baekje in the order of the king. There is a theory that this is a sword that was to be a gift presented to the Emperor of Japan. There was no handle found for the blade nor was there a scabbard found for it while it was being excavated.

== Korean swordsmanship ==
The study of Korean sword as a weapons system is commonly called Geom Beop (literally "Sword Law")

During the Joseon period, swords also had ranks depending on who wielded them and what their purpose was. The highest ranking of these swords was known as the Byeol-ungeom (Korean: 별운검; Hanja: 別雲劍), literally meaning "cloud-splitting sword." Only two such swords existed and were wielded by the King's two bodyguards, who always stood on either side of him and held the nobility title of Un'geom (Korean: 운검; Hanja: 雲劍).

Master swordsmen:

- General Kim Yu-sin, was said to have been given an engraved sword and sacred books by the gods, and helped to unify Korea under Silla. His most famous son, Kim Wonsul, was a noted swordsman who fought against the Tang dynasty armies in the late Three Kingdoms period.
- Ch'ŏk Chun-gyŏng was a civil official and swordsman of Goryeo who became famous for his feats in the Jurchen Invasion of 1104.
- Baek Dong Soo was a swordsman and martial artist who became a folk hero when his group protected King Jeongjo from assassination attempts. His most notable work, Muyedobotongji (illustrated manual of Korean martial arts).

== Contemporary swords ==
Only by the mid-1990s did Korean swordmaking come back to expert levels comparable to the Joseon era. Haedong jingeom (해동진검; 海東陣劍) This literally means 'East Asian Practical Sword' is the neologistic term for current-day swords for "revivals" of Korean swordsmanship.

Sword ownership in Korea is currently restricted (private weapons ownership was culturally frowned upon and largely restricted during other times in Korean history, particularly during the Joseon era and the Japanese occupation period - albeit for different reasons in either period), and there are very few traditional sword collectors in Korea today. General/flag-grade officers are given dress swords upon assuming command in the South Korean army. Despite restrictions on sword ownership and a lingering social preference against armed martial arts (dating at least to the Joseon era), practical sword fighting is enjoying a small revival amongst elite military regiments, and fencing is once again attracting interest in Korean universities.

=== Sword producers ===
- Hong Seok-hyeon in Paju, Gyeonggi province, makes swords by hand.
- Lee Sang Seon in Munkyong City, Kyongsangbukdo Province
- Lee Eun-cheul in Yeoju, Kyonggi Province
- Kang Cheul Kyu in Pocheon, Kyongki Province 전통한얼도검 제작소

== Authentic reproductions ==
In 2006, swords bestowed on newly promoted brigadier generals were changed from the single-edged curved samjeongdo, which was considered to be a traditional Korean sword, to the double-edged straight samjeong-geom claiming that the samjeongdo is similar to the "Western sword" and not reflecting the traditional Korean sword. Samjeongdo had been given to brigadier generals since 1983.

In November 2015, the Statue of Admiral Yi Sun-Shin erected in Parliament was replaced with a newly created authentic statue. The sword of the statue was longer than the traditional Korean sword and more resembled the Japanese sword.

== See also ==
- Chiljido
- Chinese sword
- Hwandudaedo
- Indian sword
- Japanese sword
- Korean knife
- Korean spears
- Korean swordsmanship
- Kumdo
