= Pyeongon =

Weapons used by the Joseon army

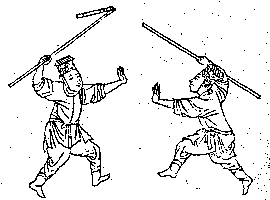

Korean name
- Hangul: 편곤
- Hanja: 鞭棍
- RR: pyeongon
- MR: p'yŏn'gon

The Pyeongon is a nunchaku/Flail-like weapon used by the Joseon army and is first mentioned in a martial arts manual called Muyesinbo. The weapon was inspired by the farmer's flail to thresh rice with. In the West it mostly known as a two-section staff.

The Pyeongon consists of a large pole (187 cm (74 in)) with a shorter stick (47 cm (19 in)) attached to it by a metal chain, but sometimes rope was used. The short stick could be covered with spikes.

== Techniques ==
The Pyeongon is one of the weapons in the Muyedobotongji that has special techniques for use on horseback as well. This was called Masang Pyeongon (마상편곤, 馬上鞭棍). For foot soldiers techniques are given against the long staff (gonbang; 棍棒).

== See also ==
- List of martial arts weapons
