= Woldo =

Type of polearm

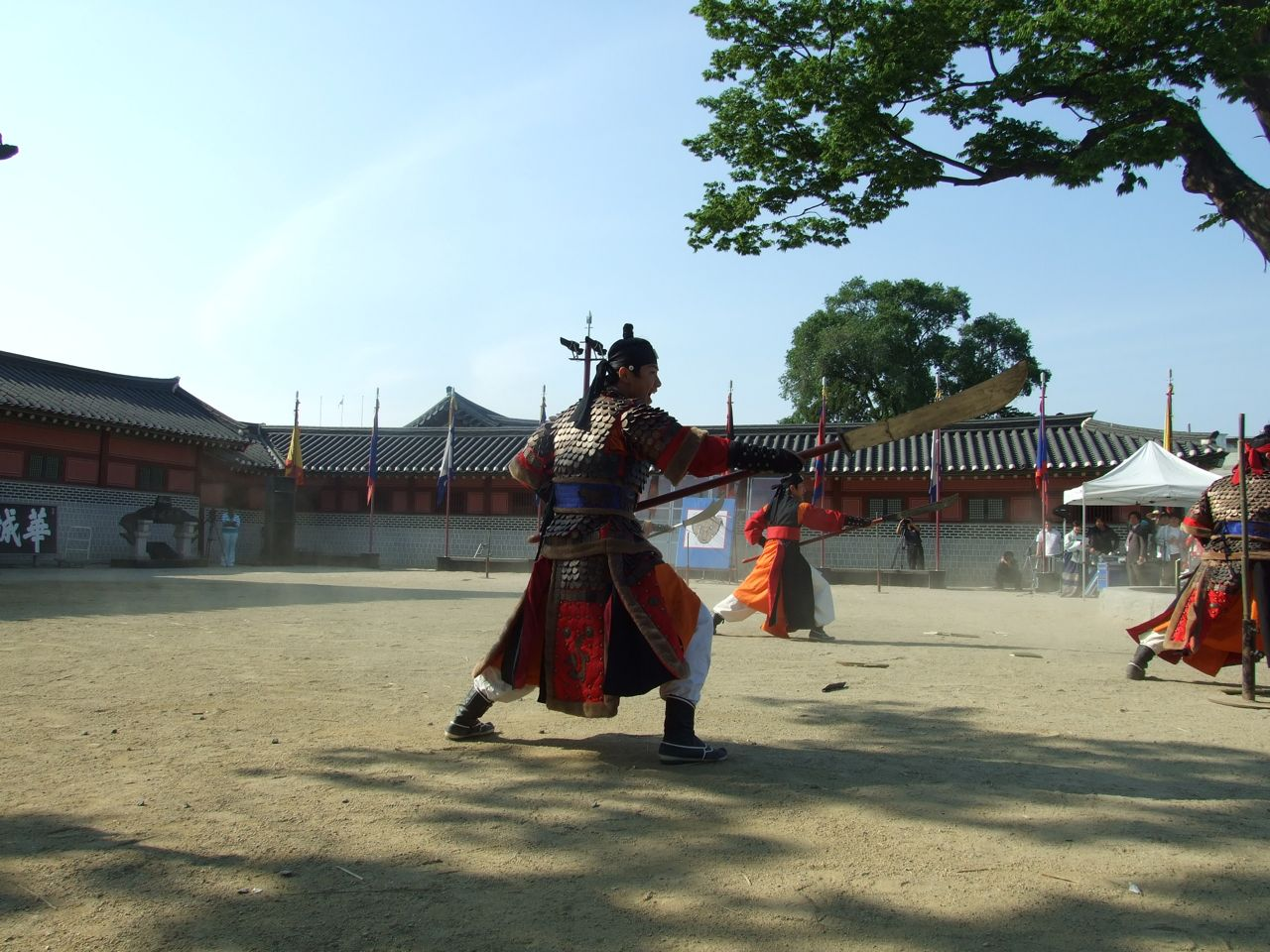

Korean name
- Hangul: 월도
- Hanja: 月刀
- RR: woldo
- MR: wŏlto

The woldo (literally “moon blade”) was a Korean polearm that by 18th century closely resembled the Chinese guandao (also known as yanyuedao), presumably through convergent evolution by Chinese influence, though proportionally smaller. Its name derives from its curved blade. Its use and its methods were described in the Muyedobotongji ("Comprehensive Illustrated Manual of Martial Art"”), which was published in 1795.

== Description ==
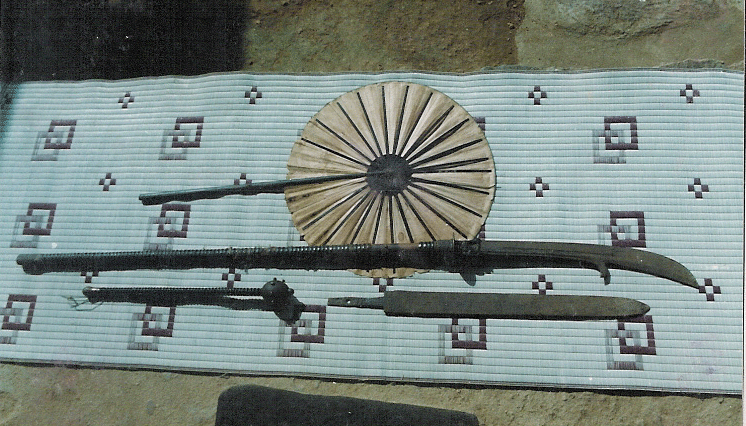
Woldo (18th century)

The Muyedobotongji describes its design: "The length of the handle is six feet, four inches; the length of the blade is two feet, eight inches; and the weight is three pounds, 15 ounces."

It usually had a spike on the end of the handle, and a feather or tassel attached by a ring to the back of the blade. There was a variant of the woldo called the danwoldo, which had a bigger blade.

== History ==
The woldo was typically used by the medieval Sillan warrior class, the hwarang. Wielding the woldo, because it was heavier than other long-reaching weapons, took time, but, in the hands of a practised user, the woldo was a fearsome, agile weapon famous for enabling a single soldier to cut down ranks of infantrymen. Korean cavalrymen, usually in the Joseon, also used the woldo, mainly because it was longer than most other polearms and for its heavy striking power. Korean warriors and generals who took military exams to take up high positions in the army had to take an exam that tested proficiency and skill with the woldo. Those who could demonstrate great martial skill in the use of the woldo passed one of the exams and proceeded to the next. Those who could not were ordered to withdraw and to train for the next military examination.

== Techniques ==
Techniques for the use of this weapon by infantry are described in the earlier Muyejebo, published in 1749. With the publication of the updated version of this manual in 1791, the dismounted techniques were retained, while techniques for use in horseback were added. The latter techniques are called Masang woldo (마상월도; 馬上月刀).

== Religious uses ==
The woldo is one of the shinkal, a "divine knife", that is used as a ritual object by shamans. The woldo is a part of a Korean shamanistic ritual called saseulseugi, also with a three-pronged spear, the samjichang, that represent the authority of the shaman holding them.

== See also ==
- Hyeopdo
- Joseon Army
- Muyedobotongji
- Muyejebo
- Muyesinbo
