= Two-section staff =

Chinese weapon

- Basic design of two-section staff

The two-section staff or changxiaobang (Chinese: 長小棒; pinyin: cháng xiǎo bàng; lit. 'long/short pole') is a versatile weapon which originated in China from the ancient Shaolin temple and Shaolin martial arts. It is a flail-type weapon which consists of a long staff with a shorter rod attached by a chain, to serve as a cudgel.

== See also ==
- Flail (weapon)
- Hung Ga
- Kung fu
- Northern Shaolin
- Nunchaku
- Pyeongon
- Shaolin Kung Fu
- Southern Shaolin
- Three-section staff
- Wushu (sport)
- List of martial arts weapons
