= Jedok geom =

Sword skill used in Korea

- Hangul: 제독검
- Hanja: 提督劍
- RR: Jedokgeom
- MR: Chedokkŏm

Jedok geom (Korean: 제독검) or Admiral sword or Commander sword is a sword-skill originating from China and used during the Japanese invasions of Korea during the 16th century.

The techniques required the use of both a sharp sword and a waist sword. The Chinese used straight-bladed swords (jikdo) with a single edge for slashing and a double-edged sword (geom) for stabbing. The techniques, with 14 basic stances, were first published in the Muyesinbo, a martial arts manual from the Joseon Dynasty.

== See also ==
- Korean sword
