= Gichang =

Korean pole weapon

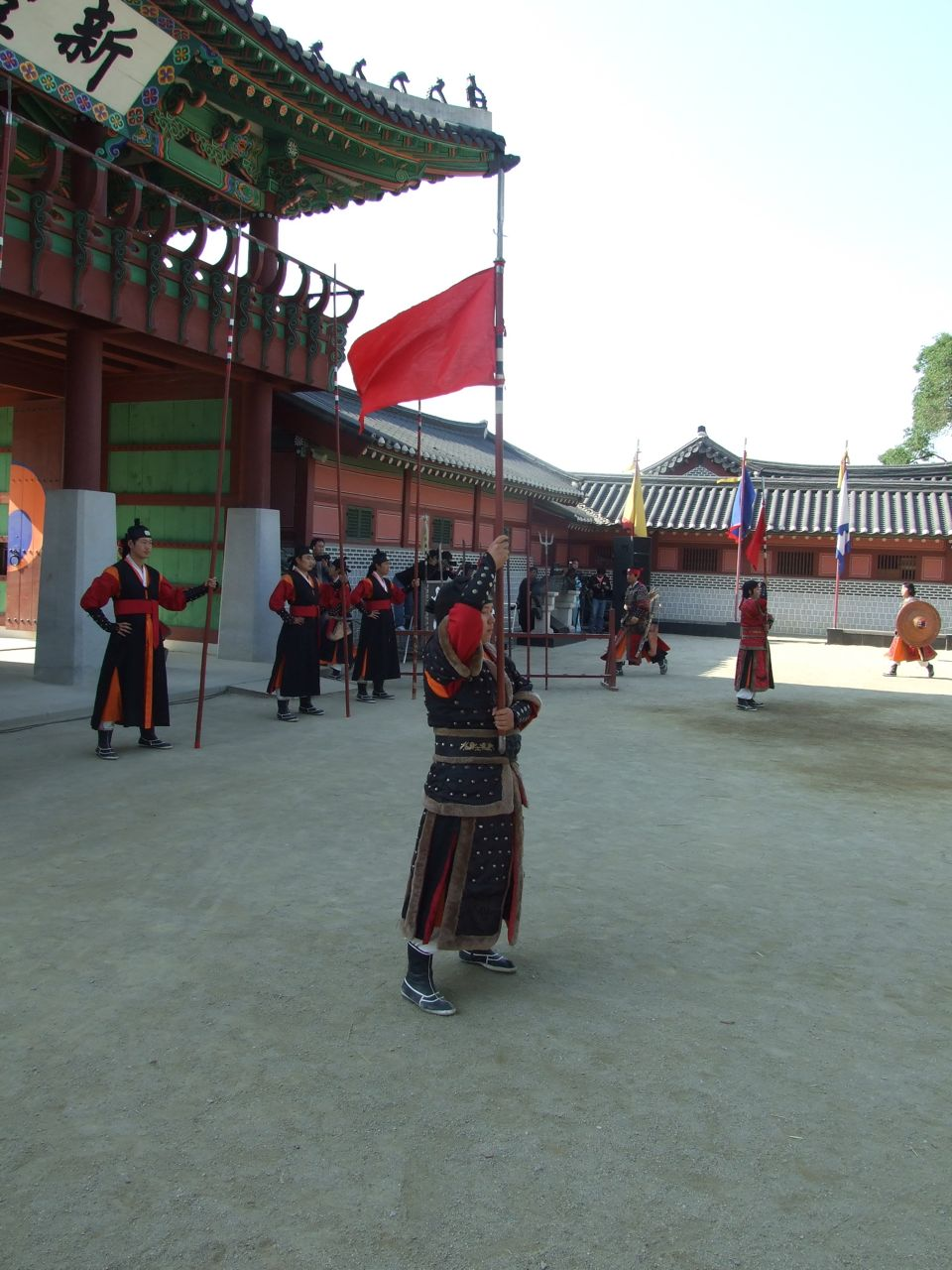

Korean name
- Hangul: 기창
- Hanja: 旗槍
- RR: gichang
- MR: kich'ang

The gichang (Korean: 기창) is a Korean weapon which is first described in the Muyesinbo, a Korean martial arts manual published in 1759. It later also found its way into the Muyedobotongji (1791).

The weapon is a spear with a flag attached to the pole. The gichang is also called danchang (단창), which means 'short spear'. It is typically around 2.75 m (9 ft 0 in) long. The blade measures about 23 cm (9.1 in) in length. These spears were generally used for ceremonial or escort purposes.

Another chapter in the Muyedobotongji is also called gichang (騎槍), but deals with techniques for using the spear from atop a horse. The hanja is different, 旗 refers to a banner or flag, whereas 騎 refers to riding a horse (i.e.. cavalry vs. infantry).
