= Hyeopdo =

Type of pole weapon

- Hangul: 협도
- Hanja: 挾刀
- RR: hyeopdo
- MR: hyŏpto
- IPA: [çʌp̚.t͈o]

The hyeopdo was a polearm used in Korea. It was also called micheomdo (Korean: 미첨도), which could be translated as "eyebrow sword" because the curved blade resembled an eyebrow. The first written reference to a hyeopdo is in a Korean martial arts manual from the 17th century called the Muyeyebobeon Yeoksokjip (무예예보번역속집).

== Design ==
The design varied somewhat between makers, but usually the pole was about 1.5 meters (4 ft 11 in) long and the blade was about 63 centimetres (25 in) long. The blade is single-edged. It closely resembles the woldo ("moon blade") and the Chinese podao (Chinese: 樸刀; pinyin: púdāo).

== Use ==
The hyeopdo was considered an important weapon because of its effectiveness. In the Muyedobotongji, another martial arts manual, one form for use is given, called hyeopdo chongbo (협도총보, 挾刀總譜).

== See also ==
- Glaive
- Guandao
- Naginata
- Muyejebo
- Muyedobotongji
