= Chang Sik Kim =

South Korean Buddhist master (1944–2021)

- Title: Dae Soen Sa Nim (Great Zen Master)

Personal life
- Born: January 8, 1944 Korea
- Died: March 12, 2021 (aged 77) Shim Gwang Sa
- Other name: Sabunim

Religious life
- Religion: Buddhism
- Denomination: Jogye Order of Korean Buddhism
- School: World Shim Gum Do Association; American Buddhist Shim Gum Do Association
- Dharma name: Won Gwang

Senior posting
- Teacher: Seung Sahn Lee

Military service
- Website: Shim Gum Do

Chang Sik Kim (January 8, 1944 – March 12, 2021) was a South Korean-American Buddhist master. He was born in Korea in 1944. When he was thirteen he met his teacher, Seung Sahn Lee, and entered the Hwa Gye temple in Seoul. When Kim was 21, his teacher sent him on a 100-day meditation retreat. During this retreat the art of Shim Gum Do was revealed to Kim through his meditation and he attained Mind Sword enlightenment.

In 1971, Shim Gum Do Founding Master, Chang Sik Kim officially introduced Shim Gum Do with the Proclamation of Shim Gum Do. Kim established the Korean Shim Gum Do Association and began teaching Shim Gum Do in Korea. In 1974, Kim came to the United States and began teaching Shim Gum Do, forming clubs at MIT and Brown University. In 1978 he established the American Buddhist Shim Gum Do Association and in 1991 he established the World Shim Gum Do Association unifying all of the worldwide Shim Gum Do Associations. In 1990, Seung Sahn Lee, certified Kim’s enlightenment. This made him the 79th patriarch of this Dharma lineage.

Until his death, Chang Sik Kim lived and taught at his temple, Shim Gwang Sa, the Mind Light Temple in Brighton, Massachusetts. Kim wrote 22,000 Zen Poems from 1990 to 2008. He also published 11 books in English, two in Korean, one each in Spanish, French and Japanese.
