= Muyejebo =

Korean martial arts manual published in 1610

- Hangul: 무예제보
- Hanja: 武藝諸譜
- Revised Romanization: Muyejebo
- McCune–Reischauer: Muyechebo

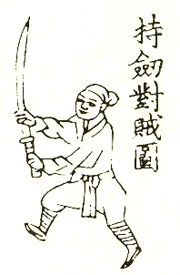

The Muyejebo (Compendium of Several Martial Arts) is the oldest extant Korean martial arts manual, compiled by Han Gyo (韓嶠) in 1598 during the reign of King Seonjo. With the addition of material from Japanese martial arts, a supplement, Sequel to the Book of Martial Arts (무예제보번역속집), compiled by Choi Ki-nam, was published in 1610.

It was reprinted from woodblocks in 1714 and a surviving copy was designated as Tangible Cultural Heritage No. 437 on 14 February 2019.

== History ==
As the Imjin War dragged on for years, Korea needed a way to effectively and efficiently train a large number of troops, and the Korean military adopted a training methodology based on a Ming dynasty Chinese military manual called the Jixiao Xinshu (Hangul: 기효신서, Hanja: 紀效新書), written by the famed Chinese general, Qi Jiguang (戚继光). The book was of particular interest to Koreans, as it was written by a Chinese commander who had successfully defeated a major Japanese pirate force that had landed along the Southeast coast of China mere decades before the Imjin War began. Korean officials created their own version of the military training manual, based on the Chinese version, and called it the Muyejebo.

in 1604, King Seonjo ordered his officials to add supplemental information to the Muyejebo, but died before the updated work was published. His successor, King Gwanghaegun, continued the work of his father, which led to the publication of the Muyejebo sokjip (무예제보 속집, 武藝諸譜續集) by Choe Gi-nam (Hangul: 최기남, Hanja: 崔起南). Around the time the book was to be published, four volumes of a Japanese martial arts manual were added as well, leading to the compilation of the Muyejebo Beonyeoksokjip (무예제보번역속집, 武藝諸譜飜譯續集) in 1610. A woodcut edition of this updated manual still exists, and is currently held by Keimyung University in Daegu, South Korea.

In 1759, the book was once again revised and published as the Muyesinbo (Hangul: 무예신보, Hanja: 武藝新譜). Both books, the Muyejebo and the Muyesinbo, formed the basis for the compilation of another, more famous Korean martial arts manual called the Muyedobotongji (Hangul: 무예도보통지, Hanja: 武藝圖譜通志), which was published in 1791.

== Content ==
The Muyejebo contains chapters about the use of the following weapons:

- Jangchang (long spear)
- Ssangsudo (long two-handed sword)
- Gonbang (long staff)
- Deungpae wisteria shield and throwing spear
- Deungpae wisteria shield and waist sword
- Nangseon (thorny spear)
- Dangpa (trident)

The information regarding the use of the shield and throwing spear in combination with one another is part of the same chapter that covers the combined use of the shield and waist sword.

== Modern publication ==
Only one copy of the original Muyejebo Beonyeoksokjip has survived to the present day. It is held in the Keimyung University library in Daegu, South Korea in 1998, and was granted national treasure status in 2001. The Keimyung University Press republished the Muyejebo Beonyeoksokjip in 1999.

== See also ==
- Korean sword
- Korean martial arts
