= Dangpa =

Korean pole weapon

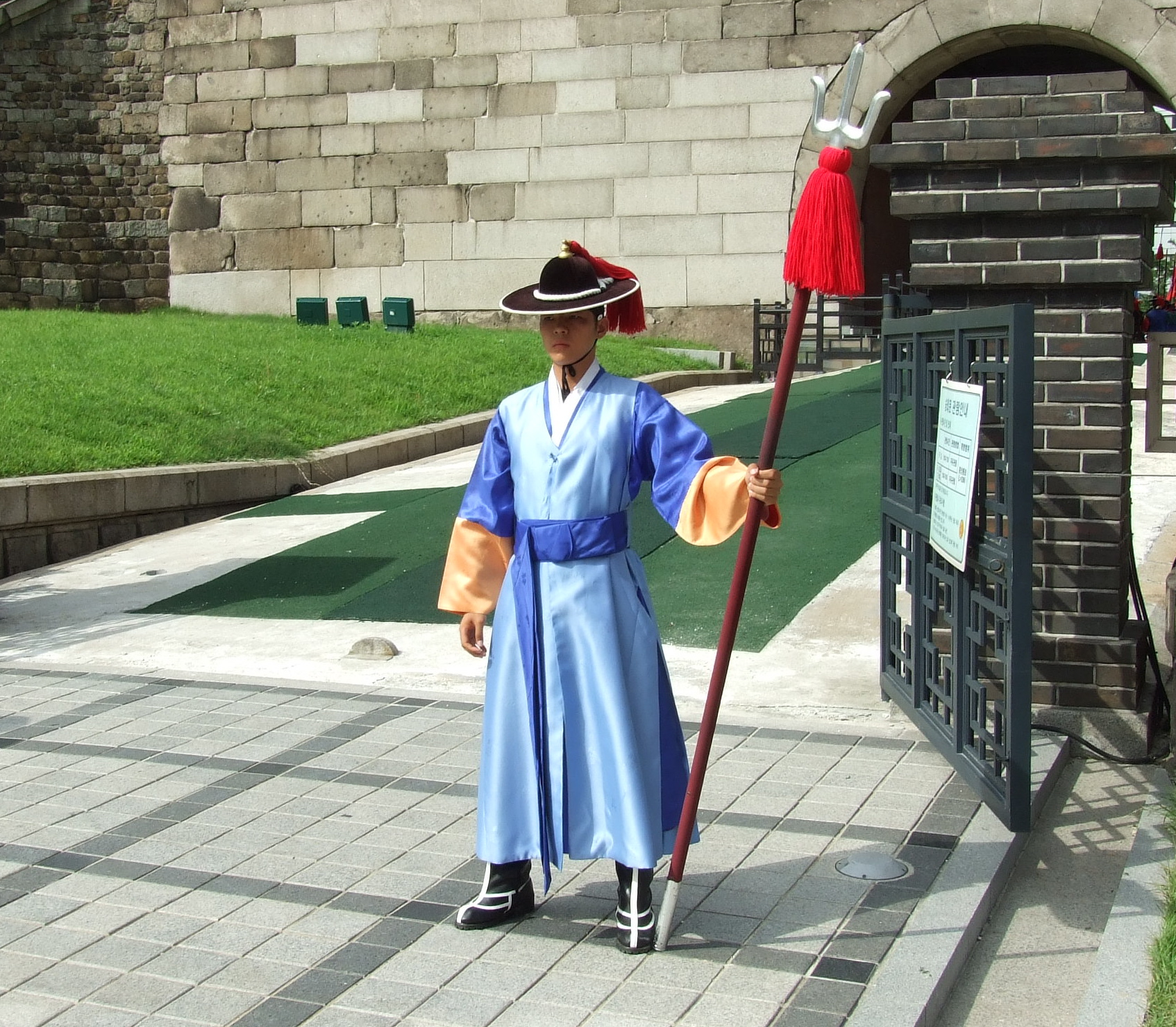

Korean name
- Hangul: 당파
- Hanja: 鐺鈀
- RR: dangpa
- MR: tangp'a

Dangpa (Korean: 당파 or 당파창; Hanja: 鐺鈀) is a Korean ranseur (trident-like spear) first described in the Muyejebo, a Korean martial arts manual of the Joseon Dynasty (published 1610).

Dangpa was introduced to Korea from China after the Imjin War.

== Types ==
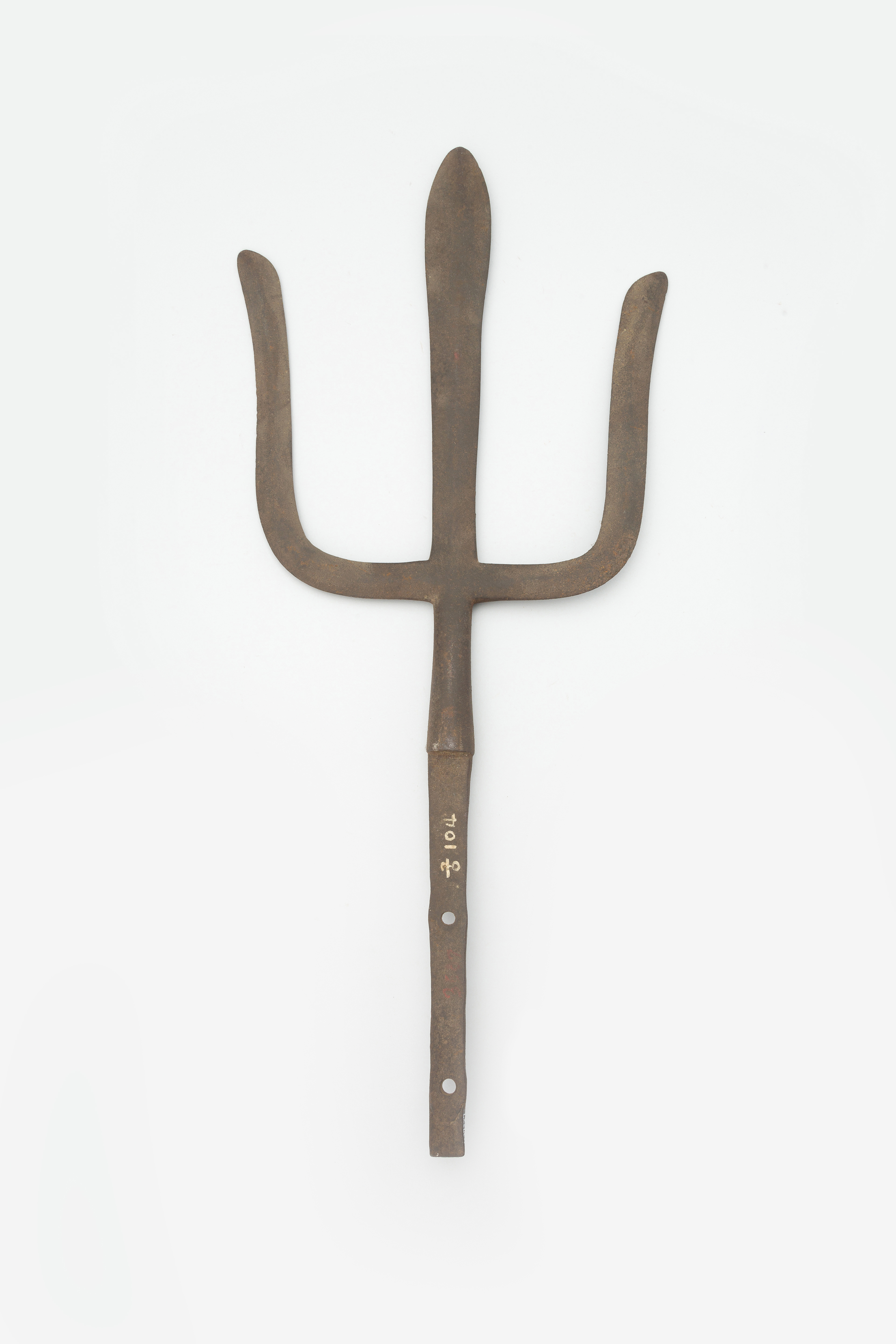
Head of a Dangpa, housed at National Palace Museum of Korea

There were several types of dangpa, such as the iron cheolpa (철파, 鐵鈀) and the wooden mokpa (목파, 木鈀). The two outer teeth of the cheolpa would be slightly curved outward. The teeth of the mokpa were made of wood, but covered with iron.

The middle tine would always be slightly longer than the two other tips. This design was intended to lessen the chance of the weapon becoming stuck in an opponent's body. Common variations were bladed along the outer prongs for cutting power, while others were more similar to traditional western style as spearpoints.

At the other end of the pole would be a sharp tip as well, in case two-handed combat with the dangpa became necessary in battle - this way soldiers fighting with the dangpa had fighting tips on both ends of the weapon.

== Usage ==
The dangpa is a defensive close combat weapon used to trap an enemy's sword between the prongs and knock them over.

== Techniques ==
In the Muyedobotongji one set of techniques is given. This form of 22 movements is called dangpa chongbo (당파총보, 鐺鈀總譜) accompanied by a diagram to explain the same form called dangpa chongdo (당파총도, 鐺鈀總圖).

== See also ==
- Korean martial arts
