= Jangchang =

Traditional korean weapon

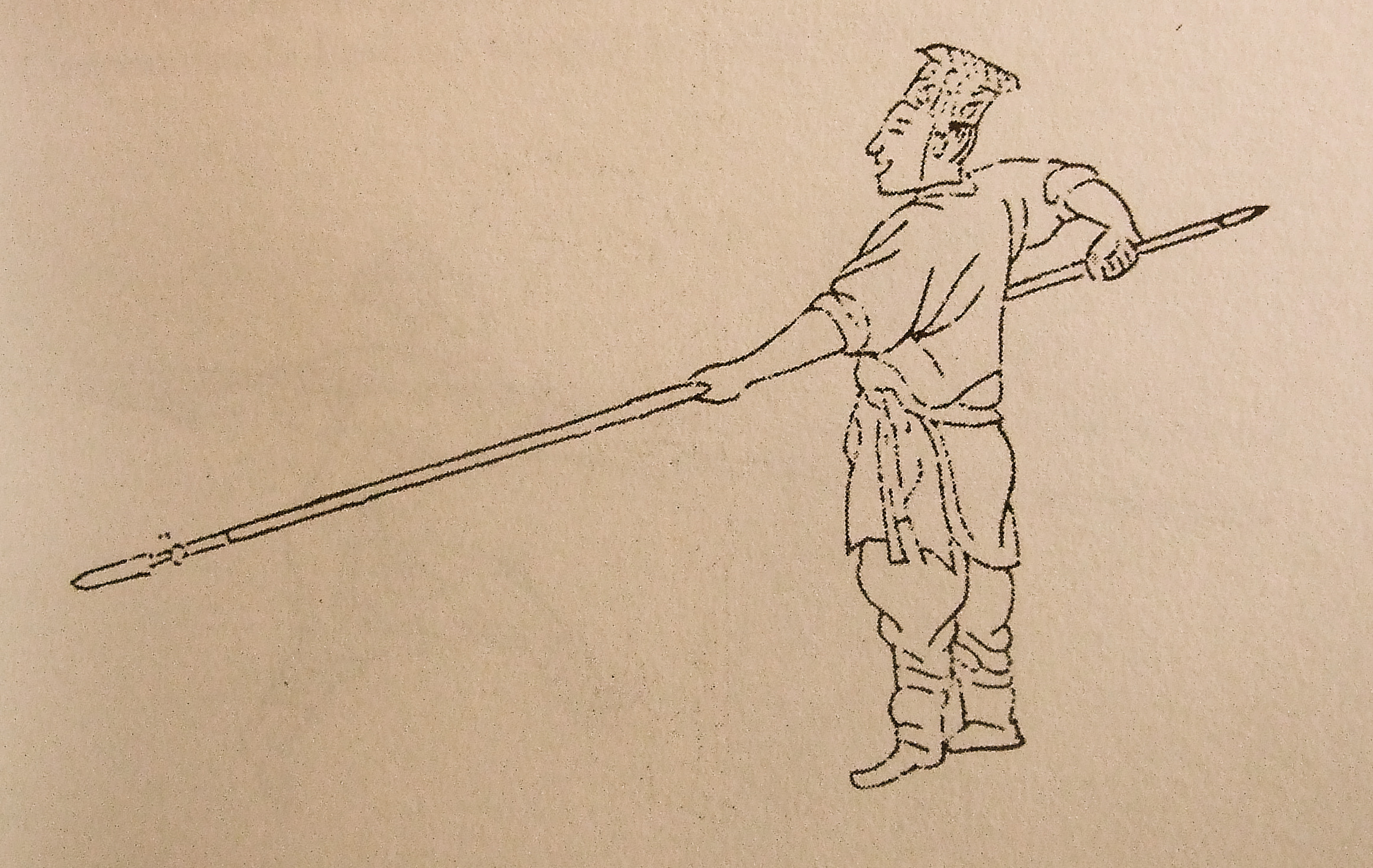

Jangchang
- Hangul: 장창
- Hanja: 長槍
- RR: jangchang
- MR: changch'ang

The jangchang (Korean: 장창; lit. long spear) is a Korean weapon first described in the 16th century martial arts manual, Muyejebo. The weapon was preferably made from the wood of the yew tree, but other types of wood could be used as well, such as oak and chestnut.

On average, the spear measures about 4 m (13 ft), making it unwieldy and unsuitable for use as a thrown projectile weapon.

== Techniques ==
In the Muyedobotongji, two forms are described to practice with the jangchang. The first one being jangchang jun chong bo (장창전총보, 長槍前總譜), and the second one being jangchang hubo (장창후보, 長槍後譜); the forward and backward moving forms, respectively. The movements of these forms are also illustrated in diagrams called jangchang jun chong do and jangchang hudo, where the word do (도, 圖) means 'drawing' and stands for 'diagram'.

Spears were used by both the infantry as well as the cavalry.

== See also ==
- Jukjangchang
