= Rattan shield =

Shield used in China and Korea

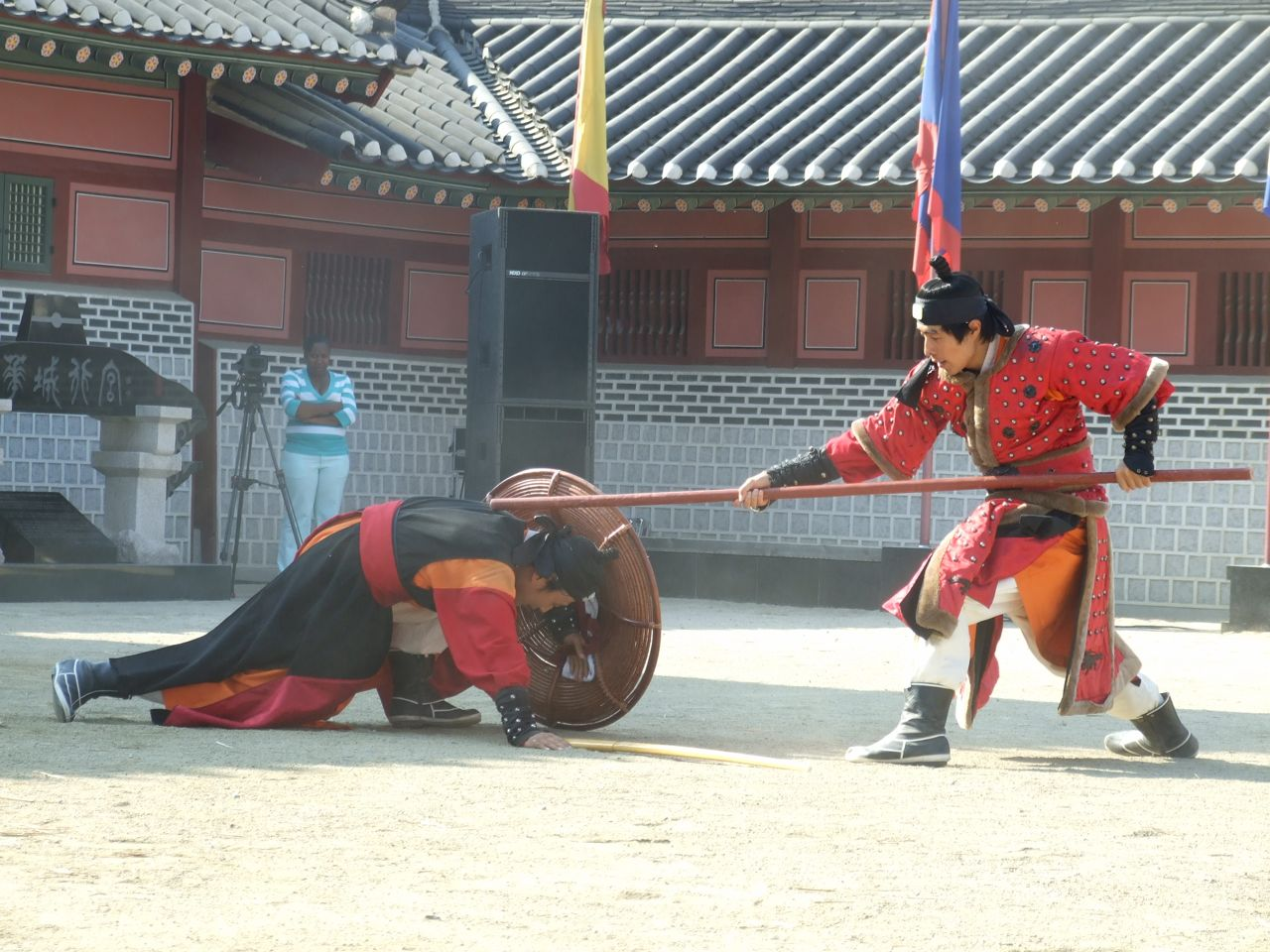

Chinese name
- Chinese: 藤牌
Transcriptions
Standard Mandarin
- Hanyu Pinyin: téngpái

Korean name
- Hangul: 등패
Transcriptions
- Revised Romanization: deungpae
- McCune–Reischauer: tŭngp'ae

The rattan shield was used by the militaries of China and Korea since the Ming dynasty and the Joseon dynasty, respectively. The Ming general Qi Jiguang described its use in his book, the Jixiao Xinshu, which was reproduced in the Korean Muyejebo that contains the first Korean account of the shield. The rattan shield is circular and often have a fierce tiger face on it, so it is also called the tiger shield.

A similar native shield in the Philippines (and parts of Borneo) made from tightly-woven rattan or wood is known as taming.

== Use ==
The rattan shield originated in Southern China, seen as early as the Three Kingdoms period, carried by the jungle tribal warriors in the south of the Shu Kingdom, where it is hilly, wet, and forested and rattan can be found and grown. First rattan is harvested, then dipped in oil to harden to make armor and shields. The shields are light but durable, and in later ages where guns are used, the firearm projectile/shrapnel would get stuck in the softer rattan rather than piercing through and hitting the user.

In the classic Chinese and Korean martial arts manuals the use of the rattan shield (téng-pái or deungpae), is explained in combination with both the spear and the sword. Often a soldier would hold the deungpae and sword in the dominant hand, while holding a spear in his other hand. The spear would be thrown at the opponent, after which the soldier would attack with his sword.

In the Ming dynasty, a soldier with a Lang xian would back up the soldier with a tengpai and saber. They would be part of the Mandarin Duck Formation which was invented by the Ming general Qi Jiguang and is described in his book, the Jixiao Xinshu.

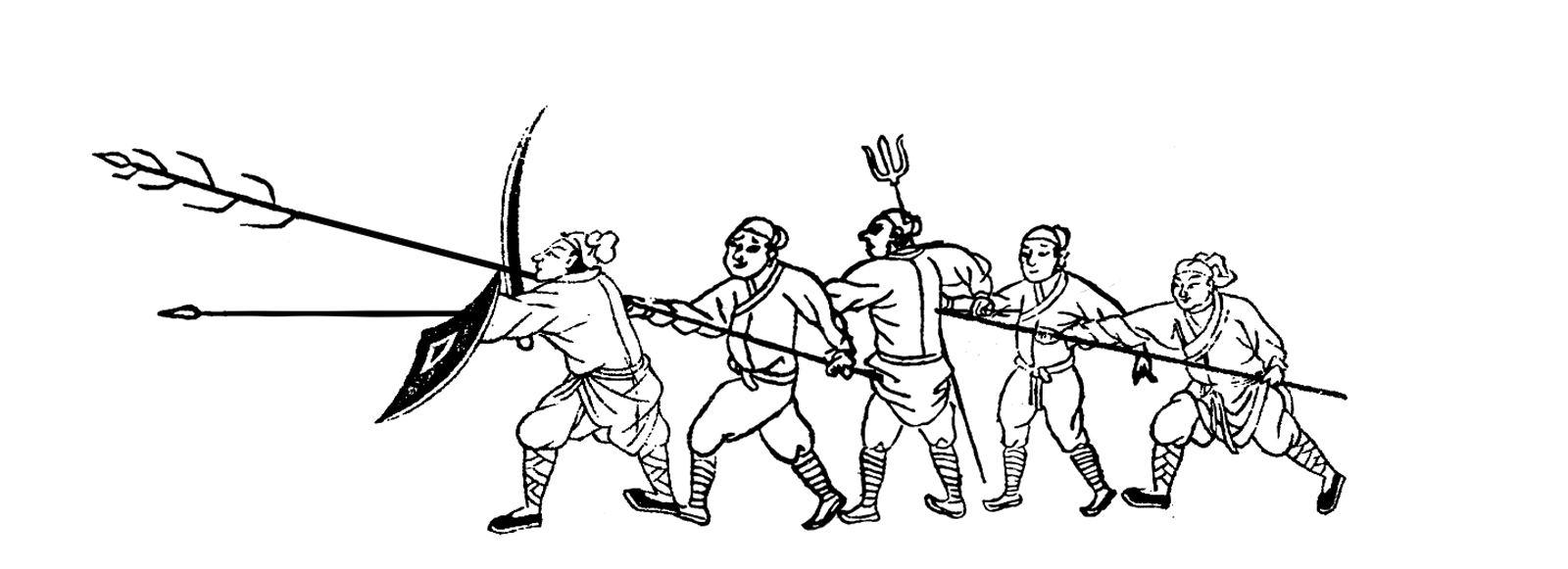
Simple example of the Mandarin Duck Formation, with a rattan shielder in the front

Shield specialists trained in how to advance and retreat but were not allowed to retreat in combat situation because their withdrawal would leave their whole squad exposed, leading to its possible collapse.

The military of the Ming dynasty employed rattan shieldmen (teng pai shou) on the battlefield equipped with a rattan shield, dao, and javelin (biao qiang).

The Rattan shield Teng Pai was a common shield type employed by the armies of the Ming as it is cheap, light, flexible, and durable, greatly outperforming comparable wooden shields and metal shields. As rattan has no wood grain, it does not split easily.

However, rattan does not grow in the climate of Northern China, so troops equipped from that region bore yuan pai ('round shield'), made of willow wicker and covered with leather or rawhide.

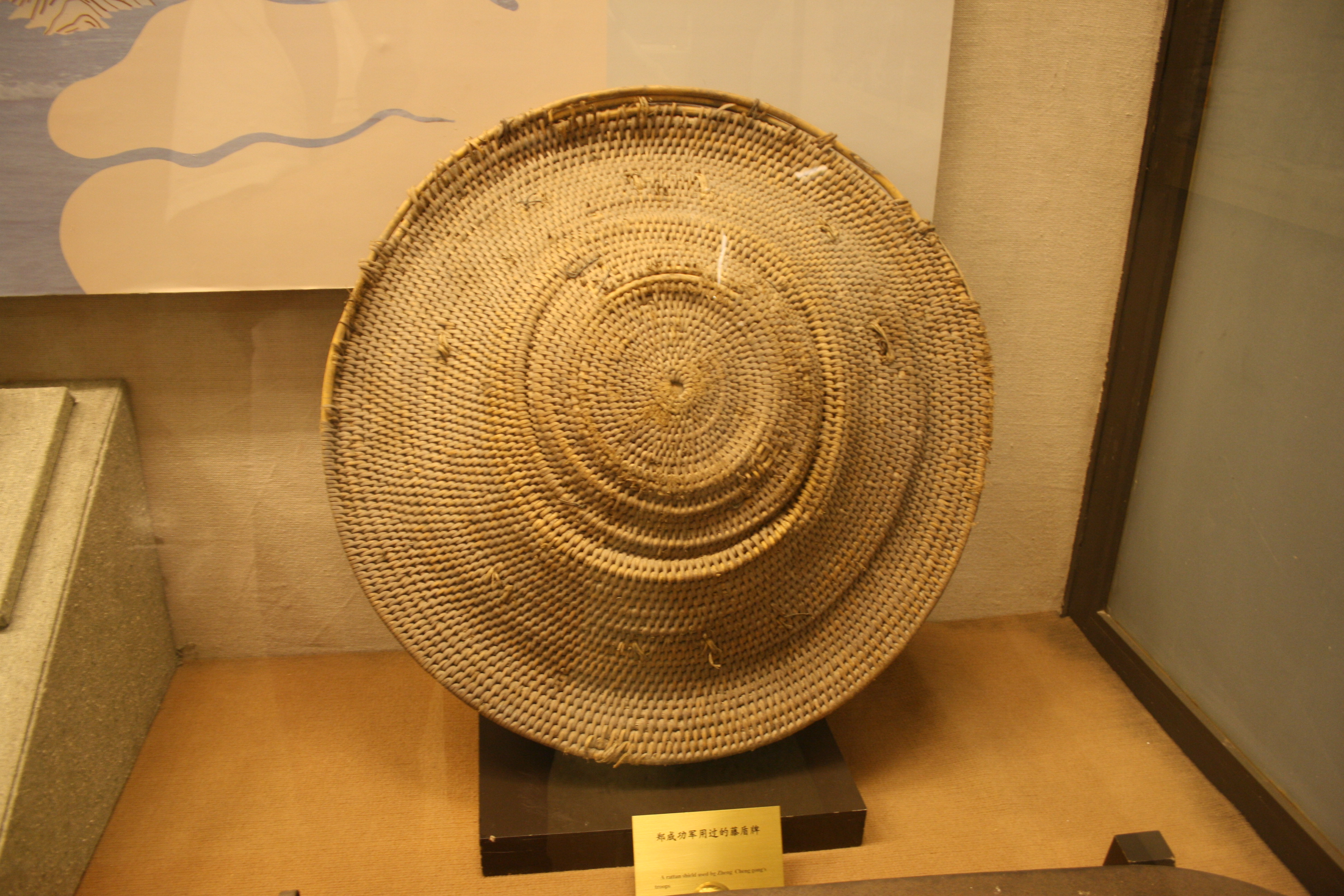
Rattan shield from the Ming Zheng forces in Taiwan

The average size of a Ming period rattan shield was roughly the same size as a small Viking shield and rarely featured metal bosses (although exceptions do exist), unlike similar shields in Tibet and Southeast Asia.

During the fall of the Ming dynasty, Southern Ming general Koxinga (Zheng Chenggong), inherited a large fleet of marines (former pirates) from his father Zheng Zhilong. While mainland China was lost to the Qing Manchus (Later Jin), Koxinga invaded the island of Formosa (Taiwan), which at the time was the colony of the Dutch. Koxinga successfully defeated the Dutch and founded the Kingdom of Tungning on Taiwan. While the Kingdom of Tungning did not last long until the Qing forces took over. The Qing wrote on their encounter with Tungning's army: "The rebels wore quilts, had tiger skins on the body, and many of them held rawhide, rattan shields." This shows that the concept of the Tiger clothed rattan shielders started during the Ming-Zheng era. Zheng Chenggong called the "Tiger Guard".

During the Qing dynasty, an elite special forces troop emerged wearing a tiger uniform, the Tiger-Skinned Rattan Shield Soldiers. The name "Tigers of War" was given to them by European missionaries.

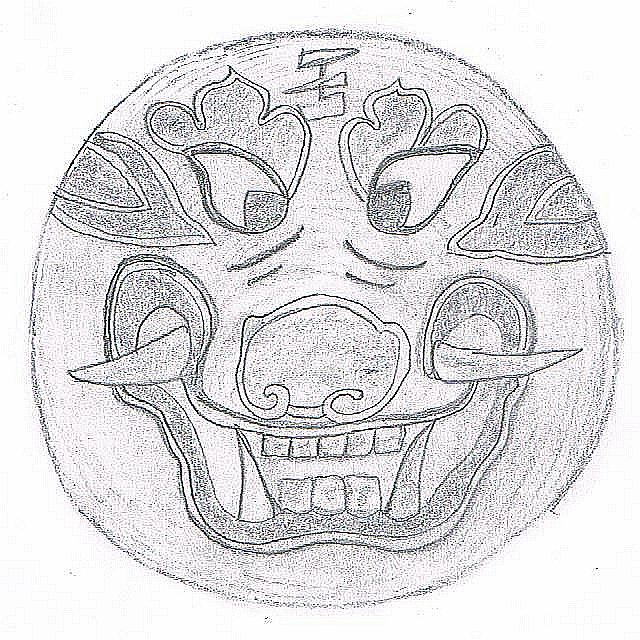
Drawing of a rattan shield with standard Tiger design

Naval Infantry trained in the use of the rattan shield and swords (tengpaiying) were used by Qing forces against Russian forces in the siege of Albazin in the 1680s. These specialists did not suffer a single casualty when they defeated and cut down Russian forces traveling by raft, only using the rattan shields and swords while fighting naked.

Thereupon [Marquis Lin] ordered all our marines to take off their clothes and jump into the water. Each wore a rattan shield on his head and held a huge sword in his hand. Thus they swam forward. The Russians were so frightened that they all shouted: 'Behold, the big-capped Tartars!' Since our marines were in the water, they could not use their firearms. Our sailors wore rattan shields to protect their heads so that enemy bullets and arrows could not pierce them. Our marines used long swords to cut the enemy's ankles. The Russians fell into the river, most of them either killed or wounded. The rest fled and escaped. [Lin] Hsing-chu had not lost a single marine when he returned to take part in besieging the city.

The above text was written by Yang Hai-Chai who was related to Marquis Lin, a participant in the war.

The rattan shield is still popular in many types of Southern Kung Fu, such as Hung Gar. The rattan shield can also be seen as a tradition and culture of the Han in Taiwan, seen in cultural and religious martial arts, dances and rituals.

== See also ==
- Tinbe - Shield of Ryukyu. They use same Chinese characters.
