= Jukjangchang =

Korean weapon made from bamboo

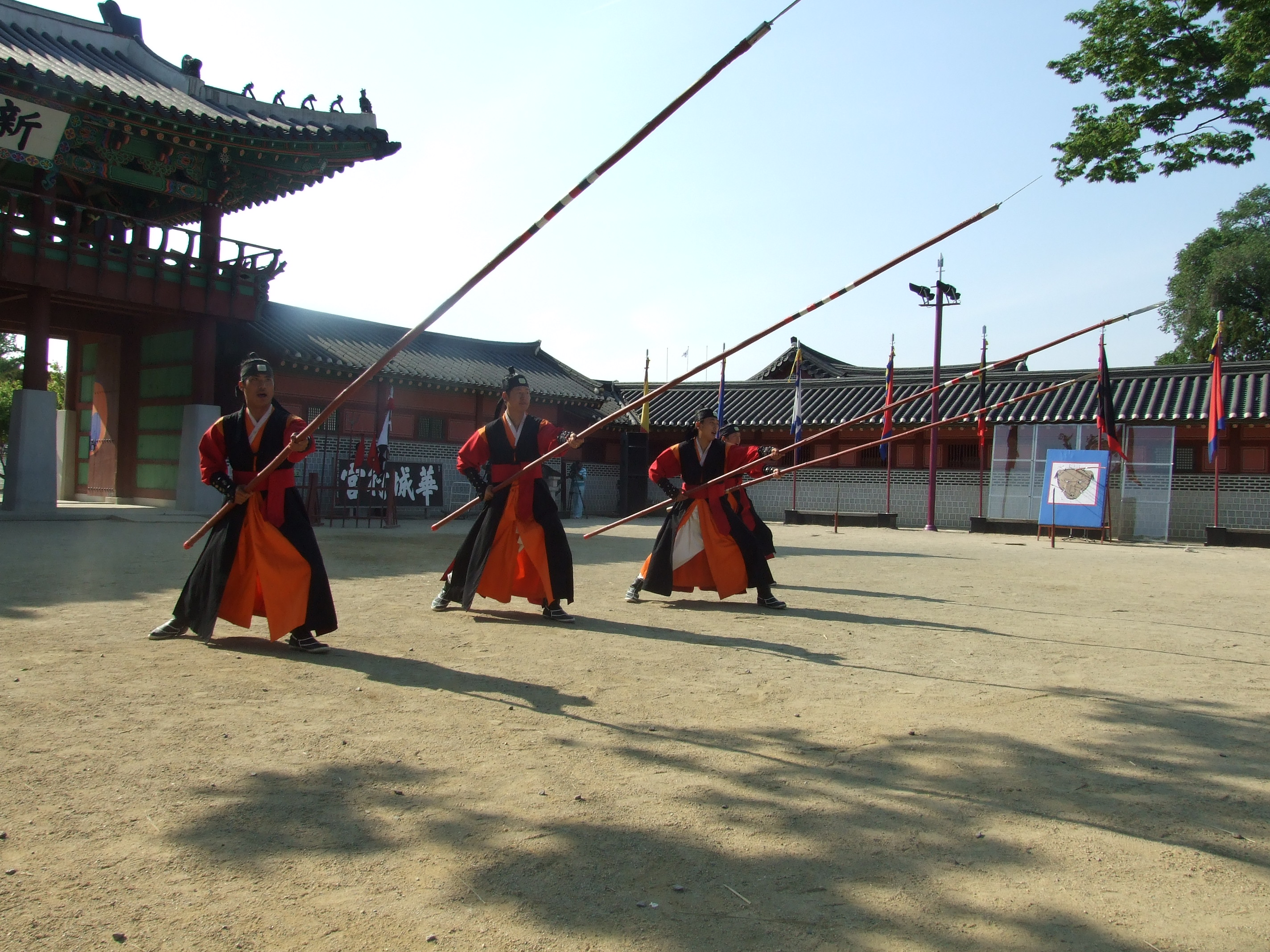

Korean name
- Hangul: 죽장창
- Hanja: 竹長槍
- RR: jukjangchang
- MR: chukchangch'ang

The jukjangchang (Korean: 죽장창; lit. bamboo long spear) is a Korean weapon.

The jukjangchang is first mentioned in the Muyesinbo (1759). The spear was made from bamboo and is about 4.2 m (14 ft) long. The jukjangchang was made either or whole bamboo stalk or pieces of bamboo glued and woven together. The latter type was stronger.

The bamboo made the jukjangchang more flexible than the ordinary jangchang. Soldiers could use the jukjangchang to keep the enemy at a distance.
