= Musket =

Smoothbore muzzle-loaded long gun (firearm)

A typical flintlock musket featured on an 1887 carton of Allen & Ginter Cigarettes, depicting a Virginia minuteman during the American Revolutionary War

A musket is a muzzle-loaded long gun that used black powder and appeared as a smoothbore weapon in the early 16th century, at first as a heavier variant of the arquebus, capable of penetrating plate armour. By the mid-16th century, this type of musket gradually disappeared as the use of heavy armour declined, but musketeers continued as the generic term for smoothbore long guns until the mid-19th century. In turn, this style of musket was retired in the 19th century when rifled muskets (simply called rifles in modern terminology) using the Minié ball (invented by Claude-Étienne Minié in 1849) became common. The development of breech-loading firearms using self-contained cartridges, introduced by Casimir Lefaucheux in 1835, began to make muskets obsolete. The first reliable repeating rifles, the 1860 Henry rifle and its 1866 descendant the Winchester rifle, superseded muskets entirely. Repeating rifles quickly established themselves as the standard for rifle design, ending the era of the musket. In short, a musket was a broad term used to describe any projectile and powder combination.

== Etymology ==
According to the Online Etymology Dictionary, firearms were often named after animals, and the word musket derived from the French word mousquette, which is a male sparrowhawk. An alternative theory is that derives from the 16th-century French mousquet, -ette, from the Italian moschetti, -etta, meaning the bolt of a crossbow. The Italian moschetti is a diminutive of mosca, a fly.

=== Terminology ===
The first recorded usage of the term "musket" or moschetti appeared in Europe in the year 1499. Evidence of the musket as a type of firearm does not appear until 1521 when it was used to describe an arquebus that was so heavy that it needed to be rested on a forked stick. Such muskets were used to kill heavily armored targets. This version of the musket fell out of use after the mid-16th century with the decline of heavy armour; however, the term itself stuck around as a general descriptor for "shoulder arms" fire weapons into the 19th century. The differences between the arquebus and musket post-16th century are therefore not entirely clear, and the two have been used interchangeably on several occasions. According to historian David A. Parrot, the concept of the musket as a legitimate innovation is uncertain and may consist of nothing more than a name change.

== Parts of a musket ==
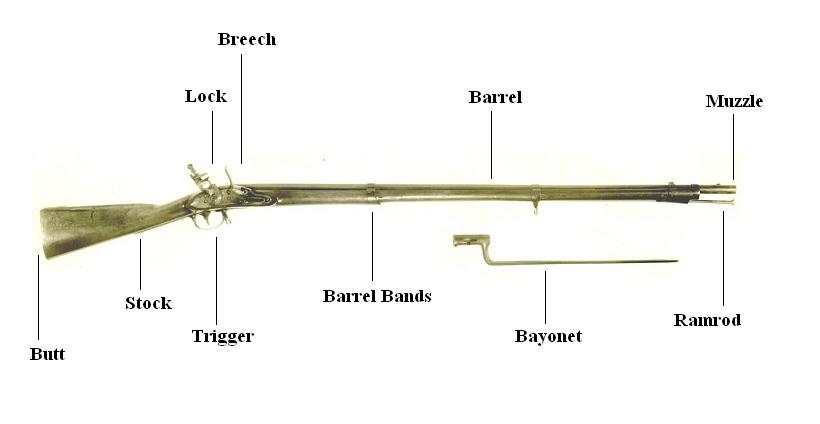

Trigger guards began appearing in 1575.

Bayonets were attached to muskets in several parts of the world from the late 16th to 17th centuries.

Locks came in many different varieties. Early matchlock and wheel lock mechanisms were replaced by later flintlock mechanisms and finally percussion locks. In some parts of the world, such as China and Japan, the flintlock mechanism never caught on and they continued using matchlocks until the 19th century when percussion locks were introduced.

In the latter half of the 18th century, several improvements were added to the musket. In 1750, a detent was added to prevent the sear from catching in the half-cock notch. A roller bearing was introduced in 1770 to reduce friction and increase sparks. In 1780, waterproof pans were added.

The phrase "lock, stock, and barrel" refers to the three main parts of a musket.

== Ammunition ==
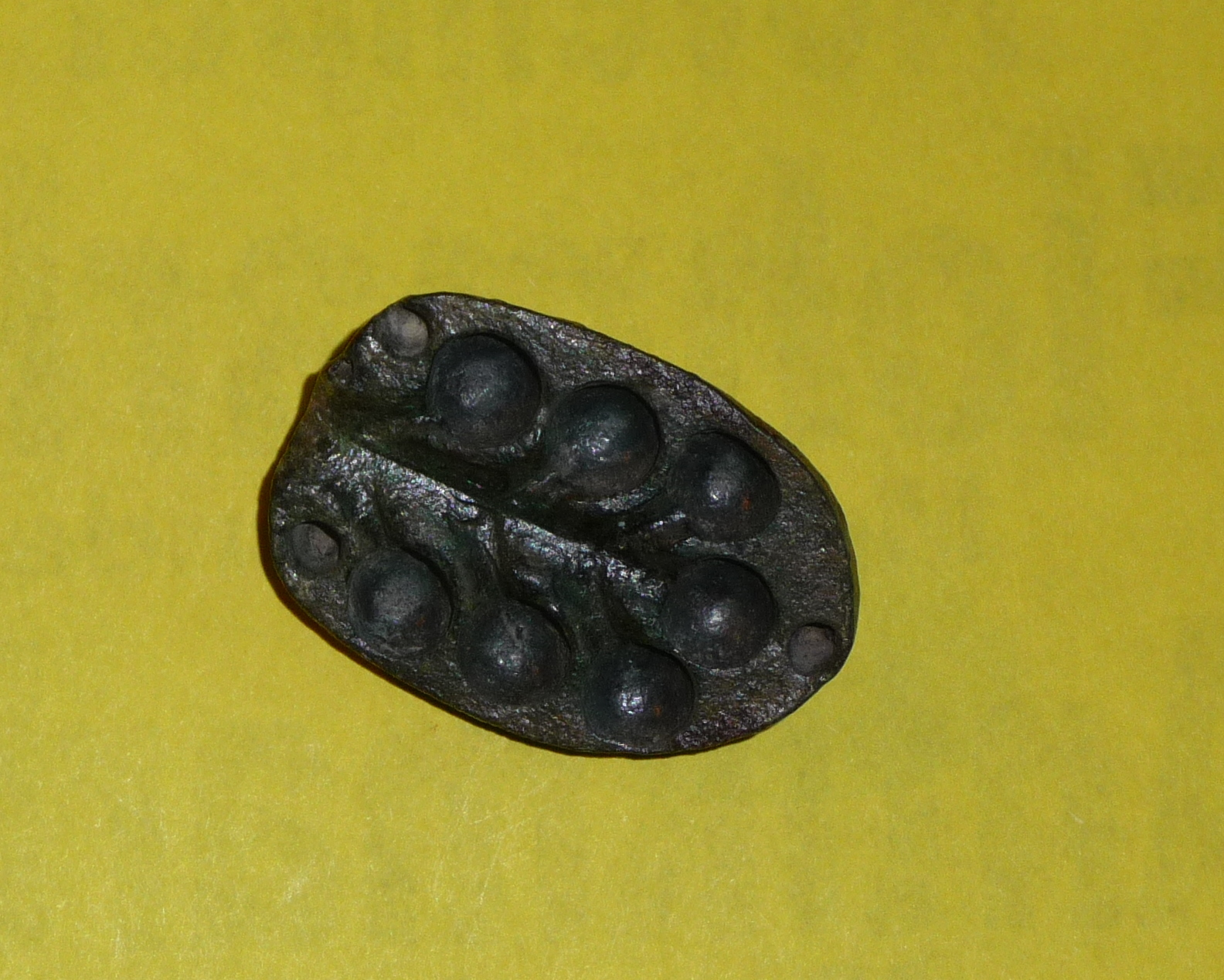
Iron ball mould

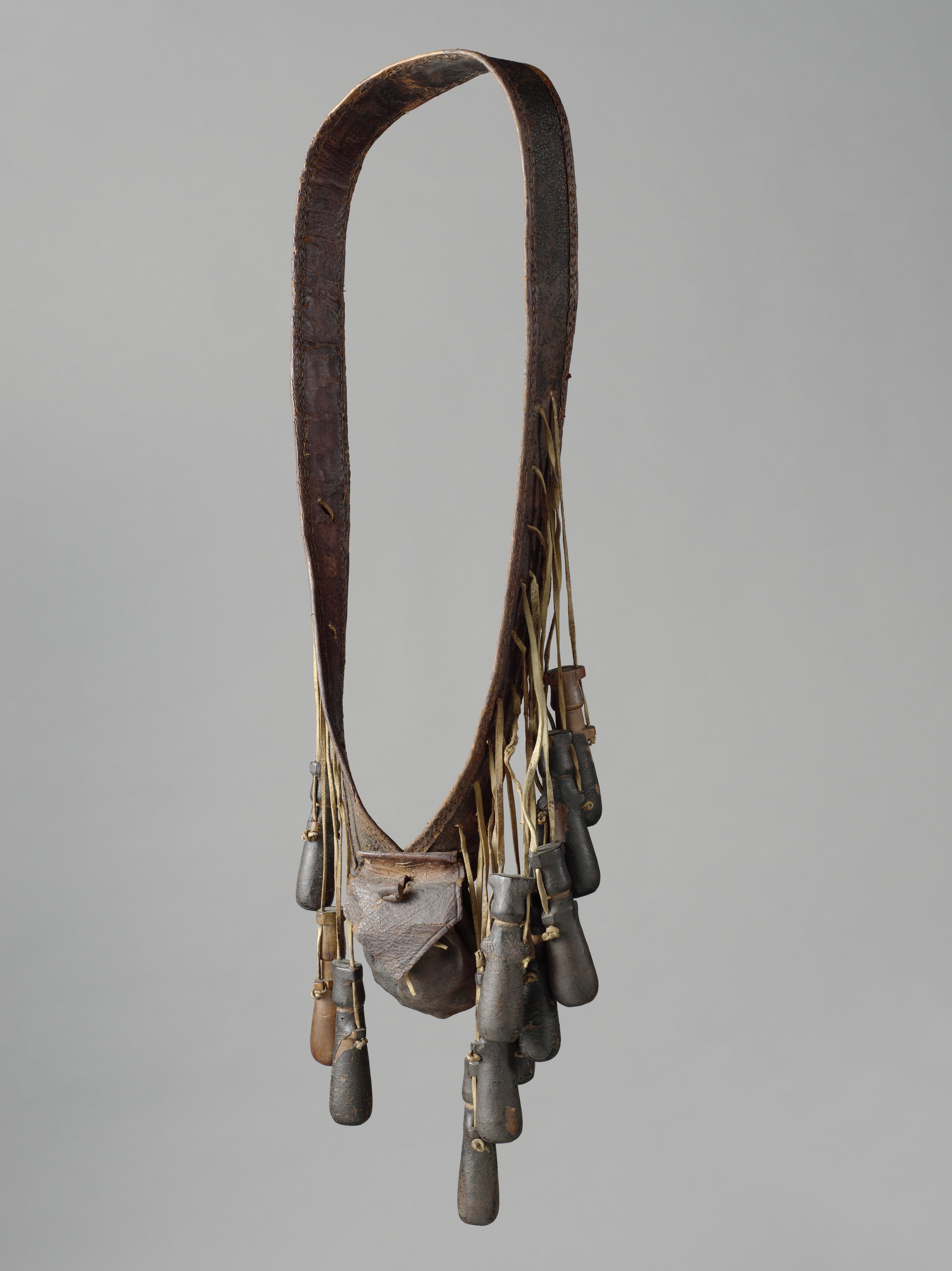
17th-century bandolier

Sixteenth- and seventeenth-century musketeers used bandoliers which held their pre-measured charges and lead balls.

The Minié ball, which despite its name was actually bullet-shaped and not ball-shaped, was developed in the 1840s. The Minié ball had an expanding skirt which was intended to be used with rifled barrels, leading to what was called the rifled musket, which came into widespread use in the mid-19th century. The Minié ball was small enough in diameter that it could be loaded as quickly as a round ball, even with a barrel that had been fouled with black powder residue after firing many shots, and the expanding skirt of the Minié ball meant that it would still form a tight fit with the barrel and impart a good spin into the round when fired. This gave the rifled musket an effective range of several hundred yards, which was a significant improvement over the smooth bore musket. For example, combat ranges of 300 yd (270 m) were achievable using the rifled muskets during the American Civil War.

Musketeers often used paper cartridges, which served a purpose similar to that of modern metallic cartridges in combining bullet and powder charge. A musket cartridge consisted of a pre-measured amount of black powder and ammunition such as a round ball, Nessler ball or Minié ball all wrapped up in paper. Cartridges would then be placed in a cartridge box, which would typically be worn on the musketeer's belt during a battle. Unlike a modern cartridge, this paper cartridge was not simply loaded into the weapon and fired. Instead, the musketeer would tear open the paper (usually with his teeth), pour some of the powder into the pan and the rest into the barrel, follow it with the ammunition (and the paper as wadding if not using a Minié ball), then use the ramrod as normal to push it all into the barrel. While not as fast as loading a modern cartridge, this method did significantly speed up the loading process since the pre-measured charges meant that the musketeer did not have to carefully measure out the black powder with every shot.

== Accessories ==
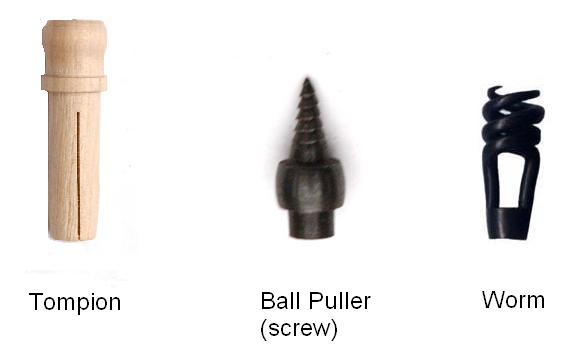
Display of tompion, ball puller, and worm as musket accessories

Some ramrods were equipped with threaded ends, allowing different attachments to be used. One of the more common attachments was a ball screw or ball puller, which was a screw that could be screwed into the lead ball to remove it if it had become jammed in the barrel, similar to the way that a corkscrew is used to remove a wine cork. Another attachment was called a worm, which was used to clear debris from the barrel, such as paper wadding that had not been expelled. Some worm designs were sturdy enough that they could be used to remove stuck ammunition. The worm could also be used with a small piece of cloth for cleaning. A variation on the worm called the "screw and wiper" combined the typical design of a worm with a ball puller's screw.

== History ==
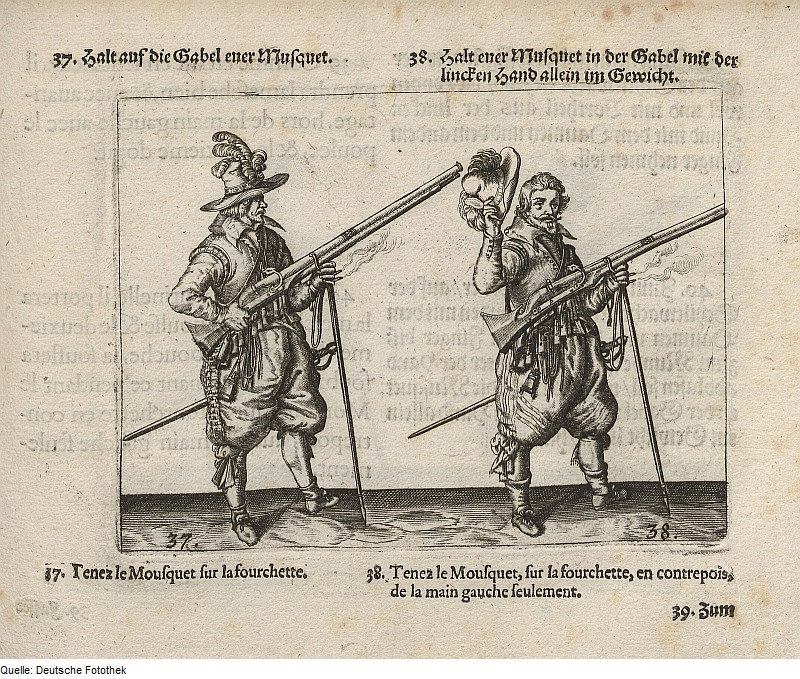
Heavy muskets, image produced 1664

=== Heavy arquebus ===
The heavy arquebus known as the musket appeared in Europe by 1521. In response to firearms, thicker armour was produced, from 15 kg (33 lb 1 oz) in the 15th century to 25 kg (55 lb 2 oz) in the late 16th century. Armour that was 2 mm (0.079 in) thick required nearly three times as much energy to penetrate as did armour that was only 1 mm (0.039 in) thick. During the siege of Parma in 1521, many Spanish soldiers reportedly used an "arquebus with rest", a weapon much larger and more powerful than the regular arquebus. However, at this point, long-barrelled, musket-calibre weapons had been in use as wall-defence weapons in Europe for almost a century.

The musketeers were the first infantry to give up armour entirely. Musketeers began to take cover behind walls or in sunken lanes and sometimes acted as skirmishers to take advantage of their ranged weapons. In England, the musket barrel was cut down from 4 ft (1.2 m) to 3 ft (0.91 m) around 1630. The number of musketeers relative to pikemen increased partly because they were now more mobile than pikemen.

Muskets of the 16th to 19th centuries were accurate enough to hit a target of 50 cm (20 in) in diameter at a distance of 100 m (330 ft). At the same distance, musket bullets could penetrate a steel bib about 4 mm (0.16 in) thick, or a wooden shield about 130 mm (5.1 in) thick. The maximum range of the bullet was 1,100 m (1,200 yd). The speed of the bullets was between 305 and 540 m/s (1,000 and 1,770 ft/s), and the kinetic energy was 1,600–4,000 J (1,200–3,000 ft⋅lbf).

=== Flintlock musket ===
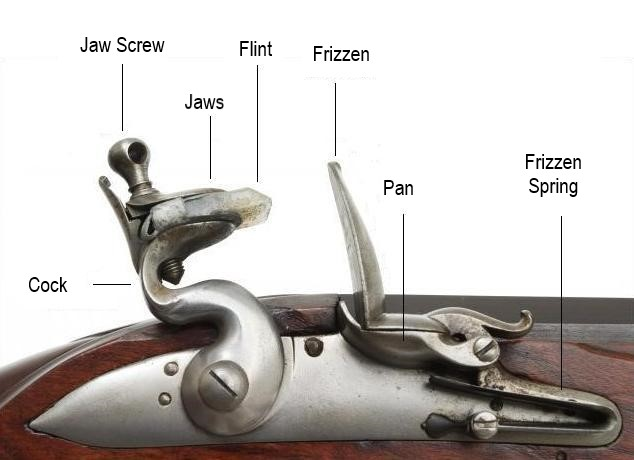
Flintlock mechanism

The heavy musket went out of favour around the same time the snaphance flintlock was invented in Europe, in 1550. The snaphance was followed by the "true" flintlock in the late 17th century. While the heavy variant of the arquebus died out due to the decline of heavy armour, the term "musket" itself stuck around as a general term for shouldered firearms, replacing "arquebus", and remained until the 1800s. The differences between the arquebus and musket post-16th century are therefore not entirely clear, and the two have been used interchangeably on several occasions. Flintlocks are not usually associated with arquebuses.

A variation of the musket known as the caliver, a standardized "calibre" (spelled "caliber" in the US), appeared in Europe around 1567–1579. According to Jacob de Gheyn, the caliver was a smaller musket that did not require a fork rest. Benerson Little described it as a "light musket".

=== Asia ===
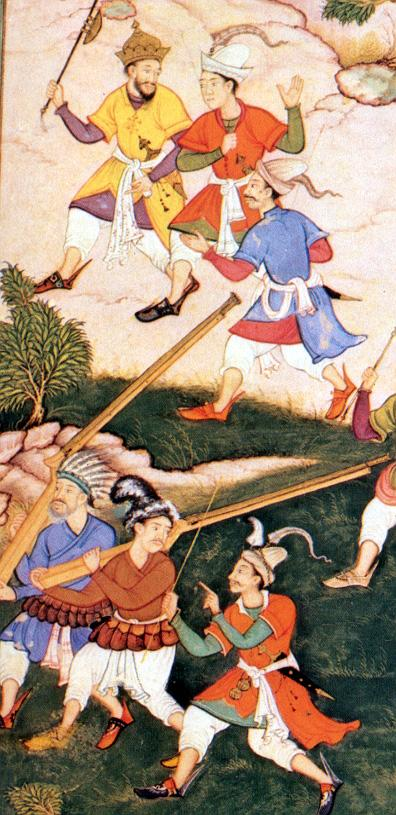
Early matchlocks as illustrated in the Baburnama (16th century)

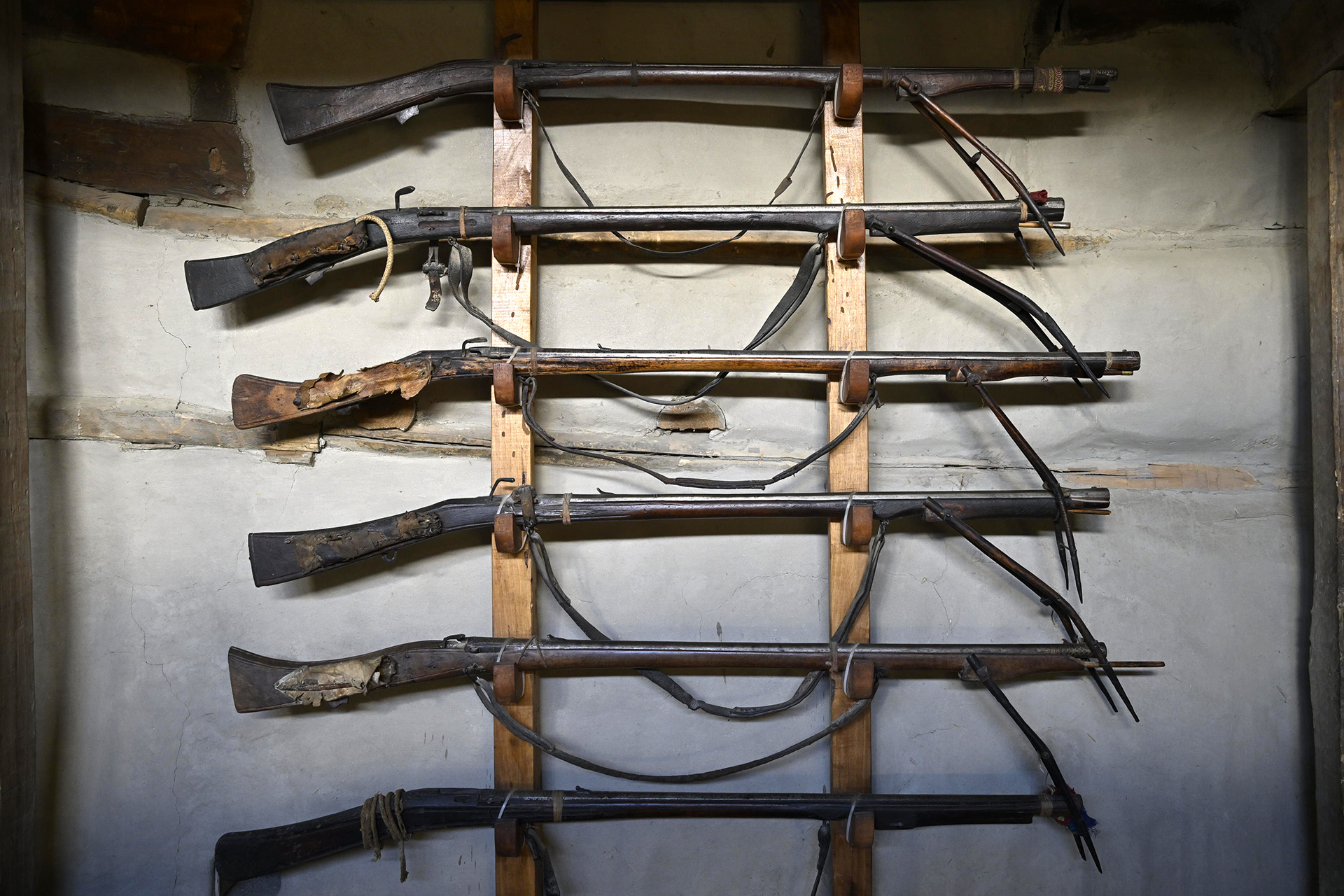
Antique Russian muskets gifted to the Mir of Hunza in the late 19th or early 20th century as diplomatic presents. These muskets are currently displayed at Baltit Fort in Karimabad, Hunza, Pakistan.

Matchlock firearms were used in India by 1500, in Đại Việt by 1516, and in Southeast Asia by 1540. According to a Burmese source from the late 15th century, King Minkhaung II would not dare attack the besieged town of Prome due to the defenders' use of cannon and small arms that were described as muskets, although these were probably early matchlock arquebuses or wall guns.

==== South Asia ====
The Portuguese may have introduced muskets to Sri Lanka during their conquest of the coastline and lowlands in 1505, as they regularly used short barrelled matchlocks during combat. However, P. E. P. Deraniyagala points out that the Sinhalese term for gun, 'bondikula', matches the Arabic term for gun, 'bunduk'. Also, certain technical aspects of the early Sri Lankan matchlock were similar to the matchlocks used in the Middle East, thus forming the generally accepted theory that the musket was not entirely new to the island by the time the Portuguese came. In any case, soon native Sri Lankan kingdoms, most notably the Kingdom of Sitawaka and the Kingdom of Kandy, manufactured hundreds of Lankan muskets, with a unique bifurcated stock, longer barrel and smaller calibre, which made it more efficient in directing and using the energy of the gunpowder. These were mastered by the Sri Lankan soldiers to the point where, according to the Portuguese chronicler, Queirós, they could "fire at night to put out a match" and "by day at 60 paces would sever a knife with four or five bullets" and "send as many on the same spot in the target."

==== Middle East ====
Despite initial reluctance, the Safavid Empire of Persia rapidly acquired the art of making and using handguns. A Venetian envoy, Vincenzo di Alessandri, in a report presented to the Council of Ten on 24 September 1572, observed:

They used for arms, swords, lances, arquebuses, which all the soldiers carry and use; their arms are also superior and better tempered than those of any other nation. The barrels of the arquebuses are generally six spans long and carry a ball little less than three ounces in weight. They use them with such facility that it does not hinder them drawing their bows nor handling their swords, keeping the latter hung at their saddle bows till occasion requires them. The arquebus is then put away behind the back so that one weapon does not impede the use of the other.

Archaeological evidence indicates that muskets continued to be used in peripheral rural areas of the Ottoman Empire well into the early modern period, often outside formal military frameworks. A rare Ottoman-period mold for casting lead musket balls, discovered at Horvat Midras in the Judean Shephelah, shows that ammunition was produced locally rather than supplied through centralized channels. The mold was found concealed within a temporary rural structure, suggesting that firearms were associated with personal security and everyday self-defense in unstable countryside settings. Such finds highlight the persistence of musket technology among non-elite, rural populations in the Ottoman provinces long after its introduction.

==== Japan ====
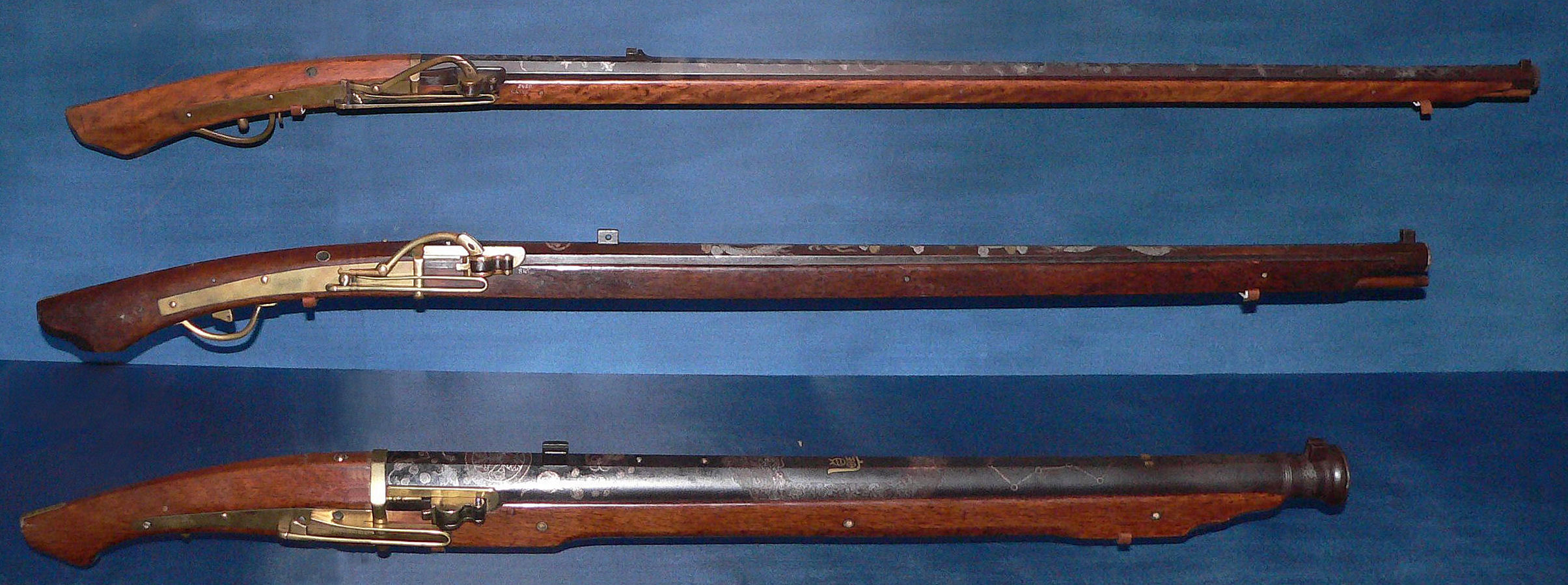
Various antique tanegashima

During the Sengoku period of Japan, arquebuses were introduced by Portuguese merchantmen from the region of Alentejo in 1543 and by the 1560s were being mass-produced locally. By the end of the 16th century, the production of firearms in Japan reached enormous proportions, which allowed for a successful military operation in Korea during the Japanese invasions of Korea. Korean chief state councillor Yu Sŏngnyong noted the clear superiority of the Japanese musketeers over the Korean archers:

In the 1592 invasion, everything was swept away. Within a fortnight or a month the cities and fortresses were lost, and everything in the eight directions had crumbled. Although it was [partly] due to there having been a century of peace and the people not being familiar with warfare that this happened, it was really because the Japanese had the use of muskets that could reach beyond several hundred paces, that always pierced what they struck, that came like the wind and the hail, and with which bows and arrows could not compare.

— Letter from Yu Sŏngnyong

==== China ====
Arquebuses were imported by the Ming dynasty (1368–1644) at an uncertain point, but the Ming only began fielding matchlocks in 1548. The Chinese used the term "bird-gun" to refer to arquebuses and Turkish arquebuses may have reached China before Portuguese ones. In Zhao Shizhen's book of 1598 AD, the Shenqipu, there were illustrations of Ottoman Turkish musketeers with detailed illustrations of their muskets, alongside European musketeers with detailed illustrations of their muskets. There was also illustration and description of how the Chinese had adopted the Ottoman kneeling position in firing while using European-made muskets, though Zhao Shizhen described the Turkish muskets as being superior to the European muskets. The Wu Pei Chih (1621) later described Turkish muskets that used a rack and pinion mechanism, which was not known to have been used in any European or Chinese firearms at the time.

==== Korea ====
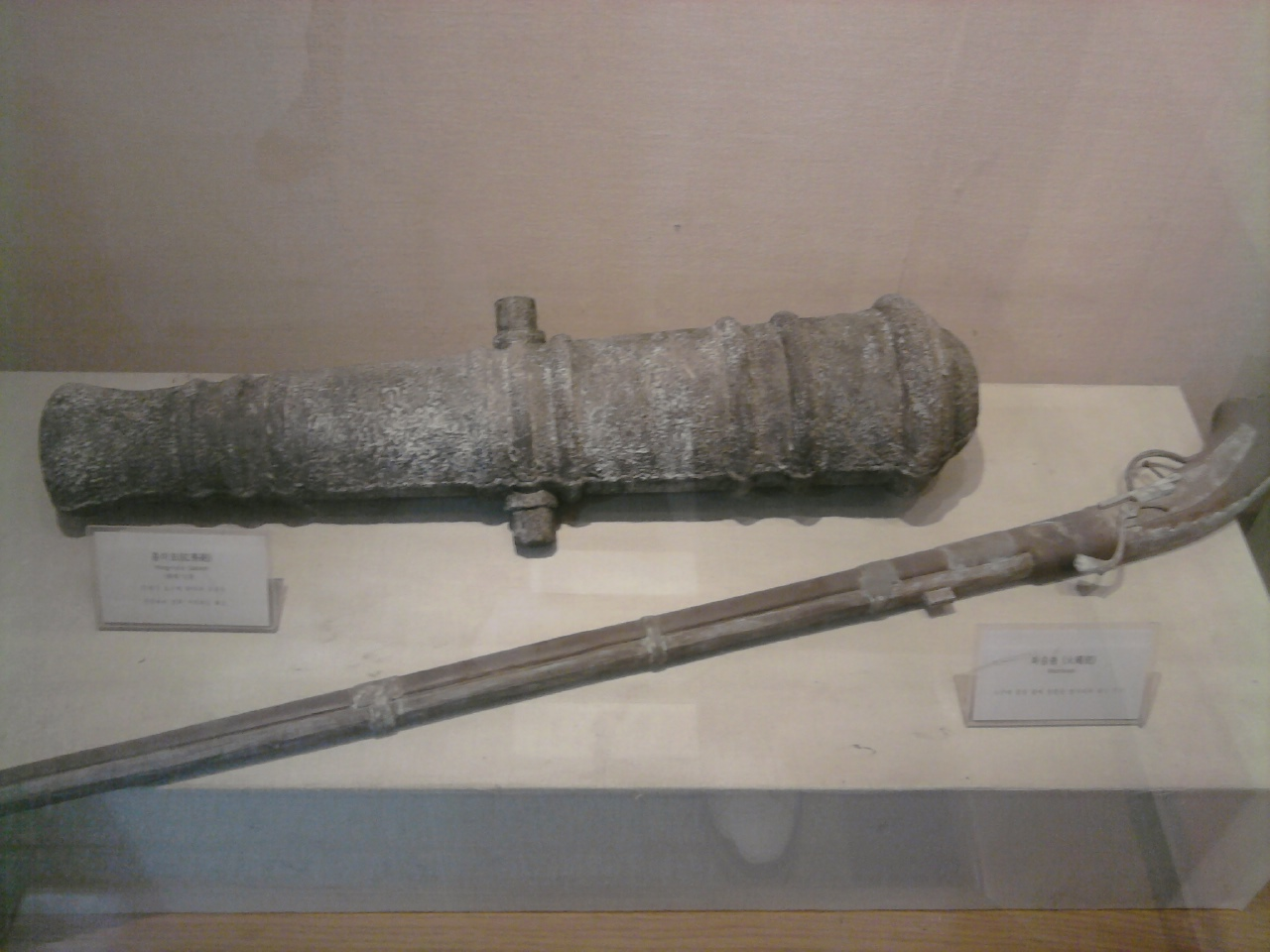
Large Korean Jochong (Matchlock Musket) in Unhyeon Palace with Korean cannon Hongyipao (Culverin)

In Korea, the Joseon dynasty underwent a devastating war with the newly unified Japan that lasted from 1592 to 1598. The shock of this encounter spurred the court to undergo a process of military strengthening. One of the core elements of military strengthening was to adopt the musket. According to reformers, "In recent times in China they did not have muskets; they first learned about them from the Wokou pirates in Zhejiang Province. Qi Jiguang trained troops in their use for several years until they [muskets] became one of the skills of the Chinese, who subsequently used them to defeat the Japanese." By 1607 Korean musketeers had been trained in the fashion which Qi Jiguang prescribed, and a drill manual had been produced based on the Chinese leader's Jixiao Xinshu. Of the volley fire, the manual says that "every musketeer squad should either divide into two musketeers per layer or one and deliver fire in five volleys or in ten." Another Korean manual produced in 1649 describes a similar process: "When the enemy approaches to within a hundred paces, a signal gun is fired and a conch is blown, at which the soldiers stand. Then a gong is sounded, the conch stops blowing, and the heavenly swan [a double-reed horn] is sounded, at which the musketeers fire in concert, either all at once or in five volleys (齊放一次盡擧或分五擧)." This training method proved to be quite formidable in the 1619 Battle of Sarhu, in which 10,000 Korean musketeers managed to kill many Manchus before their allies surrendered. While Korea went on to lose both wars against the Manchu invasions of 1627 and 1636, their musketeers were well respected by Manchu leaders. It was the first Qing emperor Hong Taiji who wrote: "The Koreans are incapable on horseback but do not transgress the principles of the military arts. They excel at infantry fighting, especially in musketeer tactics."

Afterwards, the Qing dynasty requested Joseon to aid in their border conflict with Russia. In 1654, 370 Russians engaged a 1,000-man Qing-Joseon force at the mouth of the Songhua River and were defeated by Joseon musketeers. In 1658, five hundred Russians engaged a 1,400-strong Qing-Joseon force and were defeated again by Joseon musketeers. Under the Three Branch System, similar to the Spanish Tercio, Joseon organized their army under firearm troops (artillery and musketeers), archers, and pikemen or swordsmen. The percentage of firearms in the Joseon army rose dramatically as a result of the shorter training period for firearms. In addition, the sulphur mines discovered in Jinsan reduced the expense of producing gunpowder. Under the reign of Sukjong of Joseon (1700s), 76.4% of the local standing army in Chungcheong were musketeers. Under the reign of King Yeongjo, Yoon Pil-Un, Commander of the Sua-chung, improved on firearms with the Chunbochong (천보총), which had a greater range of fire than the existing ones. Its usage is thought to have been similar to the Afghan jezail or American long rifle.

=== Outside Eurasia ===
During the Musket Wars period in New Zealand, between 1805 and 1843, at least 500 conflicts took place between various Māori tribes—often using trade muskets in addition to traditional Māori weapons. The muskets were initially cheap Birmingham muskets designed for the use of coarse grain black powder. Maori favoured the shorter barrel versions. Some tribes took advantage of runaway sailors and escaped convicts to expand their understanding of muskets. Early missionaries—one of whom was a trained gunsmith—refused to help Māori repair muskets. Later, common practice was to enlarge the percussion hole and to hold progressively smaller lead balls between the fingers so that muskets could fire several shots without having to remove fouling. Likewise, Māori resorted to thumping the butt of the musket on the ground to settle the ball instead of using a ramrod. Māori favoured the use of the double-barrel shot gun (Tuparra – two barrel) during fighting often using women to reload the weapons when fighting from a Pā (fortified village or hillfort). They often resorted to using nails, stones or anything convenient as "shot". From the 1850s, Māori were able to obtain superior military style muskets with greater range. One of the authors was a Pakeha (European) who lived among Māori, spoke the language fluently, had a Māori wife and took part in many intertribal conflicts as a warrior.

=== Replacement by the rifle ===
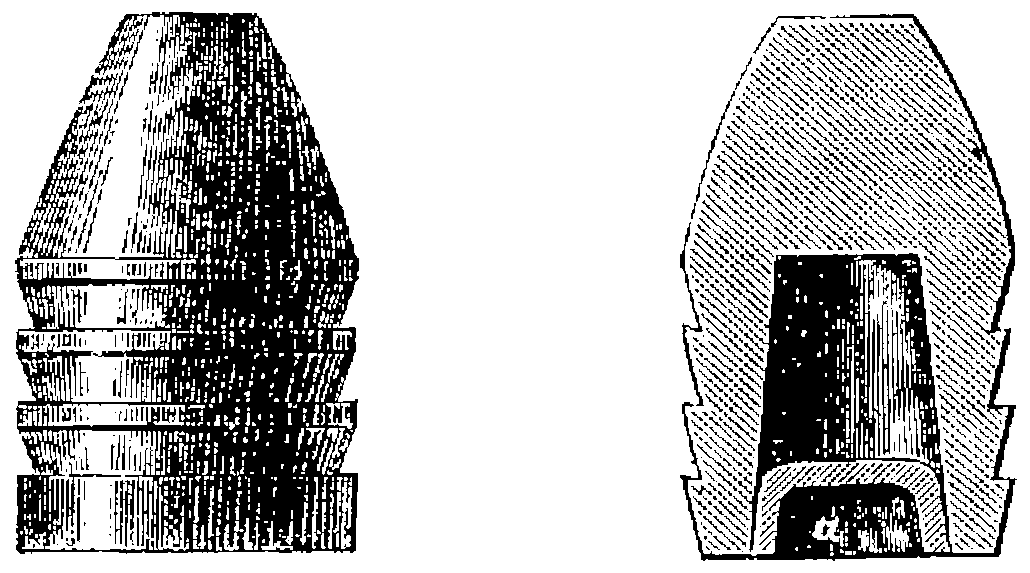
Minié balls

The musket was a smoothbore firearm and lacked rifling grooves that would have spun the bullet in such a way as to increase its accuracy. The last contact with the musket barrel gives the ball a spin around an axis at right angles to the direction of flight. The aerodynamics result in the ball veering off in a random direction from the aiming point. The practice of rifling, putting grooves in the barrel of a weapon, causing the projectile to spin on the same axis as the line of flight, prevented this veering off from the aiming point. Rifles already existed in Europe by the late 15th century, but they were primarily used as sporting weapons and had little presence in warfare. The problem with rifles was the tendency for powder fouling to accumulate in the rifling, making the piece more difficult to load with each shot. Eventually, the weapon could not be loaded until the bore was wiped clean. For this reason, smoothbore muskets remained the primary firearm of most armies until the mid-19th century. It was not until 1611 that rifles started seeing some limited usage in warfare by Denmark. Around 1750, rifles began to be used by skirmishers of Frederick the Great, recruited in 1744 from a Jäger unit of game-keepers and foresters, but the rifle's slow rate of fire still restricted their usage.

The invention of the Minié ball in 1849 solved both major problems of muzzle-loading rifles. Rifled muskets of the mid-19th century, like the Springfield Model 1861, were significantly more accurate, with the ability to hit a man sized target at a distance of 500 yards (460 m) or more. The smoothbore musket generally allowed no more than 300 yards (270 m) with any accuracy. The advantage of this extended range was demonstrated at the Battle of Four Lakes, where Springfield Model 1855 rifled muskets inflicted heavy casualties among the Native American warriors before they could get their smooth bore muskets into range.

The Crimean War (1853–1856) saw the first widespread use of the rifled musket for the common infantryman and by the time of the American Civil War (1861–1865) most infantry were equipped with the rifled musket. These were far more accurate than smoothbore muskets and had a far longer range, while preserving the musket's comparatively faster reloading rate. Their use led to a decline in the use of massed attacking formations, as these formations were too vulnerable to the accurate, long-range fire a rifle could produce. In particular, attacking troops were within range of the defenders for a longer period of time, and the defenders could also fire at them more quickly than before. As a result, while 18th-century attackers would only be within range of the defenders' weapons for the time it would take to fire a few shots, late-19th-century attackers might suffer dozens of volleys before they drew close to the defenders, with correspondingly high casualty rates. However, the use of massed attacks on fortified positions were not immediately replaced with new tactics, and as a result, major wars of the late 19th century and early 20th century tended to produce very high casualty figures.

== Operation ==
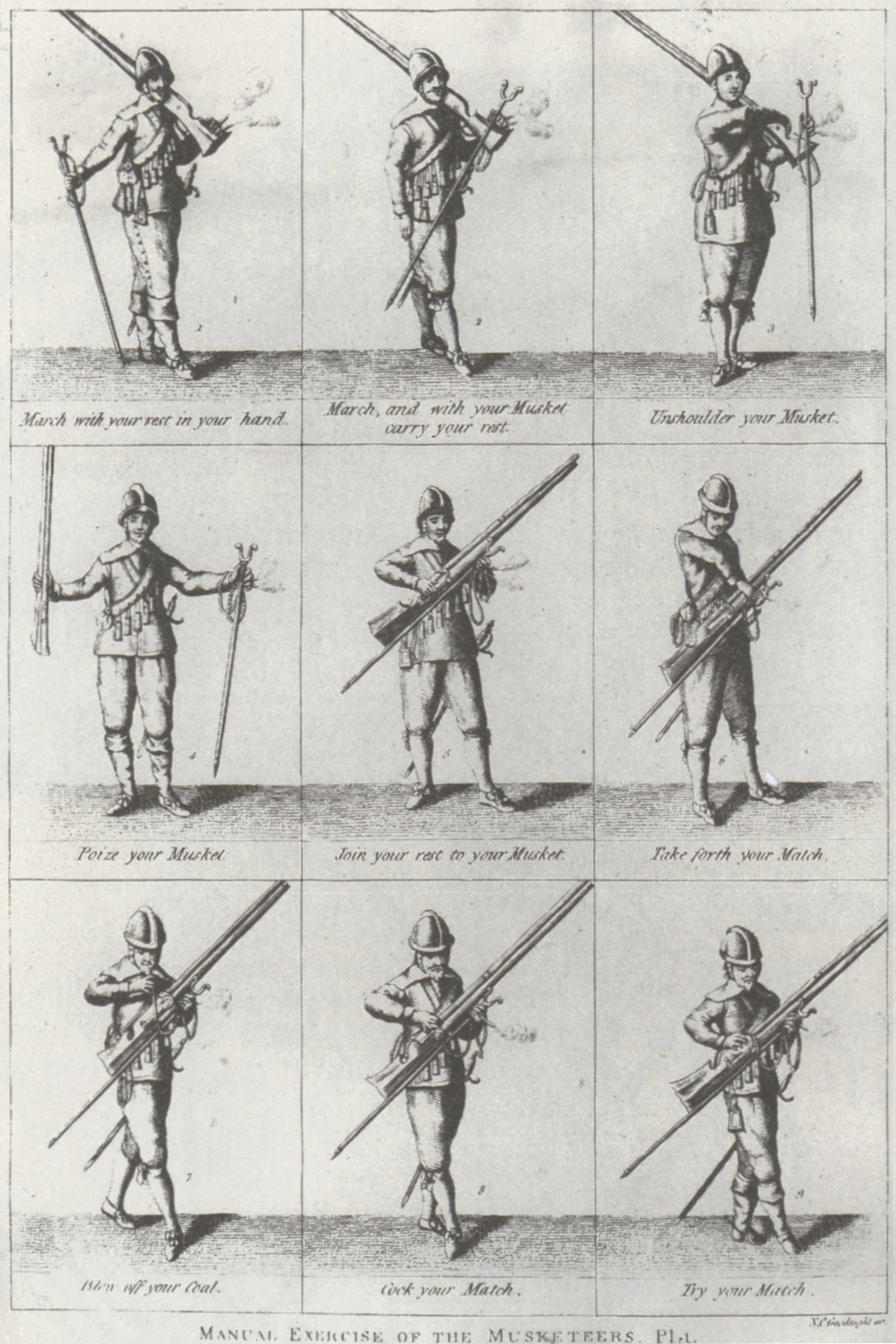
An English Civil War manual of the New Model Army showing a part of the steps required to load and fire an earlier musket. The need to complete this difficult and potentially dangerous process as quickly as possible led to the creation of the military drill.

Many soldiers preferred to reduce the standard musket reloading procedures to increase the speed of fire. This statement is from Thomas Anburey who served as a lieutenant in Burgoyne's army: "Here I cannot help observing to you, whether it proceeded from an idea of self-preservation, or natural instinct, but the soldiers greatly improved the mode they were taught in, as to expedition. For as soon as they had primed their pieces and put the cartridge into the barrel, instead of ramming it down with their rods, they struck the butt end of the piece upon the ground, and bringing it to the present, fired it off". This practice was known as 'tap-loading'.

== Tactics ==
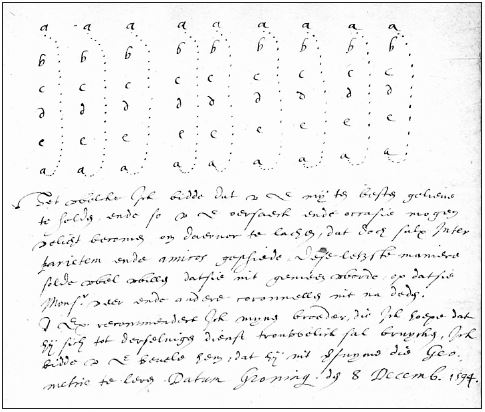
Diagram of a 1594 Dutch musketry volley formation

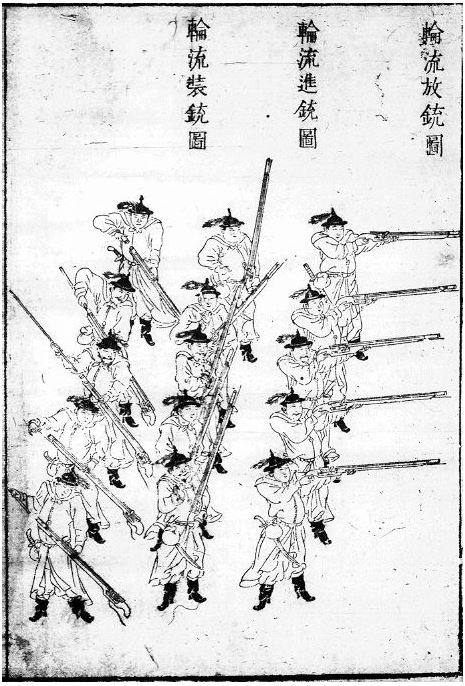
Illustration of a Ming musketry volley formation. From The Illustrated Guide of Arms (Chinese: 軍器圖說, Junqi Tushuo) by Bi Maokang (Chinese: 畢懋康), c. 1639.

=== Countermarch ===
As muskets became the default weapon of armies, the slow reloading time became an increasing problem. The difficulty of reloading—and thus the time needed to do it—was diminished by making the musket ball much smaller than the internal diameter of the barrel, so as the interior of the barrel became dirty from soot from previously fired rounds, the musket ball from the next shot could still be easily rammed. To keep the ball in place once the weapon was loaded, it would be partially wrapped in a small piece of cloth. However, the smaller ball could move within the barrel as the musket was fired, decreasing the accuracy of musket fire (it was complained that it took a man's weight in lead musket balls to kill him).

The development of volley fire—by the Ottomans, the Chinese, the Japanese, and the Dutch—made muskets more feasible for widespread adoption by the military. The volley fire technique transformed soldiers carrying firearms into organized firing squads with each row of soldiers firing in turn and reloading in a systematic fashion. Volley fire was implemented with cannons as early as 1388 by Ming artillerists, but volley fire with matchlocks was not implemented until 1526 when the Ottoman Janissaries used it during the Battle of Mohács. The matchlock volley fire technique was next seen in mid-16th-century China as pioneered by Qi Jiguang and in late-16th-century Japan. Qi Jiguang elaborates on his countermarch volley fire technique in the Jixiao Xinshu:

All the musketeers, when they get near the enemy are not allowed to fire early, and they're not allowed to just fire everything off in one go, [because] whenever the enemy then approaches close, there won't be enough time to load the guns (銃裝不及), and frequently this mismanagement costs the lives of many people. Thus, whenever the enemy gets to within a hundred paces' distance, they [the musketeers] are to wait until they hear a blast on the bamboo flute, at which they deploy themselves in front of the troops, with each platoon (哨) putting in front one team (隊). They [the musketeer team members] wait until they hear their own leader fire a shot, and only then are they allowed to give fire. Each time the trumpet gives a blast, they fire one time, spread out in battle array according to the drilling patterns. If the trumpet keeps blasting without stopping, then they are allowed to fire all together until their fire is exhausted, and it's not necessary [in this case] to divide into layers.

— Jixiao Xinshu

Frederick Lewis Taylor claims that a kneeling volley fire may have been employed by Prospero Colonna's arquebusiers as early as the Battle of Bicocca (1522). However, this has been called into question by Tonio Andrade who believes this is an over interpretation as well as mis-citation of a passage by Charles Oman suggesting that the Spanish arquebusiers kneeled to reload, when in fact Oman never made such a claim. This is contested by Idan Sherer, who quotes Paolo Giovio saying that the arquebusiers kneeled to reload so that the second line of arquebusiers could fire without endangering those in front of them.

Countermarch training in Spain can be traced back as early as 1516. The Spanish went on to master the volley technique as described by Martín de Eguiluz it his military manual, Milicia, Discurso y Regla Militar, dating to 1586:

Start with three files of five soldiers each, separated one from the other by fifteen paces, and they should comport themselves not with fury but with calm skillfulness [con reposo diestramente] such that when the first file has finished shooting they make space for the next (which is coming up to shoot) without turning face, countermarching [contrapassando] to the left but showing the enemy only the side of their bodies, which is the narrowest of the body, and [taking their place at the rear] about one to three steps behind, with five or six pellets in their mouths, and two lighted matchlock fuses ... and they load [their pieces] promptly ... and return to shoot when it's their turn again.

Other European gunners might have implemented countermarch to some extent by at least 1579 when the Englishman Thomas Digges suggested that musketeers should, "after the old Romane manner make three or four several fronts, with convenient spaces for the first to retire and unite himselfe with the second, and both these if occasion so require, with the third; the shot [musketeers] having their convenient lanes continually during the fight to discharge their peces." Most historians, including Geoffrey Parker, have ignored Eguiluz, and have erroneously attributed the invention of the countermarch to Maurice of Nassau, although the publication of the Milicia, Discurso y Regla Militar antedates Maurice's first letter on the subject by two years. Regardless, it is clear that the concept of volley fire had existed in Europe for quite some time during the 16th century, but it was in the Netherlands during the 1590s that the musketry volley really took off. The key to this development was William Louis, Count of Nassau-Dillenburg who in 1594 described the technique in a letter to his cousin:

I have discovered ... a method of getting the musketeers and soldiers armed with arquebuses not only to keep firing very well but to do it effectively in battle order ... in the following manner: as soon as the first rank has fired together, then by the drill [they have learned] they will march to the back. The second rank, either marching forward or standing still, [will next] fire together [and] then march to the back. After that, the third and following ranks will do the same. Thus before the last ranks have fired, the first will have reloaded.

— Letter from Louis to Maurice

=== Light infantry ===
In the 18th century, regular light infantry began to emerge. In contrast to the front-line infantry, they fought in the loose formation, used natural shelters and terrain folds. In addition, they were better prepared to target single targets. This type of troops was designed to fight against irregular enemy troops, such as militia, guerrillas and natives. At the beginning of the 19th century, the number of light infantry increased dramatically. In the French army, light infantry accounted for 25% of the infantry. In the Russian Army, 50 light infantry regiments and one company in each battalion were formed, which accounted for about 40% of light infantry in the entire infantry.

=== Attack column ===
In the 19th century, a new tactic was devised by the French during the French Revolutionary Wars. This was the 'colonne d'attaque', or attack column, consisting of one regiment up to two brigades of infantry. Instead of advancing slowly all across the battlefield in line formations, the French infantry were brought forward in such columns, preceded by masses of skirmishers to cover and mask their advance. The column would then normally deploy into line right before engaging the enemy with either fire or bayonet. This allowed the French Revolutionary and Napoleonic infantry a much greater degree of mobility compared to their Ancien Régime opponents, and also allowed much closer cooperation of infantry with cavalry and artillery, which were free to move in between the infantry columns of the former rather than being trapped in between the linear formation of the latter. The colonne d'attaque was henceforth adopted by all European armies during and after the Napoleonic Wars. While some British historians, such as Sir Charles Oman, have postulated that it was the standard French tactic to charge enemy lines of infantry head on with their columns, relying on the morale effect of the huge column, and hence were often beaten off by the devastating firepower of the redcoats, more current research into the subject has revealed that such occasions were far from the norm, and that the French normally tried deploying into lines before combat as well.

== See also ==
- Grenadier
- Line infantry
- Musketoon
- Musketeer
- Pike and shot

== Bibliography ==
- Adle, Chahryar (2003), History of Civilizations of Central Asia: Development in Contrast: from the Sixteenth to the Mid-Nineteenth Century
- Ágoston, Gábor (2008), Guns for the Sultan: Military Power and the Weapons Industry in the Ottoman Empire, Cambridge University Press, ISBN 978-0-521-60391-1
- Agrawal, Jai Prakash (2010), High Energy Materials: Propellants, Explosives and Pyrotechnics, Wiley-VCH
- Andrade, Tonio (2016), The Gunpowder Age: China, Military Innovation, and the Rise of the West in World History, Princeton University Press, ISBN 978-0-691-13597-7.
- Arnold, Thomas (2001), The Renaissance at War, Cassell & Co, ISBN 0-304-35270-5
- Bak, J. M. (1982), Hunyadi to Rákóczi: War and Society in Late Medieval and Early Modern Hungary
- Barwick, Humphrey (1594), Breefe Discourse Concerning the Force and Effect of all Manuall of Weapons of Fire...
- Benton, James G., Captain (1862). A Course of Instruction in Ordnance and Gunnery (2 ed.). West Point, New York: Thomas Publications. ISBN 1-57747-079-6.
- Brown, G. I. (1998), The Big Bang: A History of Explosives, Sutton Publishing, ISBN 0-7509-1878-0.
- Buchanan, Brenda J., ed. (2006), "Gunpowder, Explosives and the State: A Technological History", Technology and Culture, vol. 49, Aldershot: Ashgate, pp. 785–786, doi:10.1353/tech.0.0051, ISBN 0-7546-5259-9, S2CID 111173101
- Chase, Kenneth (2003), Firearms: A Global History to 1700, Cambridge University Press, ISBN 0-521-82274-2.
- Cocroft, Wayne (2000), Dangerous Energy: The archaeology of gunpowder and military explosives manufacture, Swindon: English Heritage, ISBN 1-85074-718-0
- Cowley, Robert (1993), Experience of War, Laurel.
- Cressy, David (2013), Saltpeter: The Mother of Gunpowder, Oxford University Press
- Crosby, Alfred W. (2002), Throwing Fire: Projectile Technology Through History, Cambridge University Press, ISBN 0-521-79158-8.
- Curtis, W. S. (2014), Long Range Shooting: A Historical Perspective, WeldenOwen.
- Earl, Brian (1978), Cornish Explosives, Cornwall: The Trevithick Society, ISBN 0-904040-13-5.
- Easton, S. C. (1952), Roger Bacon and His Search for a Universal Science: A Reconsideration of the Life and Work of Roger Bacon in the Light of His Own Stated Purposes, Basil Blackwell
- Ebrey, Patricia B. (1999), The Cambridge Illustrated History of China, Cambridge University Press, ISBN 0-521-43519-6
- Eltis, David (1998), The Military Revolution in Sixteenth-Century Europe
- Grant, R.G. (2011), Battle at Sea: 3,000 Years of Naval Warfare, DK Publishing.
- Hadden, R. Lee. 2005. "Confederate Boys and Peter Monkeys." Armchair General. January 2005. Adapted from a talk given to the Geological Society of America on 25 March 2004.
- Hall, Bert S. (1997), Weapons and Warfare in Renaissance Europe
- Harding, Richard (1999), Seapower and Naval Warfare, 1650–1830, UCL Press Limited
- al-Hassan, Ahmad Y. (2001), "Potassium Nitrate in Arabic and Latin Sources", History of Science and Technology in Islam.
- Hobson, John M. (2004), The Eastern Origins of Western Civilisation, Cambridge University Press.
- Janin, Hunt (2013), Mercenaries in Medieval and Renaissance Europe
- Johnson, Norman Gardner. "explosive". Encyclopædia Britannica. Encyclopædia Britannica Online. Chicago.
- Keegan, John (1993), A History of Warfare, Vintage Books
- Kelly, Jack (2004), Gunpowder: Alchemy, Bombards, & Pyrotechnics: The History of the Explosive that Changed the World, Basic Books, ISBN 0-465-03718-6.
- Khan, Iqtidar Alam (1996), "Coming of Gunpowder to the Islamic World and North India: Spotlight on the Role of the Mongols", Journal of Asian History, 30: 41–5.
- Khan, Iqtidar Alam (2004), Gunpowder and Firearms: Warfare in Medieval India, Oxford University Press
- Khan, Iqtidar Alam (2008), Historical Dictionary of Medieval India, The Scarecrow Press, Inc., ISBN 978-0-8108-5503-8
- Kinard, Jeff (2007), Artillery An Illustrated History of its Impact
- Nagayama, Kōkan (1997), The Connoisseur's Book of Japanese Swords
- Konstam, Angus (2002), Renaissance War Galley 1470–1590, New Vanguard 62, Osprey Publishing, ISBN 9781841764436.
- Liang, Jieming (2006), Chinese Siege Warfare: Mechanical Artillery & Siege Weapons of Antiquity, Singapore, Republic of Singapore: Leong Kit Meng, ISBN 981-05-5380-3
- Lidin, Olaf G. (2002), Tanegashima – The Arrival of Europe in Japan, Nordic Inst of Asian Studies, ISBN 8791114128
- Little, Benerson (2010), How History's Greatest Pirates Pillaged, Plundered, and Got Away With It
- Lorge, Peter A. (2008), The Asian Military Revolution: from Gunpowder to the Bomb, Cambridge University Press, ISBN 978-0-521-60954-8
- Lu, Gwei-Djen (1988), "The Oldest Representation of a Bombard", Technology and Culture, 29 (3): 594–605, doi:10.2307/3105275, JSTOR 3105275, S2CID 112733319
- McNeill, William Hardy (1992), The Rise of the West: A History of the Human Community, University of Chicago Press.
- Morillo, Stephen (2008), War in World History: Society, Technology, and War from Ancient Times to the Present, Volume 1, To 1500, McGraw-Hill, ISBN 978-0-07-052584-9
- Needham, Joseph (1980), Science & Civilisation in China, vol. 5 pt. 4, Cambridge University Press, ISBN 0-521-08573-X
- Needham, Joseph (1986), Science & Civilisation in China, vol. V:7: The Gunpowder Epic, Cambridge University Press, ISBN 0-521-30358-3.
- Nicolle, David (1990), The Mongol Warlords: Genghis Khan, Kublai Khan, Hulegu, Tamerlane
- Nolan, Cathal J. (2006), The Age of Wars of Religion, 1000–1650: an Encyclopedia of Global Warfare and Civilization, vol. 1, A–K, Westport & London: Greenwood Press, ISBN 0-313-33733-0
- Norris, John (2003), Early Gunpowder Artillery: 1300–1600, Marlborough: The Crowood Press.
- Partington, J. R. (1960), A History of Greek Fire and Gunpowder, Cambridge, UK: W. Heffer & Sons.
- Partington, J. R. (1999) [1960], A History of Greek Fire and Gunpowder, Baltimore: Johns Hopkins University Press, ISBN 0-8018-5954-9 – via archive.org
- Patrick, John Merton (1961), Artillery and warfare during the thirteenth and fourteenth centuries, Utah State University Press.
- Pauly, Roger (2004), Firearms: The Life Story of a Technology, Greenwood Publishing Group.
- Perrin, Noel (1979), Giving up the Gun, Japan's reversion to the Sword, 1543–1879, Boston: David R. Godine, ISBN 0-87923-773-2
- Peterson, Harold L. (1965), Arms and Armor in Colonial America: 1526–1783
- Petzal, David E. (2014), The Total Gun Manual (Canadian edition), WeldonOwen.
- Phillips, Henry Prataps (2016), The History and Chronology of Gunpowder and Gunpowder Weapons (c.1000 to 1850), Notion Press
- Purton, Peter (2010), A History of the Late Medieval Siege, 1200–1500, Boydell Press, ISBN 978-1-84383-449-6
- Razso, G. (1982), From Hunyadi to Rakocki: War and Society in Late Medieval and Early Modern Hungary
- Robins, Benjamin (1742), New Principles of Gunnery
- Rogers, Clifford J. (1995), The Military Revolution Debate
- Rose, Susan (2002), Medieval Naval Warfare 1000–1500, Routledge
- Roy, Kaushik (2015), Warfare in Pre-British India, Routledge
- Schmidtchen, Volker (1977a), "Riesengeschütze des 15. Jahrhunderts. Technische Höchstleistungen ihrer Zeit", Technikgeschichte 44 (2): 153–173 (153–157)
- Schmidtchen, Volker (1977b), "Riesengeschütze des 15. Jahrhunderts. Technische Höchstleistungen ihrer Zeit", Technikgeschichte 44 (3): 213–237 (226–228)
- Sherer, Idan (2017), Warriors for a Living: The Experience of the Spanish Infantry During the Italian Wars, 1494–1559, Brill
- Tran, Nhung Tuyet (2006), Viêt Nam Borderless Histories, University of Wisconsin Press.
- Turnbull, Stephen (2003), Fighting Ships Far East (2): Japan and Korea AD 612–1639, New Vanguard 63, Osprey Publishing, ISBN 1-84176-478-7
- Urbanski, Tadeusz (1967), Chemistry and Technology of Explosives, vol. III, New York: Pergamon Press.
- Villalon, L. J. Andrew (2008), The Hundred Years War (part II): Different Vistas, Brill Academic Pub, ISBN 978-90-04-16821-3
- Wagner, John A. (2006), The Encyclopedia of the Hundred Years War, Westport & London: Greenwood Press, ISBN 0-313-32736-X
- Watson, Peter (2006), Ideas: A History of Thought and Invention, from Fire to Freud, Harper Perennial (2006), ISBN 0-06-093564-2
- Williams, Alan (2003), A history of the metallurgy of armour in the middle ages and the early modern period, Brill
- Willbanks, James H. (2004), Machine guns: an illustrated history of their impact, ABC-CLIO, Inc.
- Worman, Charles G. (2005), Gunsmoke and Saddle Leather: Firearms in the nineteenth-century American West, UNM Press
