= Lang xian =

Chinese multi-tipped spear

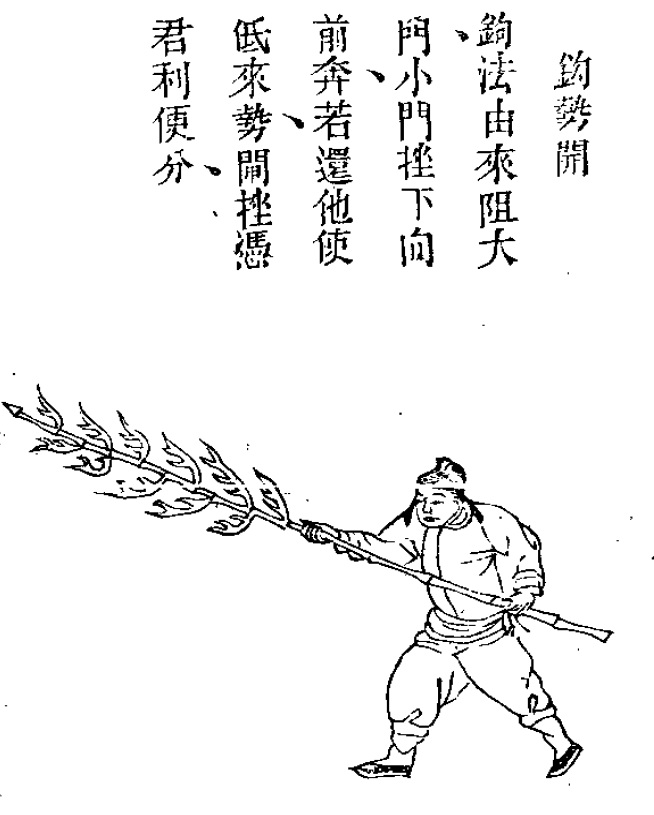
- The langxian depicted in the Wubei Zhi

Chinese name
- Chinese: 狼筅
- Literal meaning: wolf brush
Transcriptions
Standard Mandarin
- Hanyu Pinyin: lángxiǎn

Korean name
- Hangul: 낭선
Transcriptions
- Revised Romanization: Nangseon
- McCune–Reischauer: Nangsŏn

A lang xian, which can be translated as "wolf brush" or "wolf bamboo" or "multiple tipped bamboo spear" was a branched, multi-tipped spear with spikes on the branches made of bamboo or iron. The blades could be dipped in poison. The lang xian was a weapon well suited for defense, as it would be difficult for an opponent to assault the wielder without risking contact with the blades. It was used by Ming Dynasty sailors as protection against Japanese pirates.

It was probably an invention of the Chinese general Qi Jiguang of the Ming Dynasty, who described it in his manual titled Jixiao Xinshu. The manual describes that the lang xian acted as backup for the rattan shield bearers in a "mandarin duck formation". In Korea, the weapon, known as nangseon, was mentioned as early as the 16th century martial arts manual Muyejebo, which was based on the Jixiao Xinshu.

A notable variant design is Xian Qiang (筅槍, lit. 'Brush spear'), which reduces the number of branches to four or five layers, sacrificing some defensive potential for increased maneuverability and lethality.

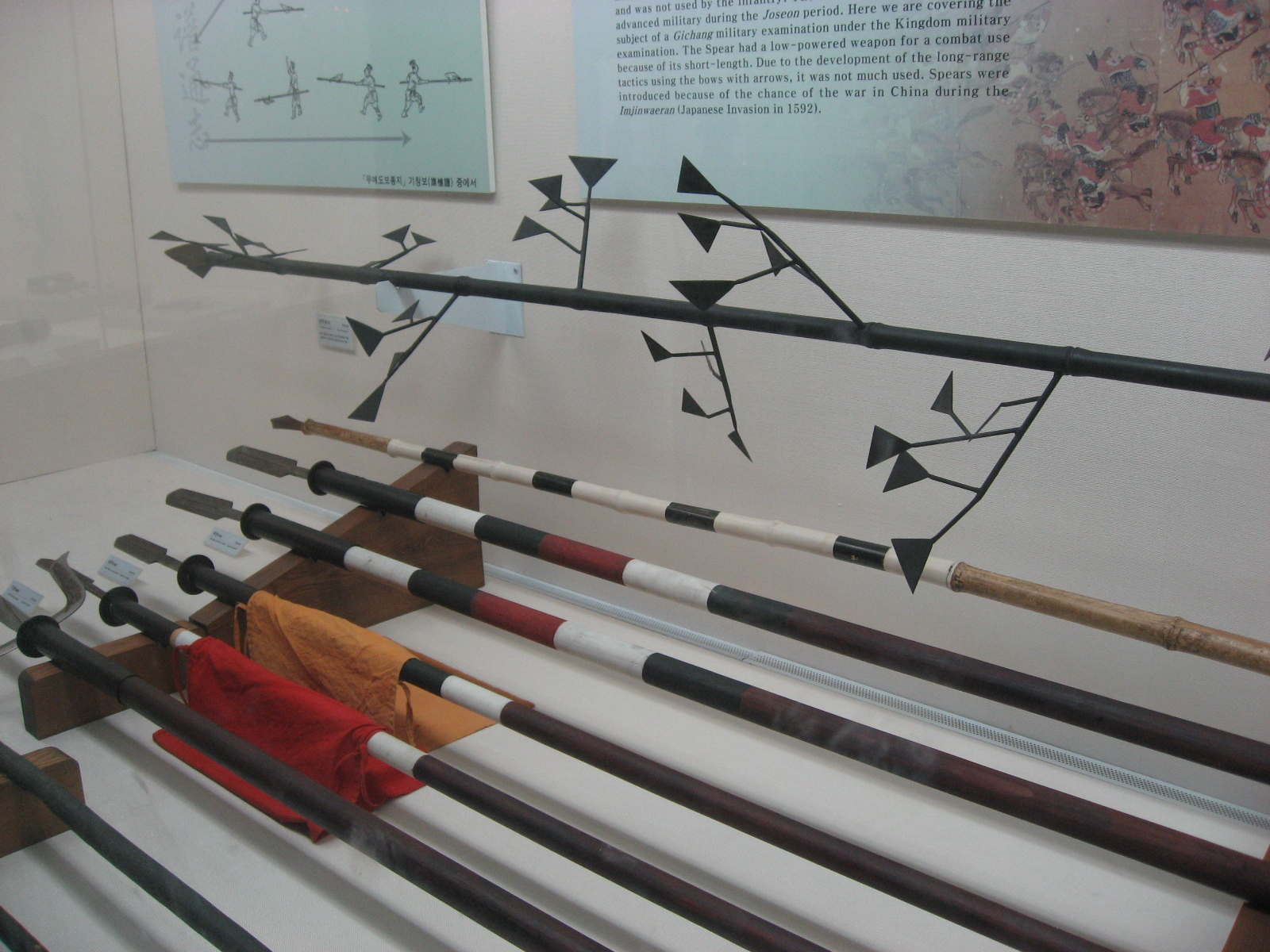
Langxian (top), on display

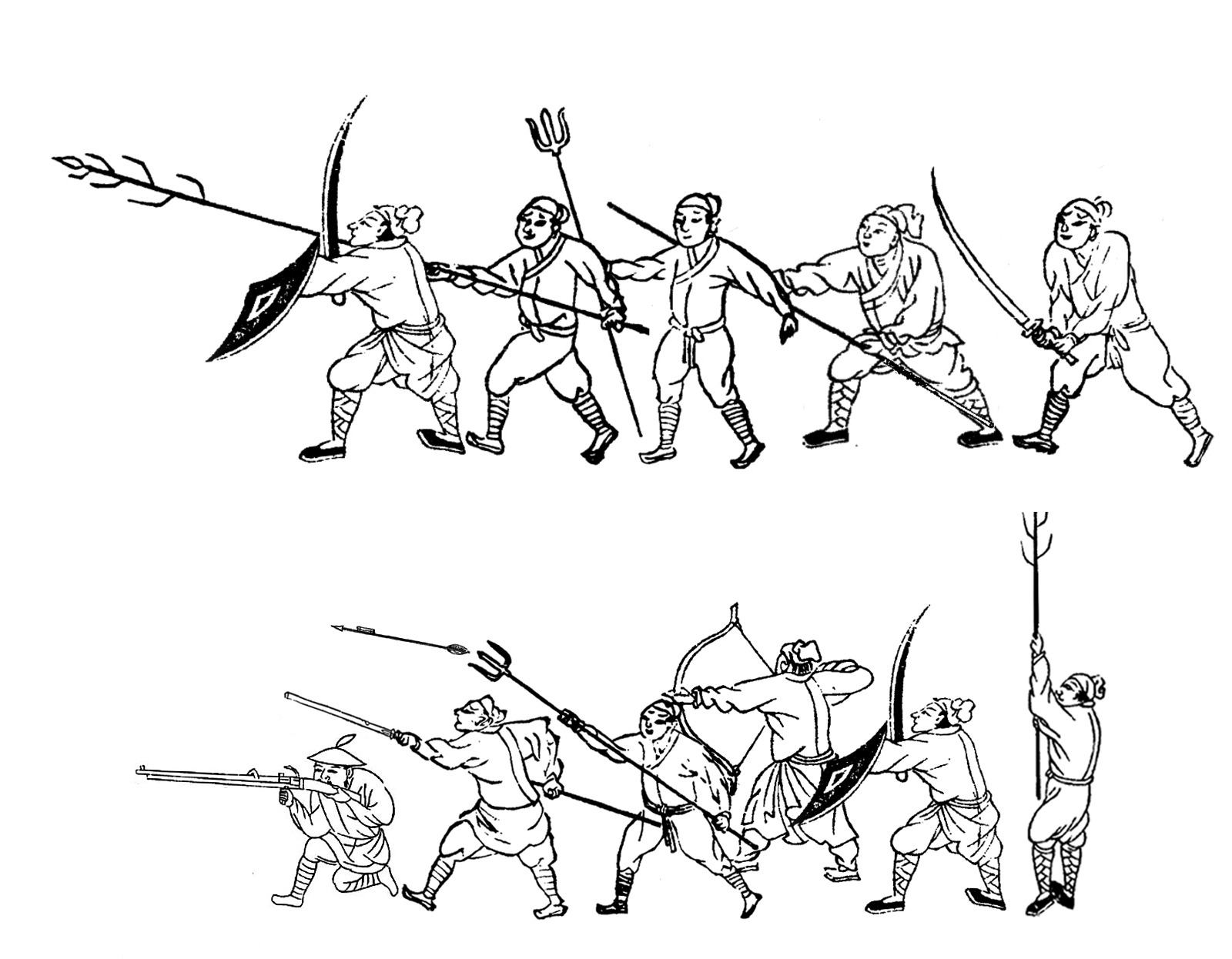
Langxian being used in the mandarin duck formation
