= Cheng Zongyou =

Chinese martial artist (1561–1636)

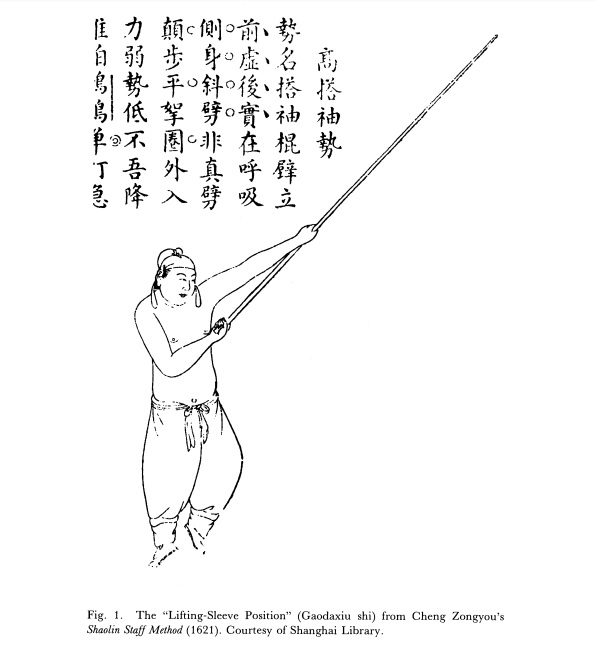
The "Lifting sleeve position" (Gaodaxiu shi) from Cheng Zhongyou's Shaolin Gunfa Changzong (1621)

Cheng Zongyou 程宗猷 (1561–1636) was a Chinese martial artist. He is noted for his publication Shaolin Gunfa Changzong or Elucidation of Shaolin Staff Techniques, as well as the Gengyu Shengji (Skills Beyond Farming) which described various other weapons systems, including Japanese kenjutsu.

Little is known of Cheng's life. He was born in Xiuning County into an upper-class family, and as such had a literary upbringing instead of the military (or criminal) childhood that was more common among professional martial artists of his era. He spent around a decade studying at the Shaolin Monastery, and described his training in some of his works. He also learned Japanese kenjutsu techniques from Liu Yunfeng, who had studied under various Japanese masters of the sword.

His Shaolin Gunfa Changzong was the first documented explanation of Shaolin methods, which had previously been transmitted only orally. Mao Yuanyi, the editor of the Wubei Zhi, was sufficiently impressed with this work that he incorporated it virtually wholesale into his own treatise.
